= Ilmenau =

- Town
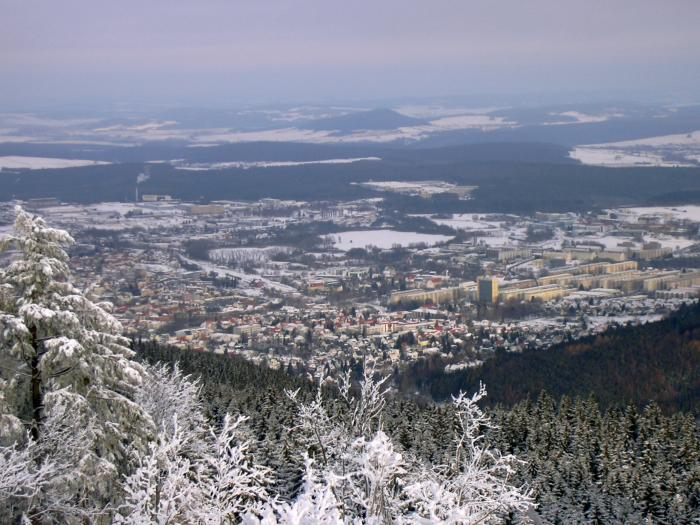
- Ilmenau in winter

- Coat of arms

- Location of Ilmenau within Ilm-Kreis district
- Interactive map of Ilmenau
- Location within Germany Location within Thuringia
- Coordinates: 50°41′02″N 10°55′10″E
- Country: Germany
- State: Thuringia
- District: Ilm-Kreis
- Subdivisions: core town and 16 quarters

Government
  - Mayor (2024–30): Daniel Schultheiß (Ind.)

Area
  - Total: 198.69 km^{2} (76.71 sq mi)
- Elevation: 500 m (1,600 ft)

Population (2025-12-31)
  - Total: 38,834
  - Density: 195.45/km^{2} (506.21/sq mi)
- Time zone: UTC+01:00 (CET)
  - Summer (DST): UTC+02:00 (CEST)
- Postal codes: 98693, 98694
- Dialling codes: 03677
- Vehicle registration: IK, ARN, IL
- Website: www.ilmenau.de

Ilmenau (German pronunciation: [ˈɪlmənaʊ]) is a town in Thuringia, central Germany. It is the largest town within the Ilm district with a population of 38,600, while the district capital is Arnstadt. Ilmenau is located approximately 33 km (21 miles) south of Erfurt and 135 km (84 miles) north of Nuremberg within the Ilm valley at the northern edge of the Thuringian Forest at an elevation of 500 metres (1,640 feet).

The most important institution in Ilmenau is the Technische Universität Ilmenau, a public research university and Thuringia's only "Technical University" with about 4,900 students and an emphasis on engineering disciplines, computer science, mathematics, natural sciences, economics, and media studies. Its precursor was founded in 1894 and developed into a university in 1992. Since 1990, many research institutes have been established in the vicinity making Ilmenau an important hub of technological research.

Ilmenau was historically a small mining town, primarily silver, copper and manganese, until the deposits were depleted. After 1800, it was one of Johann Wolfgang von Goethe's favourite resorts because of its beautiful surroundings. In 1838, the establishment of the town as a spa led to the advent of tourism, which is still an important industry. Industrialisation started after the railway arrived in 1879, but increased rapidly during the following century primarily in glass and porcelain manufacturing. The porcelain factories closed (as in many other places in western Europe) during the 1990s. The glass industry, however, remained and produces laboratory equipment and measurement devices and is leading source of economic activity together with mechanical, electrical, and software engineering. Ilmenau and the surrounding region have produced many winter Olympic champions in disciplines such as luge, bobsleigh, and biathlon.

== History ==
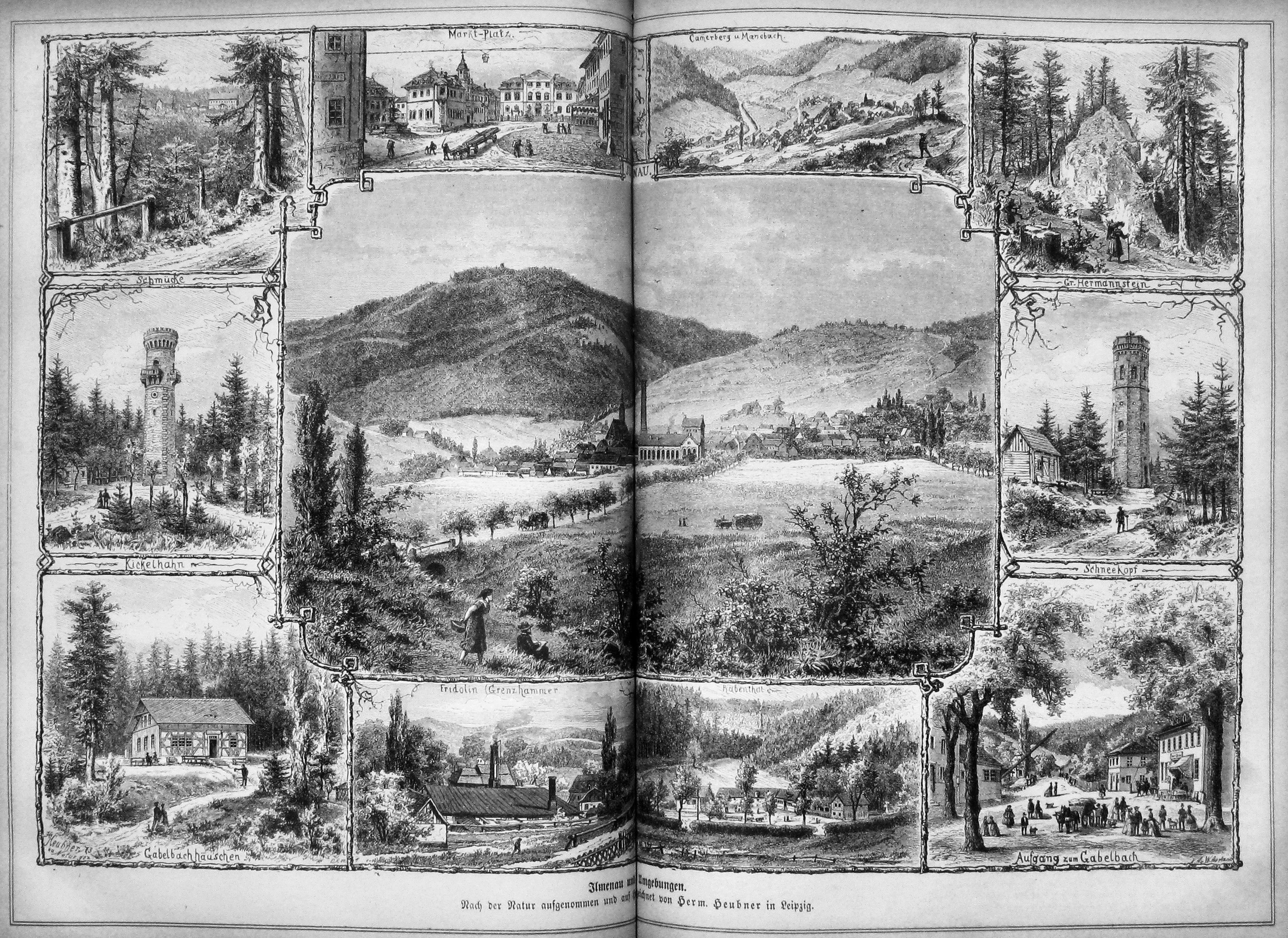
Sights around Ilmenau in 1873

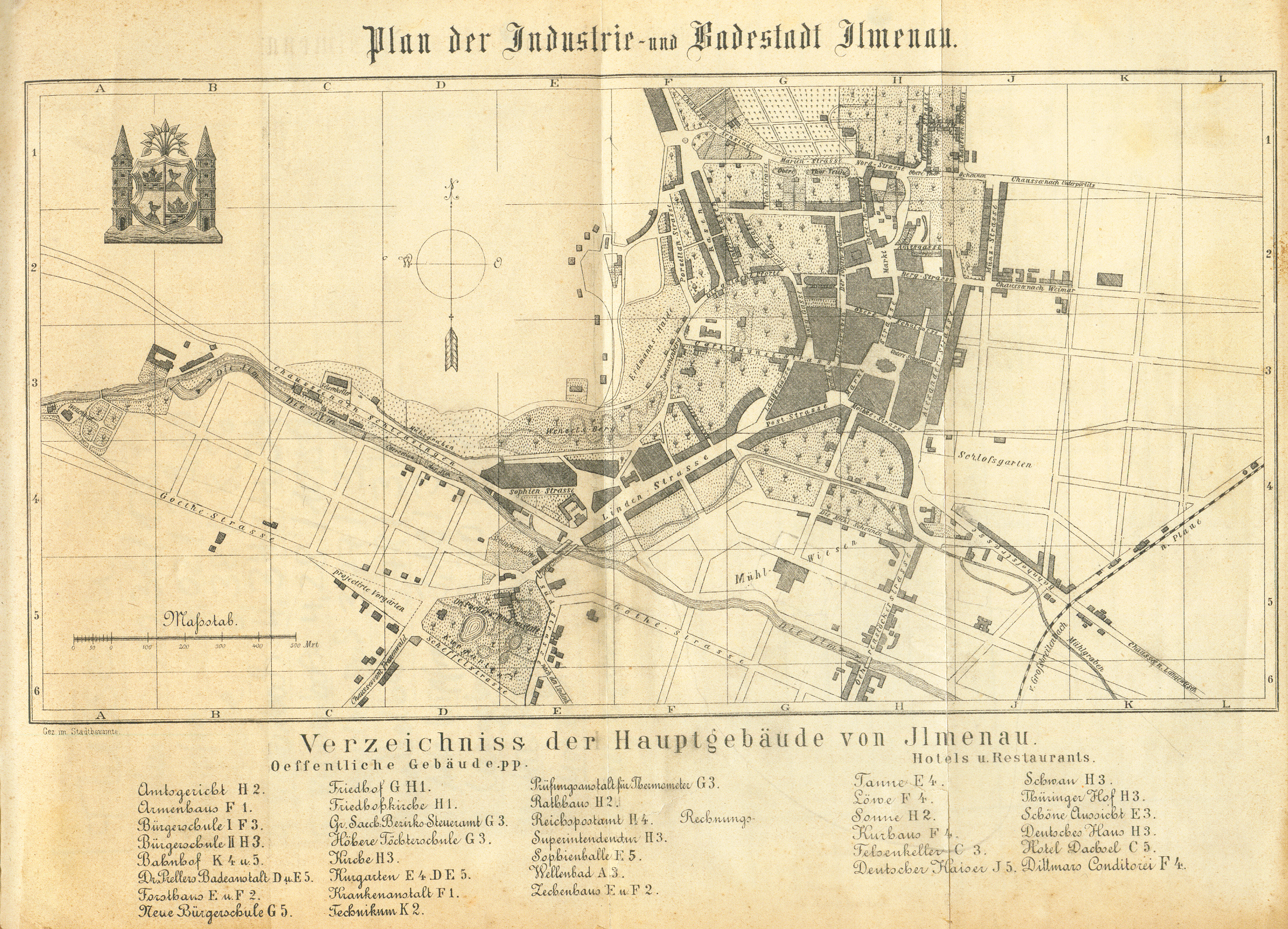
City map (1890)

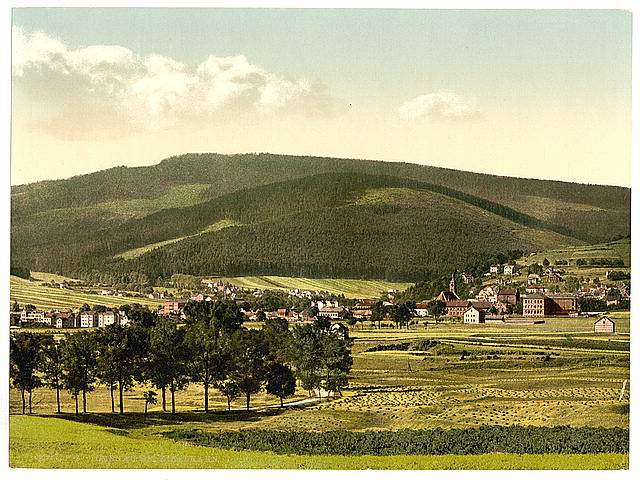
View around 1900

=== Middle Ages ===
The name comes from the German words Ulmen (i.e. Elms) and Aue (i.e. floodplain), in reference to the floodplain of the Ilm river, which was covered with elms before the foundation of the town. The mascots ("town animals") of Ilmenau are the hen and the goat.

The origins of Ilmenau are unknown. It is possible that the village was founded by the St. Peter's monastery of Saalfeld, which encouraged the settlement of this part of Thuringia during the High Middle Ages. However, there are no written sources to verify or disprove this. A first church was built during the 12th century; its walls were found under today's St. James Church. The first written mention of Ilmenau followed later, in 1273, as the village had already existed many decades. At that time, Ilmenau belonged to the Counts of Käfernburg. They died out in 1302 and Ilmenau became part of the Schwarzburg County. After 1320, an important trade route from Nuremberg in the south to Erfurt in the north was relocated next to Ilmenau, so that a castle was established to control the traffic. Soon after, the Schwarzburgs founded a planned town (relatively similar to Königsee) and Ilmenau received municipal rights in 1341. By 1343 the Schwarzburgs had sold their new town to the Counts of Henneberg, who held it until their line died out in 1583. Nevertheless, the Hennebergs often mortgaged Ilmenau to other houses like the Schwarzburgs (1351–1420 and 1445–1464), the Witzlebens (1420–1434) and the Schaumbergs (1476–1498).

=== Early modern period ===
Between 1471 and 1626, copper mining made an important contribution to the economy of Ilmenau. In 1611, the mines produced an estimated 38 tons of copper and 188 kg of silver. Production reached these levels again in the 1730s until the operations ceased in 1739 because of an ingress of water in the mines. A brief revival of copper mining under the leadership of Johann Wolfgang von Goethe failed during the first decades of the 19th century. The Ilmenau mint was in use between 1690 and 1705 producing silver Talers and smaller copper coins. A subsequent blow to the economy after the end of mining in 1739 occurred in 1752, as the town was nearly completely destroyed by fire. The population was impoverished and living conditions were bad. Reconstruction took decades under the leadership of Gottfried Heinrich Krohne, a famous late-Baroque architect in Germany, who planned the new church, town hall and street plan, and so on.

After the Hennebergs died out in 1583, the city belonged to the Wettins and since 1661 to the Wettin-Ernestine duchy of Saxe-Weimar (until the end of monarchy in Germany in 1918). The dukes tried to foster the town's economy by founding porcelain and glass manufactures. Whereas the foundation of the porcelain manufacture in 1777 was successful, the glass industry failed twice until industrialisation started in the 1850s.

Johann Wolfgang von Goethe visited Ilmenau often between 1776 and 1831, sometimes as minister of Saxe-Weimar-Eisenach and sometimes for private holidays. Some Ilmenau-related parts of his written works are the poem "Ilmenau" (1783, the only town that Goethe dedicated a poem to), the poem "Wanderer's Nightsong II" (1780, which was written at Kickelhahn mountain) and the 4th act of "Iphigenia" (1779, written at Schwalbenstein rock).

=== Since 1815 ===
Since 1838, Ilmenau had been a spa ressort, based on water cure treatments at hydropathic establishments. Ilmenau's hydropathic establishment was serviced by Drs Schwabe, Fitzler, Baumbach, and Preller.

The later 19th century brought a boost to the town's development: the former 2000 people-small town arose to an industrial centre of glass, porcelain and toy production. Furthermore, mining saw a resurgence by gaining fluorite and Braunstein (manganese ore). After being connected by railway in 1879, the Industrial Revolution reached the town. Some factories for porcelain (Graf von Henneberg Porzellan since 1777), glasswares (the Sophienhütte since 1852) and toys developed and grew until the Great Depression. It weakened especially private consumption, so that Ilmenau's toy industry collapsed, same as some porcelain producers focused on bibelot.

The precursor to the current university was founded in 1894 as the Thüringisches Technikum. Now, it is the Technische Universität Ilmenau, where the ISWI takes place every two years.

After the German Revolution of 1918–19, the Thuringian small states, including Saxe-Weimar-Eisenach, were merged into the new federal state of Thuringia in 1920 of which Ilmenau became part. It belonged to the Arnstadt district, which was divided in 1952 into the new Ilmenau district (southern part, to Bezirk Suhl) and the Arnstadt district (northern part, to Bezirk Erfurt). In 1994, both districts were reunited with the new name "Ilm-Kreis" (by the river Ilm) and Arnstadt as capital.

The FIL European Luge Championships of 1934 took place in the town. In the last few years of World War II, Ilmenau was the site of manufacture of the mock-up production of the single-seat fighter version of the Horten Ho 229 V6 (Version 6) jet aircraft. The only surviving example of the Horten jet is the Horten Ho 229 V3. In December 2011, the Horten V3 was transferred to the Smithsonian Institution's Paul E. Garber Restoration Facility in Suitland, Maryland, US.

== Geography and demographics ==
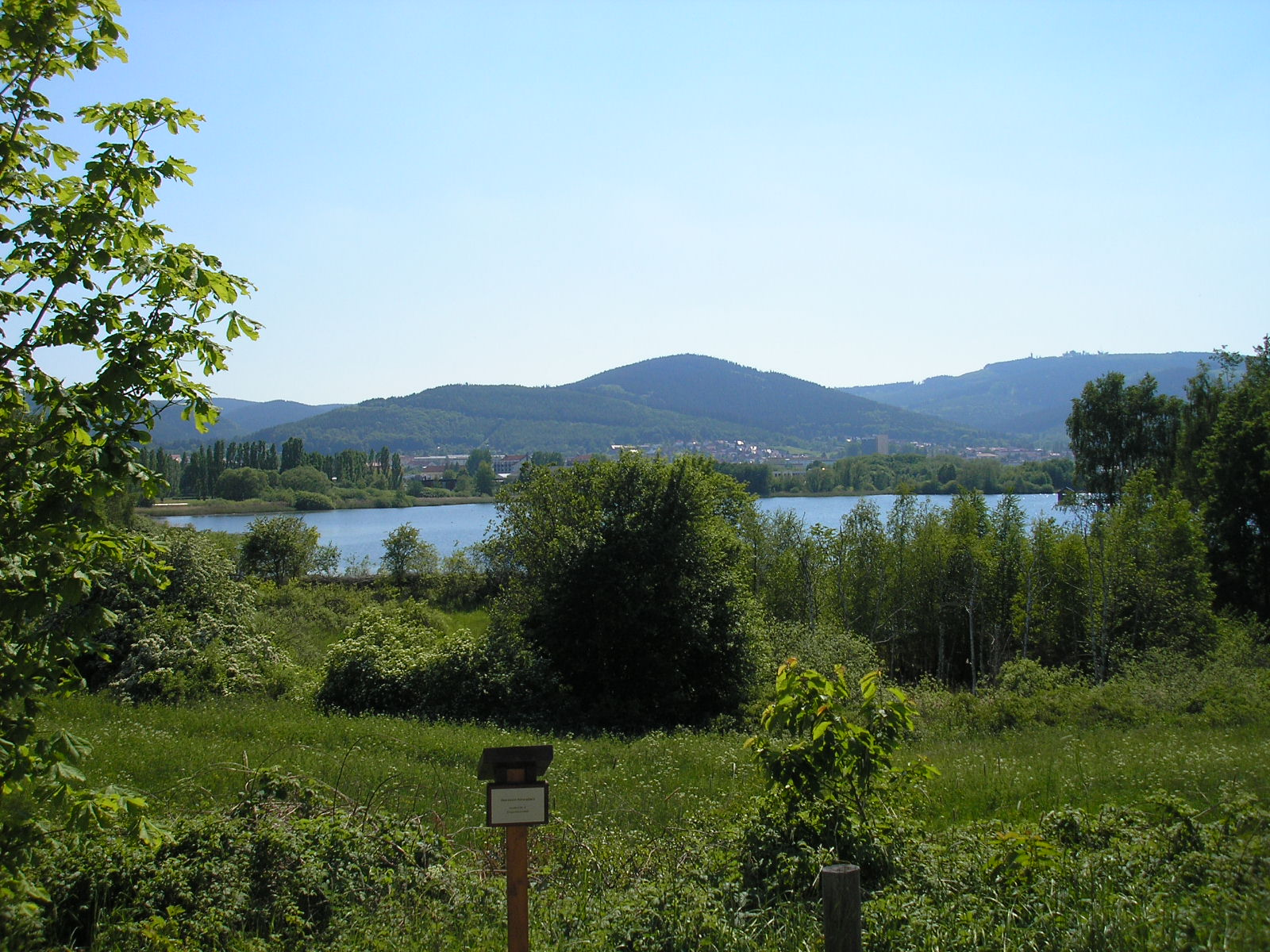
View from the Teichgebiet over the town to the Thuringian Forest with Kickelhahn mountain on the right

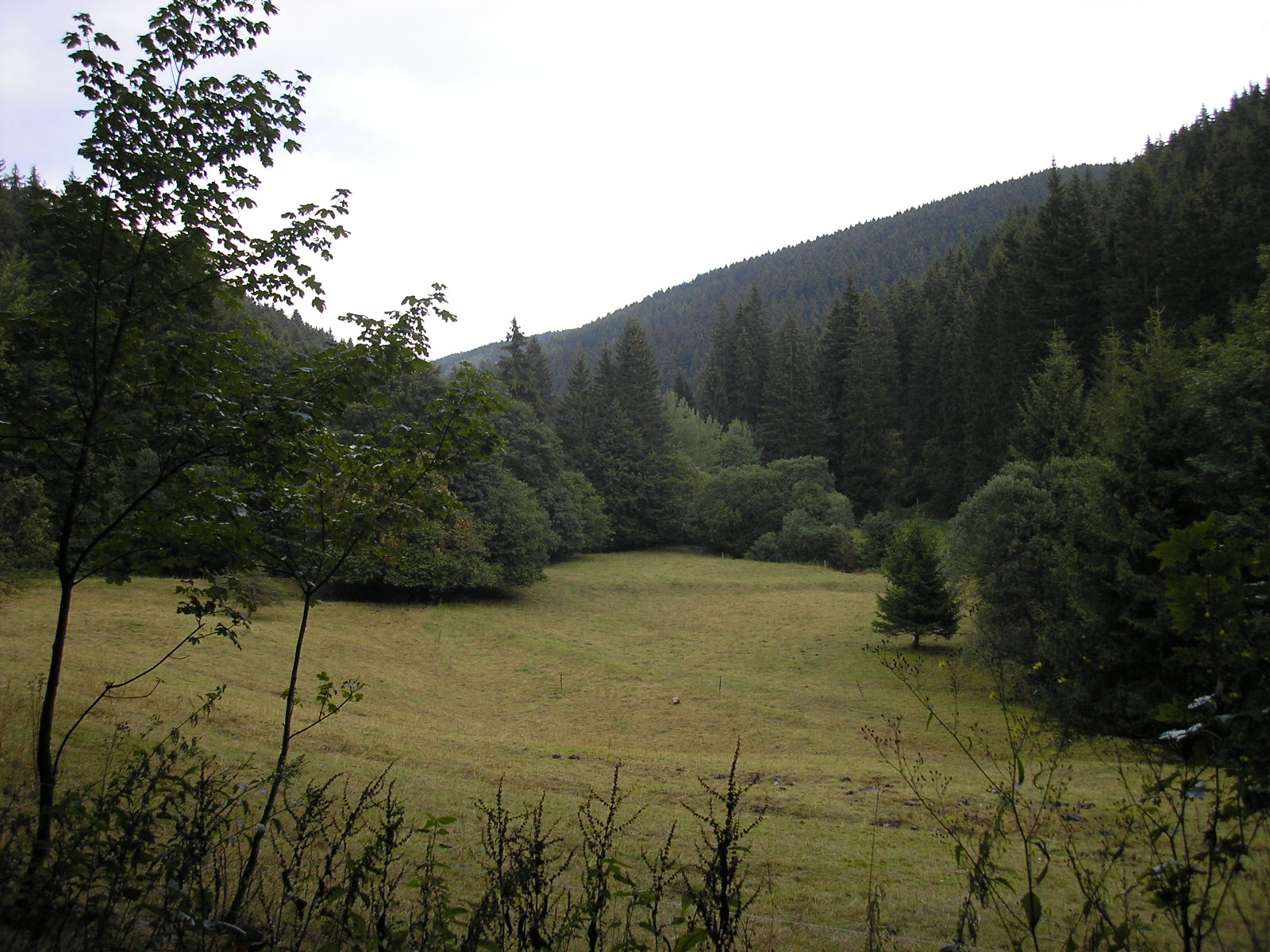
Schorte valley south of the town

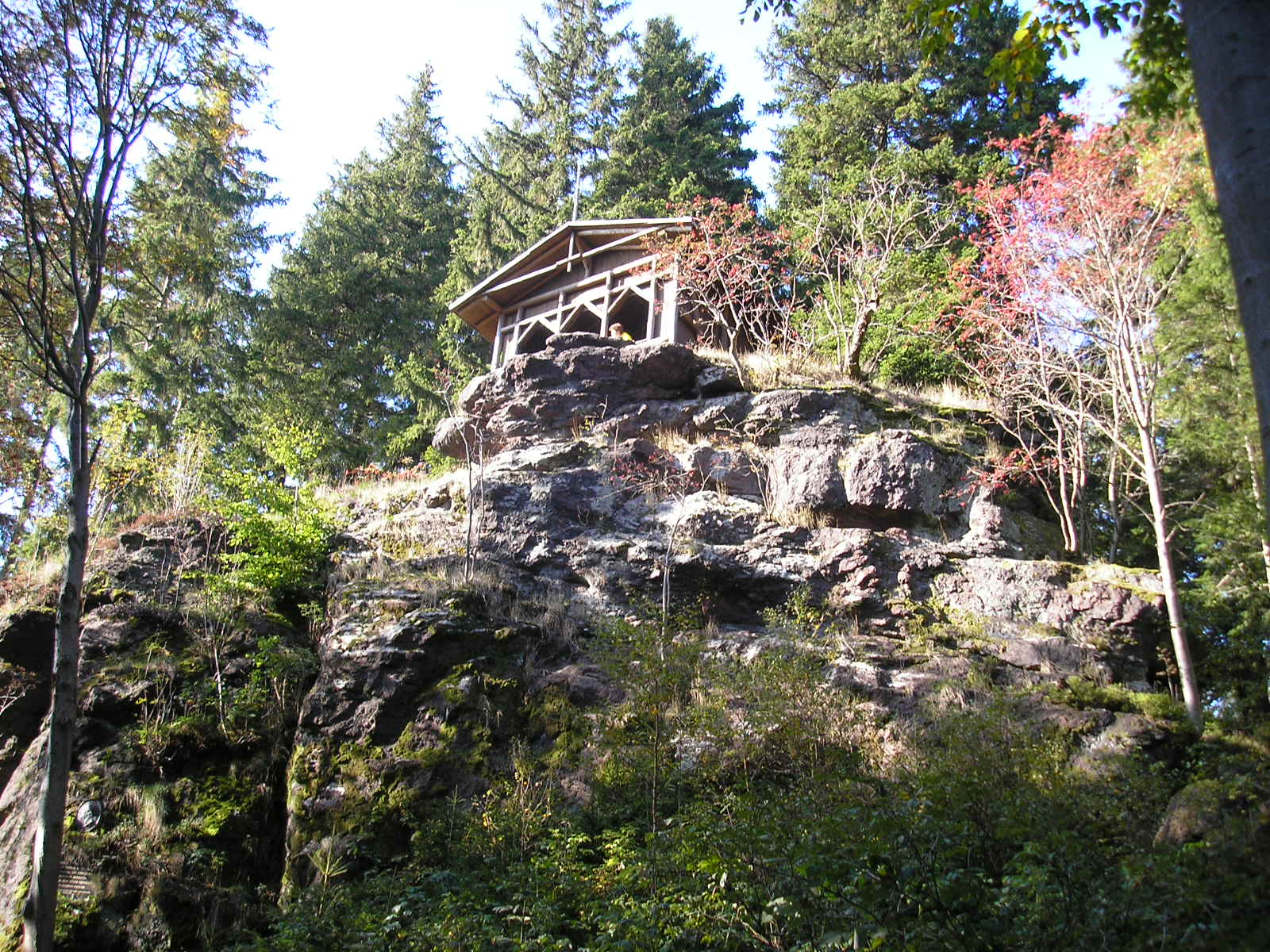
Schwalbenstein rock in the western forest

=== Topography ===
Ilmenau is located within a basin, formed by Ilm river on the northern edge of the Thuringian Forest at an altitude of 500m. The surrounding mountains are the Pörlitzer Höhe (573 m) in the north, the Ehrenberg (528 m) and the Tragberg (534 m) in the east, the Lindenberg (749 m) in the south, the Kickelhahn (861 m) in the south-west and the Hangeberg (701 m) in the west. Whereas the first three belong to the foothills, the last are part of the mountainous Thuringian Forest. There is also a geological border between them: the mountain range is of porphyry and the foothills are of Muschelkalk (in the west) and Buntsandstein (in the east). The Kickelhahn is one of the most visited mountains within the Thuringian Forest and hosts an old viewing tower with a panorama above the town and the forest landscape.

The Ilm river has two significant tributaries in the vicinity of Ilmenau: the Gabelbach is a small creek with a small valley between Kickelhahn and Lindenberg south of the city. It is one of the most preferred areas for walks next to Ilmenau. The other is the Schorte, a bigger creek within a deep, 10 km (6 mi) long valley in the south-east, marked by many abandoned mining tunnels, including one that can be visited as a mining museum. The area north of Pörlitzer Höhe is not part of the Ilm's drainage basin, the emanating rivers here (Reichenbach near Roda district and Wipfra near Oberpörlitz district) are tributaries of the Gera, which is itself a tributary of River Unstrut.

There is a water area in the centre of the town, the Ilmenauer Teichgebiet. This lies between the old town and the main campus of the university with 5 lakes, laid out by monks during the Middle Ages for providing fish. The biggest lake with an area of 95 hectares is made up of the Wipfra river next to Heyda district by the Heyda Dam, built in the 1980s. Nearly all the unbuilt municipal area is covered by forest with spruces and pines (in the north) as the main species. Smaller areas are also covered by beeches. The forest monocultures of spruces were caused by the enormous need of wood for mining and glass industry during the previous centuries. However, they are susceptible to diseases and windthrow and will be replaced by more natural mixed forest during the next few decades after storm conditions Kyrill led to enormous damage within the town's forests in 2007.

=== Administrative division ===
Ilmenau abuts the following municipalities, which are all part of the Ilm district: Neusiß, Plaue and Wipfratal in the north, Wolfsberg and Langewiesen in the east, Stützerbach, Schmiedefeld am Rennsteig and Gehlberg in the south as well as Elgersburg and Martinroda in the west.

There are five villages which are incorporated as municipal districts of Ilmenau: Heyda (incorporated in 1994), Manebach (1994), Oberpörlitz (1993), Roda (1939) and Unterpörlitz (1981). In July 2018 the former municipalities of Gehren, Langewiesen, Pennewitz and Wolfsberg were merged with Ilmenau. In January 2019 the former municipalities of Frauenwald and Stützerbach were also merged with Ilmenau.

=== Demographics ===
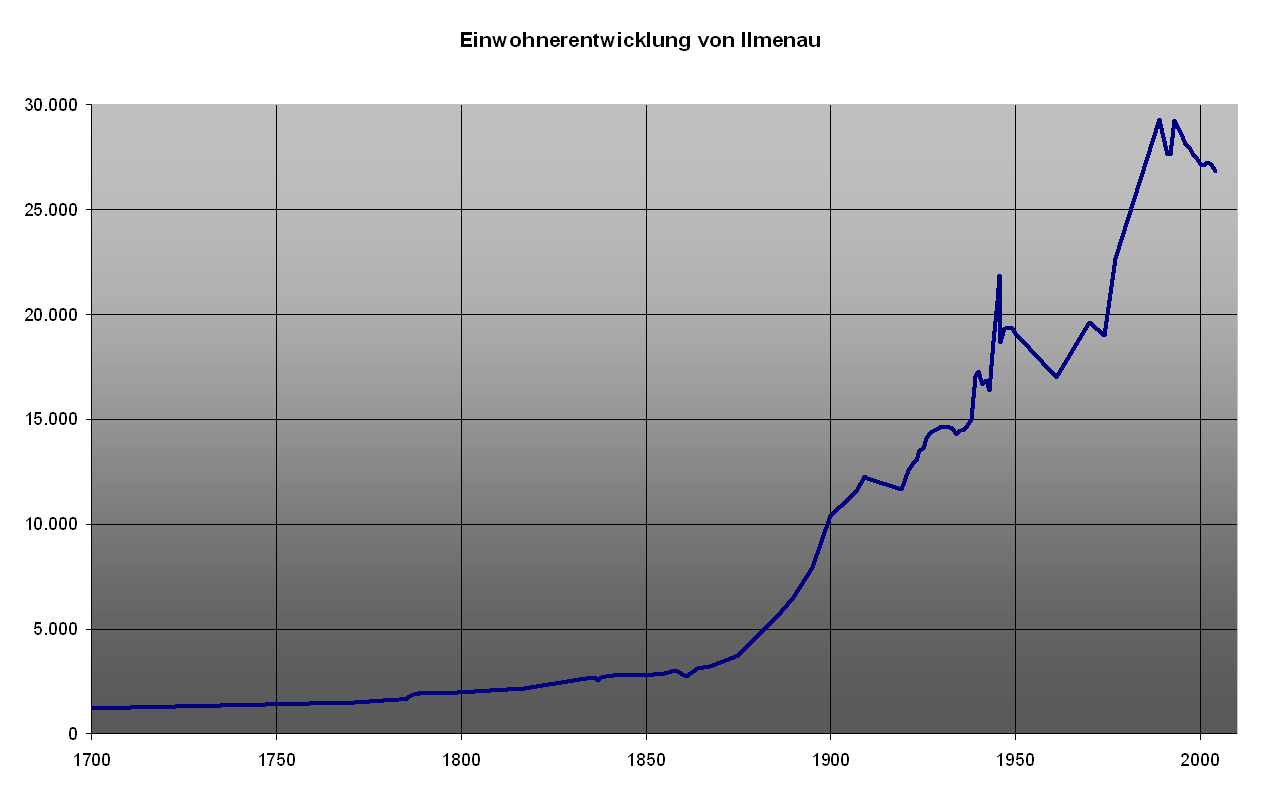
Growth of population until 2005

Ten largest groups of foreign residents
| Country of origin | Population (2012-12-31) |
|---|---|
| China | 191 |
| Russia | 127 |
| Syria | 98 |
| Ukraine | 83 |
| Vietnam | 71 |
| India | 57 |
| Pakistan | 56 |
| Bulgaria | 45 |
| Poland | 39 |
| Romania | 38 |

In the past, Ilmenau had been a small town of less than 2,000 inhabitants. Population growth began in the 19th century from 2,000 in 1800, 2,800 in 1850 and reaching 3,400 in 1870. Subsequently, the population grew rapidly to 10,400 in 1900 and 17,300 in 1940. After World War II, the population rose further to 20,000 in 1975 and to the peak in 1988 with a population of 29,500. The unfavourable economic situation in the old East Germany after reunification in 1990 resulted in a decline in the population, which fell to 27,000 in 2000 before stabilising.

The average decline of population between 2009 and 2012 was approximately −0.03% p. a, whereas the population in bordering rural areas is declining more and more rapidly. Suburbanization has played only a small role in Ilmenau. It occurred after reunification for a short time in the 1990s, but most of the suburban areas were situated within the administrative city borders (e.g. Oberpörlitz and Hüttenholz settlement), others were Langewiesen or Elgersburg.

The birth deficit was 132 in 2012, this is −5.1 per 1,000 inhabitants (Thuringian average: -4.5; national average: -2.4). The net migration rate was +2.8 per 1,000 inhabitants in 2012 (Thuringian average: -0.8; national average: +4.6). The most important regions of origin of Ilmenau migrants are rural areas of Thuringia as well as foreign countries.

Like other eastern German cities, Ilmenau has only a small immigrant population: circa 4.4% are non-Germans by citizenship and overall 9.5% are migrants (according to 2011 EU census). Differing from the national average, the biggest groups of migrants in Ilmenau are Chinese, Russians and Syrians. During recent years, the economic situation of the city has improved: the unemployment rate within the Ilm district has declined from 21% in 2005 to 7% in 2013. Owing to the official atheism in former GDR, most of the population is non-religious. 17.4% are members of the Evangelical Church in Central Germany (Lutheran) and 5.0% are Roman Catholics, according to 2011 EU census.

== Culture, sights and cityscape ==
=== Museums ===
There are several museums in Ilmenau:

- The Goethe-Stadt-Museum in the Amtshaus in the market place is both the municipal museum and a museum about Johann Wolfgang von Goethe and his connection to the city.
- The Jagdhaus Gabelbach in the forest south of the city is a former hunting lodge built in 1783 and contains an exhibition about hunting and forestry during the 18th century.
- The Fischerhütte in Langewiesener Strasse is a former glass factory and displays historic laboratory glassware produced in Ilmenau as well as temporary exhibitions, for example about optics and light.
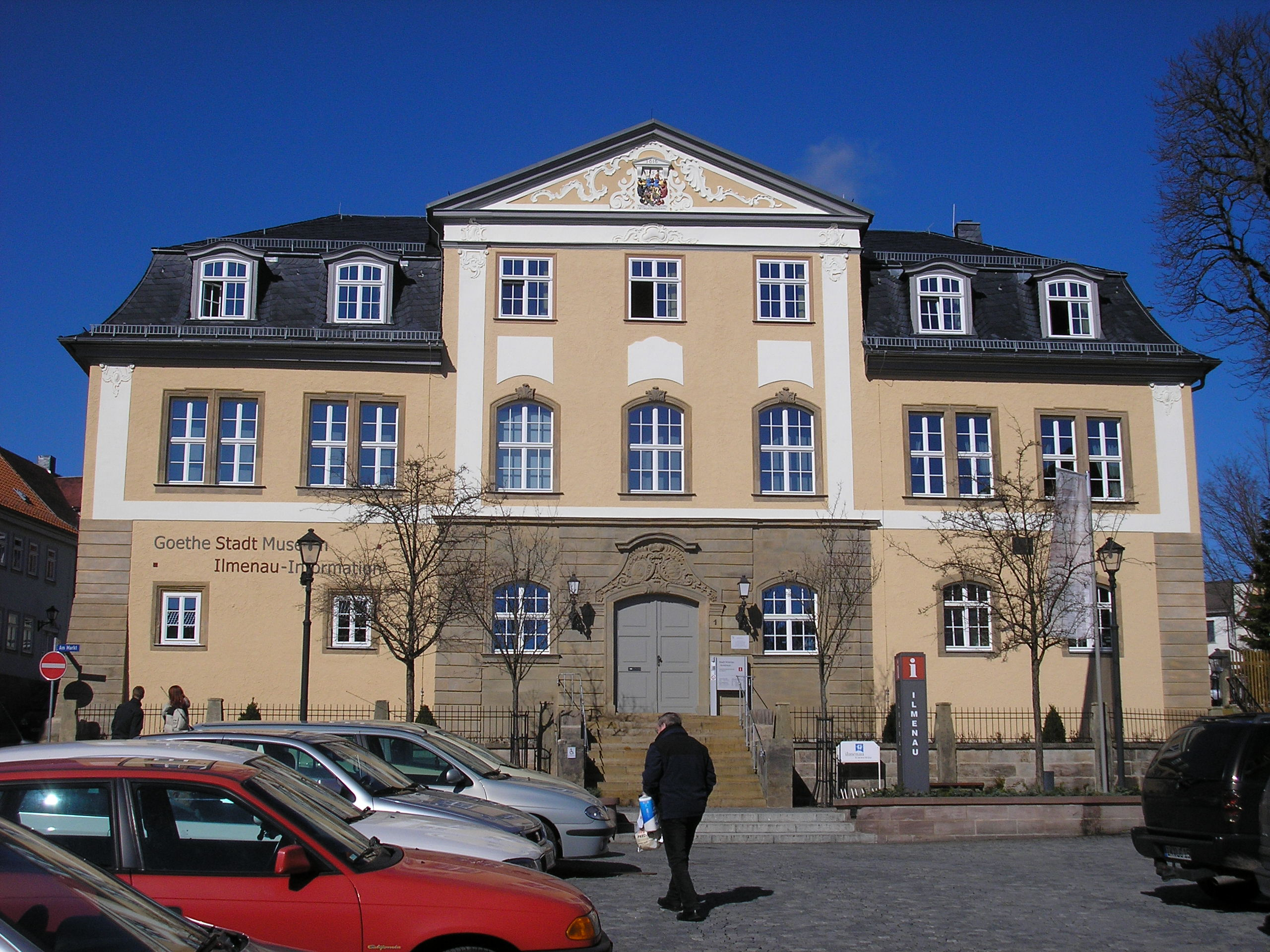
Goethe-Stadt-Museum

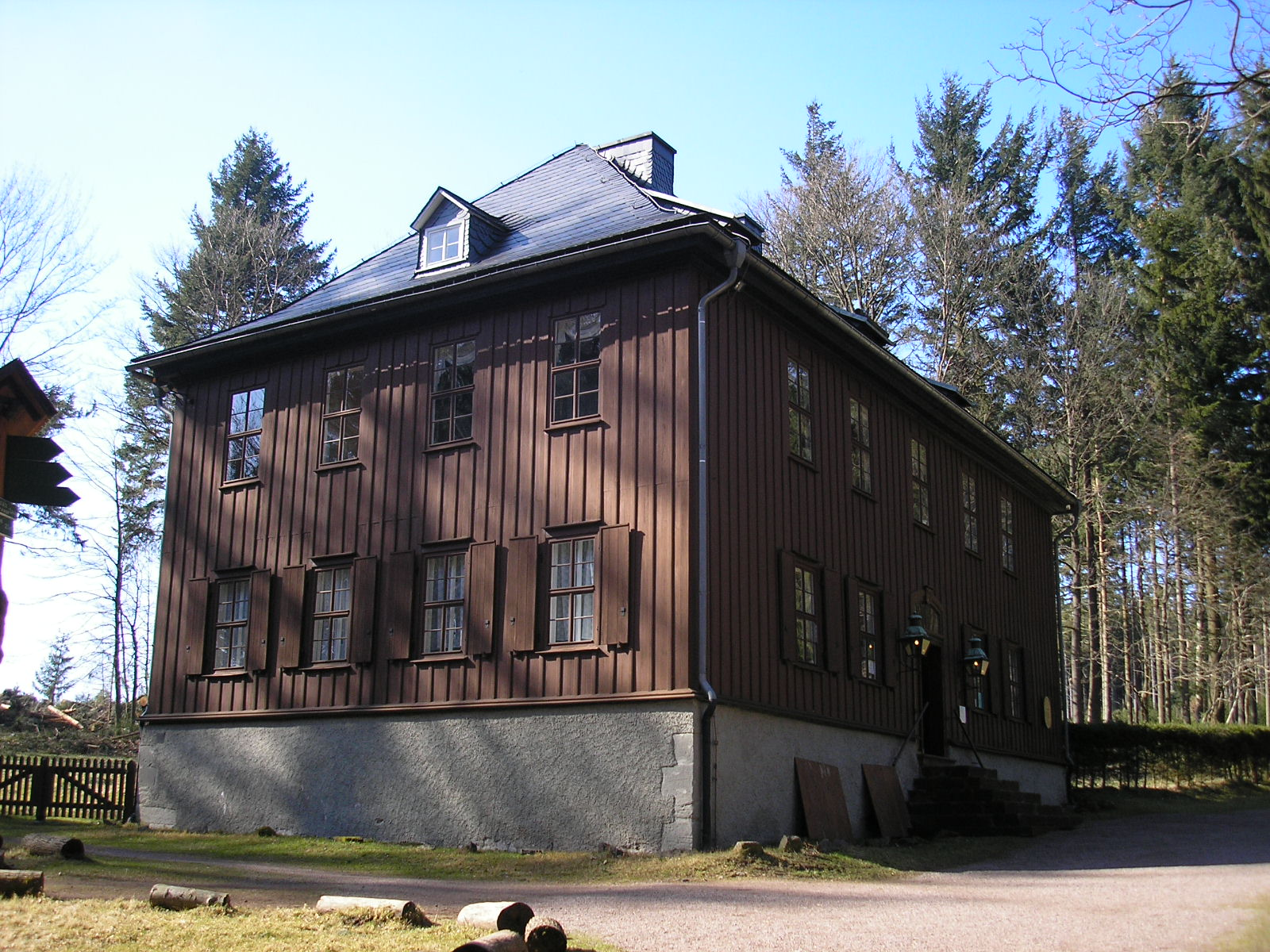
Jagdhaus Gabelbach

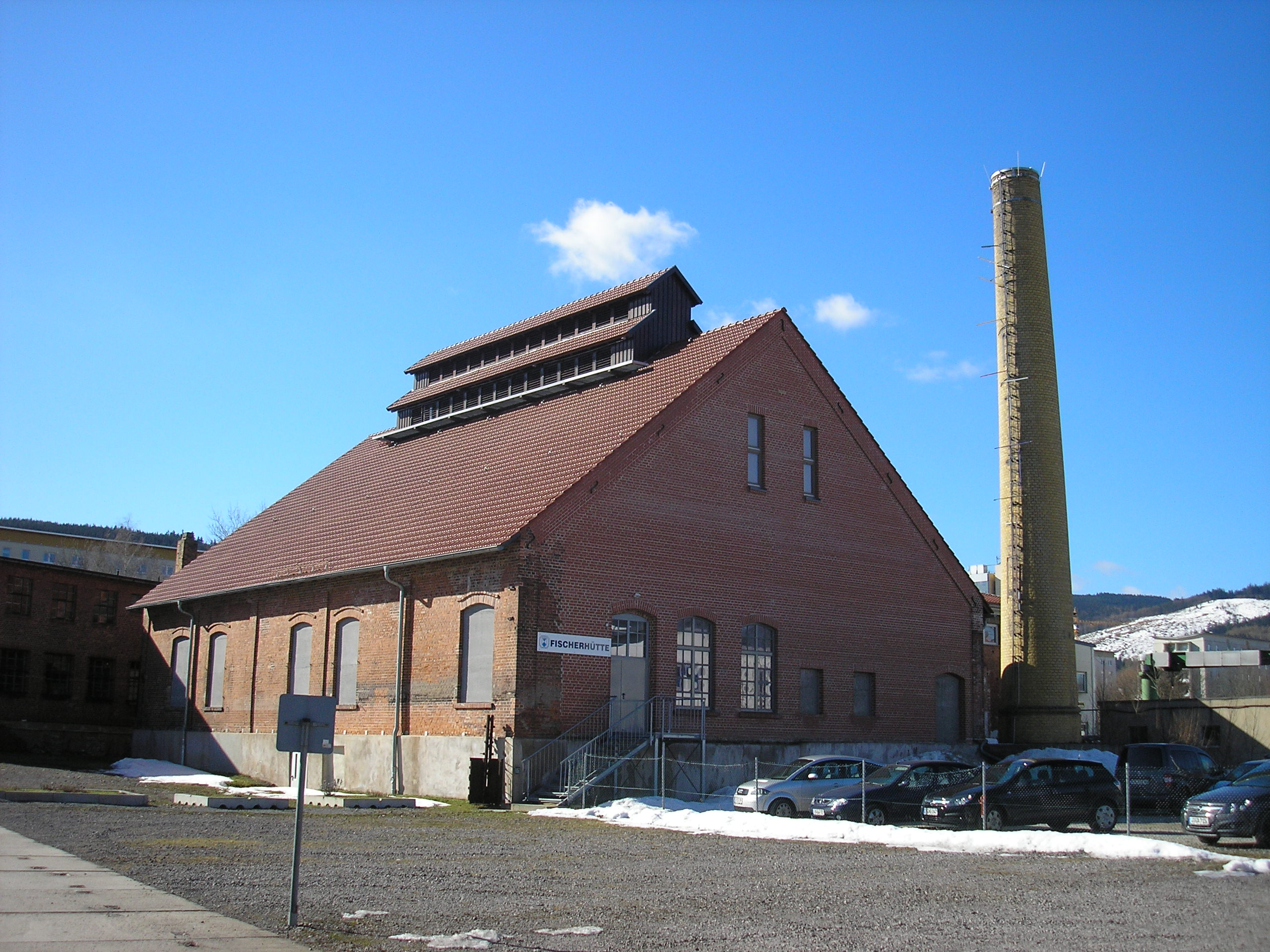
Fischerhütte

=== Cityscape ===
The town fire in 1752 destroyed nearly all the buildings in Ilmenau, so that the town was rebuilt during the 1750s and 1760s in a relatively uniform late-Baroque style by Gottfried Heinrich Krohne. The town centre is located between Obertorstraße in the north, Poststrasse in the east, Mühlgraben in the south and Burggasse in the west. Two older suburbs are the quarters around Rasen in the north-west and Lindenstraße in the south-west. Between 1871 and 1914, some interesting parts of the town with large villas developed: a larger one in the south-west around Waldstraße and Goetheallee and a smaller one in the west around Sturmheide, which are hosting noble mansions in Gründerzeit and Art Nouveau style. On the one hand, prosperous factory owners lived here and on the other hand, many buildings were in use as guesthouses as Ilmenau was a spa town during the 19th century. During the GDR period, two big Plattenbau estates were established in the south-east ("Stollen") and in the north ("Pörlitzer Höhe"). The university's main campus at Ehrenberg in the east was set up in the 1950s and enlarged during the following decades up to the present time. It hosts also some interesting architecture from Stalinist neo-classicism to contemporary glass-and-steel architecture.

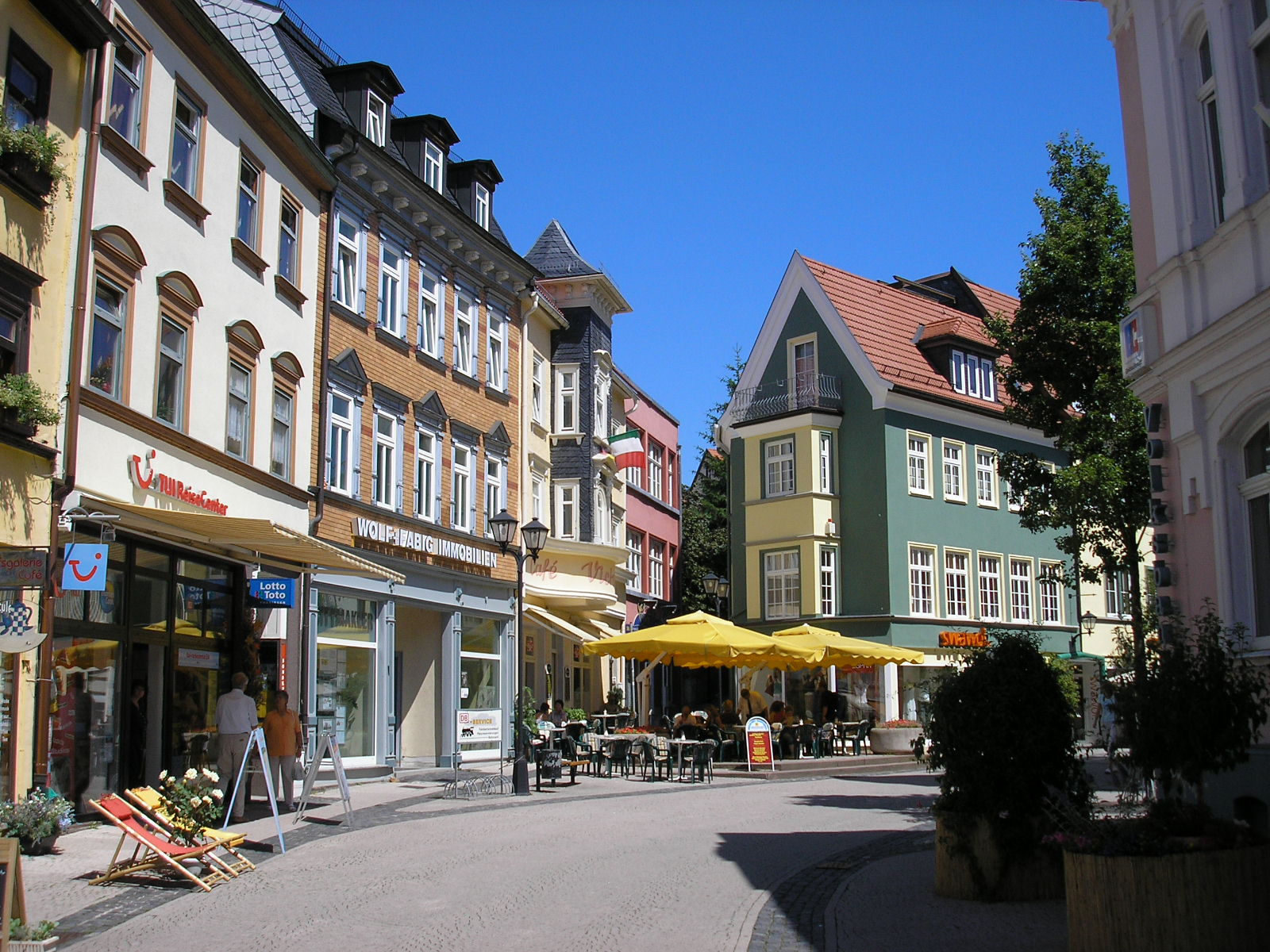
Pedestrian area in the centre

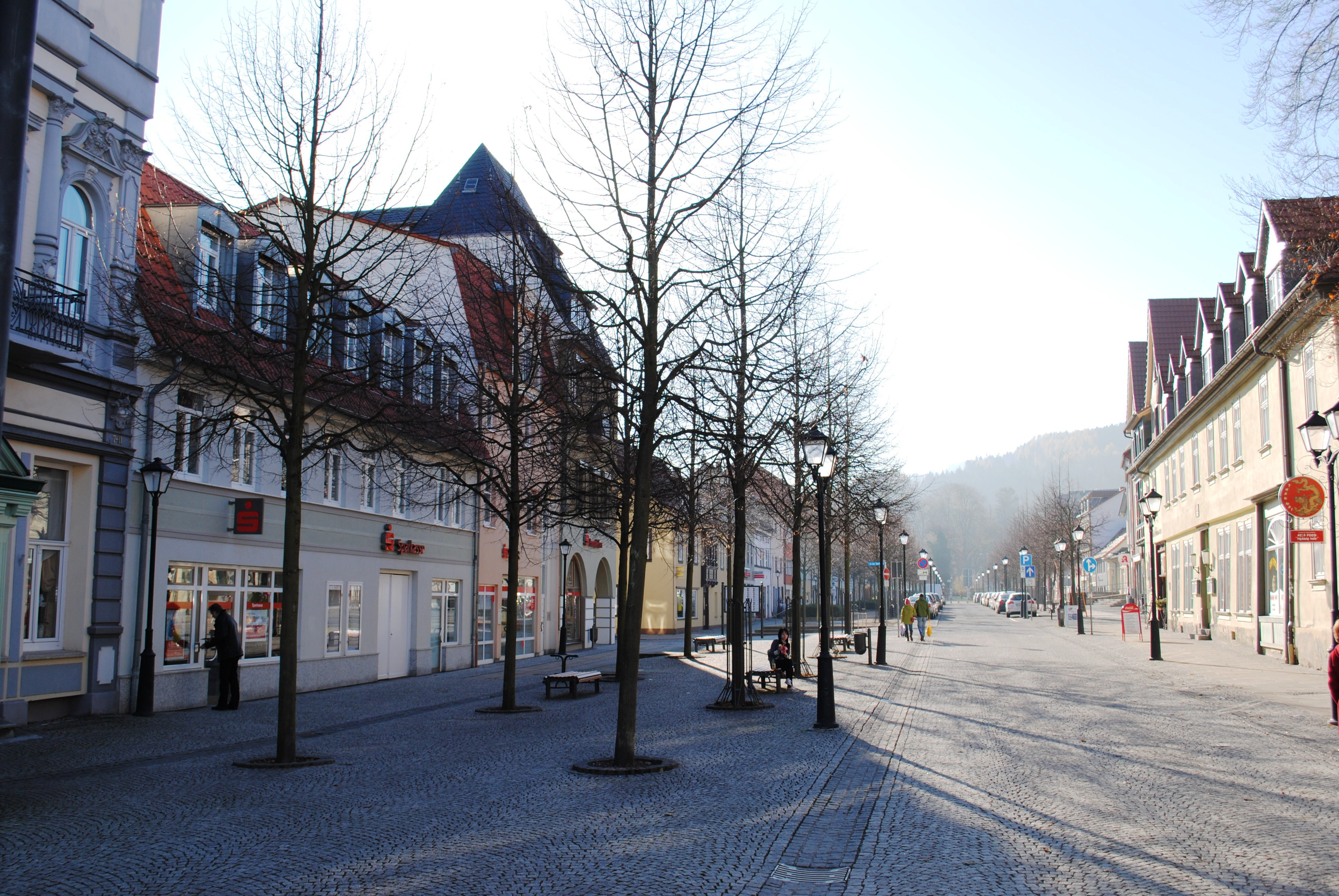
The Lindenstraße, Ilmenau's boulevard

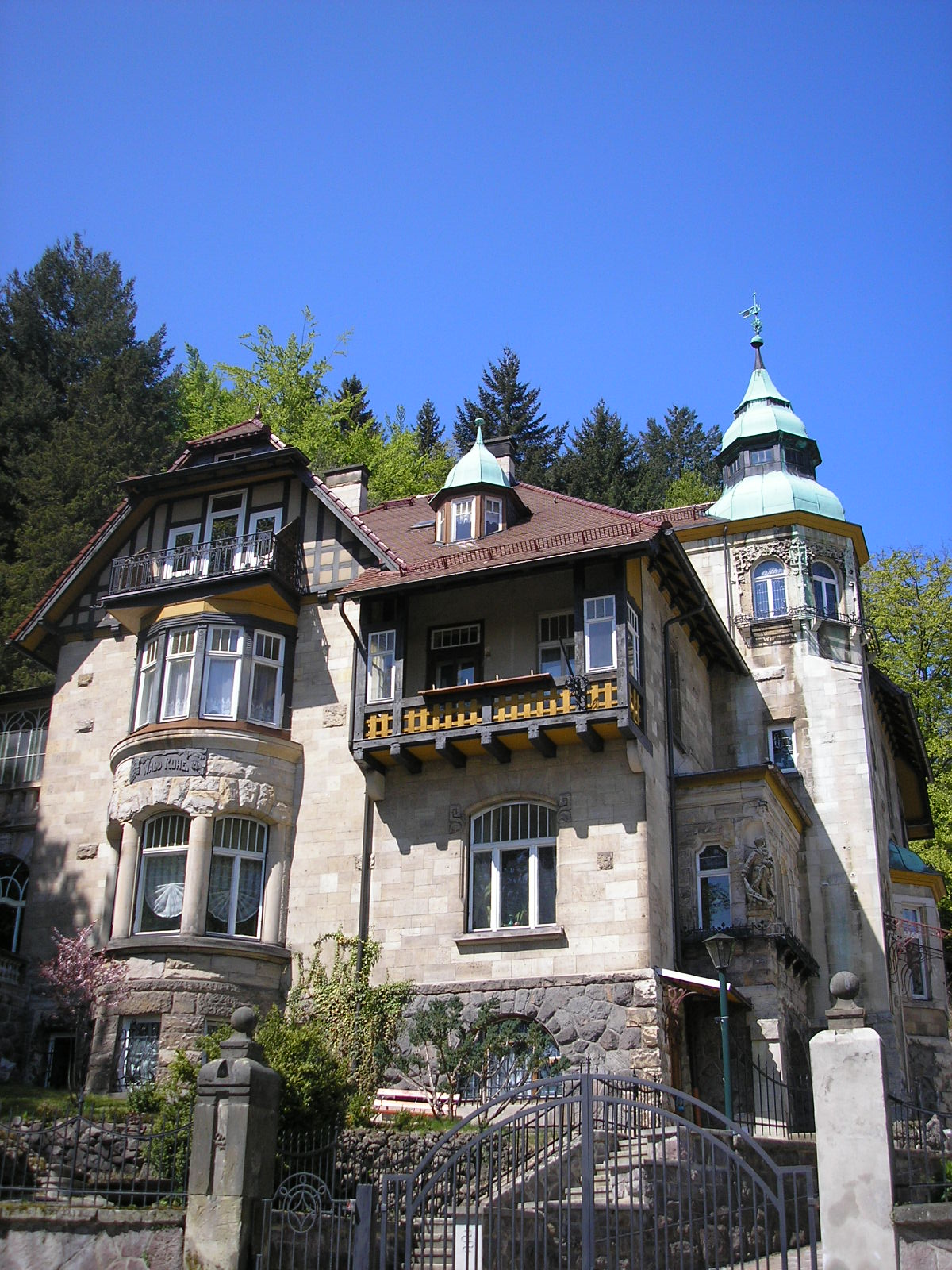
Historistic mansion at Waldstraße

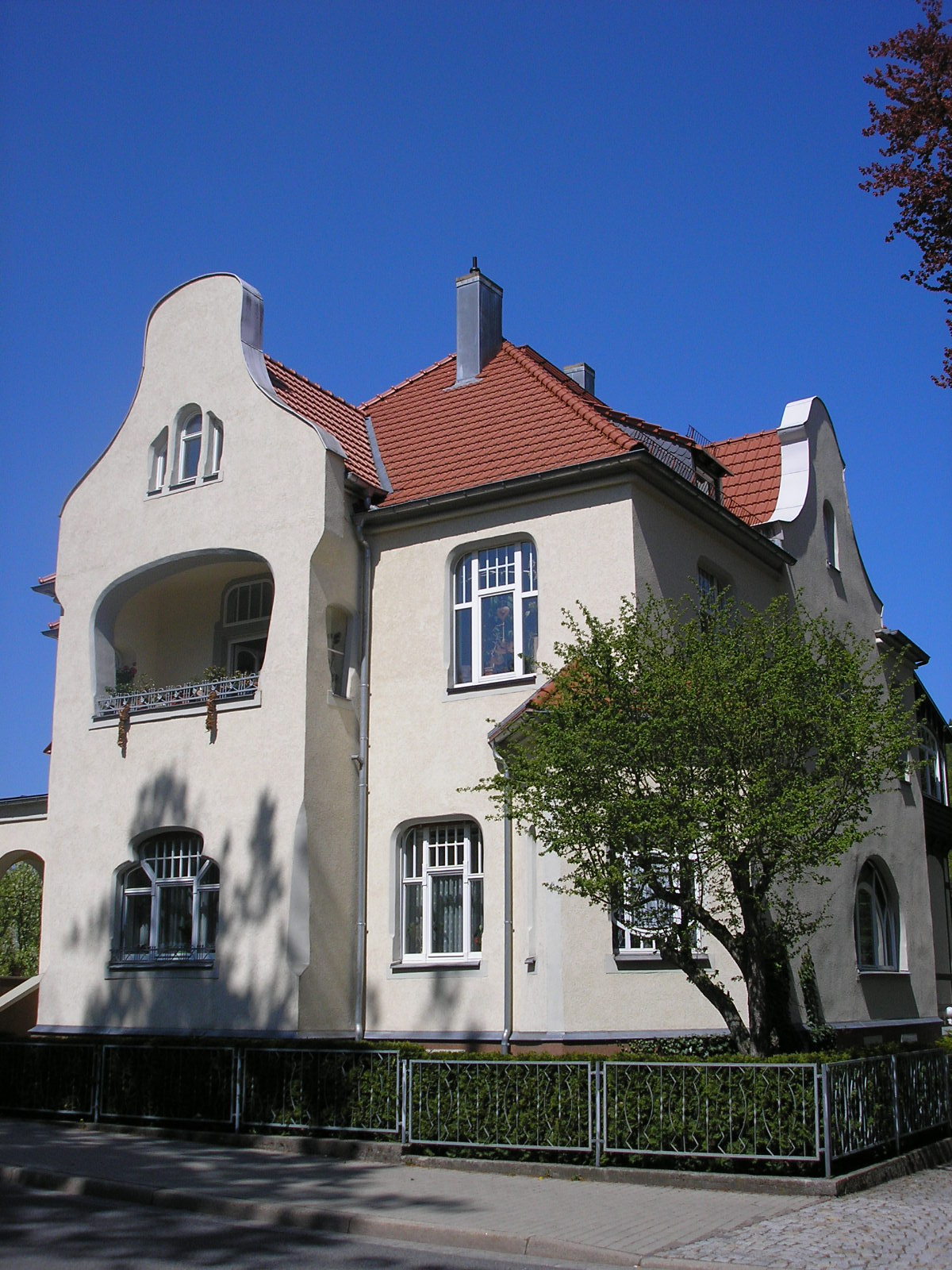
Art Nouveau mansion at Waldstraße

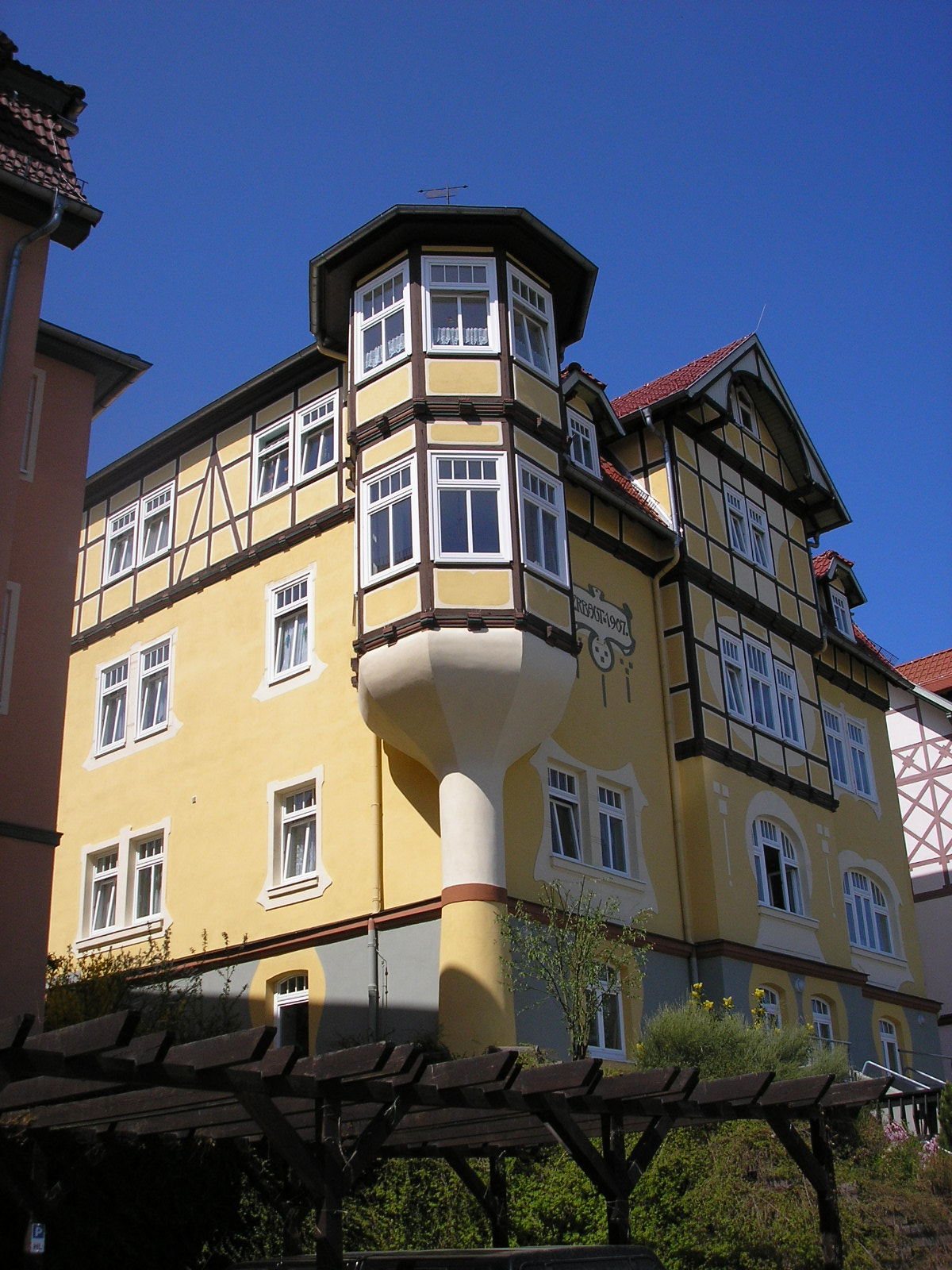
Mansion at Sturmheide

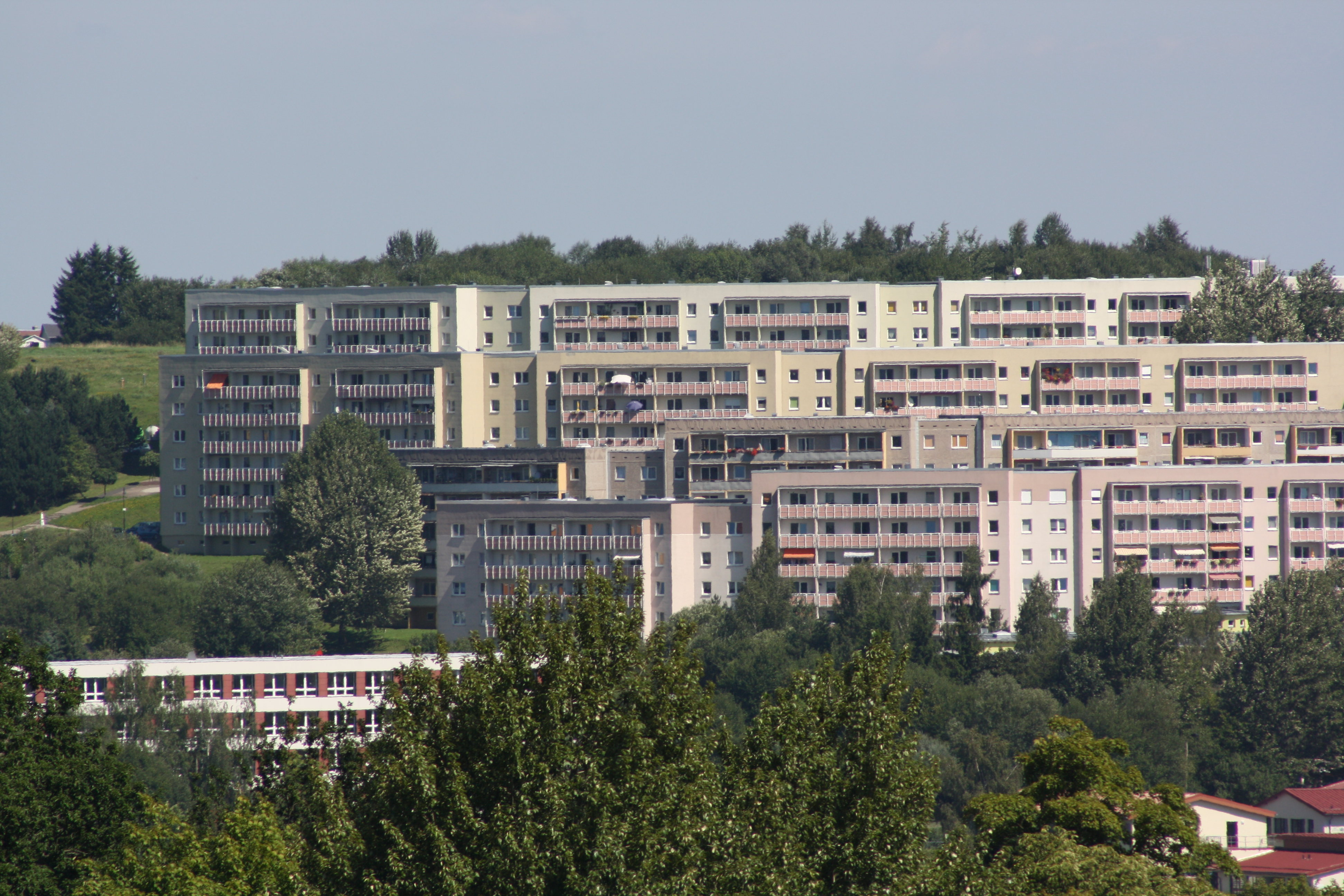
Plattenbau settlement at Pörlitzer Höhe

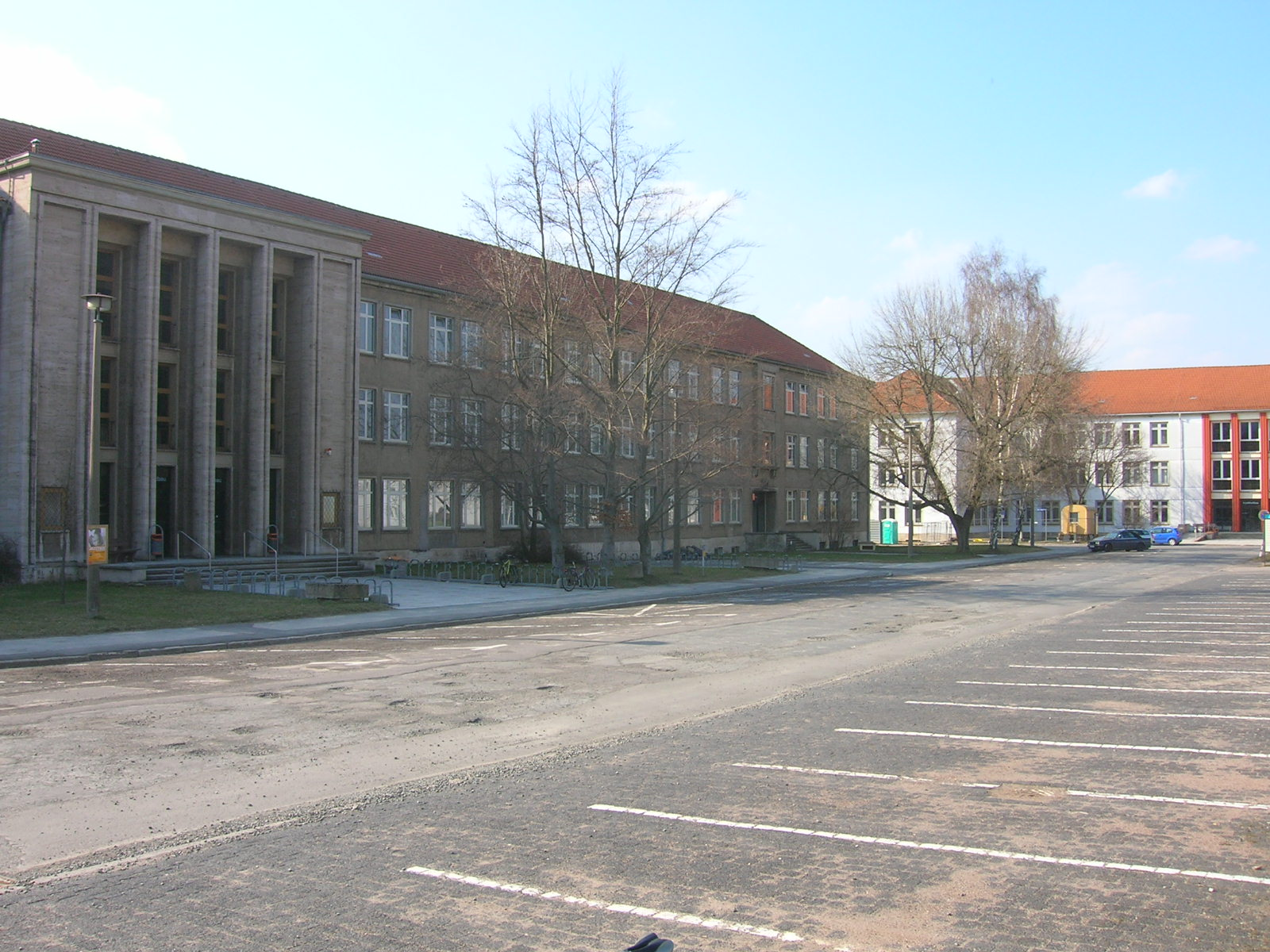
Neo-classicist Helmholtzbau at Ehrenberg campus

=== Sights and architectural heritage ===
==== Older buildings (pre-1870) ====
- The Church of St James at Marktstraße is the Lutheran main church of Ilmenau, built after the town fire of 1752 in late-Baroque style.
- The Holy Cross Church at the cemetery north of the city centre is a small church, built in 1852. Furthermore, the historic cemetery hosts some 18th-century graves and a mourning hall (now reused as a Columbarium), built in 1836 in classicistic style.
- The town hall at the Marktplatz was also built after the last town fire of 1752.
- The Zechenhaus is one of the oldest buildings in Ilmenau, built in 1730. It was in use as seat of the local mining authority.
- The Bergmannskapelle (17th century) is a small wooden chapel, former used by the miners to pray for good luck.
- The Alte Münze (1691) at Wallgraben was the mint, where the Ilmenau Talers were coined around 1700.
- The parsonage at Kirchplatz was built in the 1760s in Baroque style.
- The Alte Försterei (1733) at Wetzlarer Platz is a small Baroque forester's lodge.
- The Wasserburg at Amtsstrasse is a castle ruin, consisting of only few low walls.
- The Kickelhahnturm (1855) and the Goethehäuschen (1783) were built on the top of the Kickelhahn mountain south of the town.
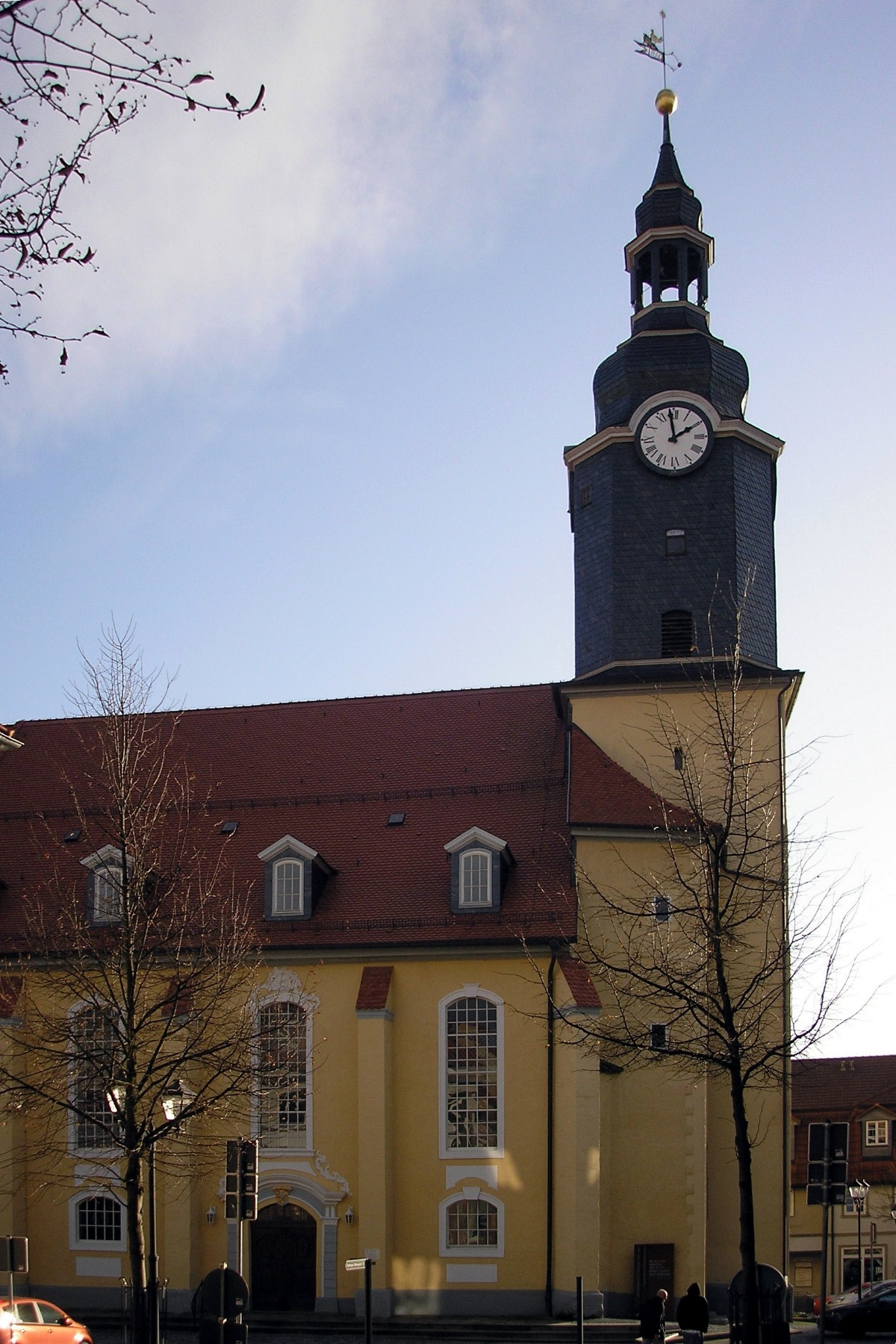
St. James' Church

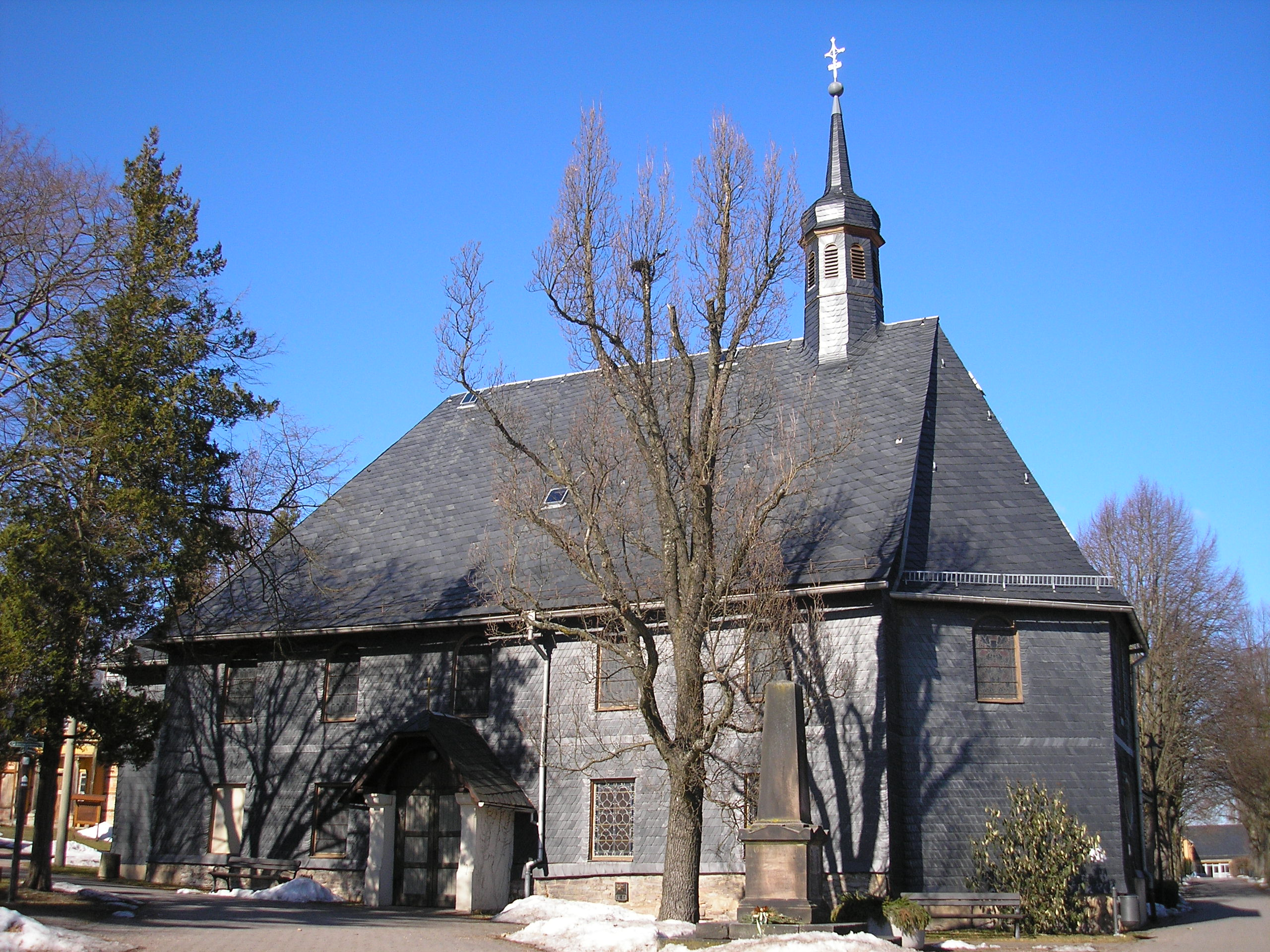
Holy Cross Church

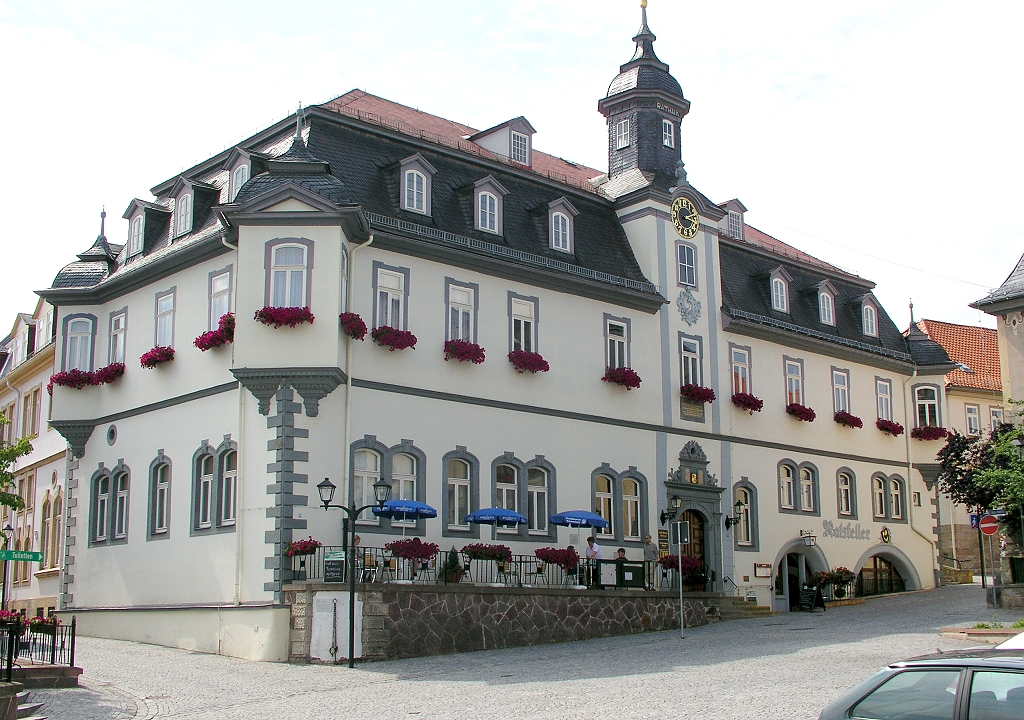
Town hall

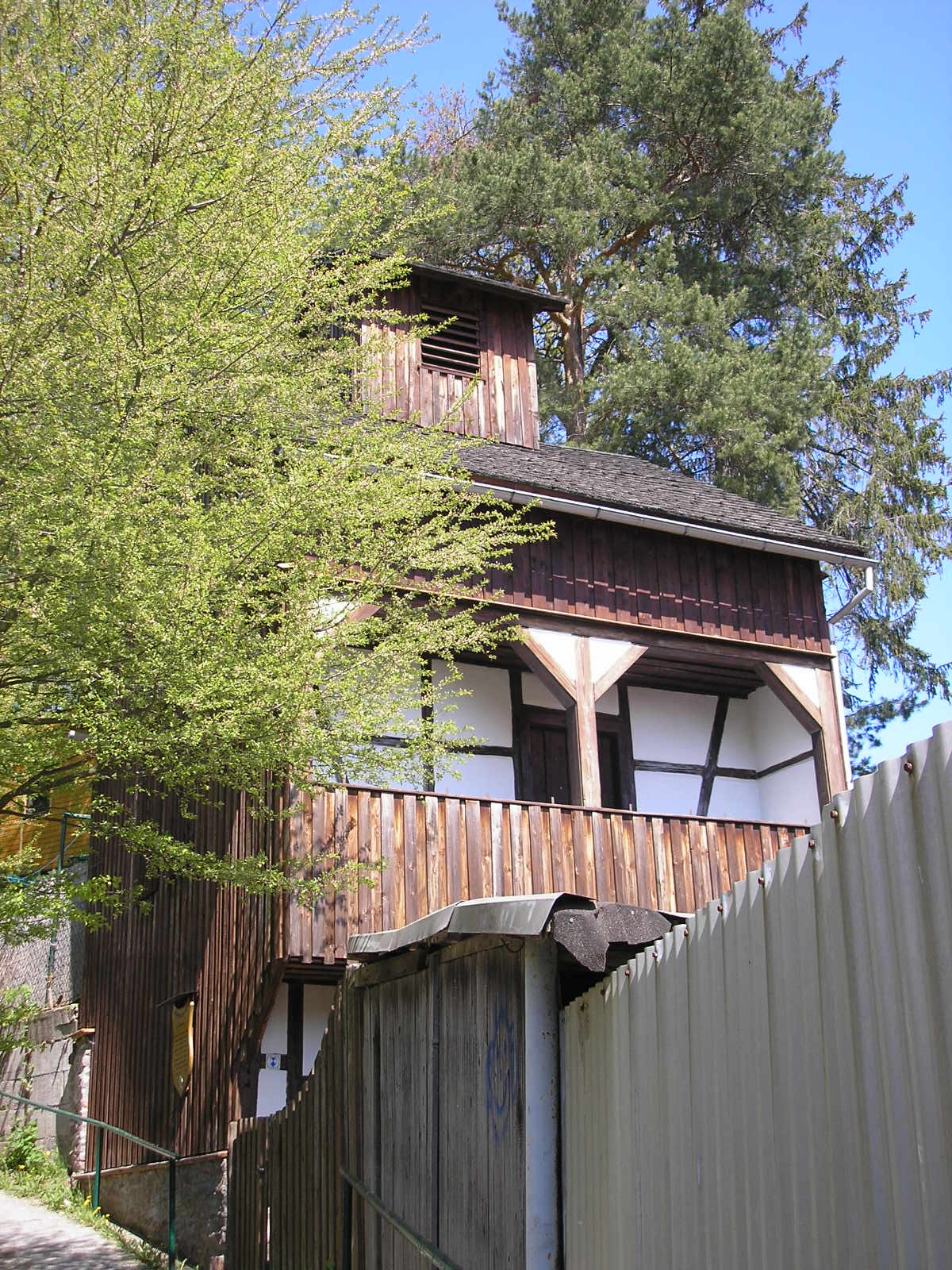
Bergmannskapelle

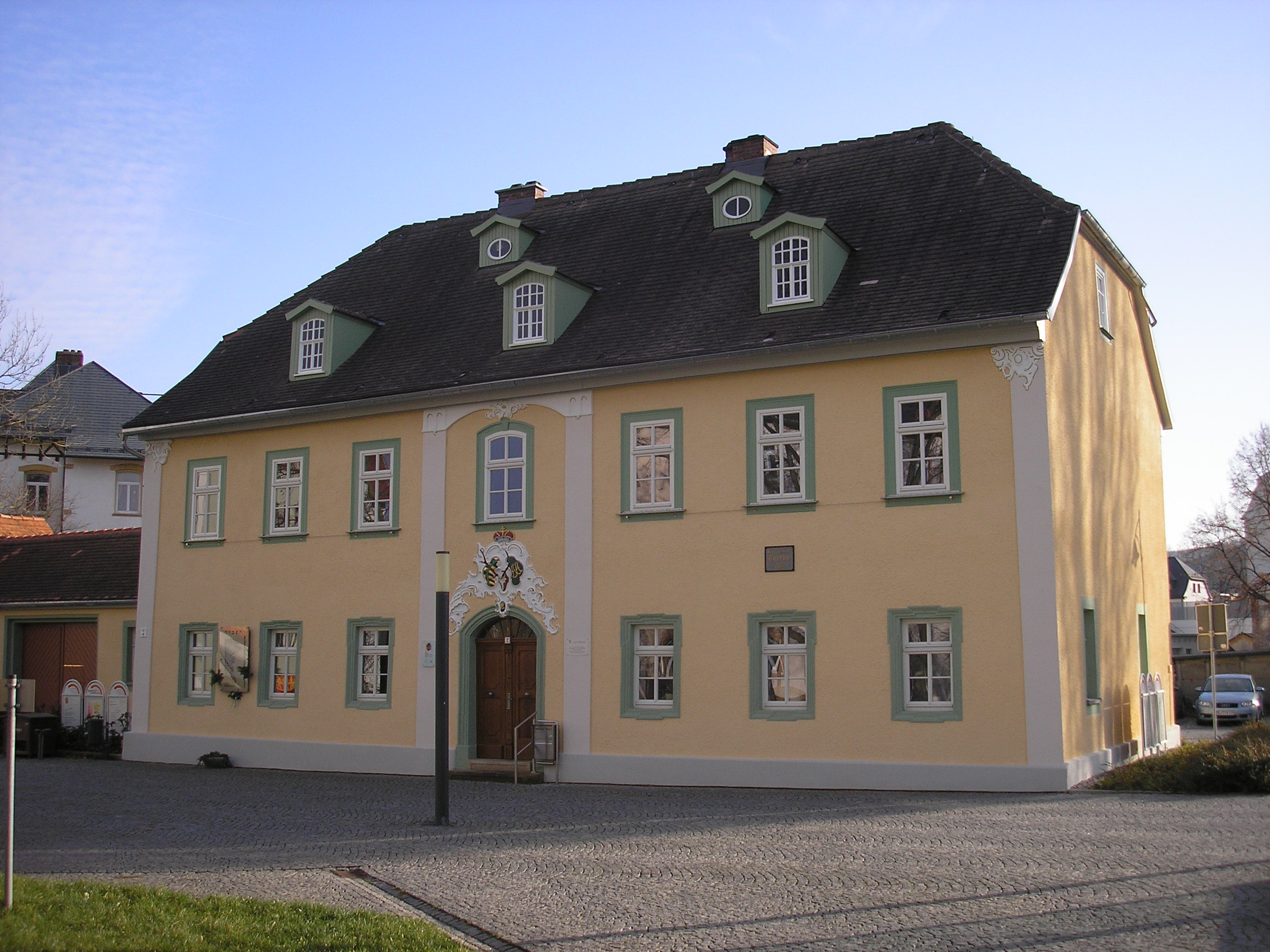
Alte Försterei

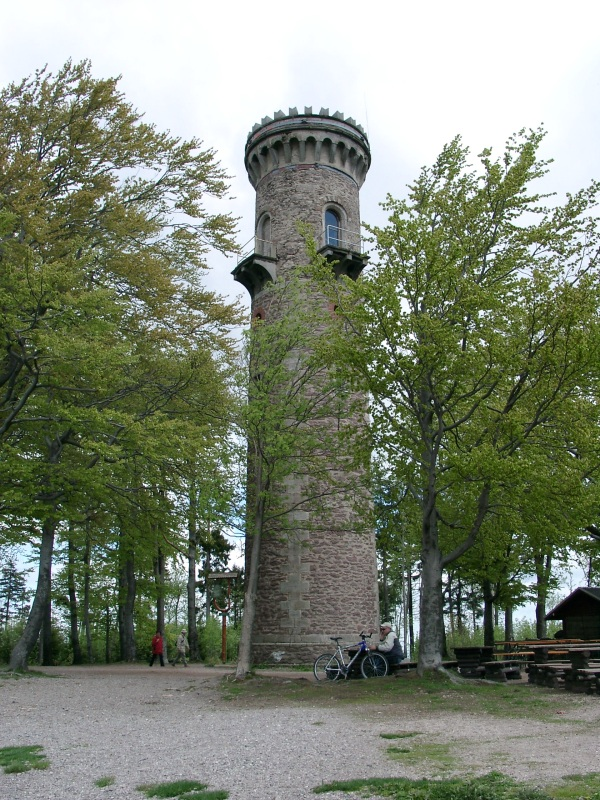
Kickelhahnturm

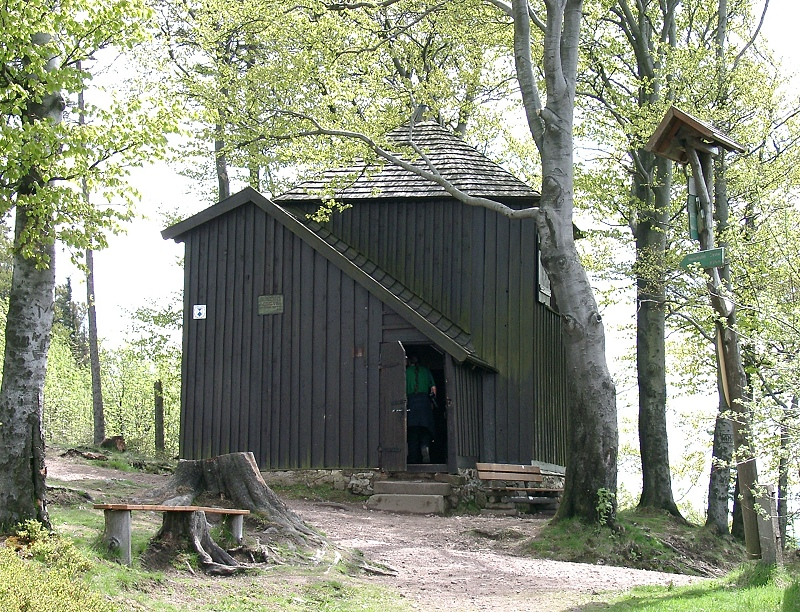
Goethehäuschen at Kickelhahn

==== Modern architecture (after 1870) ====
- The Neues Technikum at Weimarer Straße was built in 1926 for enlarging the university's precursor in modern style.
- A department store at Friedrich-Hofmann-Straße, built in 1928 has a Bauhaus-style glass façade.
- A house at Naumannstraße was built from 1929 to 1932 in international-modern Bauhaus-style by Arthur Schröder.
- The St. Joseph's Church at Unterpörlitzer Straße was built between 1979 and 1983 as Catholic parish church in modern style.
- The Goethe memorial at the Marktplatz was established in 1996.
- The new Audimax of the university was built during the 2000s in modern style, same as a new auditorium's building in form of a glass cube at Weimarer Strasse.
- The Bundesanstalt für Wasserbau, a federal authority based in Ilmenau, was built around 2000 in boomerang-style.
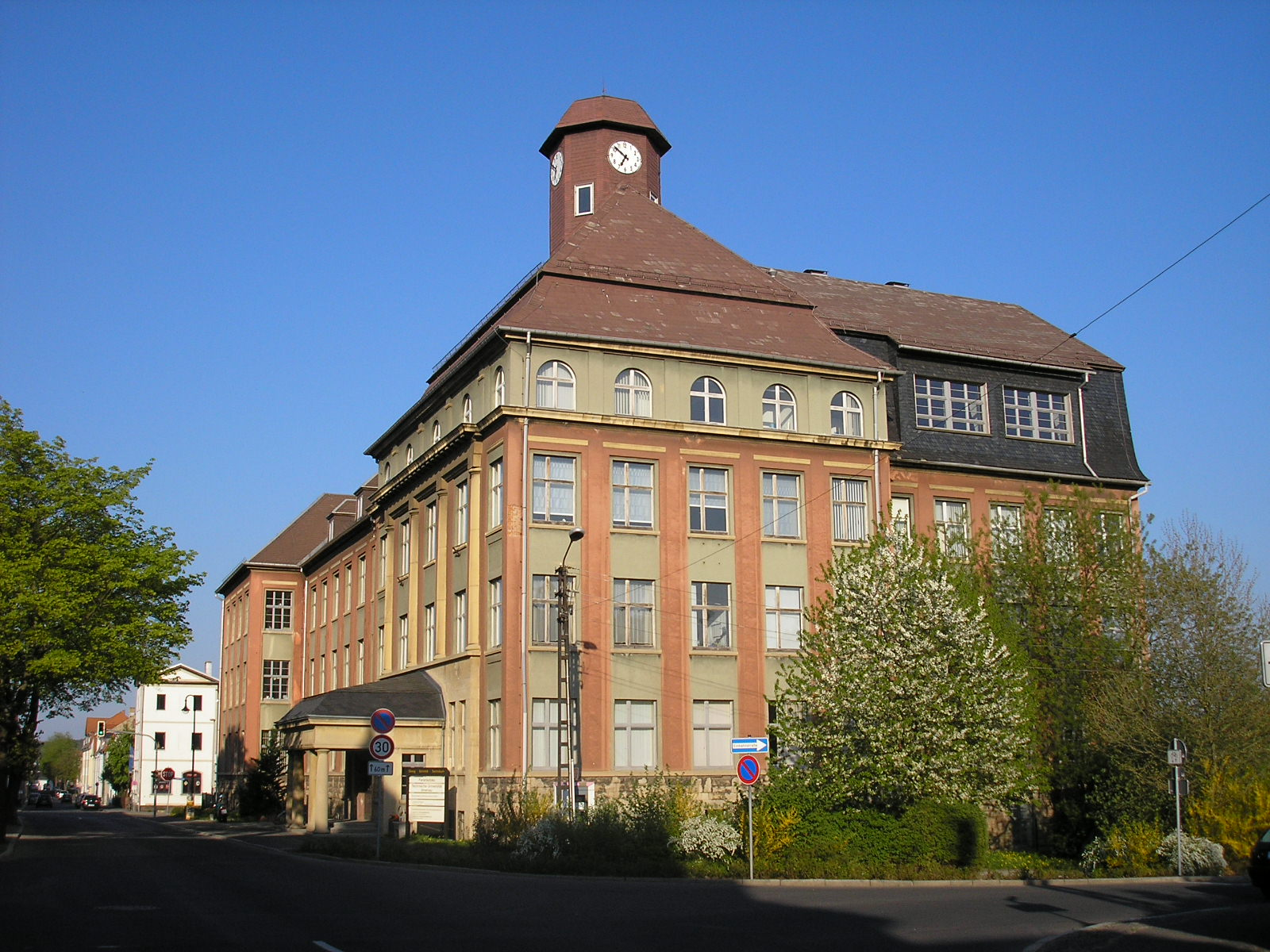
Neues Technikum

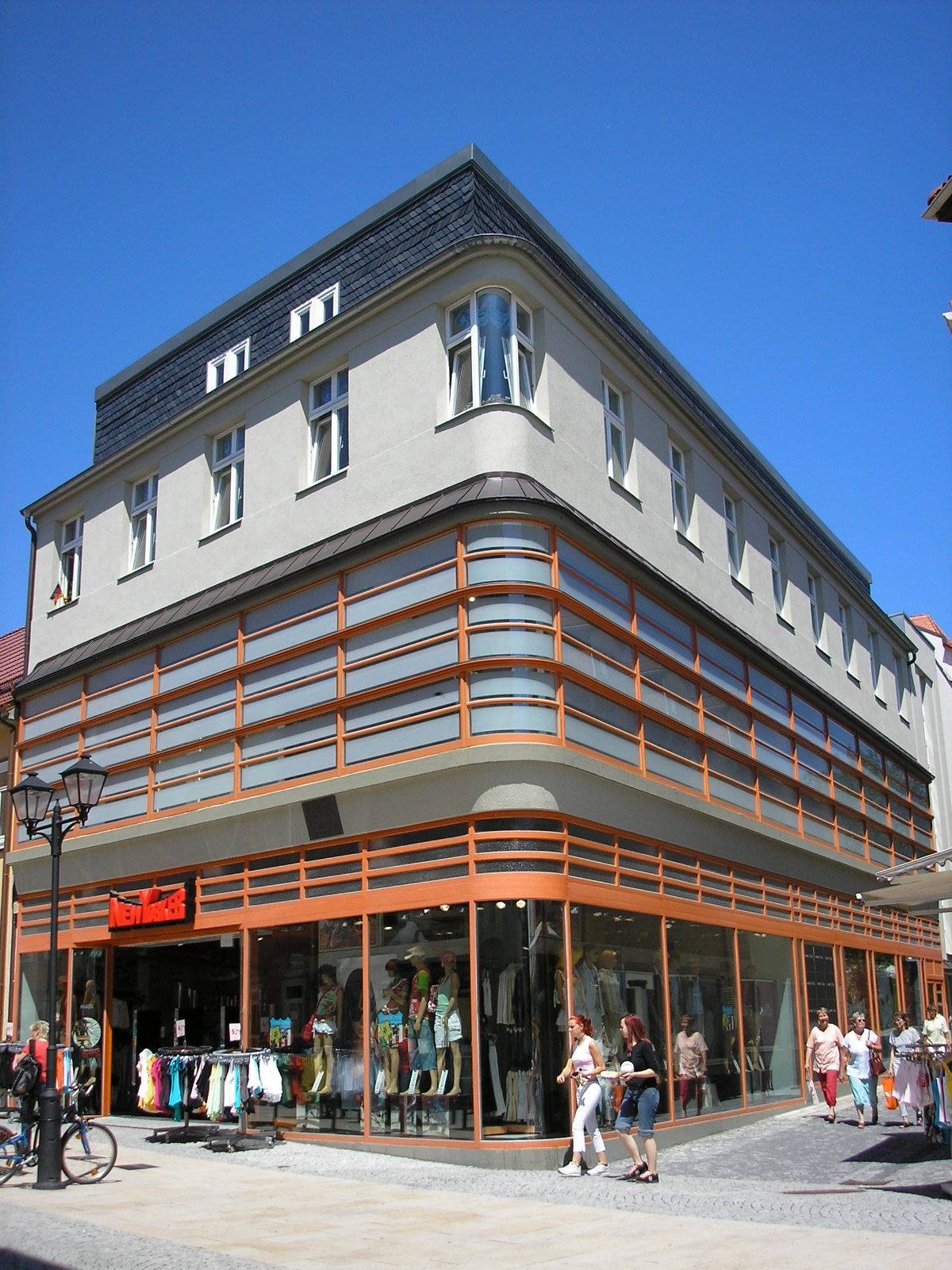
Department store in Bauhaus-style

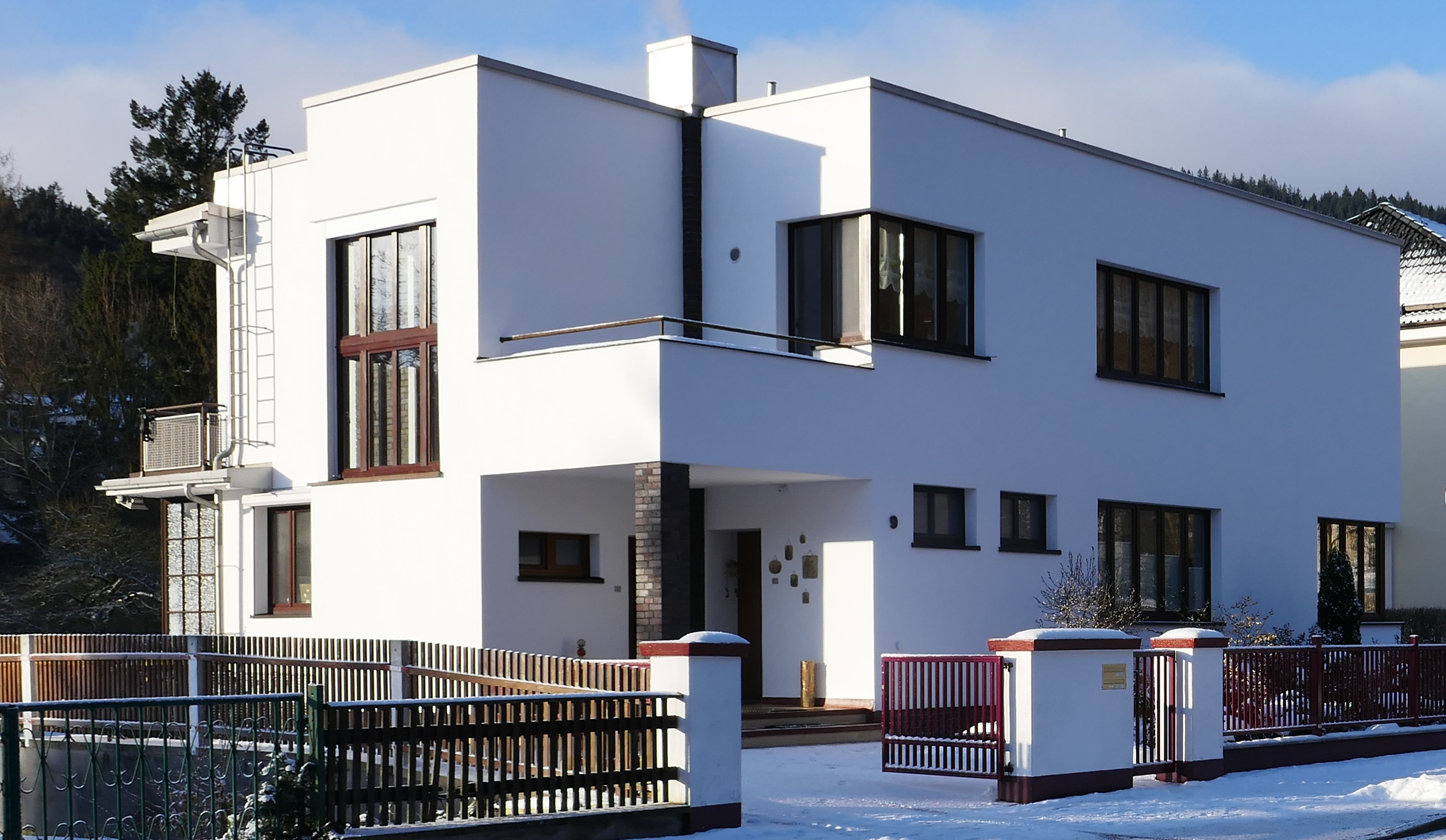
Bauhaus-style house at Naumannstraße

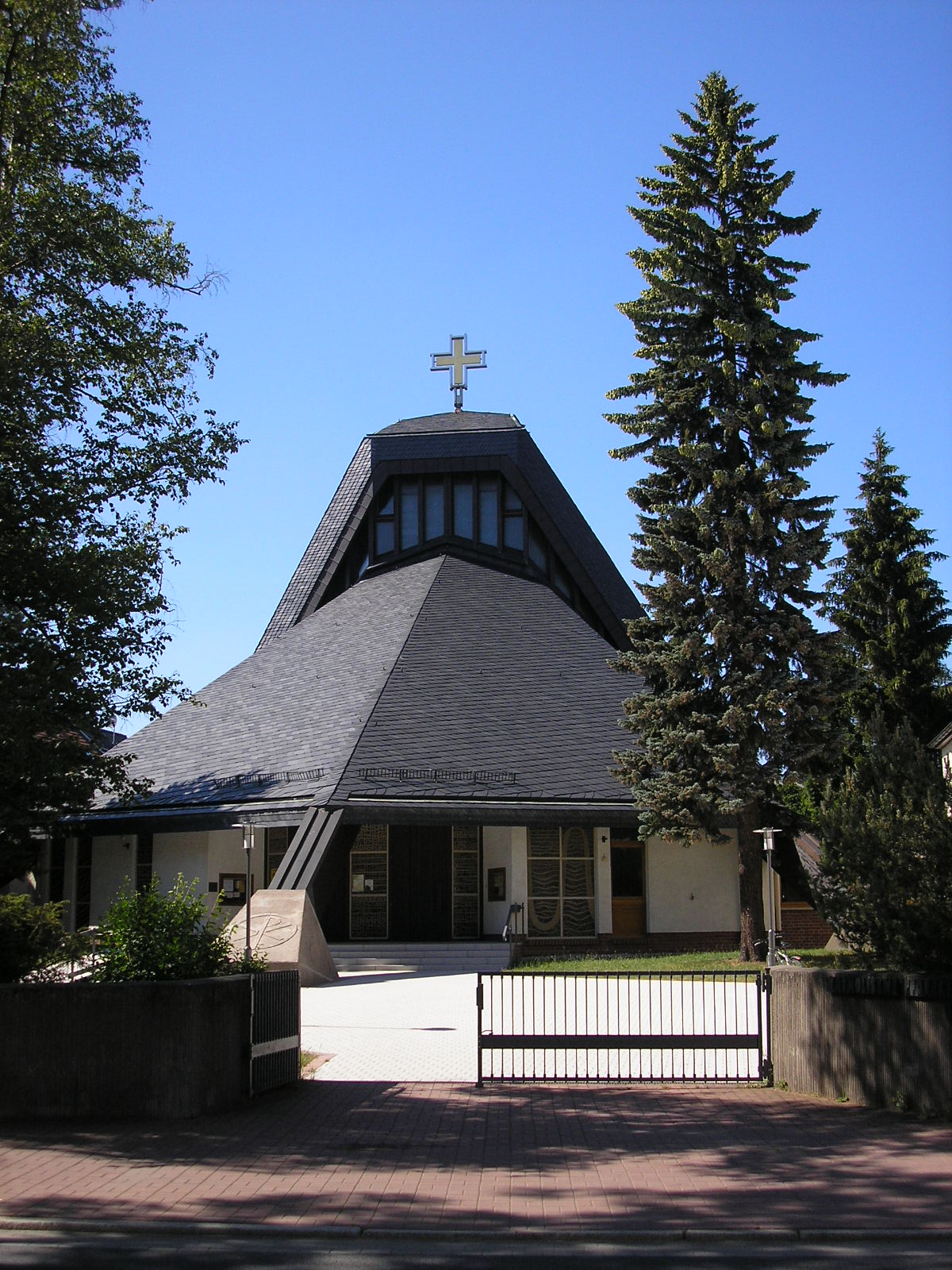
St. Joseph's Church

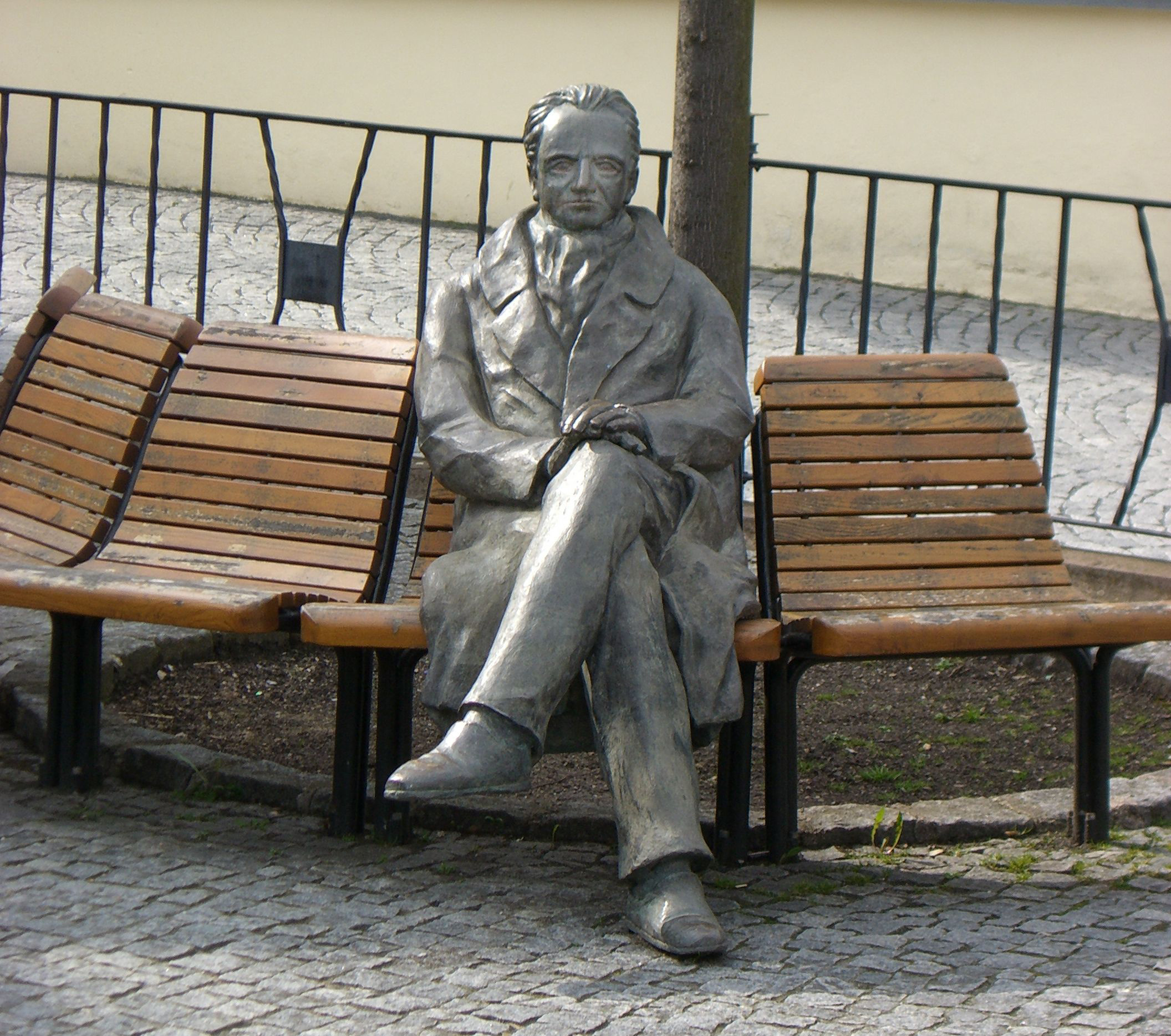
Goethe memorial

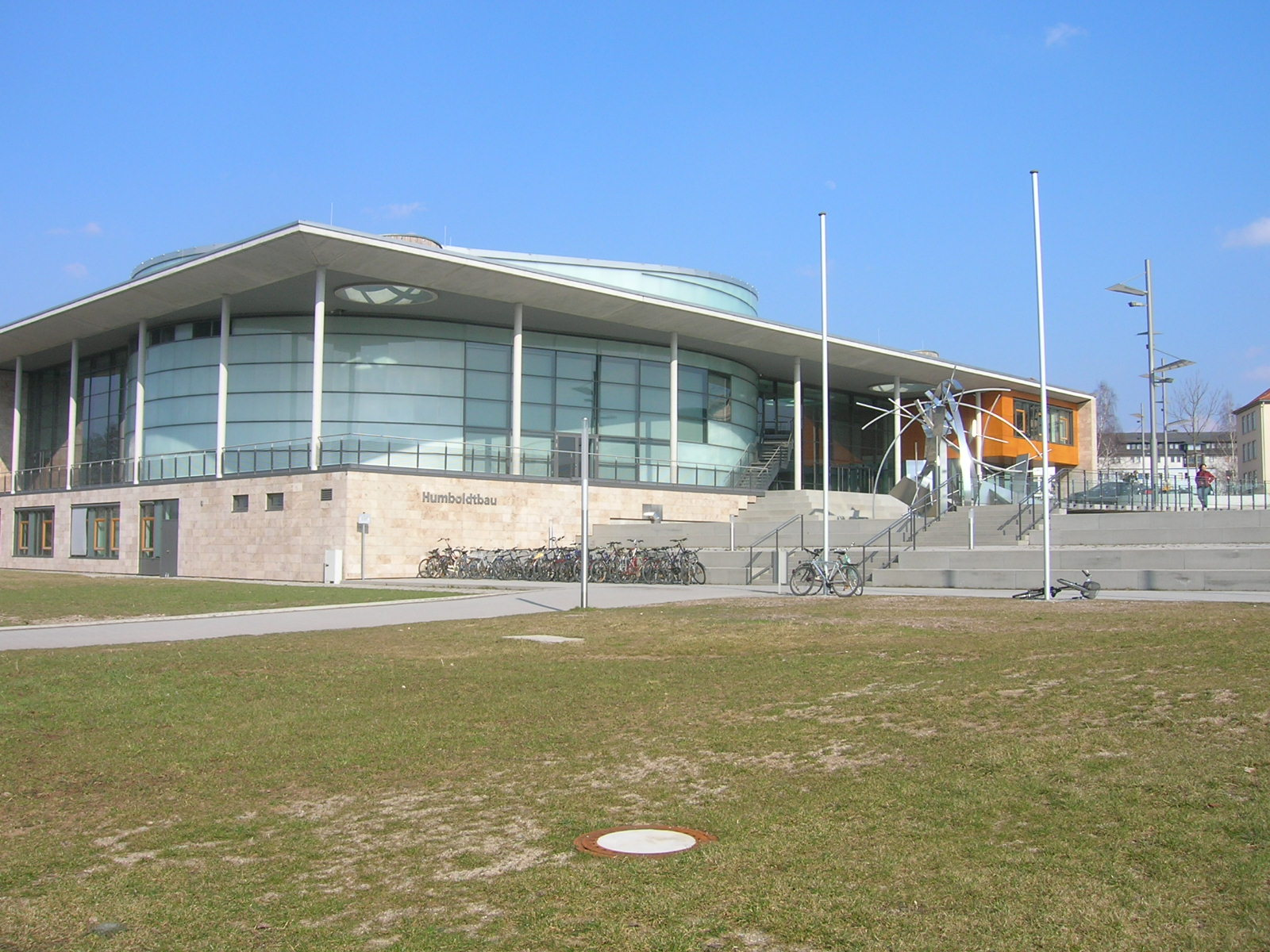
University's new Audimax

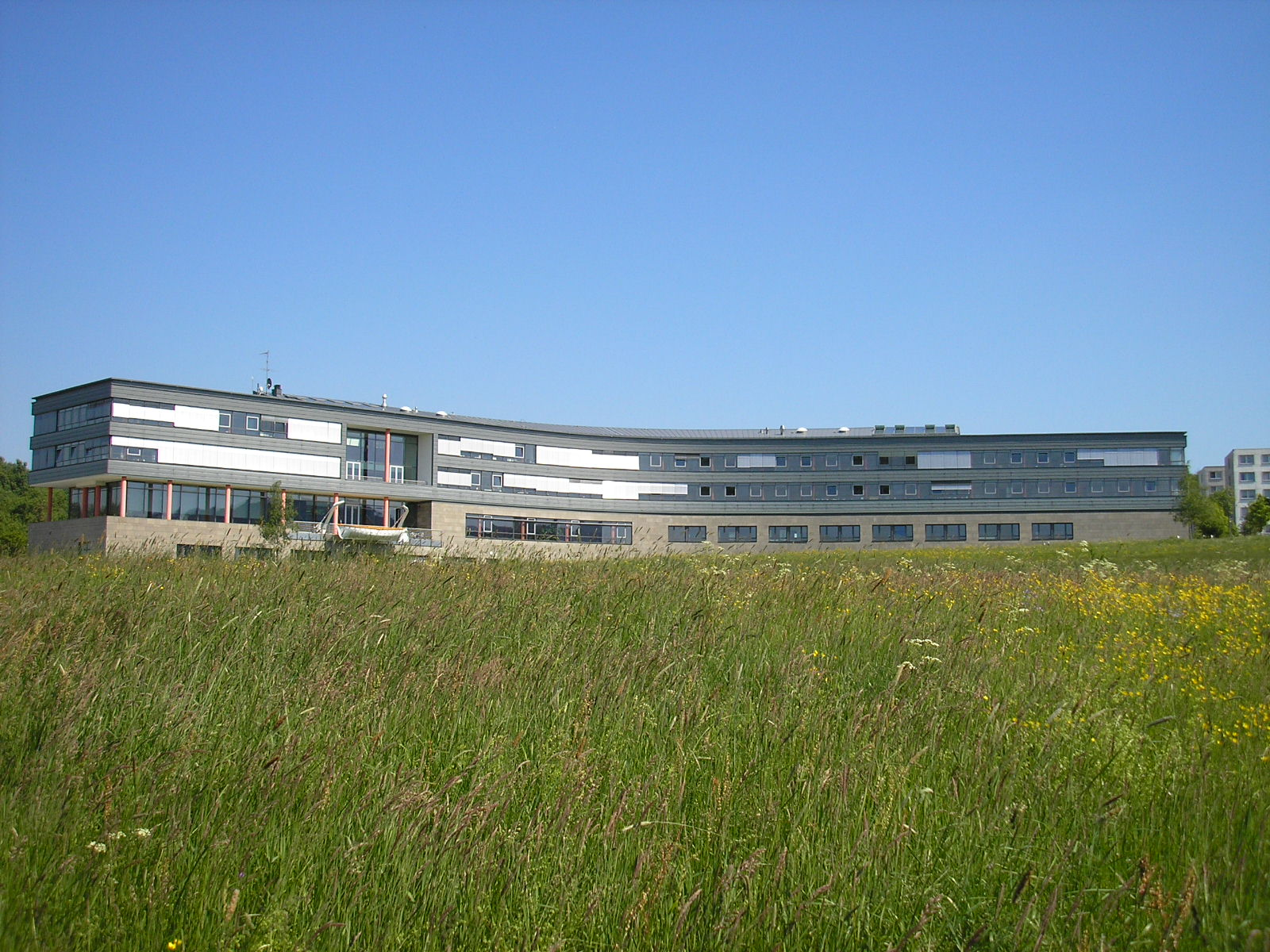
Bundesanstalt für Wasserbau

== Economy ==
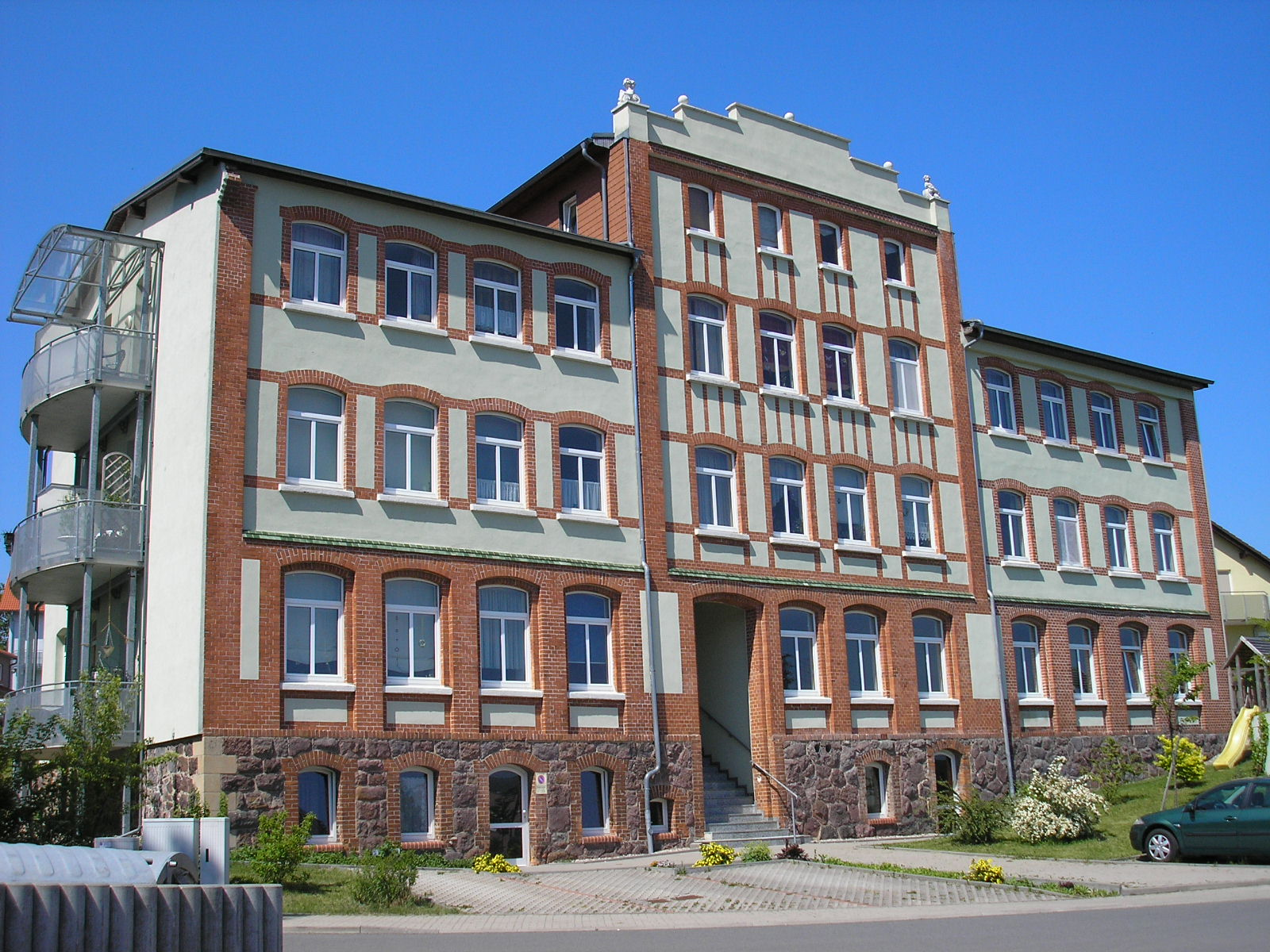
Former porcelain factory "Arno Fischer"

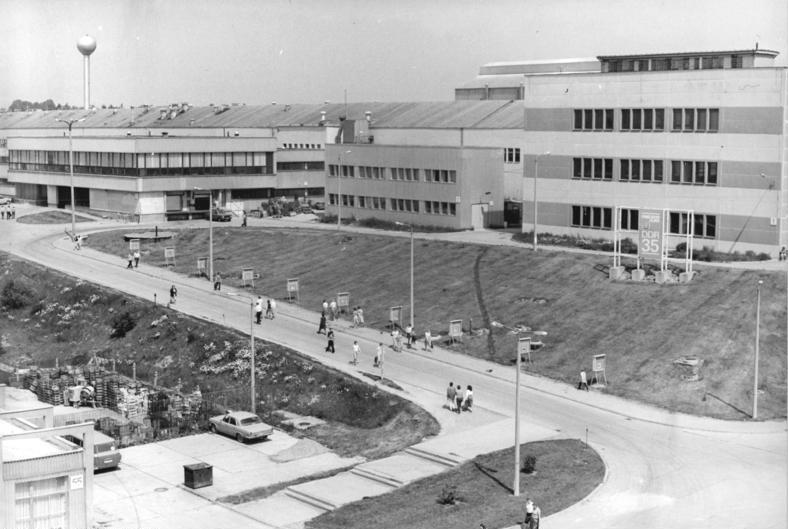
Glass Kombinat in 1984

Agriculture plays an insignificant role in the economy of Ilmenau as only 18% of the municipal territory are cultivated. The soil is not that fertile and the climate is harsh. The main crops are maize and rapeseed/ In addition there is cattle farming on some areas. 64% of the territory is forest, so that wood production is important in Ilmenau.

Industry was based on the production of glassware and porcelain during the 19th and 20th century with many large and famous companies (porcelain brands: Henneberg (est. 1777), Metzler & Ortloff (est. 1873)). The porcelain industry did not survive the structural change after German reunification in 1990, so that factories closed like most in Western Germany earlier during the 1970s and 1980s. The glass industry always concentrated on laboratory glassware such as thermometers, test tubes and other chemical and medical requisites. During the GDR period, all the glass factories of Ilmenau and the surrounding villages were centralized in a new Kombinat, opened in 1976 with 5,000 workers in Ilmenau being one of the biggest glass producers within the Comecon states. After reunification, the factory survived and is still a leading company for laboratory glassware in Germany, nevertheless, due to rationalization efforts during the 1990s, the number of employees decreased to 225. After 1990, new branches were established in Ilmenau. Mechanical engineering and polymer processing are now playing an especially important role in Ilmenau, as is software engineering. These new sectors benefit from the vicinity to the university and the research institutes. In 2012, there were 26 companies in industrial production with more than 20 workers employing 1,500 persons and generating a turnover of €170 million.

Local employment (such as retail, hospital, cinema etc.) include serving the university in particular (which is the biggest employer with 2,000 employees), but also research and industrial services. Tourism has also played a large role since the town became a spa in the 1830s. In 2012, there were 49,000 hotel guests having 114,000 overnight stays in Ilmenau.

== Transport ==
=== Rail ===
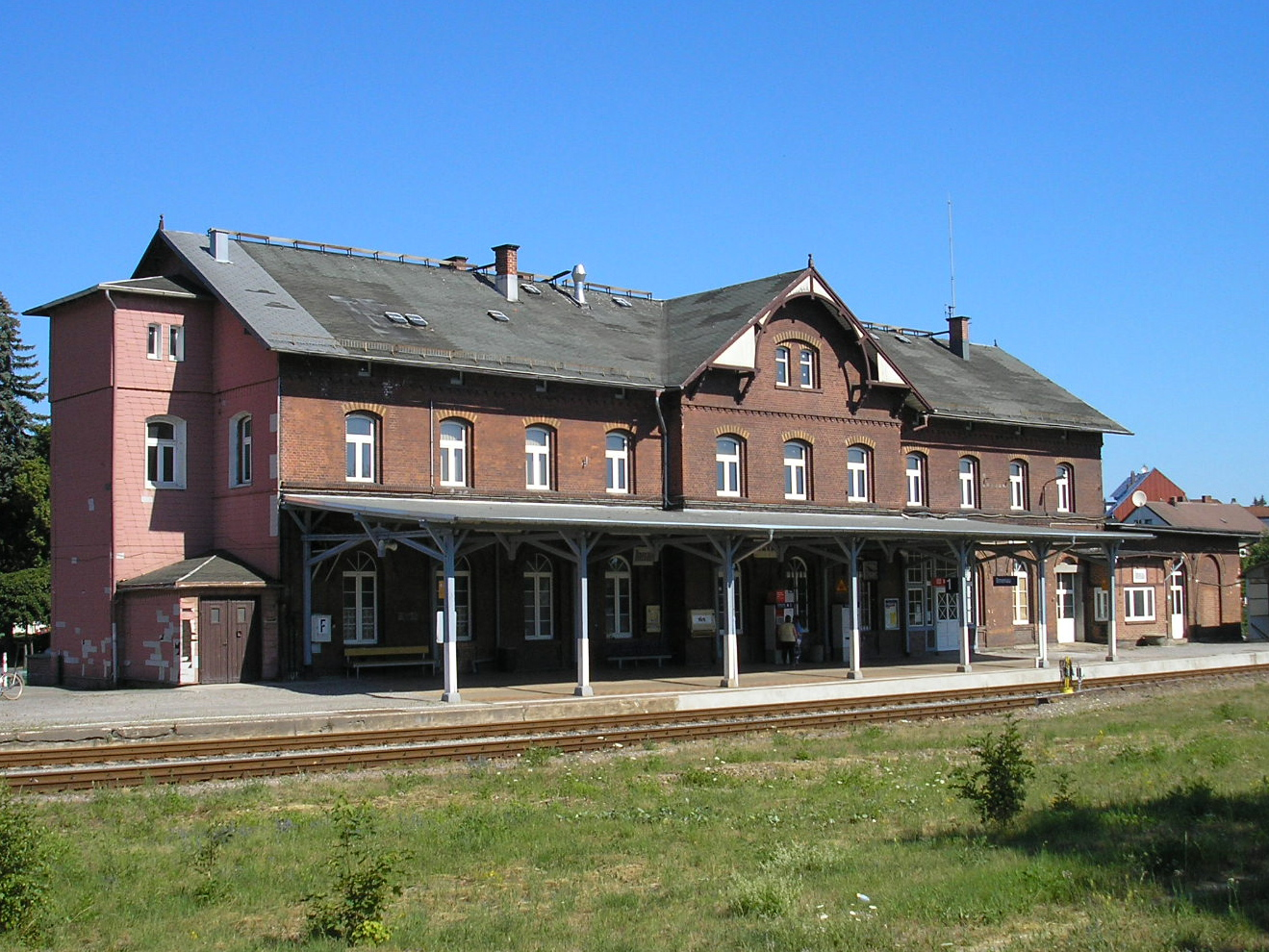
The station (prior the reconstruction) in 2006

Ilmenau station is located in the city centre on the Plaue–Themar railway, which opened to Ilmenau in 1879. Ilmenau station and stations in the districts of Pörlitzer Höhe and Roda are connected by an hourly service to Erfurt via Arnstadt. Another line to Großbreitenbach was opened in 1881 and closed in 1998 and a third one to Themar via Schleusingen opened in 1904. Since 1998, there has no longer been a regular service, but there are some historical steam locomotives running at special events on the line, which crosses the Thuringian Forest on one of the steepest lines in Germany (with a gradient of 6%). Freight transport by rail is no longer important, with the exception of a train transporting the town's refuse to the incinerator at Leuna. The Nuremberg–Erfurt high-speed railway passes through the municipal boundaries, but no trains stop in Ilmenau as of 2021. There is debate whether the Ilmenau-Wolfsberg service station should be served by passenger trains.

=== Road ===
Ilmenau is situated close to the motorways Bundesautobahn 71 to Erfurt in the north and Würzburg/Nuremberg (A 73) to the south. Near the town, the Autobahn crosses the Thuringian Forest with some of Germany's longest tunnels and bridges. Furthermore, there were three Bundesstraßen connecting Ilmenau: the Bundesstraße 4 to Erfurt in the north and Coburg in the south (annulled after the opening of A 71 during the 2000s), the Bundesstraße 87 to Weimar in the north-east (now starting at the Autobahn some kilometres north-east of the town) and the Bundesstraße 88 to Eisenach in the north-west and Rudolstadt in the east, which was relocated around Ilmenau as a bypass (via the A 71 in the north and on a new line in the east).

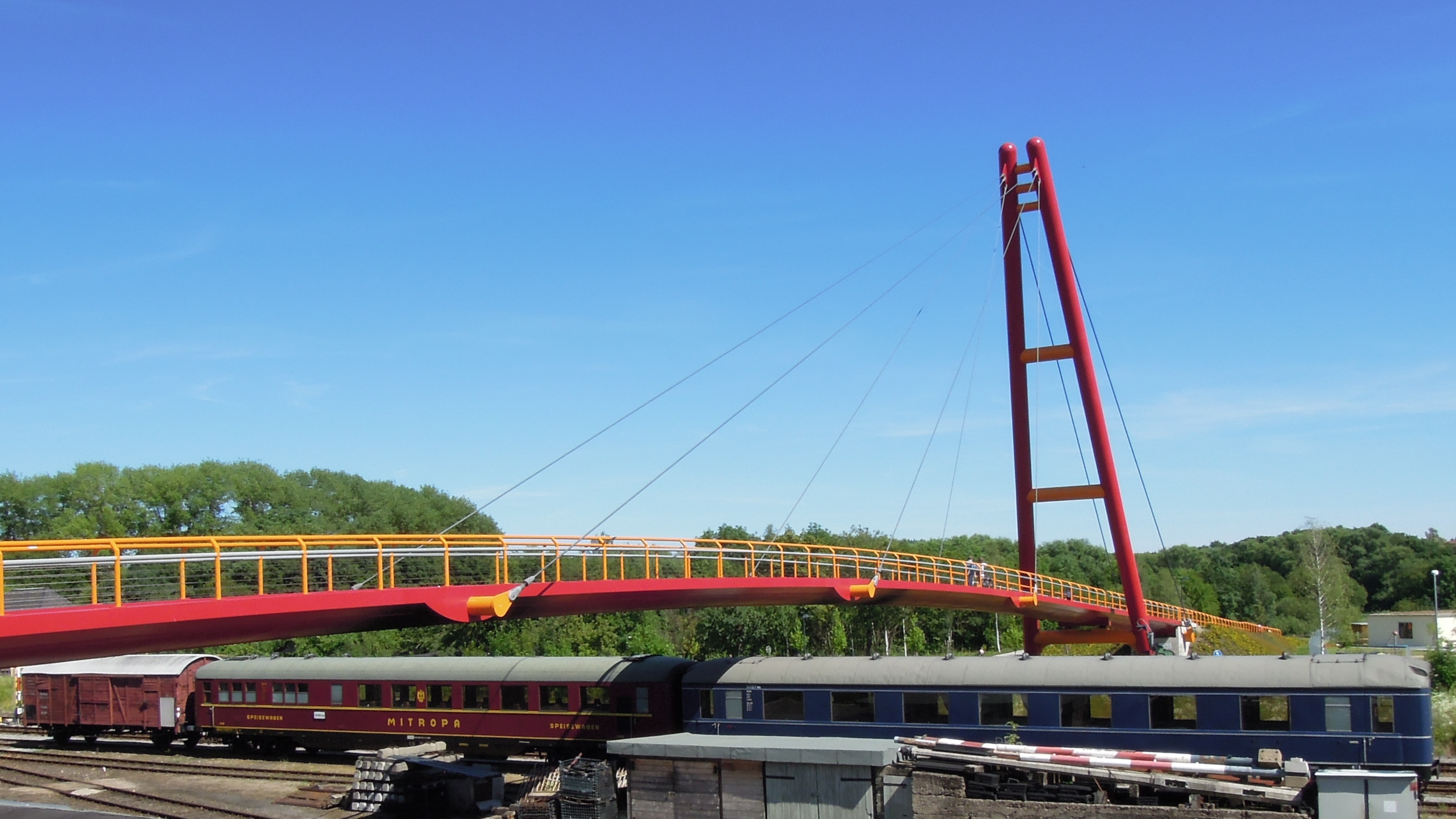
Station bridge

=== Air ===
The nearest local airport to Ilmenau is the Erfurt–Weimar Airport, approx. 40 km (25 mi) to the north, which serves mostly for holiday flights to the Mediterranean and other touristic regions. The next major airports are Frankfurt Airport, Berlin Brandenburg Airport and Munich Airport. Some holidaymakers also use Nuremberg Airport which has a wider range of destinations than Erfurt Airport and is closer than Munich Airport.

=== Bicycle ===
Cycling is becoming ever more popular since the construction of quality cycle paths began in the 1990s. There is the Ilm track from the Rennsteig in the Thuringian Forest to the Saale valley at the Saxony-Anhalt border via Ilmenau and Weimar. In addition there are cycle paths that connect to the Gera track (in Elgersburg) to Erfurt nearby and to the Saale valley in the east via Gehren, Königsee and Rudolstadt. Many paths through the forest are used by mountain bikers, since mountain biking is very popular in the region. There are few cycle lanes for inner city everyday traffic but using side roads and paths is working well. Despite the hilly terrain in some parts, Ilmenau is a cycle-friendly city owing in part to the high percentage of residents being students.

=== Public transit ===
Public transport includes a bus network connecting the city centre with the outskirts and neighbouring villages.

== Education and research ==
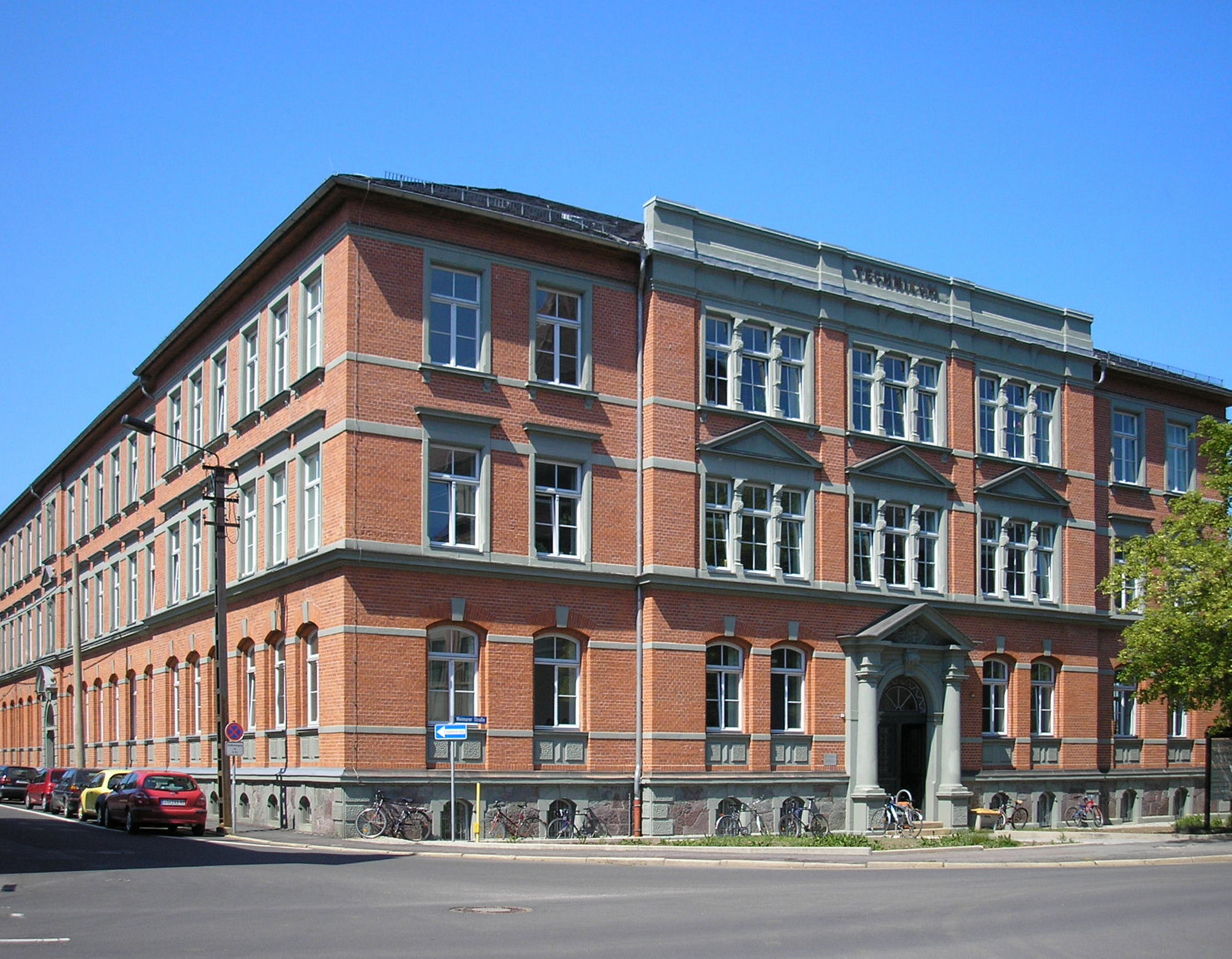
The university's old main building

The Technische Universität Ilmenau has about 4,000 students and is Thuringia's third-largest university, founded in 1894 as Thüringisches Technikum, converted to a university in 1992. Its emphasis is on mathematics, physics, informatics, several engineering disciplines and media studies. Furthermore, there are two grammar schools in Ilmenau. They are the Gymnasium "Am Lindenberg", which focuses on languages and economics, and Gymnasium "Goetheschule", which specialises in science and mathematics as an elite boarding school in addition to the common curriculum.

Notable research institutes are:

- Fraunhofer Institute for Digital Media Technology
- Fraunhofer Institute of Optronics, System Technologies and Image Exploitation
- Institut für Mikroelektronik- und Mechatronik-Systeme

== Politics ==
=== Mayor and city council ===
The current mayor Daniel Schultheiß (Independent) has been in office since November 2018.

== Twin towns – sister cities ==
Ilmenau is twinned with:

- Blue Ash, United States
- Homburg, Germany
- Wetzlar, Germany
- Târgu Mureș, Romania

== Notable people ==
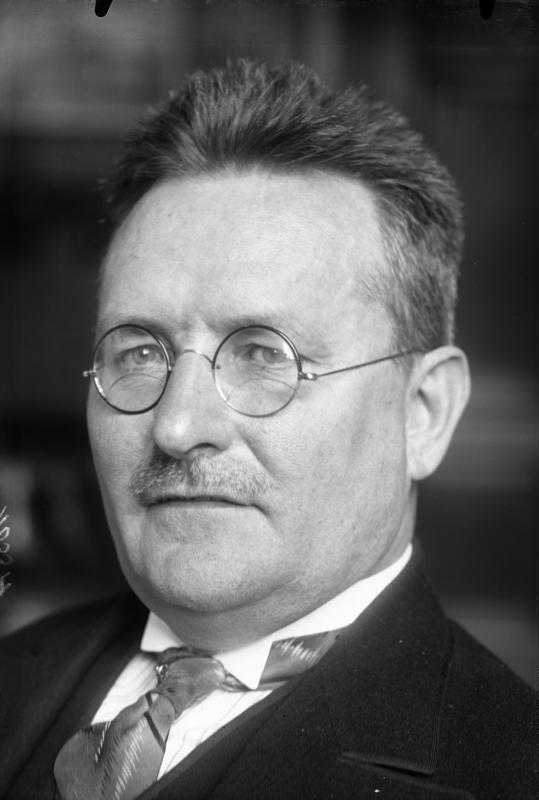
Paul Löbe in 1924

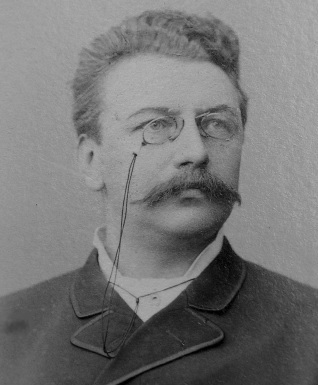
Friedrich Christoph Pelizaeus around 1900

- Andreas Libavius (1555–1616), philosopher and chemist, taught in Ilmenau
- Karl Ludwig von Knebel (1744–1834), poet, retired to Ilmenau
- Corona Schröter (1751–1802), singer, died in Ilmenau
- Johann Karl Wilhelm Voigt (1752–1821), mineralogist, worked and died in Ilmenau
- Friedrich Christoph Pelizaeus (1859–1942), neurologist, temporarily spa doctor in Ilmenau
- Marie Gutheil-Schoder (1874–1935), soprano, died in Ilmenau
- Paul Löbe (1875–1963), politician (SPD), worked as a printer in Ilmenau
- Theodor Eicke (1892–1943), high-ranking SS officer, studied in Ilmenau
- Fritz Sauckel (1894–1946), Nazi war criminal, studied in Ilmenau
- Fritz Reinhardt (1895–1969), Nazi Finance Minister
- Robert Döpel (1895–1982), nuclear physicist, died in Ilmenau
- Michael Roth (1936–2019), engineer
- Jan Behrendt (born 1967), luger
- Wolfram Fiedler (1951–1988), luger
- Matthias Platzeck (born 1953), politician (SPD), studied and graduated in Ilmenau
- Hartwig Gauder (1954–2020), walker, Olympic champion, lived in Ilmenau
- Ute Oberhoffner (born 1961), luger
- Jens Müller (born 1965), luger, lives in Ilmenau
- Claudia Nolte (born 1966), politician (CDU), 1994–1998 Federal Minister for family affairs, studied in Ilmenau
- Stefan Krauße (born 1967), luger
- Peter Sendel (born 1972), biathlete
- André Lange (born 1973), bobsledder
- Andrea Henkel (born 1977), biathlete, Olympic champion
- Dajana Eitberger (born 1991), luger, Olympic medalist
