= Ehrenberg (Ilmenau) =

Coordinates: 50.683°N 10.947°E

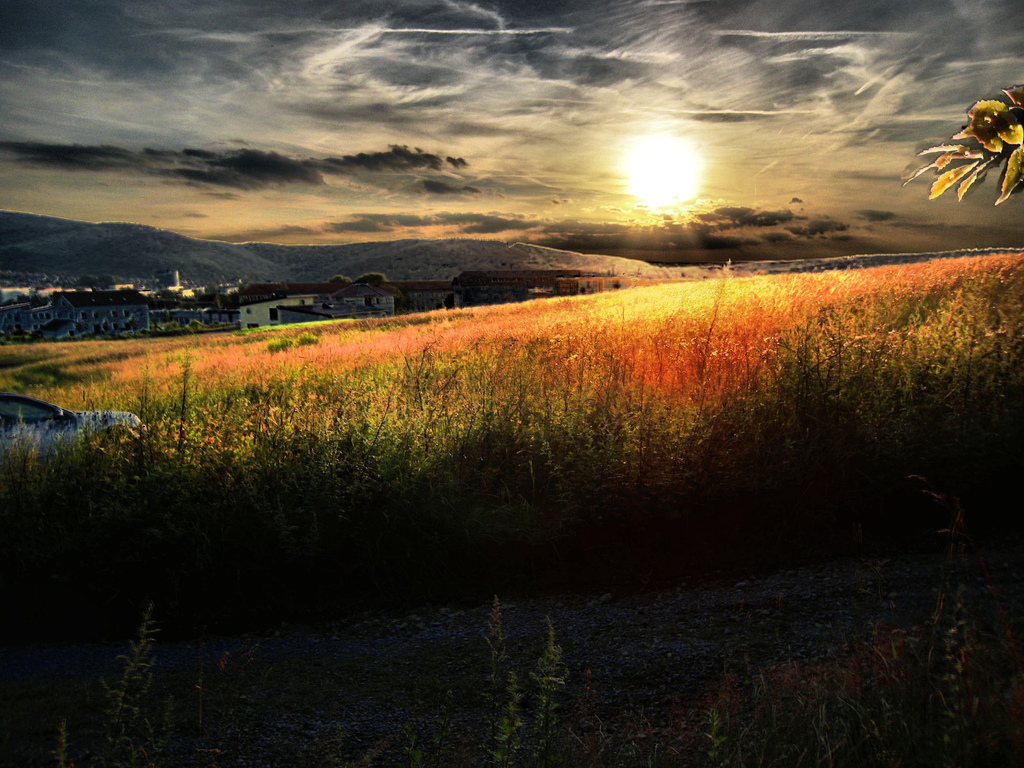
Summer sunset across the Ehrenberg in Ilmenau.

The Ehrenberg (German pronunciation: [ˈeːʁənbɛʁk]) is a hill to the east of Ilmenau, rising to a height of 528 metres and standing opposite the Tragberg. The border between Ilmenau and Langewiesen runs over its summit, which is marked by a large wooden cross. It is home to part of the campus of the Technische Universität Ilmenau (Technical University of Ilmenau) and the Bundesanstalt für Wasserbau (Federal Institute for Hydraulic Engineering). On 22 July 2006, around 6,000 square metres of the Ehrenberg were destroyed in a forest fire, although damage to buildings was limited. The body of the Ehrenberg itself is notable geologically for containing hydrobiotite, sometimes also called voigtite.
