= Oberes Geratal =

Municipal association in Thuringia, Germany

Coordinates: 50°39′N 11°00′E

Oberes Geratal is a former Verwaltungsgemeinschaft ("collective municipality") in the district Ilm-Kreis, in Thuringia, Germany. The seat of the Verwaltungsgemeinschaft was in Gräfenroda. It was disbanded in January 2019.

The Verwaltungsgemeinschaft Oberes Geratal consisted of the following municipalities:

1. Frankenhain
2. Gehlberg
3. Geschwenda
4. Gossel
5. Gräfenroda
6. Liebenstein
7. Plaue
