= Sieglitz (river) =

Location
- Country: Germany
- State: Thuringia

Physical characteristics
- Mouth
  - location: Wilde Gera
  - coordinates: 50.7218°N 10.7936°E

Basin features
- Progression: Wilde Gera→ Gera→ Unstrut→ Saale→ Elbe→ North Sea

The Sieglitz is a tributary of the Wilde Gera in the Thuringian Forest above Gräfenroda, approximately 4.5 kilometers long.

== Course ==
It rises about one kilometer east of Oberhof at Glashüttenplatz at an altitude of 710 meters. It then flows northeast to the Upper Sieglitz Pond. A little further downstream, it is crossed by the Lütsche-Flößgraben, which leads from here up to Oberhof and down to Frankenhain. Below the Lower Sieglitz Pond begins the Sieglitzgrund, where the Sieglitz is crossed by the Gerastollen. Part of its water flows through this tunnel to the northwest to the Ohra Dam. The rest follows the natural valley to the Sieglitzecke, where the stream flows into the Wilde Gera from the left.

== See also ==
- List of rivers of Thuringia
