= Johann Kellner =

Johann Kellner may refer to:

- Johann Christoph Kellner (1736–1803), German organist and composer
- Johann Peter Kellner (1705–1772), German organist and composer
