= Lütsche =

River in Germany

Location
- Country: Germany
- States: Thuringia

Physical characteristics
- Mouth
  - location: Wilde Gera
  - coordinates: 50.7408°N 10.8008°E

Basin features
- Progression: Wilde Gera→ Gera→ Unstrut→ Saale→ Elbe→ North Sea

Lütsche is a river of Thuringia, Germany, left tributary of the Wilde Gera. Its source is near Oberhof, in the Thuringian Forest. It flows into the reservoir Lütschetalsperre, which is also fed by its right tributary Oberster Wiesengrund. At the confluence with the left tributary Ensebach, the former village Lütsche-Dorf was situated. It was abandoned and demolished in the 19th century. The Lütsche flows into the Wilde Gera in Gräfenroda.

== See also ==
- List of rivers of Thuringia
