= Johann Christoph Kellner =

German organist and composer

Johann Christoph Kellner (15 August 1736 – 1803) was a German organist and composer. He was the son of Johann Peter Kellner.

== Life ==
He was born in Gräfenroda, Thuringia, Germany, where he studied music with his father, moving to Gotha to study with Georg Benda in 1754, returning home in 1755. He went on to live in Amsterdam and The Hague between 1762 and 1763, eventually settling in Kassel, Hesse, Germany, in 1764, where he was appointed court organist and cantor in the Lutheran church in 1772. He died there in 1803.

He wrote a treatise on music theory entitled Grundriss des Generalbasses (Principles of basso continuo), Op. 16, pt. 1 (Kassel, 1783, 1796), which was very successful. Most of his compositions are keyboard works in a similar galant style to his father's, with homophonic textures and clear song-like melodies. His concertos for harpsichord or piano anticipate the Viennese classical concerto, and share common features with his contemporary C. P. E. Bach. Many of his works were popular in their own time, as demonstrated by their inclusion in several 18th-century collections.

== Compositions ==
=== Concertos for piano or harpsichord ===
Published in Frankfurt:

- Op. 4: 1 concerto
- Op. 5: 3 concertos
- Op. 7: 3 concertos
- Op. 8: 3 concertos
- Op. 11: 1 concerto

Several more have been lost.

=== Organ and piano ===
- 3 Vor- oder vielmehr Nachspiele, 3 Fugen, 3 Choral-Vorspiele, im Trio mit dem Canto-firmo, Op. 14, pt. 1, for organ (Kassel)
- Orgel-Stücke von verschiedener Art, Op. 14, pt. 2, for organ (Kassel)
- Mein trautes Röschen, rondo for piano (Speyer, 1782)
- 31 neue Orgelstücke, Op. 17, pt. 1 (Speyer, 1789): 12 preludes, 14 chorale preludes, fantasia, fugue, quartet for 4 hands and pedals, 2 trio chorales for 2 keyboards and pedals
- Menuett, Fantasie, Fuge, Marche, Quartetto, for piano (Speyer, 1789)
- Sinfonia, for piano (Speyer, 1789)
- Neue Orgelstücke, Op. 17, pt. 2, for organ (Darmstadt, 1793)
- 14 Orgelstücke, bestehend in leichten Vor- und Nachspielen, zwischen neuen Choral-Vorspielen, Op. 20, pt. 1, for organ (Brunswick)
- Six fugues pour les Orgues ou le Clavecin, (Amsterdam, 1770)
- Serenade, for piano, 2 violins, flute, 2 horns, bass; 2 sonatas, for piano with violin; concerto, for piano with 2 violins, Op. 13 (Kassel)
- Sonata, for piano with violin and viola ad libitum, Op. 18 (Offenbach)

=== Vocal ===
Empfindsamkeit is apparent in his vocal writing. Some cantatas attributed to Johann Peter Kellner may have been composed by him.

- Die Schadenfreude, Op. 10: Singspiel, C. F. Weisse (Kassel, 1782)
- Herr Bachus ist ein braver Mann, song, G. A. Burger (Berlin, 1914)

== Sources ==
- Karl Gustav Fellerer: "Kellner, Johann Christoph", Grove Music Online ed. L. Macy (Accessed 13 June 2007)

== Free Scores ==
- Free scores by Johann Christoph Kellner at the International Music Score Library Project (IMSLP)
