= Wirrbachtalbrücke =

Arch bridge in Germany

Coordinates: 50.7367°N 10.8358°E

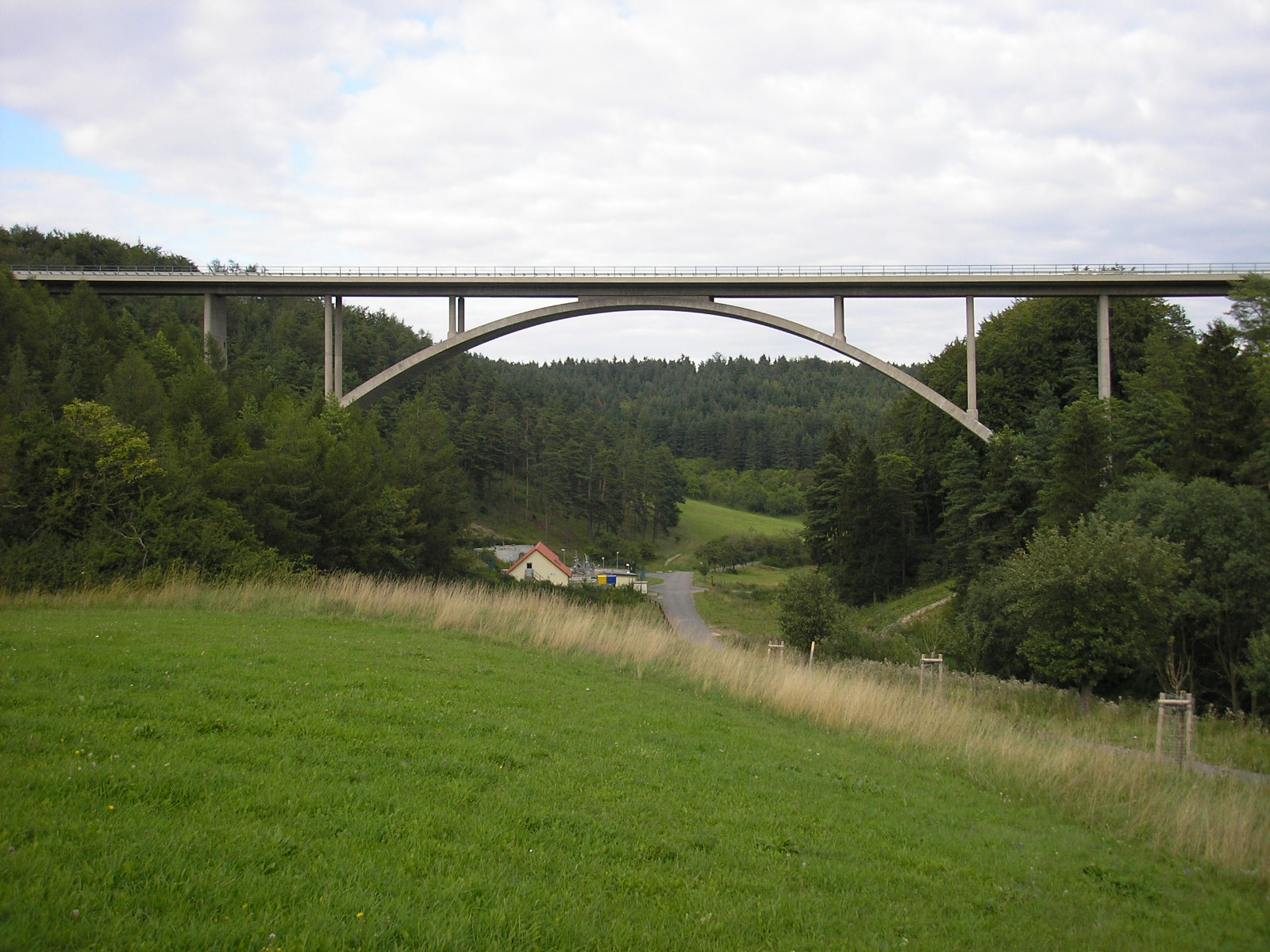
Wirrbachtalbrücke in August 2006

The Wirrbachtalbrücke is an arch bridge in Geschwenda, Thuringia, Germany. The bridge is located on the Bundesstraße 88 (Ohrdruf–Ilmenau), above the Wirrbach river of the Thuringian Forest. It is 235 metres (771 ft) long and 40 metres (130 ft) in height. The construction of the bridge began in 2001, and was completed in 2003.
