= Empfindsamkeit =

Empfindsamkeit is German for sensibility and may refer to:

- Sentimentalism (literature)
- Empfindsamkeit (music) (English: Sensitive style), or Empfindsamer Stil a composition style in 18th-century German music
