= Sieglitz =

Sieglitz may refer to:

- Sieglitz (river), of Thuringia, Germany
- Szczyglice, Lower Silesian Voivodeship (German name Sieglitz), a village in Lower Silesian Voivodeship, Poland
- Sieglitz, a district of the municipality Lommatzsch, Saxony, Germany
