= Geratal =

- Municipality
- Coat of arms

- Location of Geratal within Ilm-Kreis district
- Interactive map of Geratal
- Location within Germany Location within Thuringia
- Coordinates: 50°45′N 10°49′E
- Country: Germany
- State: Thuringia
- District: Ilm-Kreis
- Subdivisions: 6

Area
  - Total: 82.33 km^{2} (31.79 sq mi)
- Elevation: 490 m (1,610 ft)

Population (2025-12-31)
  - Total: 8,504
  - Density: 103.3/km^{2} (267.5/sq mi)
- Time zone: UTC+01:00 (CET)
  - Summer (DST): UTC+02:00 (CEST)
- Postal codes: 98716, 99330, 99338
- Dialling codes: 036205, 036207, 03677
- Vehicle registration: IK

Geratal (German pronunciation: [ˈɡeːʁaˌtaːl], lit. 'Gera Valley') is a municipality in the district Ilm-Kreis, in Thuringia, Germany. It was created with effect from 1 January 2019 by the merger of the former municipalities of Frankenhain, Geraberg, Geschwenda, Gossel, Gräfenroda and Liebenstein. The name refers to the river Gera.
