= Johann Peter Kellner =

German composer and organist (1705–1772)

Johann Peter Kellner (variants: Keller, Kelner; 28 September 1705 – 19 April 1772) was a German organist and composer. He was the father of Johann Christoph Kellner.

== Biography ==
He was born in Gräfenroda, Thuringia, and was intended by his parents to follow his father into a career as a lamp-black merchant. He was devoted to music from childhood, and first learnt singing from the cantor Johann Peter Nagel and keyboard from his son Johann Heinrich Nagel. He studied for a year from 1720 with the organist Johann Schmidt in Zella, followed by a year with the organist Hieronymus Florentinus Quehl (or Kehl) in Suhl, during which time he also studied composition. He knew Johann Sebastian Bach well, although it is not known whether he was taught by him. He was also acquainted with George Frideric Handel. In 1722, he returned to work as a tutor at Gräfenroda for three years. He was appointed cantor of Frankenhain in October 1725, returning to Gräfenroda in December 1727 as assistant cantor. He became cantor after Nagel's death in 1732, and remained in the post for the rest of his life; his pupils included Johann Philipp Kirnberger, Johannes Ringk, and J.E. Rembt. Kellner was admired as an organist, and performed for the Dukes of Coburg and Weimar and the Prince of Sondershausen.

He played an important role in the dissemination of music by Johann Sebastian Bach, through the many manuscript copies made by him and his circle, particularly of keyboard and organ works, and very importantly the six cello suites. These are the earliest or only source of many works, and provide information on their chronology, compositional history, and authenticity. Russell Stinson has determined that the three movement trio sonata for organ BWV 1039a/BWV 1027a was not made by Bach, but almost certainly a transcription made by Kellner of the first two movements of Bach's Sonata in G major for two flutes and continuo, BWV 1039, and the fourth movement of Bach's Sonata in G major for viola da gamba and harpsichord, BWV 1027.

== Compositions ==
His keyboard music is in typical galant style, though also shows influences of Bach's Well-Tempered Clavier.

Published in Arnstadt.

=== Organ ===
- Fugue in D minor, BWV Anh. 180
- Prelude and Fugue in D minor
- 2 trios, D major, G major, in Die Orgel II/7 (Lippstadt, 1958)
- Prelude in C major, in Orgelmusik um Johann Sebastian Bach (Wiesbaden, 1985)
- 2 fugues in C minor and D major
- 3 preludes in C major, C major, and G minor
- 2 preludes and fugues in G major
- It has been suggested that Kellner composed the Toccata and Fugue in D minor, formerly attributed to J.S. Bach

==== Chorale settings ====
- Herzlich tut mich verlangen, BWV Anh. 47 (Leipzig, 1907) on Herzlich tut mich verlangen
- Was Gott tut, das ist wohlgetan (Leipzig, 1907) on "Was Gott tut, das ist wohlgetan"
- Wer nur den lieben Gott lässt walten (Wiesbaden, 1985) on "Wer nur den lieben Gott lässt walten"
- Lobt Gott, ihr Christen, allzugleich
- Nun danket alle Gott, on "Nun danket alle Gott"
- Allein Gott in der Höh sei Ehr on "Allein Gott in der Höh sei Ehr"

=== Keyboard ===
- Certamen musicum, bestehend aus Präludien, Fugen, Allemanden, Couranten, Sarabanden, Giguen, wie *auch Menuetten, 6 suites (1739–1749)
- 3 Sonates (1752)
- Manipulus musices, oder Eine Hand voll kurzweiliger Zeitvertreib, 4 suites (1752–1756)
- Concerto in F major (Leipzig, 1956)
- 2 fugues in A minor and C major
- Menuet in A minor
- 3 preludes and fugues in A minor, C major, and G major
- 2 sonatas
- 12 Variationes

=== Vocal ===
- 36 church cantatas, in Stadt- und Universitätsbibliothek, Frankfurt
- Annual cycle of church cantatas with organ, 1753 (lost)

=== Recordings ===
Only a few works by Kellner have been recorded so far and often they appear in collections of organ music devoted to a school of composers. The following is a list of websites with information about recordings of music by Johann Peter Kellner:

- https://www.france-orgue.fr/disque/index.php?zpg=dsq.eng.rch&ior=c&oeu=J.%20P.%20KELLNER&com=Johann%20Peter%20KELLNER&zpaper=1
- http://www.allmusic.com/performance/trio-for-organ-in-g-major-arrangement-possibly-by-kellner-bwv-1027a-mq0000942751
- http://www.johann-peter-kellner.de/index.php?sub=musikliteratur&page=tontraeger
