= Gräfenroda =

- Ortsteil of Geratal
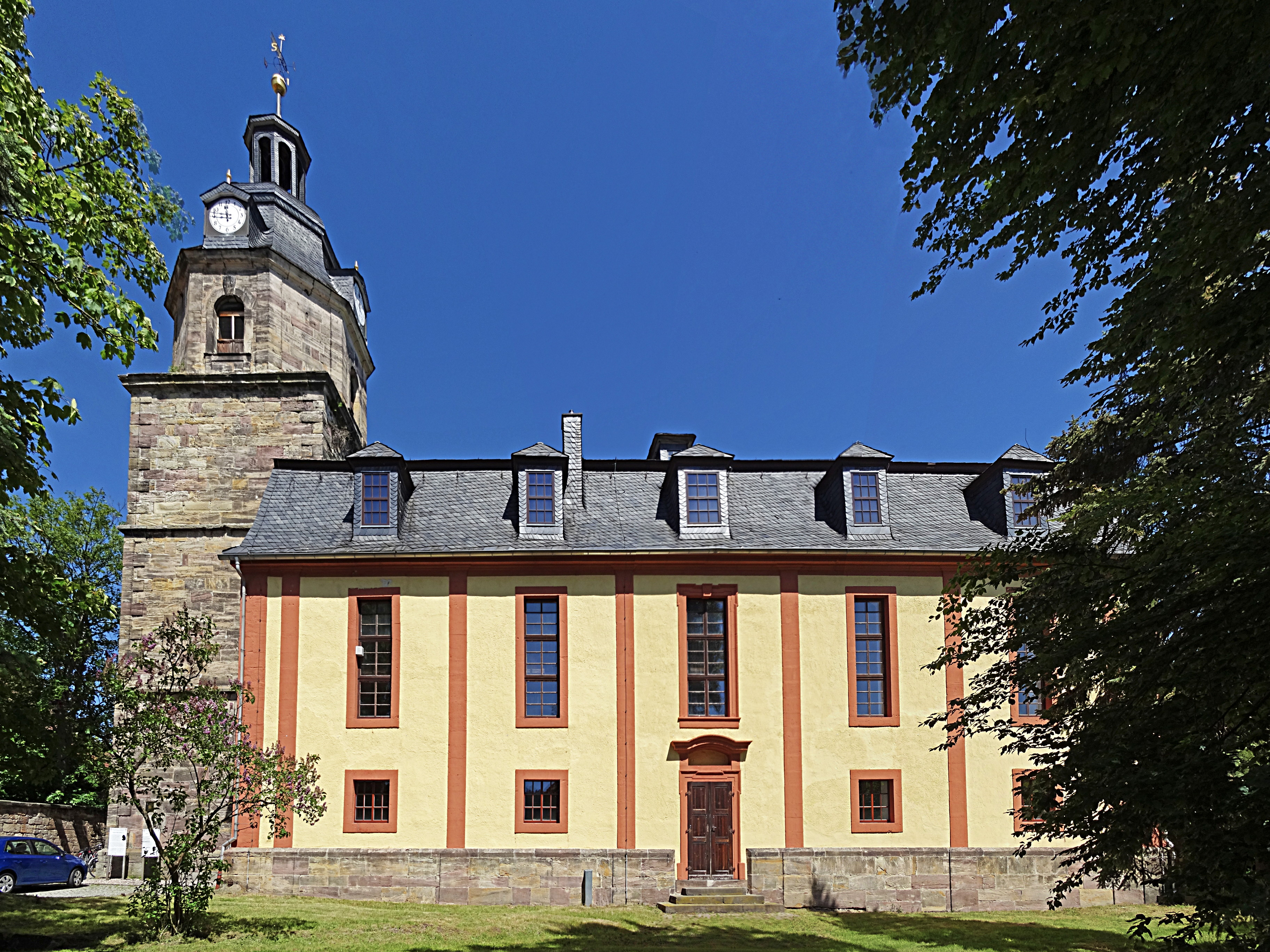
- St Lawrence Church

- Coat of arms
- Interactive map of Gräfenroda
- Location within Germany Location within Thuringia
- Coordinates: 50°44′56″N 10°48′44″E
- Country: Germany
- State: Thuringia
- District: Ilm-Kreis
- Municipality: Geratal

Area
  - Total: 23.31 km^{2} (9.00 sq mi)
- Elevation: 400 m (1,300 ft)

Population (2018-12-31)
  - Total: 3,180
  - Density: 136/km^{2} (353/sq mi)
- Time zone: UTC+01:00 (CET)
  - Summer (DST): UTC+02:00 (CEST)
- Postal codes: 99330
- Dialling codes: 036205
- Vehicle registration: IK
- Website: gemeinde-geratal.de

Gräfenroda (German pronunciation: [ɡʁɛːfn̩ˈʁoːda]) is a village and a former municipality in the Ilm-Kreis district, in Thuringia, Germany. Since 1 January 2019, it has been part of the municipality of Geratal. It was the administrative seat of the former Verwaltungsgemeinschaft Oberes Geratal.

== Geography ==
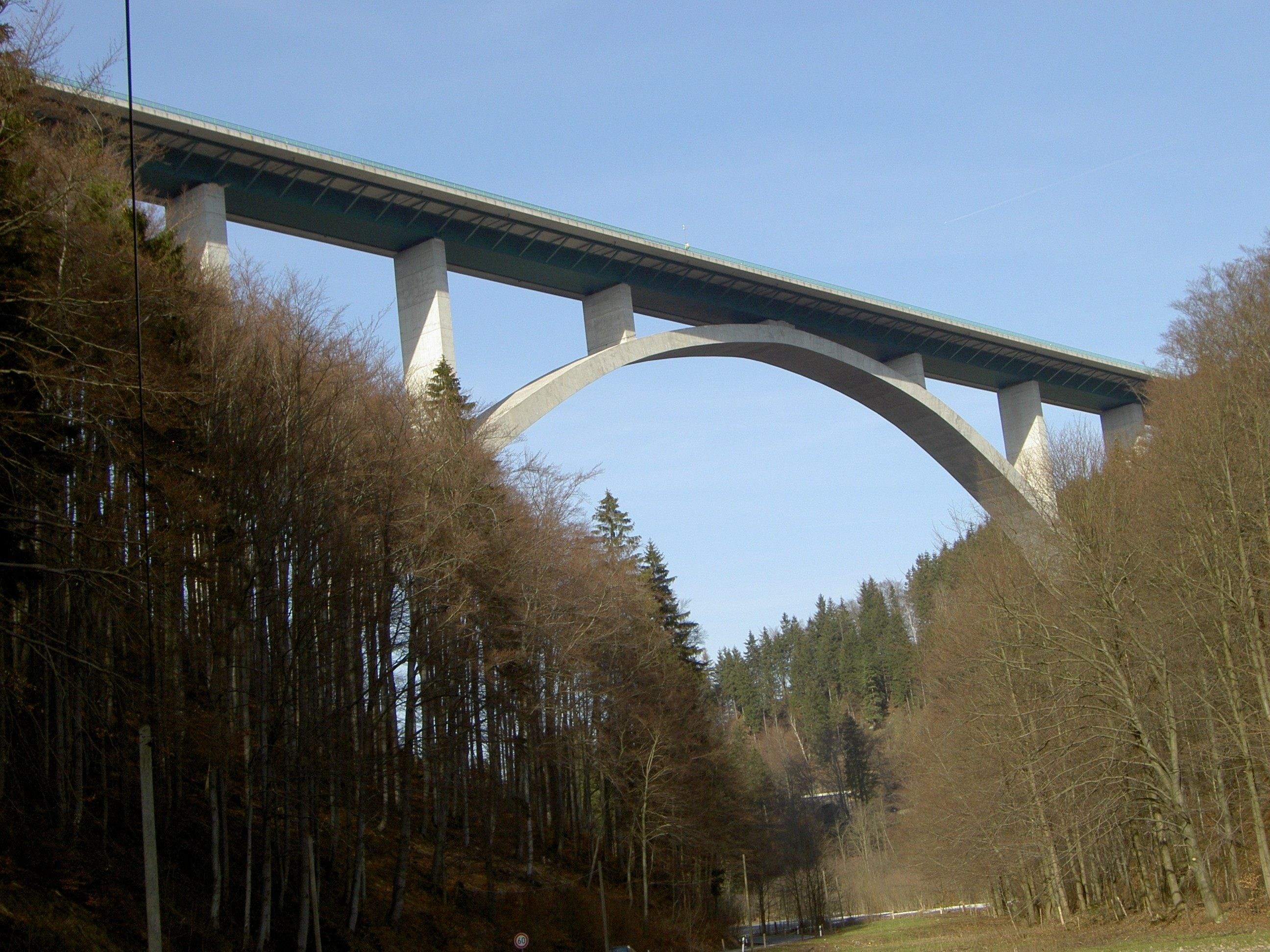
Wilde Gera bridge of the BAB 71

The municipal area stretches along the valley of the Wilde Gera river and its Lütsche tributary, northeast of the Thuringian Forest mountain range and the Rennsteig ridge. The Lütsche Reservoir built in 1935-38 is located west of the settlement. The municipality has access to the Bundesautobahn 71 near the Rennsteig Tunnel at Gräfenroda junction, about 3 km (1.9 mi) to the southeast.

With a population of about 3200, Gräfenroda is the district's fourth-largest municipality, though without town privileges.

== History ==
Gräfenroda was first mentioned in a 1290 deed, located on an important trade route from Arnstadt to Suhl. From the early 14th century onwards, the local estates were held by the Thuringian noble house of Schwarzburg. From 1640 half of the estates were in possession of the Ernestine dukes of Saxe-Gotha, while the remaining Schwarzenburg parts from 1716 were ruled within the principality of Schwarzburg-Sondershausen. The local population was largely involved in agriculture and forestry, but also in copper, silver and lead mining, as well as in glass production.

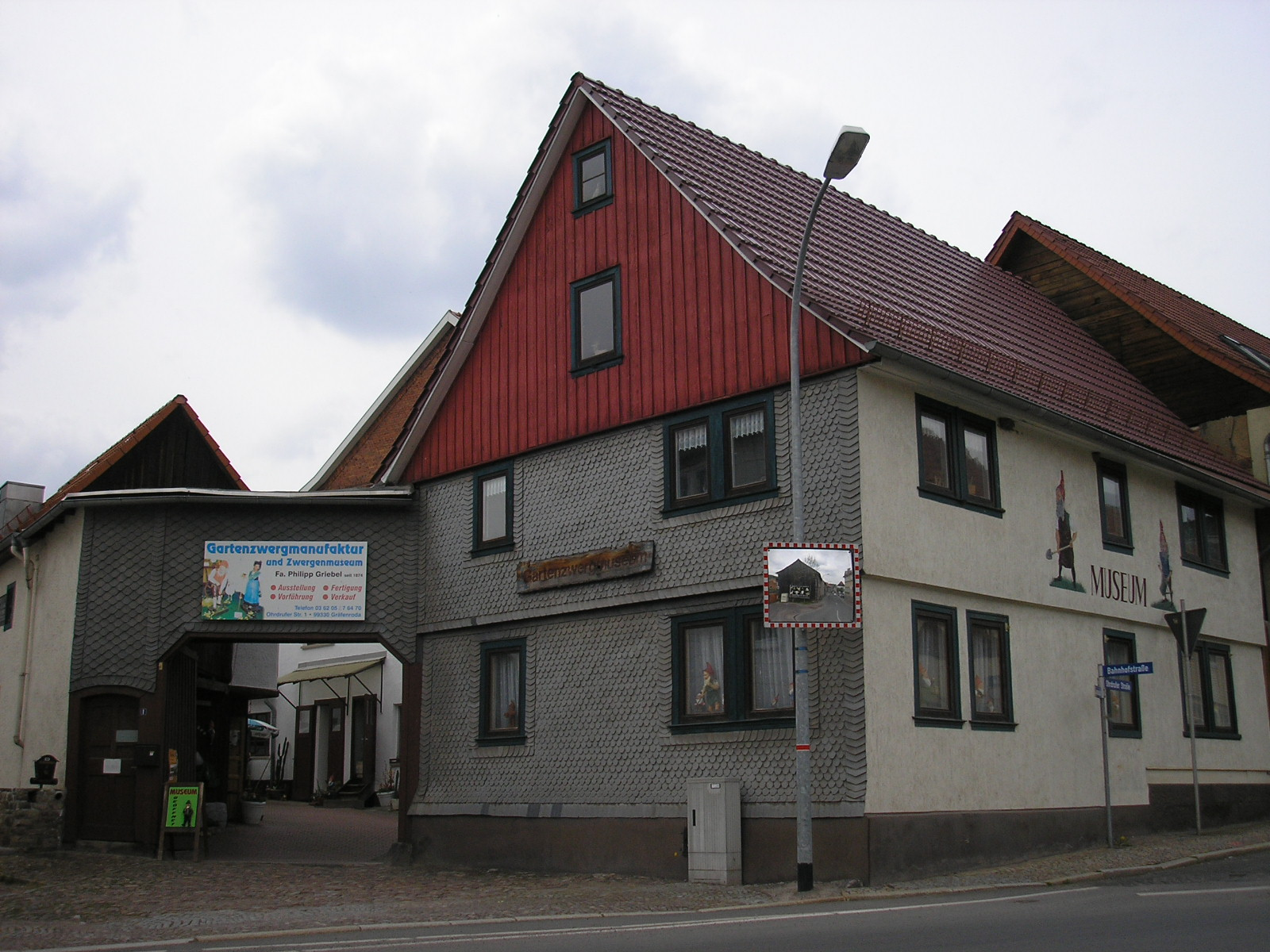
Gartenzwerg museum

While in the mid 19th century, numerous people emigrated from the remote area to the United States, the local economy developed in the course of the industrialisation. Gräfenroda station on the Neudietendorf–Ritschenhausen railway line was inaugurated by the Thuringian Railway Company in 1884, followed by a railway line to Gotha in 1892. In the 1870s, two local companies began the industrial production of garden gnomes (German: Gartenzwerge). After their first appearance at the 1898 Leipzig Trade Fair, these figurines became increasingly popular throughout Germany, with Gräfenroda as a centre of manufacturing. Today, a museum examines the history of garden gnomes.

From 1858 Gräfenroda was incorporated into the Ohrdruf district within the duchy of Saxe-Coburg and Gotha. It became part of the Free State of Thuringia in 1920.

== Politics ==
Seats in the municipal council (Gemeinderat) upon 2014 local elections:

- Christian Democratic Union of Germany (CDU): 7
- The Left: 4
- Social Democratic Party of Germany (SPD): 3
- Free Voters: 2

== Notable people ==
- Johann Peter Kellner (1705–1772), composer and organist
- Johann Christoph Kellner (1736–1803), composer and organist
- Hermann Brill (1895–1959), politician
