= Flutgraben =

Canal in Germany

- Interactive map of Flutgraben
- Location: Thuringia

Specifications
- Length: 5.4 miles (8.7 km)

History
- Construction began: 1890
- Date completed: 1898

Geography
- Start point: River Gera in Erfurt
- End point: River Gera in Erfurt; 50°59′18″N 11°1′18″E

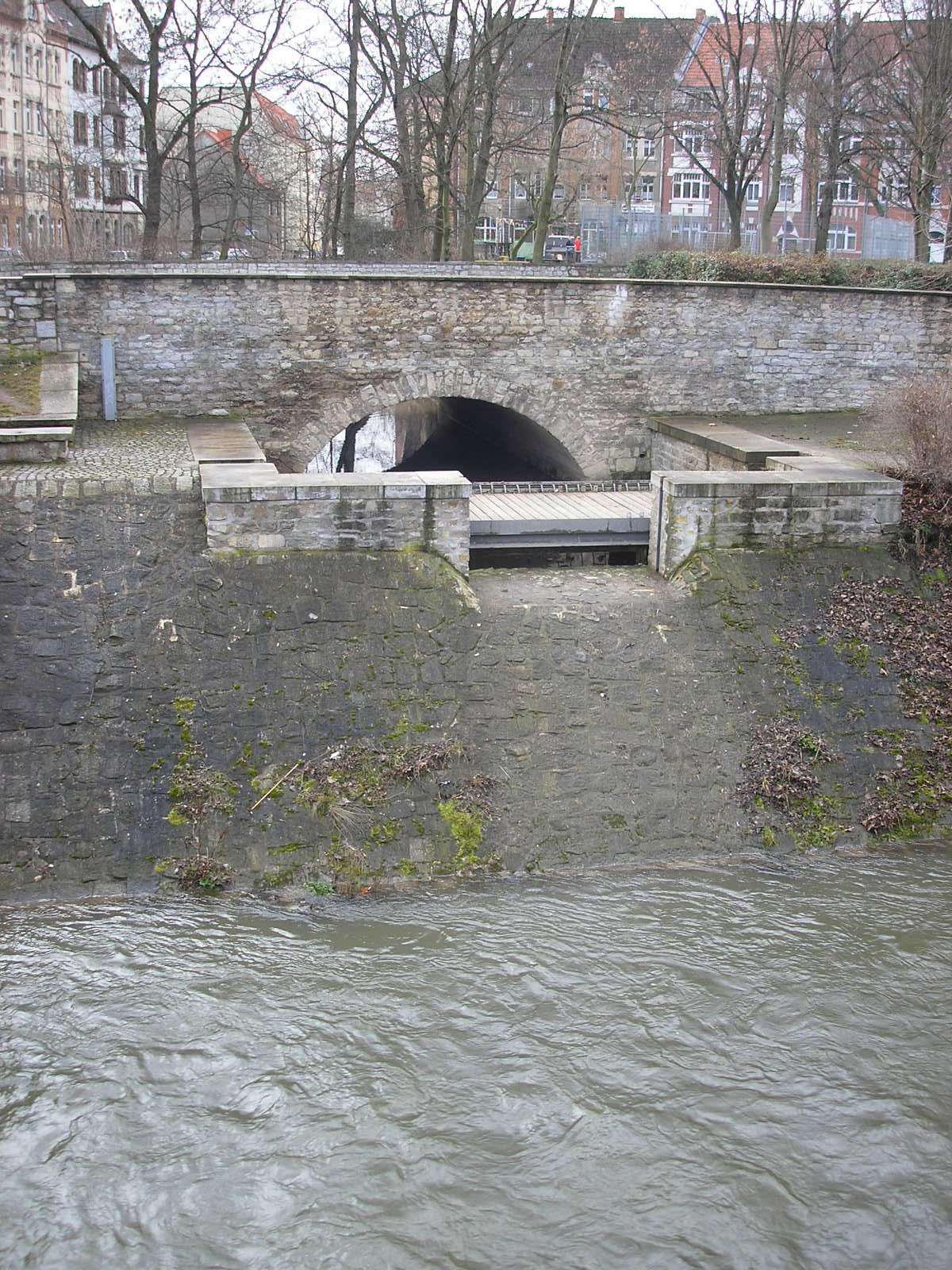
Flutgraben

The Flutgraben is a canal in Erfurt, Thuringia, Germany. It is a flood control channel, created between 1890 and 1898 in order to prevent flooding of the river Gera in the city centre of Erfurt.
