= Geraberg =

- Ortsteil of Geratal
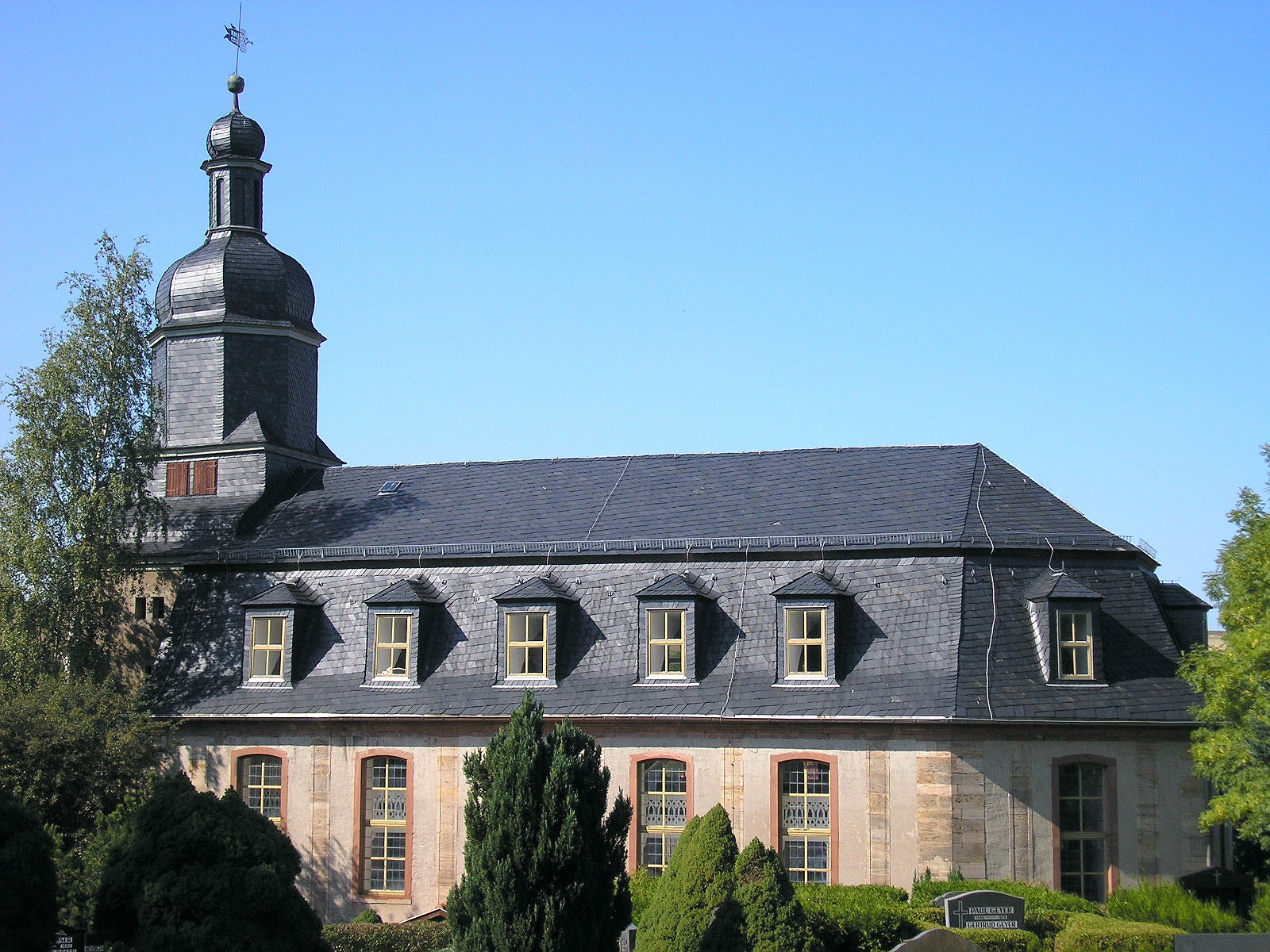
- Church in Geraberg

- Coat of arms
- Interactive map of Geraberg
- Location within Germany Location within Thuringia
- Coordinates: 50°43′5″N 10°50′45″E
- Country: Germany
- State: Thuringia
- District: Ilm-Kreis
- Municipality: Geratal

Area
  - Total: 15.05 km^{2} (5.81 sq mi)
- Elevation: 440 m (1,440 ft)

Population (2017-12-31)
  - Total: 2,312
  - Density: 153.6/km^{2} (397.9/sq mi)
- Time zone: UTC+01:00 (CET)
  - Summer (DST): UTC+02:00 (CEST)
- Postal codes: 99331
- Dialling codes: 03677
- Vehicle registration: IK, IL, ARN
- Website: www.geraberg.de

Geraberg (German pronunciation: [ˈɡeːʁabɛʁk]) is a village and a former municipality located at the northern edge of the Thuringian Forest in the district Ilm-Kreis, in Thuringia, Germany. Since 1 January 2019, it is part of the municipality Geratal.
