= Bruno Bartholome =

German long-distance runner (1927–1994)

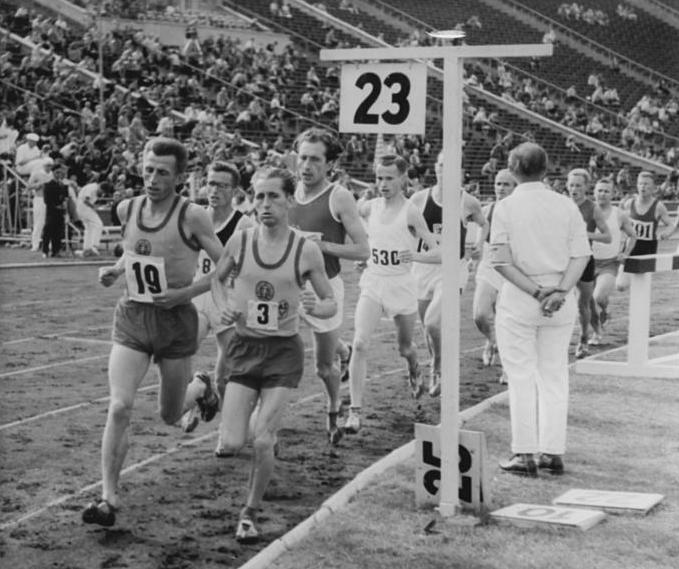

Personal information
- Nationality: German
- Born: 23 August 1927 Geschwenda, Germany
- Died: 7 July 1994 (aged 66) Suhl, Germany

Sport
- Sport: Long-distance running
- Event: Marathon

Bruno Bartholome (23 August 1927 – 7 July 1994) was a German long-distance runner. He competed in the marathon at the 1960 Summer Olympics.
