= Hieronymus Florentinus Quehl =

Hieronymus Florentinus Quehl (May 11, 1694 – March 27, 1739) was a German composer and organist.

== Life and career ==
Quehl was born in Zella, Holy Roman Empire, the son of a parish clerk. He was a gifted musician who by the age of ten was performing in Northern European cities, including Hamburg, Amsterdam, Leyden and The Hague. His primary organ teacher at the time was Kapellmeister Christian Friedrich Witt of Gotha. In 1714 Quehl assumed the position of organist at St. Marien Cathedral in Suhl. Four years later, he married into the family of St. Marien's head pastor. His marriage produced eight children, six of whom did not survive infancy. Johann Sebastian Bach, then the Kapellmeister at the Court in Köthen, was godfather to Quehl’s third son. In 1730, Quehl was appointed organist and cantor at St. Nicolai in Marktbreit am Main.

From 1732 to 1733, he taught organ and composition to Johann Peter Kellner, who later wrote: "[Quehl's] skill and other musical abilities inspired me to give it a try. The man promised to teach me and it was here my foundations of composition were made."

Quehl was an organist in Nurnberg in 1734. In 1735, he joined the church school service as a cantor, organist and Music Director at St. Michael in Fürth, where he remained until the end of his life.

Quehl died in Fürth on 27 March 1739.

== Compositions ==
Most of Quehl's music has yet to be discovered, and only a few manuscripts exist today. One work that has been attributed to Quehl is a tablature with 205 chorale fugues that had been stored in the Royal Library in Berlin until it was moved to avoid destruction during World War II. The manuscript is now at the Jagiellonian University library in Kraków.

On 17 December 1730 a cantata by Quehl was performed in Marktbreit am Main. The composition was based on Psalm 84:2-4.

In 1734 Quahl completed a manuscript titled, "Der zur Beförderung Göttlicher Ehre und Aufmunterung des Geistlichen Zions abzielende Erstere Musicalische Versuch. Bestehend aus Zweyen Chorälen. Mit unterschiedenen, teils Figurirten, teils auf zwei Clavieren und obligaten Pedal, auf drei Linien eingerichteten Variationen." ("The First Musical Attempt to Promote Divine Honor and Encouragement of Spiritual Zion. For two choirs. With variations arranged on three lines, figured bass, two harpsichords and obbligato pedal"). A second, undiscovered work is mentioned in a note related to that piece.
