= Classical period (music) =

Era of classical music (c. 1730–1820)

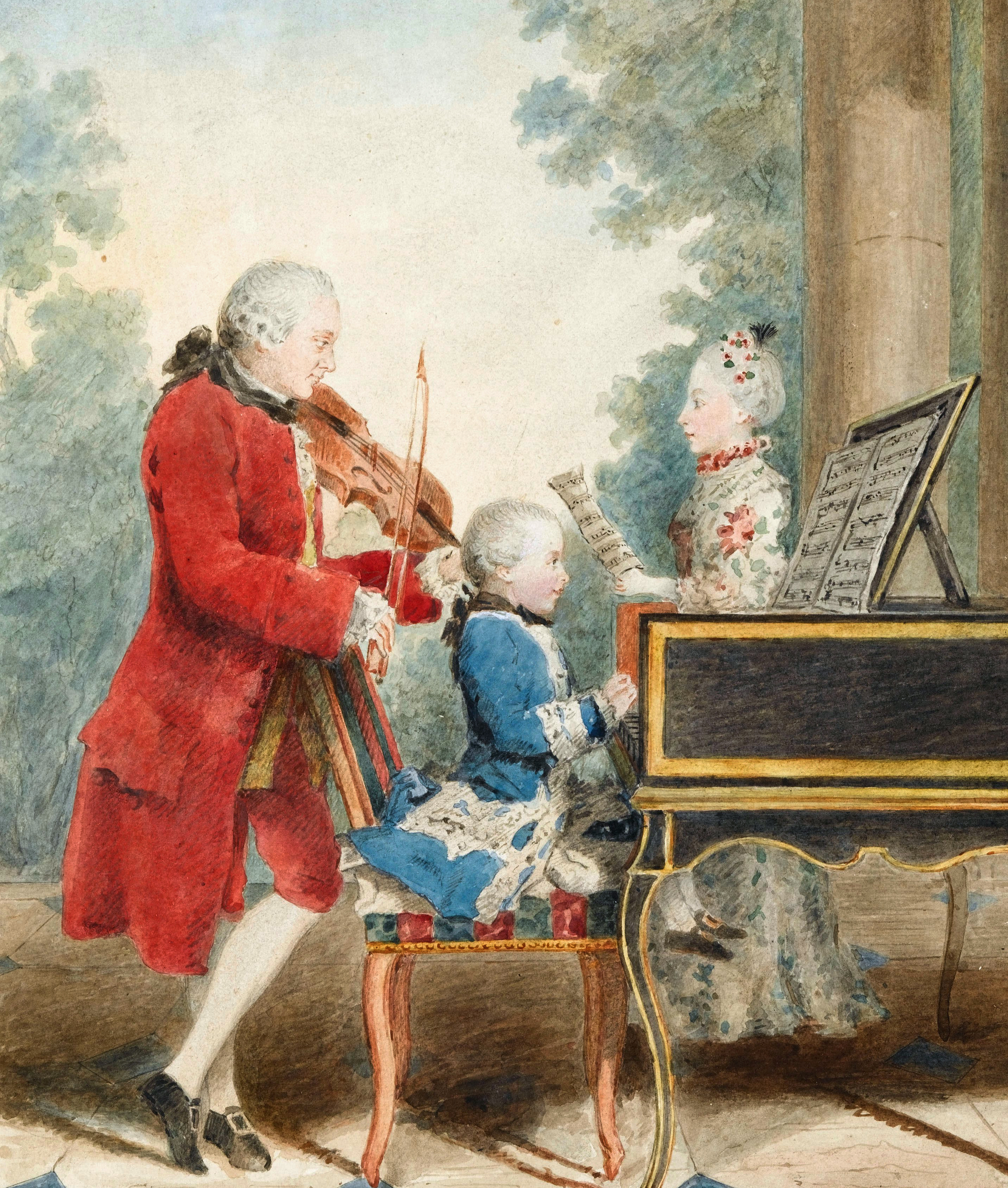
Wolfgang Amadeus Mozart, a representative composer of the Classical period, seated at a keyboard

The Classical period was an era of classical music between roughly 1750 and 1820.

The classical period falls between the Baroque and Romantic periods. It is mainly homophonic, using a clear melody line over a subordinate chordal accompaniment, but counterpoint was by no means forgotten, especially in liturgical vocal music and, later in the period, secular instrumental music. It also makes use of style galant which emphasizes light elegance in place of the Baroque's dignified seriousness and impressive grandeur. Variety and contrast within a piece became more pronounced than before, and the orchestra increased in size, range, and power.

The harpsichord declined as the main keyboard instrument and was superseded by the piano (or fortepiano). Unlike the harpsichord, which plucks strings with quills, pianos strike the strings with leather-covered hammers when the keys are pressed, which enables the performer to play louder or softer (hence the original name "fortepiano", literally "loud soft") and play with more expression; in contrast, the force with which a performer plays the harpsichord keys does not change the sound. Instrumental music was considered important by Classical period composers. The main kinds of instrumental music were the sonata, trio, string quartet, quintet, symphony (performed by an orchestra), and the solo concerto, which featured a virtuoso solo performer playing a solo work for violin, piano, flute, or another instrument, accompanied by an orchestra. Vocal music, such as songs for a singer and piano (notably the work of Schubert), choral works, and opera (a staged dramatic work for singers and orchestra), was also important during this period.

The period is sometimes referred to as the era of Viennese Classicism (German: Wiener Klassik), since Christoph Willibald Gluck, Georg Christoph Wagenseil, Georg Matthias Monn, Joseph Haydn, Johann Georg Albrechtsberger, Carl Ditters von Dittersdorf, Johann Baptist Wanhal, Antonio Salieri, Wolfgang Amadeus Mozart, Ludwig van Beethoven, and Franz Schubert all worked in Vienna.

== Classicism ==
In the middle of the 18th century, Europe began to move toward a new style in architecture, literature, and the arts, generally known as Neoclassicism. This style sought to emulate the ideals of Classical antiquity, especially those of Classical Greece. Classical music used formality and emphasis on order and hierarchy and a "clearer", "cleaner" style that used divisions between parts (notably a clear, single melody accompanied by chords), brighter contrasts, and "timbre" (achieved by the use of dynamic changes and modulations to more keys). In contrast with the richly layered music of the Baroque era, Classical music moved towards simplicity rather than complexity. In addition, the typical size of orchestras began to increase, giving orchestras a more powerful sound.

The remarkable development of ideas in "natural philosophy" had already established itself in the public consciousness. In particular, Newton's physics was taken as a paradigm: structures should be well-founded in axioms and be both well-articulated and orderly. This taste for structural clarity began to affect music, which moved away from the layered polyphony of the Baroque period toward a style known as homophony, in which the melody is played over a subordinate harmony. This move meant that chords became a much more prevalent feature of music, even if they interrupted the melodic smoothness of a single part. As a result, the tonal structure of a piece of music became more audible.

The new style was also encouraged by changes in the economic order and social structure. As the 18th century progressed, the nobility became the primary patrons of instrumental music, while public taste increasingly preferred lighter, funny comic operas. This led to changes in the way music was performed, the most crucial of which was the move to standard instrumental groups and the reduction in the importance of the continuo—the rhythmic and harmonic groundwork of a piece of music, typically played by a keyboard (harpsichord or organ) and usually accompanied by a varied group of bass instruments, including cello, double bass, bass viol, and theorbo. One way to trace the decline of the continuo and its figured chords is to examine the disappearance of the term obbligato, meaning a mandatory instrumental part in a work of chamber music. In Baroque compositions, additional instruments could be added to the continuo group according to the group or leader's preference; in Classical compositions, all parts were specifically noted, though not always notated, so the term "obbligato" became redundant. By 1800, basso continuo was practically extinct, except for the occasional use of a pipe organ continuo part in a religious Mass in the early 1800s.

Economic changes also had the effect of altering the balance of availability and quality of musicians. While in the late Baroque, a major composer would have the entire musical resources of a town to draw on, the musical forces available at an aristocratic hunting lodge or small court were smaller and more fixed in their level of ability. This was a spur to having simpler parts for ensemble musicians to play, and in the case of a resident virtuoso group, a spur to writing spectacular, idiomatic parts for certain instruments, as in the case of the Mannheim orchestra, or virtuoso solo parts for particularly skilled violinists or flutists. In addition, the appetite by audiences for a continual supply of new music carried over from the Baroque. This meant that works had to be performable with, at best, one or two rehearsals. Even after 1790, Mozart writes about "the rehearsal", with the implication that his concerts would have only one rehearsal.

Since there was a greater emphasis on a single melodic line, there was greater emphasis on notating that line for dynamics and phrasing. This contrasts with the Baroque era, when melodies were typically written with no dynamics, phrasing marks, ornaments, as it was assumed that the performer would improvise these elements on the spot. In the Classical era, it became more common for composers to indicate where they wanted performers to play ornaments such as trills or turns. The simplification of texture made such instrumental detail more important, and it also made the use of characteristic rhythms, such as attention-getting opening fanfares, the funeral march rhythm, or the minuet genre, more important in establishing and unifying the tone of a single movement.

The Classical period also saw the gradual development of sonata form, a set of structural principles for music that reconciled the Classical preference for melodic material with harmonic development, which could be applied across musical genres. The sonata itself continued to be the principal form for solo and chamber music, while later in the Classical period, the string quartet became a prominent genre. The symphony form for orchestra was created in this period (this is popularly attributed to Joseph Haydn). The concerto grosso (a concerto for more than one musician), a very popular form in the Baroque era, began to be replaced by the solo concerto, featuring only one soloist. Composers began to place more importance on the particular soloist's ability to show off virtuoso skills, with challenging, fast scale and arpeggio runs. Nonetheless, some concerti grossi remained, the most famous of which was Mozart's Sinfonia Concertante for Violin and Viola in E-flat major.

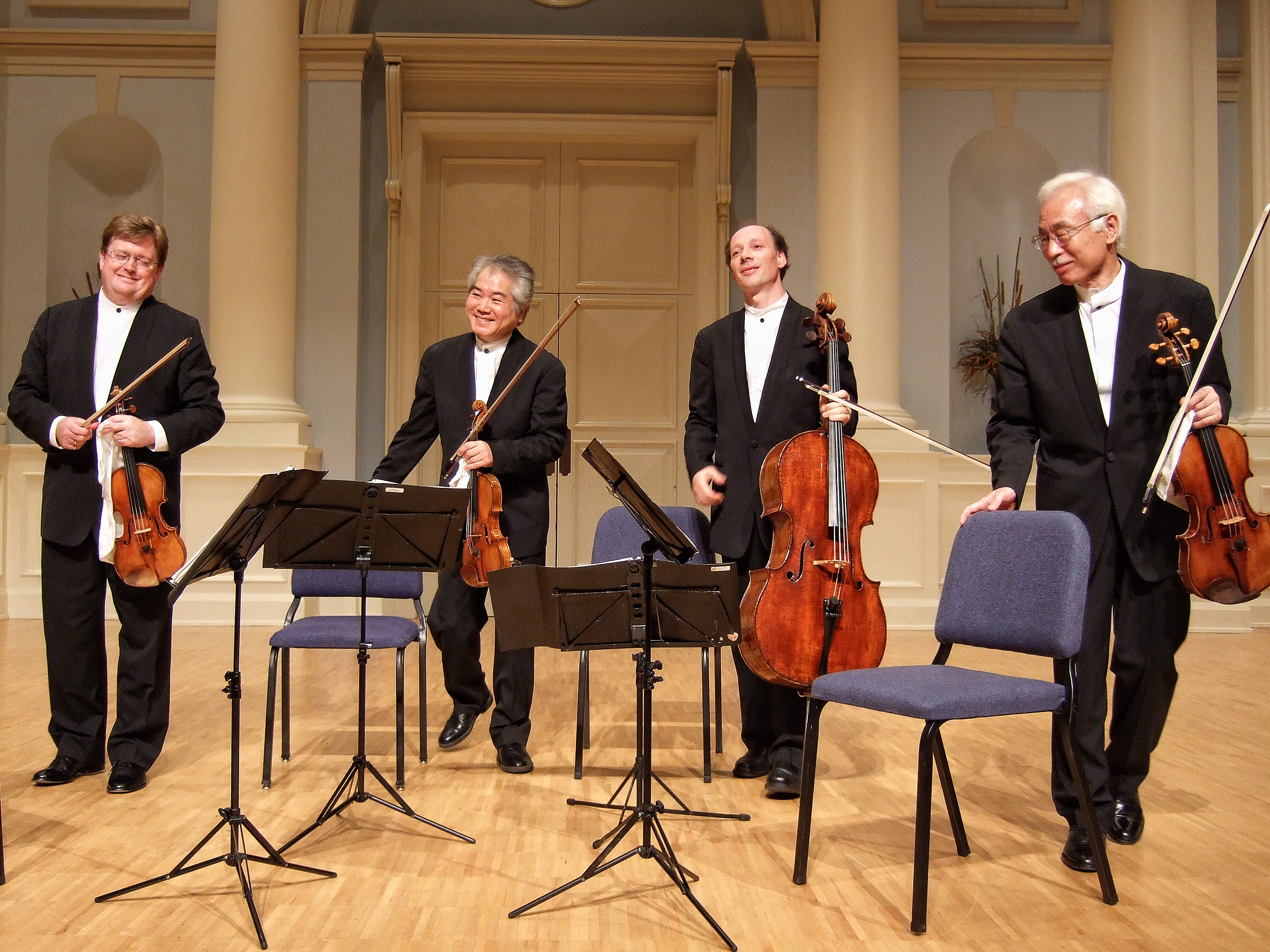
A modern string quartet. In the 2000s, string quartets from the Classical era are the core of the chamber music literature. From left to right: violin 1, violin 2, cello, viola.

== Main characteristics ==
In the classical period, the theme consists of phrases with contrasting melodic figures and rhythms. These phrases are relatively brief, typically four bars in length, and can occasionally seem sparse or terse. The texture is mainly homophonic, with a clear melody above a subordinate chordal accompaniment, for instance an Alberti bass. This contrasts with the practice in Baroque music, where a piece or movement would typically have only one musical subject, which would then be worked out in a number of voices according to the principles of counterpoint, while maintaining a consistent rhythm or metre throughout. As a result, Classical music tends to have a lighter, clearer texture than the Baroque. The classical style draws on the style galant, a musical style which emphasized light elegance in place of the Baroque's dignified seriousness and impressive grandeur.

Structurally, Classical music generally has a clear musical form, with a well-defined contrast between tonic and dominant, introduced by clear cadences. Dynamics are used to highlight the structural characteristics of the piece. In particular, sonata form and its variants were developed during the early classical period and was frequently used. The Classical approach to structure again contrasts with the Baroque, where a composition would normally move between tonic and dominant and back again, but through a continual progress of chord changes and without a sense of "arrival" at the new key. While counterpoint was less emphasised in the classical period, it was by no means forgotten, especially later in the period, and composers still used counterpoint in "serious" works such as symphonies and string quartets, as well as religious pieces, such as Masses.

The classical musical style was supported by technical developments in instruments. The widespread adoption of equal temperament made classical musical structure possible, by ensuring that cadences in all keys sounded similar. The fortepiano and then the pianoforte replaced the harpsichord, enabling more dynamic contrast and more sustained melodies. Over the Classical period, keyboard instruments became richer, more sonorous and more powerful.

The orchestra increased in size and range, and became more standardised. The harpsichord or pipe organ basso continuo role in orchestra fell out of use between 1750 and 1775, leaving the string section. Woodwinds became a self-contained section, consisting of clarinets, oboes, flutes and bassoons.

While vocal music such as comic opera was popular, great importance was given to instrumental music. The main kinds of instrumental music were the sonata, trio, string quartet, quintet, symphony, concerto (usually for a virtuoso solo instrument accompanied by orchestra), and light pieces such as serenades and divertimentos. Sonata form developed and became the most important form. It was used to build up the first movement of most large-scale works in symphonies and string quartets. Sonata form was also used in other movements and in single, standalone pieces such as overtures.

== History ==
=== Baroque/Classical transition c. 1750–1760 ===
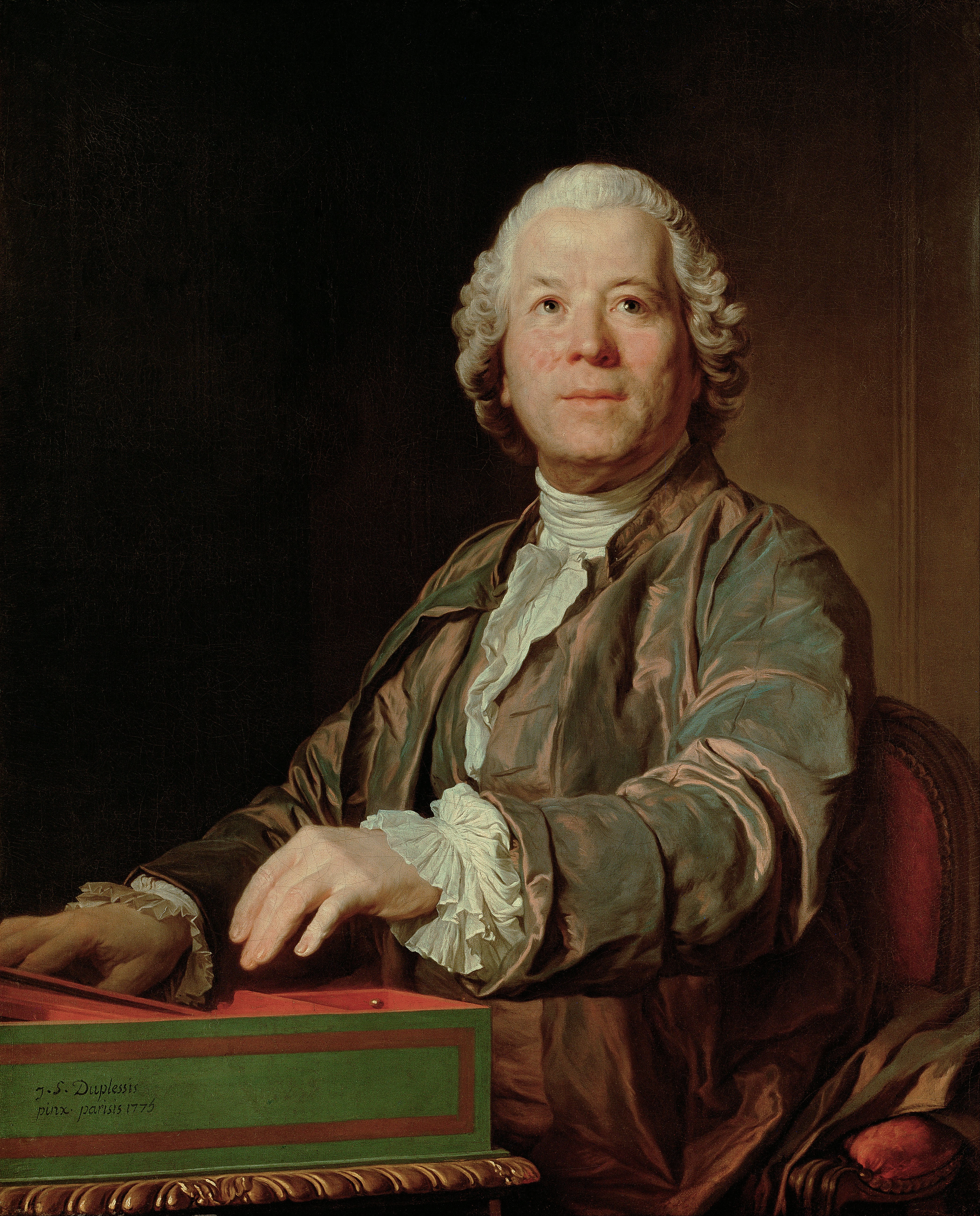
Gluck, detail of Portrait of Christoph Willibald Gluck by Joseph Duplessis, dated 1775 (Kunsthistorisches Museum, Vienna)

In his book The Classical Style, author and pianist Charles Rosen claims that from 1755 to 1775, composers groped for a new style that was more effectively dramatic. In the High Baroque period, dramatic expression was limited to the representation of individual affects (the "doctrine of affections", or what Rosen terms "dramatic sentiment"). For example, in Handel's oratorio Jephtha, the composer renders four emotions separately, one for each character, in the quartet "O, spare your daughter". Eventually this depiction of individual emotions came to be seen as simplistic and unrealistic; composers sought to portray multiple emotions, simultaneously or progressively, within a single character or movement ("dramatic action"). Thus in the finale of act 2 of Mozart's Die Entführung aus dem Serail, the lovers move "from joy through suspicion and outrage to final reconciliation."

Musically speaking, this "dramatic action" required more musical variety. Whereas Baroque music was characterized by seamless flow within individual movements and largely uniform textures, composers after the High Baroque sought to interrupt this flow with abrupt changes in texture, dynamic, harmony, or tempo. Among the stylistic developments which followed the High Baroque, the most dramatic came to be called Empfindsamkeit, (roughly "sensitive style"), and its best-known practitioner was Carl Philipp Emanuel Bach. Composers of this style employed the above-discussed interruptions in the most abrupt manner, and the music can sound illogical at times. The Italian composer Domenico Scarlatti took these developments further. His more than five hundred single-movement keyboard sonatas also contain abrupt changes of texture, but these changes are organized into periods, balanced phrases that became a hallmark of the classical style. However, Scarlatti's changes in texture still sound sudden and unprepared. The outstanding achievement of the great classical composers (Haydn, Mozart and Beethoven) was their ability to make these dramatic surprises sound logically motivated, so that "the expressive and the elegant could join hands."

Between the death of J. S. Bach and the maturity of Haydn and Mozart (roughly 1750–1770), composers experimented with these new ideas, which can be seen in the music of Bach's sons. Johann Christian developed a style which we now call Roccoco, comprising simpler textures and harmonies, and which was "charming, undramatic, and a little empty." As mentioned previously, Carl Philipp Emmanuel sought to increase drama, and his music was "violent, expressive, brilliant, continuously surprising, and often incoherent." And finally Wilhelm Friedemann, J.S. Bach's eldest son, extended Baroque traditions in an idiomatic, unconventional way.

At first the new style took over Baroque forms—the ternary da capo aria, the sinfonia and the concerto—but composed with simpler parts, more notated ornamentation, rather than the improvised ornaments that were common in the Baroque era, and more emphatic division of pieces into sections. However, over time, the new aesthetic caused radical changes in how pieces were put together, and the basic formal layouts changed. Composers from this period sought dramatic effects, striking melodies, and clearer textures. One of the big textural changes was a shift away from the complex, dense polyphonic style of the Baroque, in which multiple interweaving melodic lines were played simultaneously, and towards homophony, a lighter texture which uses a clear single melody line accompanied by chords.

Baroque music generally uses many harmonic fantasies and polyphonic sections that focus less on the structure of the musical piece, and there was less emphasis on clear musical phrases. In the classical period, the harmonies became simpler. However, the structure of the piece, the phrases and small melodic or rhythmic motives, became much more important than in the Baroque period.

Muzio Clementi's Sonata in G minor, No. 3, Op. 50, "Didone abbandonata", adagio movement

Another important break with the past was the radical overhaul of opera by Christoph Willibald Gluck, who cut away a great deal of the layering and improvisational ornaments and focused on the points of modulation and transition. By making these moments where the harmony changes more of a focus, he enabled powerful dramatic shifts in the emotional color of the music. To highlight these transitions, he used changes in instrumentation (orchestration), melody, and mode. Among the most successful composers of his time, Gluck spawned many emulators, including Antonio Salieri. Their emphasis on accessibility brought huge successes in opera, and in other vocal music such as songs, oratorios, and choruses. These were considered the most important kinds of music for performance and hence enjoyed greatest public success.

The phase between the Baroque and the rise of the Classical (around 1730), was home to various competing musical styles. The diversity of artistic paths are represented in the sons of Johann Sebastian Bach: Wilhelm Friedemann Bach, who continued the Baroque tradition in a personal way; Johann Christian Bach, who simplified textures of the Baroque and most clearly influenced Mozart; and Carl Philipp Emanuel Bach, who composed passionate and sometimes violently eccentric music of the Empfindsamkeit movement. Musical culture was caught at a crossroads: the masters of the older style had the technique, but the public hungered for the new. This is one of the reasons C. P. E. Bach was held in such high regard: he understood the older forms quite well and knew how to present them in new garb, with an enhanced variety of form.

=== 1760–1775 ===
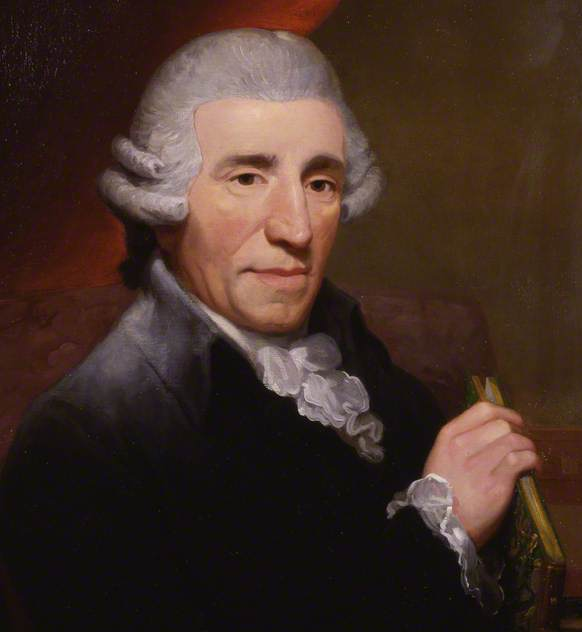
Haydn portrait by Thomas Hardy, 1792

By the late 1750s there were flourishing centers of the new style in Italy, Vienna, Mannheim, and Paris; dozens of symphonies were composed and there were bands of players associated with musical theatres. Opera or other vocal music accompanied by orchestra was the feature of most musical events, with concertos and symphonies (arising from the overture) serving as instrumental interludes and introductions for operas and church services. Over the course of the Classical period, symphonies and concertos developed and were presented independently of vocal music.

Mozart wrote a number of divertimentos, light instrumental pieces designed for entertainment. This is the 2nd movement of his Divertimento in E-flat major, K. 113.

The "normal" orchestra ensemble—a body of strings supplemented by winds—and movements of particular rhythmic character were established by the late 1750s in Vienna. However, the length and weight of pieces was still set with some Baroque characteristics: individual movements still focused on one "affect" (musical mood) or had only one sharply contrasting middle section, and their length was not significantly greater than Baroque movements. There was not yet a clearly enunciated theory of how to compose in the new style. It was a moment ripe for a breakthrough.

The first great master of the style was the composer Joseph Haydn. In the late 1750s he began composing symphonies, and by 1761 he had composed a triptych (Morning, Noon, and Evening) solidly in the contemporary mode. As a vice-Kapellmeister and later Kapellmeister, his output expanded: he composed over forty symphonies in the 1760s alone. And while his fame grew, as his orchestra was expanded and his compositions were copied and disseminated, his voice was only one among many.

While some scholars suggest that Haydn was later overshadowed by Mozart and Beethoven, it would be difficult to overstate Haydn's centrality to the new style, and therefore to the future of Western art music as a whole. At the time, before the pre-eminence of Mozart or Beethoven, and with Johann Sebastian Bach known primarily to connoisseurs of keyboard music, Haydn reached a place in music that set him above all other composers except perhaps the Baroque era's George Frideric Handel. Haydn took existing ideas, and radically altered how they functioned—earning him the titles "father of the symphony" and "father of the string quartet".

One of the forces that worked as an impetus for his pressing forward was the first stirring of what would later be called Romanticism—the Sturm und Drang, or "storm and stress" phase in the arts, a short period where obvious and dramatic emotionalism was a stylistic preference. Haydn accordingly wanted more dramatic contrast and more emotionally appealing melodies, with sharpened character and individuality in his pieces. This period faded away in music and literature: however, it influenced what came afterward and would eventually be a component of aesthetic taste in later decades.

The Farewell Symphony, No. 45 in F♯ minor, exemplifies Haydn's integration of the differing demands of the new style, with surprising sharp turns and a long slow adagio to end the work. In 1772, Haydn completed his Opus 20 set of six string quartets, in which he deployed the polyphonic techniques he had gathered from the previous Baroque era to provide structural coherence capable of holding together his melodic ideas. For some, this marks the beginning of the "mature" Classical style, a transitional period in which reaction against late Baroque complexity yielded to integration of Baroque and Classical elements.

=== 1775–1790 ===
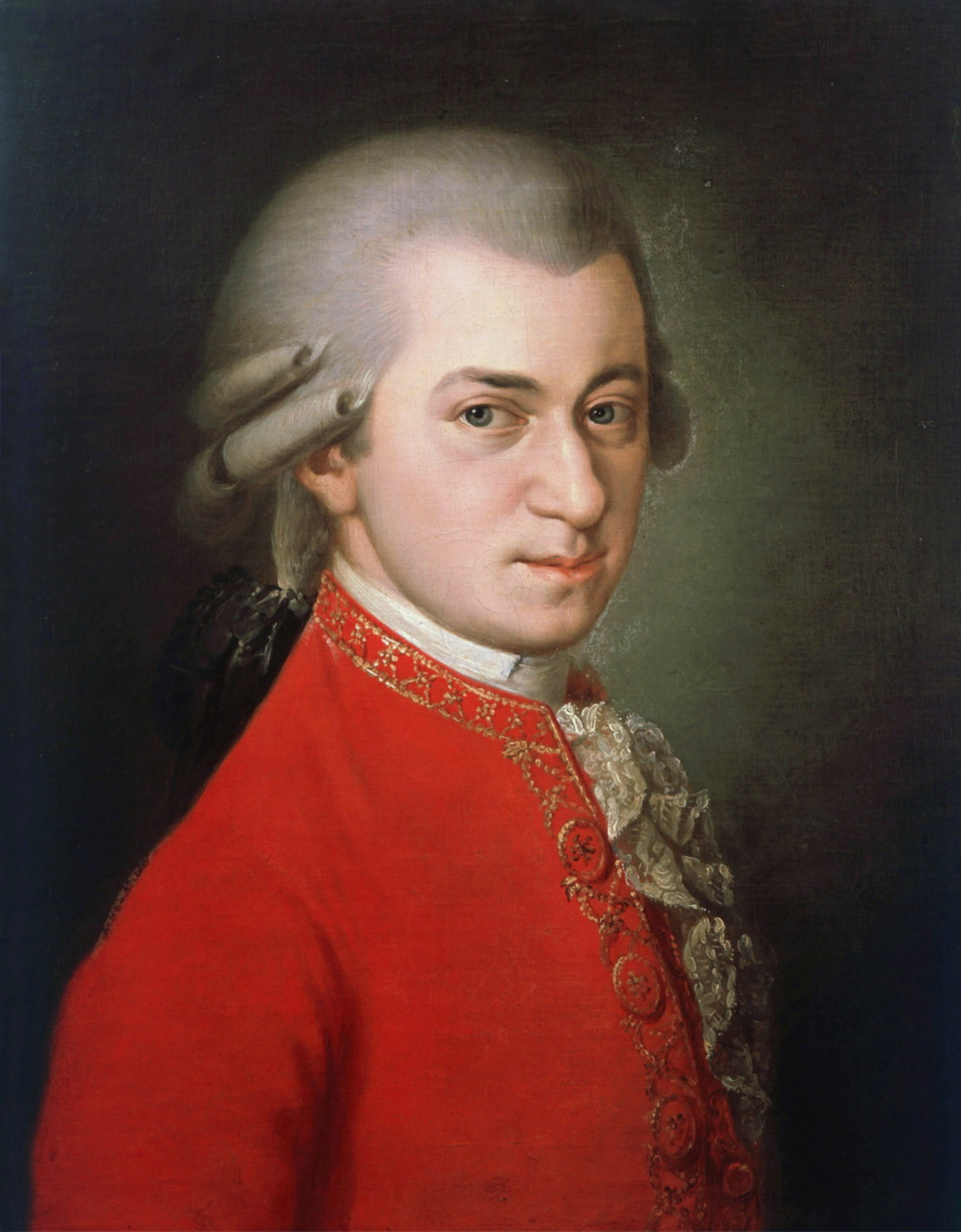
Wolfgang Amadeus Mozart, posthumous painting by Barbara Krafft in 1819

Haydn, having worked for over a decade as the music director for a prince, had far more resources and scope for composing than most other composers. His position also gave him the ability to shape the forces that would play his music, as he could select skilled musicians. This opportunity was not wasted, as Haydn, beginning quite early on his career, sought to press forward the technique of building and developing ideas in his music. His next important breakthrough was in the Opus 33 string quartets (1781), in which the melodic and the harmonic roles segue among the instruments: it is often momentarily unclear what is melody and what is harmony. This changes the way the ensemble works its way between dramatic moments of transition and climactic sections: the music flows smoothly and without obvious interruption. He then took this integrated style and began applying it to orchestral and vocal music.

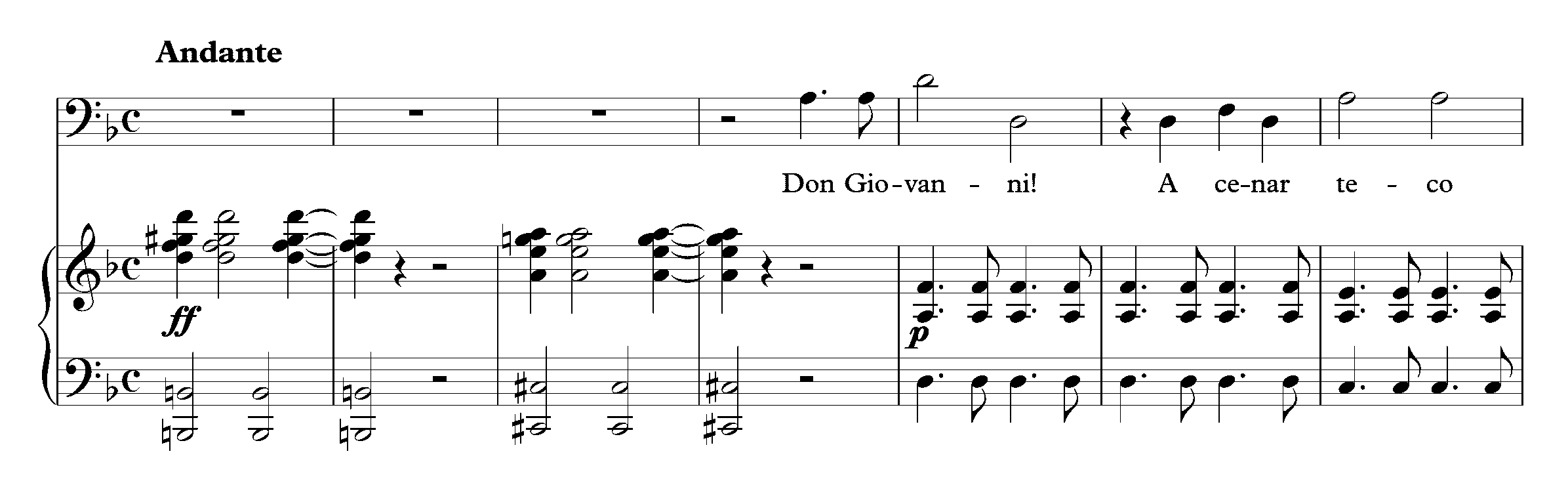
The opening bars of the Commendatore's aria in Mozart's opera Don Giovanni. The orchestra starts with a dissonant diminished seventh chord (G# dim7 with a B in the bass) moving to a dominant seventh chord (A7 with a C# in the bass) before resolving to the tonic chord (D minor) at the singer's entrance.

Haydn's gift to music was a way of composing, a way of structuring works, which was at the same time in accord with the governing aesthetic of the new style. However, a younger contemporary, Wolfgang Amadeus Mozart, brought his genius to Haydn's ideas and applied them to two of the major genres of the day: opera, and the virtuoso concerto. Whereas Haydn spent much of his working life as a court composer, Mozart wanted public success in the concert life of cities, playing for the general public. This meant he needed to write operas and write and perform virtuoso pieces. Haydn was not a virtuoso at the international touring level; nor was he seeking to create operatic works that could play for many nights in front of a large audience. Mozart wanted to achieve both. Moreover, Mozart also had a taste for more chromatic chords (and greater contrasts in harmonic language generally), a greater love for creating a welter of melodies in a single work, and a more Italianate sensibility in music as a whole. He found, in Haydn's music and later in his study of the polyphony of J.S. Bach, the means to discipline and enrich his artistic gifts.

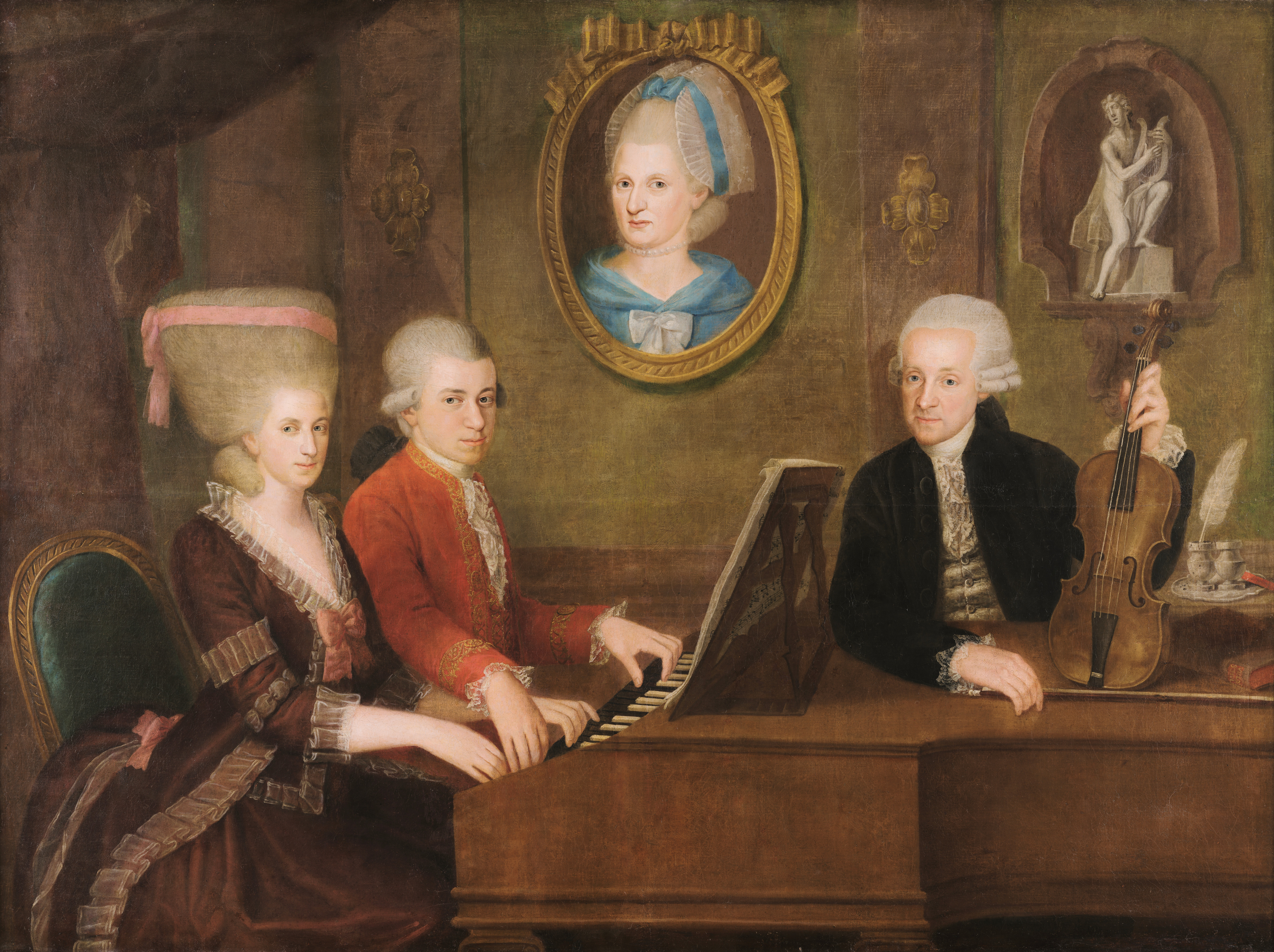
Portrait of the Mozart Family, dated 1780–81

Mozart rapidly came to the attention of Haydn, who hailed the new composer, studied his works, and considered the younger man his only true peer in music. In Mozart, Haydn found a greater range of instrumentation, dramatic effect and melodic resource. The learning relationship moved in both directions. Mozart also had a great respect for the older, more experienced composer, and sought to learn from him.

Mozart's arrival in Vienna in 1780 brought an acceleration in the development of the Classical style. There, Mozart absorbed the fusion of Italianate brilliance and Germanic cohesiveness that had been brewing for the previous 20 years. His own taste for flashy brilliances, rhythmically complex melodies and figures, long cantilena melodies, and virtuoso flourishes was merged with an appreciation for formal coherence and internal connectedness. It is at this point that war and economic inflation halted a trend to larger orchestras and forced the disbanding or reduction of many theater orchestras. This pressed the Classical style inwards: toward seeking greater ensemble and technical challenges—for example, scattering the melody across woodwinds, or using a melody harmonized in thirds. This process placed a premium on small ensemble music, called chamber music. It also led to a trend for more public performance, giving a further boost to the string quartet and other small ensemble groupings.

It was during this decade that public taste began, increasingly, to recognize that Haydn and Mozart had reached a high standard of composition. By the time Mozart arrived at age 25, in 1781, the dominant styles of Vienna were recognizably connected to the emergence in the 1750s of the early Classical style. By the end of the 1780s, changes in performance practice, the relative standing of instrumental and vocal music, technical demands on musicians, and stylistic unity had become established in the composers who imitated Mozart and Haydn. During this decade Mozart composed his most famous operas, his six late symphonies that helped to redefine the genre, and a string of piano concerti that still stand at the pinnacle of these forms.

One composer who was influential in spreading the more serious style that Mozart and Haydn had formed is Muzio Clementi, a gifted virtuoso pianist who tied with Mozart in a musical "duel" before the emperor in which they each improvised on the piano and performed their compositions. Clementi's sonatas for the piano circulated widely, and he became the most successful composer in London during the 1780s. Also in London at this time was Jan Ladislav Dussek, who, like Clementi, encouraged piano makers to extend the range and other features of their instruments, and then fully exploited the newly opened up possibilities. The importance of London in the Classical period is often overlooked, but it served as the home to the Broadwood's factory for piano manufacturing and as the base for composers who, while less notable than the "Vienna School", had a decisive influence on what came later. They were composers of many fine works, notable in their own right. London's taste for virtuosity may well have encouraged the complex passage work and extended statements on tonic and dominant.

=== Around 1790–1820 ===
When Haydn and Mozart began composing, symphonies were played as single movements—before, between, or as interludes within other works—and many of them lasted only ten or twelve minutes; instrumental groups had varying standards of playing, and the continuo was a central part of music-making.

In the intervening years, the social world of music had seen dramatic changes. International publication and touring had grown explosively, and concert societies formed. Notation became more specific, more descriptive—and schematics for works had been simplified (yet became more varied in their exact working out). In 1790, just before Mozart's death, with his reputation spreading rapidly, Haydn was poised for a series of successes, notably his late oratorios and London symphonies. Composers in London, Vienna, Paris, Rome, and all over Germany turned to Haydn and Mozart for their ideas on form.

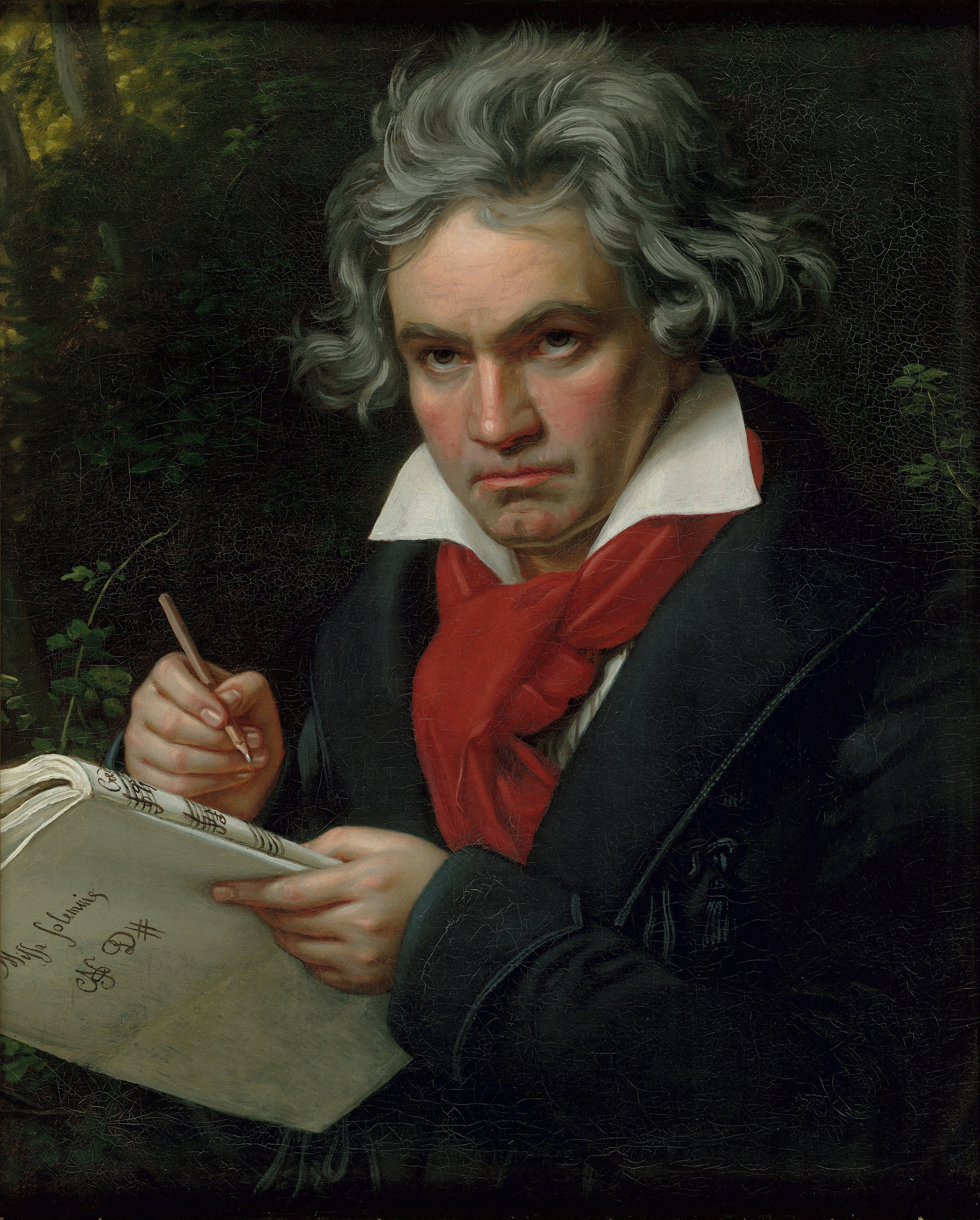
Portrait of Beethoven, 1820

In the 1790s, a new generation of composers, born around 1770, emerged. While they had grown up with the earlier styles, they heard in the recent works of Haydn and Mozart a vehicle for greater expression. In 1788 Luigi Cherubini settled in Paris and in 1791 composed Lodoiska, an opera that raised him to fame. Its style is clearly reflective of the mature Haydn and Mozart, and its instrumentation gave it a weight that had not yet been felt in the grand opera. His contemporary Étienne Méhul extended instrumental effects with his 1790 opera Euphrosine et Coradin, from which followed a series of successes. The final push towards change came from Gaspare Spontini, who was deeply admired by future romantic composers such as Weber, Berlioz and Wagner. The innovative harmonic language of his operas, their refined instrumentation and their "enchained" closed numbers (a structural pattern which was later adopted by Weber in Euryanthe and from him handed down, through Marschner, to Wagner), formed the basis from which French and German romantic opera had its beginnings.

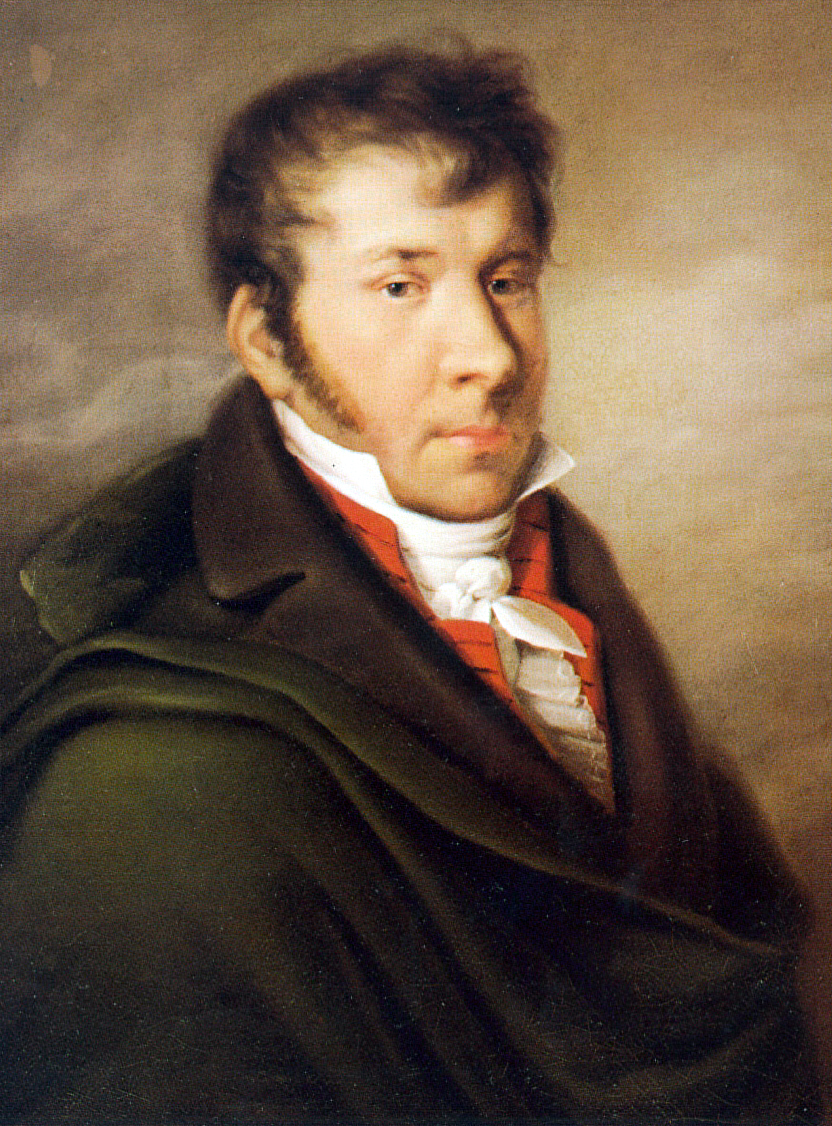
Hummel in 1814

The most fateful of the new generation was Ludwig van Beethoven, who launched his numbered works in 1794 with a set of three piano trios, which remain in the repertoire. Somewhat younger than the others, though equally accomplished because of his youthful study under Mozart and his native virtuosity, was Johann Nepomuk Hummel. Hummel studied under Haydn as well; he was a friend to Beethoven and Franz Schubert. He concentrated more on the piano than any other instrument, and his time in London in 1791 and 1792 generated the composition and publication in 1793 of three piano sonatas, opus 2, which idiomatically used Mozart's techniques of avoiding the expected cadence, and Clementi's sometimes modally uncertain virtuoso figuration. Taken together, these composers can be seen as the vanguard of a broad change in style and the center of music. They studied one another's works, copied one another's gestures in music, and on occasion behaved like quarrelsome rivals.

The crucial differences with the previous wave can be seen in the downward shift in melodies, increasing durations of movements, the acceptance of Mozart and Haydn as paradigmatic, the greater use of keyboard resources, the shift from "vocal" writing to "pianistic" writing, the growing pull of the minor and of modal ambiguity, and the increasing importance of varying accompanying figures to bring "texture" forward as an element in music. In short, the late Classical was seeking music that was internally more complex. The growth of concert societies and amateur orchestras, marking the importance of music as part of middle-class life, contributed to a booming market for pianos, piano music, and virtuosi to serve as exemplars. Hummel, Beethoven, and Clementi were all renowned for their improvising.

The direct influence of the Baroque continued to fade: the figured bass grew less prominent as a means of holding performance together, the performance practices of the mid-18th century continued to die out. However, at the same time, complete editions of Baroque masters began to become available, and the influence of Baroque style continued to grow, particularly in the ever more expansive use of brass. Another feature of the period is the growing number of performances where the composer was not present. This led to increased detail and specificity in notation; for example, there were fewer "optional" parts that stood separately from the main score.

The force of these shifts became apparent with Beethoven's 3rd Symphony, given the name Eroica, which is Italian for "heroic", by the composer. As with Stravinsky's The Rite of Spring, it may not have been the first in all of its innovations, but its aggressive use of every part of the Classical style set it apart from its contemporary works: in length, ambition, and harmonic resources as well making it the first symphony of the Romantic era.

== First Viennese School ==
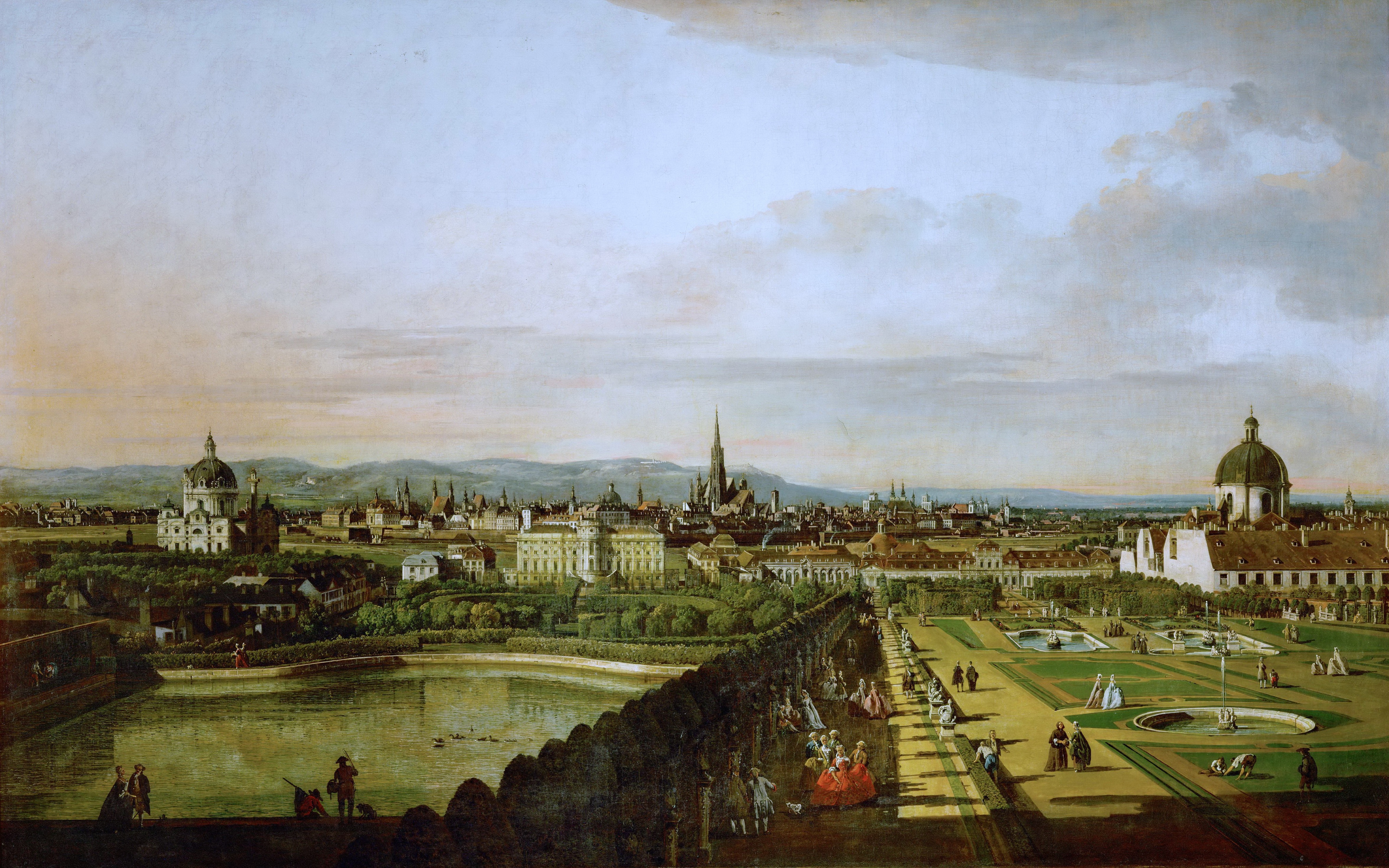
View of Vienna in 1758, by Bernardo Bellotto

The First Viennese School is a name mostly used to refer to three composers of the Classical period in late-18th-century Vienna: Haydn, Mozart, and Beethoven. Franz Schubert is occasionally added to the list.

In German-speaking countries, the term Wiener Klassik (lit. Viennese classical era/art) is used. That term is often more broadly applied to the Classical era in music as a whole, as a means to distinguish it from other periods that are colloquially referred to as classical, namely Baroque and Romantic music.

The term "Viennese School" was first used by Austrian musicologist Raphael Georg Kiesewetter in 1834, although he only counted Haydn and Mozart as members of the school. Other writers followed suit, and eventually Beethoven was added to the list. The designation "first" is added today to avoid confusion with the Second Viennese School.

Whilst, Schubert apart, these composers certainly knew each other (with Haydn and Mozart even being occasional chamber-music partners), there is no sense in which they were engaged in a collaborative effort in the sense that one would associate with 20th-century schools such as the Second Viennese School, or Les Six. Nor is there any significant sense in which one composer was "schooled" by another (in the way that Berg and Webern were taught by Schoenberg), though it is true that Beethoven for a time received lessons from Haydn.

Attempts to extend the First Viennese School to include such later figures as Anton Bruckner, Johannes Brahms, and Gustav Mahler are merely journalistic, and never encountered in academic musicology. According to scholar James F. Daugherty, the Classical period itself from approximately 1775 to 1825 is sometimes referred to as "the Viennese Classic period".

== Classical influence on later composers ==
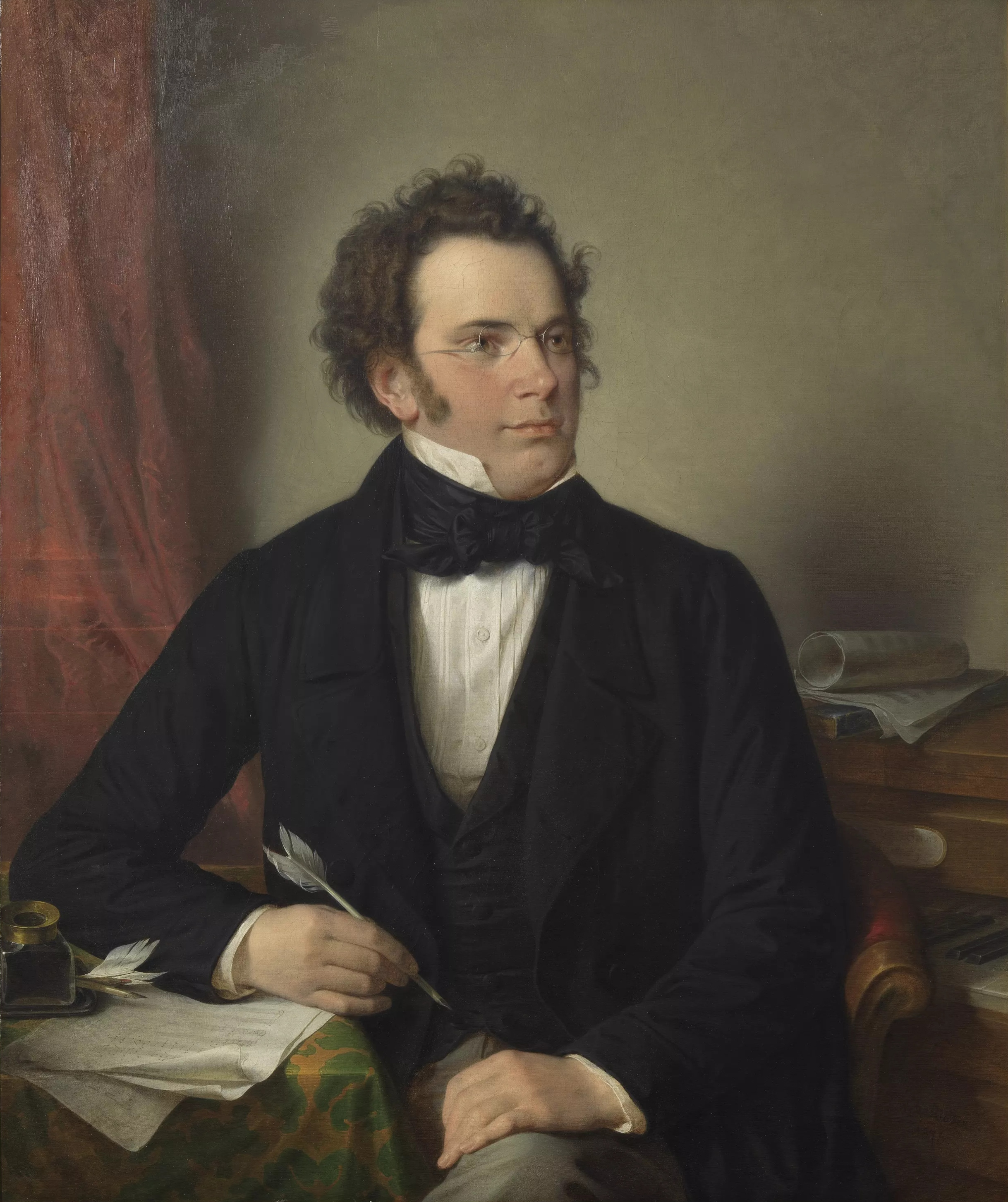
1875 oil painting of Franz Schubert by Wilhelm August Rieder, after his own 1825 watercolor portrait

Musical eras and their prevalent styles, forms and instruments seldom disappear at once; instead, features are replaced over time, until the old approach is simply felt as "old-fashioned". The Classical style did not "die" suddenly; rather, it gradually got phased out under the weight of changes. To give just one example, while it is generally stated that the Classical era stopped using the harpsichord in orchestras, this did not happen all of a sudden at the start of the Classical era in 1750. Rather, orchestras slowly stopped using the harpsichord to play basso continuo until the practice was discontinued by the end of the 1700s.

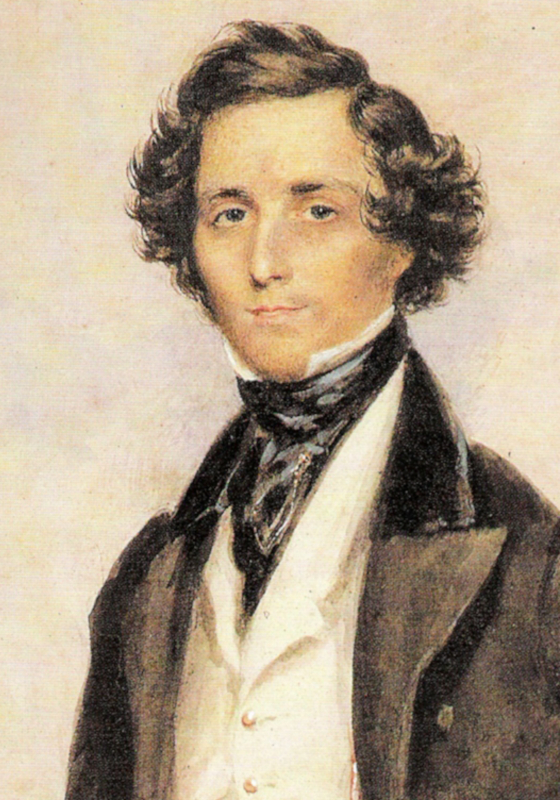
Portrait of Mendelssohn by James Warren Childe, 1839

One crucial change was the shift towards harmonies centering on "flatward" keys: shifts in the subdominant direction. In the Classical style, major key was far more common than minor, chromaticism being moderated through the use of "sharpward" modulation (e.g., a piece in C major modulating to G major, D major, or A major, all of which are keys with more sharps). As well, sections in the minor mode were often used for contrast. Beginning with Mozart and Clementi, there began a creeping colonization of the subdominant region (the ii or IV chord, which in the key of C major would be the keys of d minor or F major). With Schubert, subdominant modulations flourished after being introduced in contexts in which earlier composers would have confined themselves to dominant shifts (modulations to the dominant chord, e.g., in the key of C major, modulating to G major). This introduced darker colors to music, strengthened the minor mode, and made structure harder to maintain. Beethoven contributed to this by his increasing use of the fourth as a consonance, and modal ambiguity—for example, the opening of the Symphony No. 9 in D minor.

Ludwig van Beethoven, Franz Schubert, Carl Maria von Weber, Johann Nepomuk Hummel, and John Field are among the most prominent in this generation of "Proto-Romantics", along with the young Felix Mendelssohn. Their sense of form was strongly influenced by the Classical style. While they were not yet "learned" composers (imitating rules which were codified by others), they directly responded to works by Haydn, Mozart, Clementi, and others, as they encountered them. The instrumental forces at their disposal in orchestras were also quite "Classical" in number and variety, permitting similarity with Classical works.

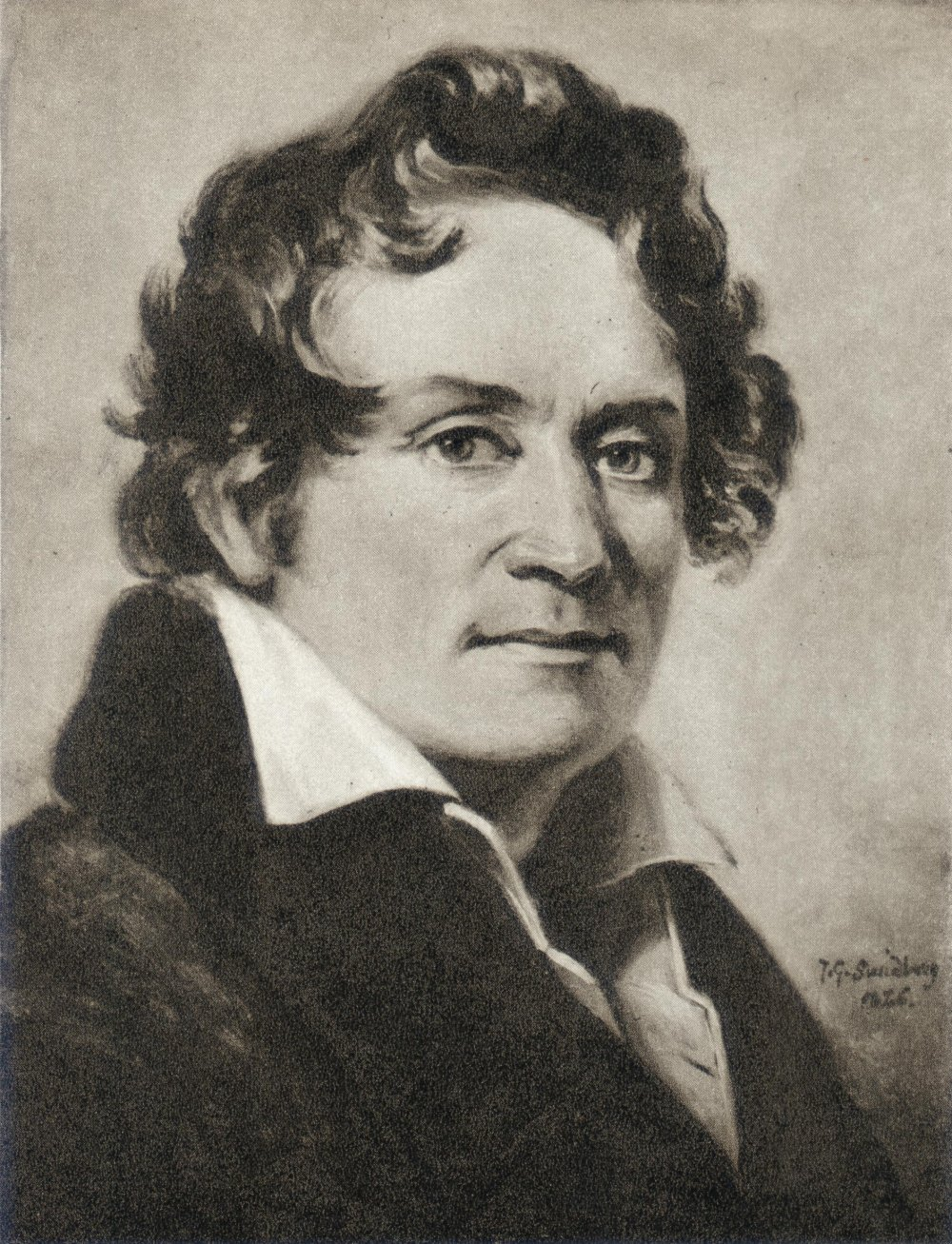
Bernhard Crusell, a Swedish-Finnish composer and clarinetist, in 1826

However, the forces destined to end the hold of the Classical style gathered strength in the works of many of the above composers, particularly Beethoven. The most commonly cited one is harmonic innovation. Also important is the increasing focus on having a continuous and rhythmically uniform accompanying figuration: Beethoven's Moonlight Sonata was the model for hundreds of later pieces—where the shifting movement of a rhythmic figure provides much of the drama and interest of the work, while a melody drifts above it. Greater knowledge of works, greater instrumental expertise, increasing variety of instruments, the growth of concert societies, and the unstoppable domination of the increasingly more powerful piano (which was given a bolder, louder tone by technological developments such as the use of steel strings, heavy cast-iron frames and sympathetically vibrating strings) all created a huge audience for sophisticated music. All of these trends contributed to the shift to the "Romantic" style.

Drawing the line between these two styles is very difficult: some sections of Mozart's later works, taken alone, are indistinguishable in harmony and orchestration from music written 80 years later—and some composers continued to write in normative Classical styles into the early 20th century. Even before Beethoven's death, composers such as Louis Spohr were self-described Romantics, incorporating, for example, more extravagant chromaticism in their works (e.g., using chromatic harmonies in a piece's chord progression). Conversely, works such as Schubert's Symphony No. 5, written during the chronological end of the Classical era and dawn of the Romantic era, exhibit a deliberately anachronistic artistic paradigm, harking back to the compositional style of several decades before.

However, Vienna's fall as the most important musical center for orchestral composition during the late 1820s, precipitated by the deaths of Beethoven and Schubert, marked the Classical style's final eclipse—and the end of its continuous organic development of one composer learning in close proximity to others. Franz Liszt and Frédéric Chopin visited Vienna when they were young, but they then moved on to other cities. Composers such as Carl Czerny, while deeply influenced by Beethoven, also searched for new ideas and new forms to contain the larger world of musical expression and performance in which they lived.

Renewed interest in the formal balance and restraint of 18th century classical music led in the early 20th century to the development of so-called Neoclassical style, which numbered Stravinsky and Prokofiev among its proponents, at least at certain times in their careers.

== Classical period instruments ==
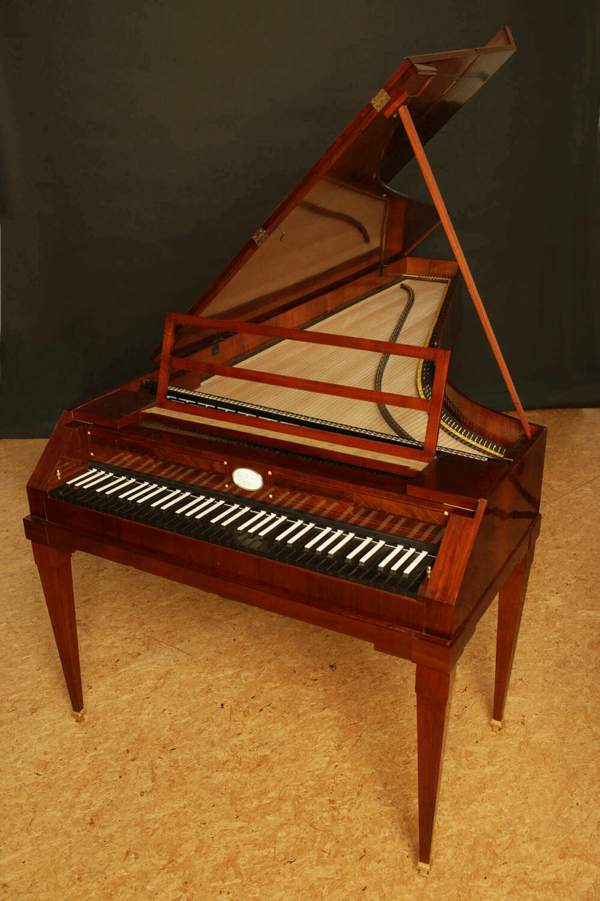
Fortepiano by Paul McNulty after Walter & Sohn, c. 1805

=== Guitar ===
The Baroque guitar, with four or five sets of double strings or "courses" and elaborately decorated soundhole, was a very different instrument from the early classical guitar which more closely resembles the modern instrument with the standard six strings. Judging by the number of instructional manuals published for the instrument – over three hundred texts were published by over two hundred authors between 1760 and 1860 – the classical period marked a golden age for guitar.

Learning from the guitar back then was passed down, as there were no repertoire books made until the 17th century, by Spanish, Portuguese, Italian, and French composers. By the 19th century the guitar could be found sporadically in north america.

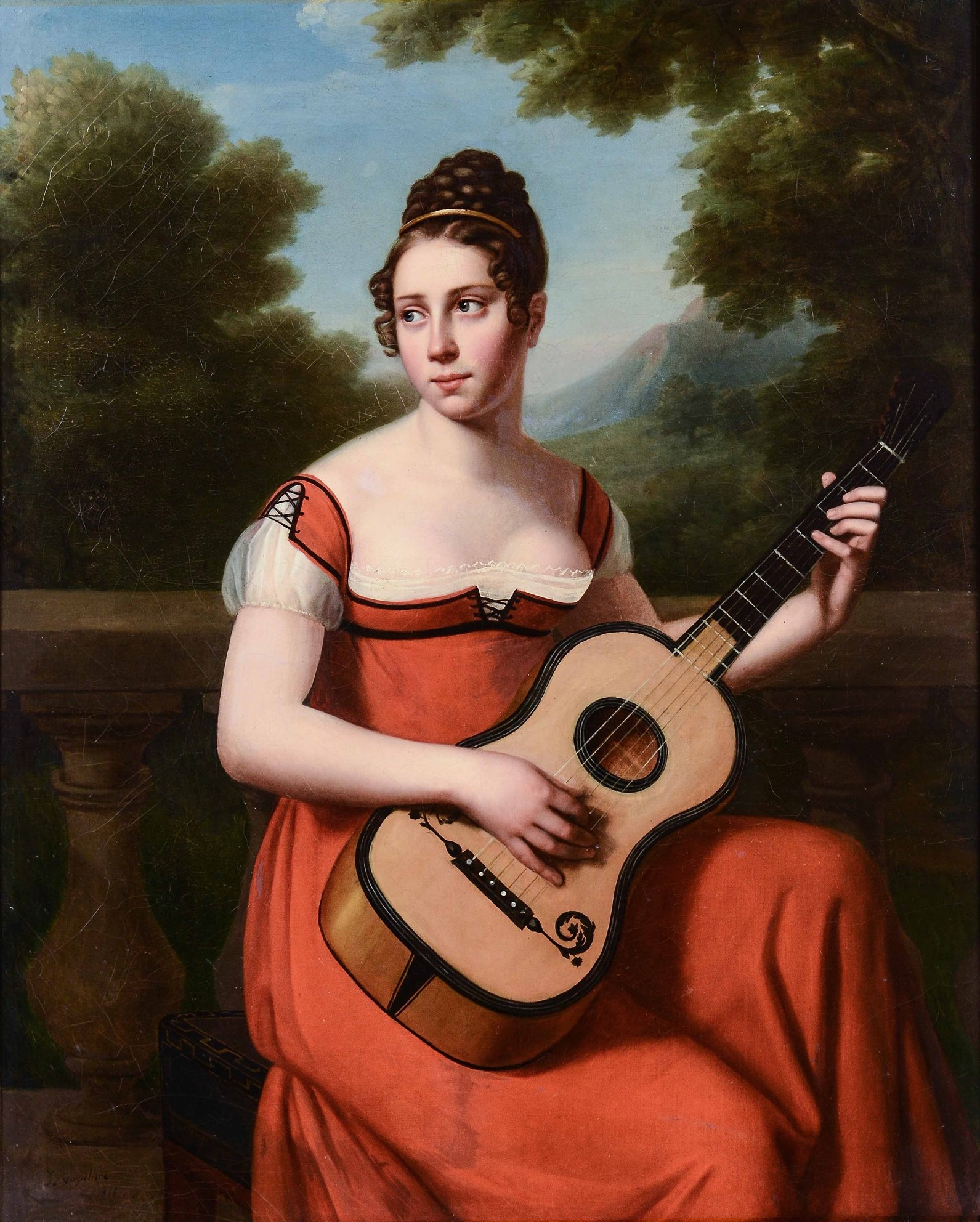
An example of a guitar from the classical period

=== Strings ===
In the Baroque era, there was more variety in the bowed stringed instruments used in ensembles, with instruments such as the viola d'amore and a range of fretted viols being used, ranging from small viols to large bass viols. In the Classical period, the string section of the orchestra was standardized as just four instruments:

- Violin (in orchestras and chamber music, typically there are first violins and second violins, with the former playing the melody and/or a higher line and the latter playing either a countermelody, a harmony part, a part below the first violin line in pitch, or an accompaniment line)
- Viola (the alto voice of the orchestral string section and string quartet; it often performs "inner voices", which are accompaniment lines which fill in the harmony of the piece)
- Cello (the cello plays two roles in Classical era music; at times it is used to play the bassline of the piece, typically doubled by the double basses [Note: When cellos and double basses read the same bassline, the basses play an octave below the cellos, because the bass is a transposing instrument]; and at other times it performs melodies and solos in the lower register)
- Double bass (the bass typically performs the lowest pitches in the string section in order to provide the bassline for the piece)

In the Baroque era, the double bass players were not usually given a separate part; instead, they typically played the same basso continuo bassline that the cellos and other low-pitched instruments (e.g., theorbo, serpent wind instrument, viols), albeit an octave below the cellos, because the double bass is a transposing instrument that sounds one octave lower than it is written. In the Classical era, some composers continued to write only one bass part for their symphony, labeled "bassi"; this bass part was played by cellists and double bassists. During the Classical era, some composers began to give the double basses their own part.

=== Woodwinds ===
It was commonplace for all orchestras to have at least 2 winds, usually oboes, flutes, clarinets, bassoons, or sometimes English horns (see Symphony No. 22 (Haydn). Patrons also usually employed an ensemble of entirely winds, called the harmonie, which would be employed for certain events. The harmonie would sometimes join the larger string orchestra to serve as the wind section.

- Piccolo (used in military bands)
- Flute
- Oboe
- English horn
- Clarinet
- Basset horn (see Requiem (Mozart))
- Basset clarinet
- Clarinette d'amour
- Bassoon
- Contrabassoon (see The Creation (Haydn))
- Bagpipe (see Leopold Mozart's divertimento, "Die Bauernhochzeit" or "Peasant Wedding")

=== Percussion ===
- Timpani
- "Turkish music":
  - Bass drum
  - Cymbals
  - Triangle
  - Tambourine

=== Keyboards ===
- Clavichord
- Fortepiano (the forerunner to the modern piano)
- Harpsichord, the standard Baroque era basso continuo keyboard instrument, was used until the 1750s, after which time it was gradually phased out, and replaced with the fortepiano and then the piano. By the early 1800s, the harpsichord was no longer used.
- Organ

=== Brasses ===
- Natural horn
- Natural trumpet
- Trombone (usually used in operas and sacred works)
- Keyed trumpet (see Trumpet Concerto (Haydn))
- Serpent (commonplace in military bands)
- Post horn (see Serenade No. 9 (Mozart))
