= Gossel =

- Ortsteil of Geratal
- Coat of arms
- Interactive map of Gossel
- Location within Germany Location within Thuringia
- Coordinates: 50°48′N 10°51′E
- Country: Germany
- State: Thuringia
- District: Ilm-Kreis
- Municipality: Geratal

Area
  - Total: 13.61 km^{2} (5.25 sq mi)
- Elevation: 490 m (1,610 ft)

Population (2017-12-31)
  - Total: 460
  - Density: 34/km^{2} (88/sq mi)
- Time zone: UTC+01:00 (CET)
  - Summer (DST): UTC+02:00 (CEST)
- Postal codes: 99338
- Dialling codes: 036207
- Website: www.gemeinde-geratal.de/gemeinde-gossel/

Gossel (German pronunciation: [ˈɡɔsl̩]) is a village and a former municipality in the district Ilm-Kreis, in Thuringia, Germany. Since 1 January 2019, it is part of the municipality Geratal.
