= Liebenstein =

- Ortsteil of Geratal
- Coat of arms
- Interactive map of Liebenstein
- Location within Germany Location within Thuringia
- Coordinates: 50°46′8″N 10°51′15″E
- Country: Germany
- State: Thuringia
- District: Ilm-Kreis
- Municipality: Geratal

Area
  - Total: 12.23 km^{2} (4.72 sq mi)
- Elevation: 365 m (1,198 ft)

Population (2017-12-31)
  - Total: 371
  - Density: 30.3/km^{2} (78.6/sq mi)
- Time zone: UTC+01:00 (CET)
  - Summer (DST): UTC+02:00 (CEST)
- Postal codes: 99330
- Dialling codes: 036207
- Vehicle registration: IK

Liebenstein (German pronunciation: [ˈliːbn̩ʃtaɪn]) is a village and a former municipality in the district Ilm-Kreis, in Thuringia, Germany. Since 1 January 2019, it is part of the municipality Geratal.
