= Geschwenda =

- Ortsteil of Geratal
- Coat of arms
- Interactive map of Geschwenda
- Location within Germany Location within Thuringia
- Coordinates: 50°43′53″N 10°49′33″E
- Country: Germany
- State: Thuringia
- District: Ilm-Kreis
- Municipality: Geratal

Area
  - Total: 5.88 km^{2} (2.27 sq mi)
- Elevation: 478 m (1,568 ft)

Population (2017-12-31)
  - Total: 1,979
  - Density: 337/km^{2} (872/sq mi)
- Time zone: UTC+01:00 (CET)
  - Summer (DST): UTC+02:00 (CEST)
- Postal codes: 98716
- Dialling codes: 036205
- Vehicle registration: IK
- Website: gemeinde-geratal.de

Geschwenda (German pronunciation: [ɡəˈʃvɛnda]) is a village and a former municipality in the district Ilm-Kreis, in Thuringia, Germany. Since 1 January 2019, it is part of the municipality Geratal. The Olympian Bruno Bartholome was born here.
