= Empfindsamkeit (music) =

Style of musical composition and poetry developed in 18th-century Germany

Empfindsamkeit (English: sentimental style) or Empfindsamer Stil is a style of musical composition and poetry developed in 18th-century Germany, intended to express "true and natural" feelings, and featuring sudden contrasts of mood. It was developed as a contrast to the Baroque Affektenlehre (doctrine of the affections), in which a composition (or movement) would have the same affect (e.g., emotion or musical mood) throughout.

== Etymology ==
The German noun "Empfindsamkeit" is usually translated as "sensibility" (in the sense used by Jane Austen in her novel Sense and Sensibility), while the adjective empfindsam is sometimes rendered as "sentimental" or "ultrasensitive". "Empfindsamkeit" is also sometimes translated, and may even be derived from the English word sentimentality, since it is related to the then-contemporary English literature sentimentality literary movement.

== History ==
The empfindsamer Stil is similar to and often considered a dialect of the international galant style, which is marked by simple homophonic textures (a single, clear melody, supported by subordinate chordal accompaniment) and periodic melodic phrases. However, unlike the broader galant style, empfindsamer Stil tends to avoid lavish ornamentation.

The dramatic fluidity that was a goal of the empfindsamer Stil has encouraged historians to view mid-century Empfindsamkeit as a slightly earlier parallel to the showier and stormier phase called Sturm und Drang (storm and stress) that emerged around 1770. These two trends are together regarded as "pre-Romantic" manifestations, because of their emphasis on features such as extreme expressive contrasts with disruptive incursions, instability of key, sudden changes of register, dynamic contrast, and exciting orchestral effects, all of which are atypical of musical classicism as practiced in the second half of the eighteenth century.

=== In music ===
The empfindsamer Stil is especially associated with the so-called Berlin School at the Prussian court of Frederick the Great (himself a minor composer, in addition to being a patron). Traits characteristic for composers of this school are a particular fondness for Adagio movements and precise attention to ornaments and dynamics, as well as the liberal use of appoggiaturas ("sigh" figures) and frequent melodic and harmonic chromaticism.

== See also ==
- Galant music
