= Frankenhain =

- Ortsteil of Geratal
- Coat of arms
- Interactive map of Frankenhain
- Location within Germany Location within Thuringia
- Coordinates: 50°45′25″N 10°47′20″E
- Country: Germany
- State: Thuringia
- District: Ilm-Kreis
- Municipality: Geratal

Area
  - Total: 12.25 km^{2} (4.73 sq mi)
- Elevation: 480 m (1,570 ft)

Population (2017-12-31)
  - Total: 711
  - Density: 58.0/km^{2} (150/sq mi)
- Time zone: UTC+01:00 (CET)
  - Summer (DST): UTC+02:00 (CEST)
- Postal codes: 99330
- Dialling codes: 036205
- Vehicle registration: IK
- Website: www.frankenhain.de

Frankenhain (German pronunciation: [ˈfʁaŋkn̩haɪn]) is a village and a former municipality in the district Ilm-Kreis, in Thuringia, Germany. Since 1 January 2019, it is part of the municipality Geratal. It is well known for its biathlon club.
