= Galant music =

1750s–1770s Western European music style

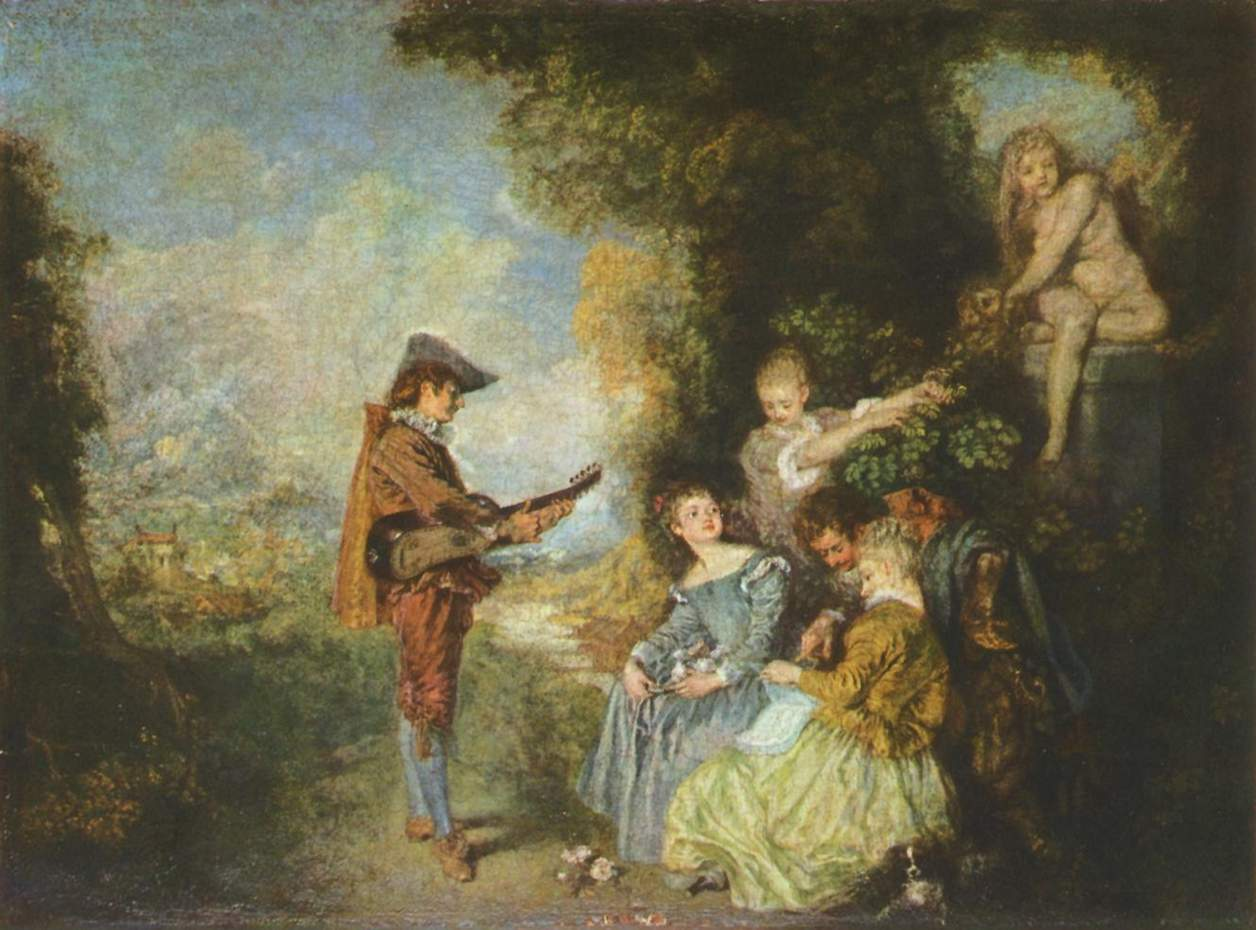
"La Leçon d'Amour" by Antoine Watteau, exemplifying the elegance and lighthearted charm of the galant era.

In music, galant refers to the style which was fashionable in the upper-class societies of Western Europe from the 1720s to the 1770s. In the 19th and 20th centuries, musicologists gave the term a narrower meaning. They used it to describe compositions that moved away from the Baroque's rhetorical formal style, but only partly showed traits of the pre-classical period. The galant style can be seen as a step towards the formally freer, sensitive style, Empfindsamkeit, that prepared the early classical period.

== Music styles ==
This movement featured a return to simplicity and immediacy of appeal after the complexity of the late Baroque era. The galant style developed a set of stock melodic and harmonic patterns known as galant schemata. This meant simpler, more song-like melodies, decreased use of polyphony, short, periodic phrases, a reduced harmonic vocabulary emphasizing tonic and dominant, and a clear distinction between soloist and accompaniment. Carl Philipp Emanuel Bach and Daniel Gottlob Türk, who were among the most significant theorists of the late 18th century, contrasted the galant with the "learned" or "strict" styles. The "strict" style refers to the use of counterpoint with multiple independent voices working against each other (such as Bach's fugues). Galant composers deliberately favored a single and singable melody played over simple accompaniment.

The German empfindsamer Stil, which seeks to express personal emotions and sensitivity, can be seen as a closely related North-German dialect of the international galant style.

This musical style was part of the wider galant movement in art at the time.

The word "galant" derives from French, where it was in use from at least the 16th century. In the early 18th century, a galant homme described a person of fashion, who was elegant, cultured and virtuous. The German theorist Johann Mattheson appears to have been fond of the term. It features in the title of his first publication of 1713, Das neu-eröffnete Orchestre, oder Universelle und gründliche Anleitung wie ein Galant Homme einen vollkommenen Begriff von der Hoheit und Würde der edlen Music erlangen. (Instead of the Gothic type rendered here in italics, Mattheson used Roman to emphasize the many non-German expressions.

Mattheson was apparently the first to refer to a "galant style" in music, in his Das forschende Orchestre of 1721. He recognized a lighter, modern style, einem galanten Stylo and named among its leading practitioners Giovanni Bononcini, Antonio Caldara, Georg Philipp Telemann, Alessandro Scarlatti, Antonio Vivaldi and George Frideric Handel.

Not every contemporary was delighted with this revolutionary simplification: Johann Samuel Petri, in his Anleitung zur praktischen Musik (1782) spoke of the "great catastrophe in music".

The change was as much at the birth of Romanticism as it was of Classicism. The folk-song element in poetry, like the singable cantabile melody in galant music, was brought to public notice in Thomas Percy's Reliques of Ancient Poetry (1765) and James Macpherson's "Ossian" inventions during the 1760s.

This simplified style was melody-driven, not constructed on rhythmic or melodic motifs as so much classical music was to be: "It is indicative that Haydn, even in his old age, is reported to have said, 'If you want to know whether a melody is really beautiful, sing it without accompaniment'". This simplification also extended to harmonic rhythm, which is generally slower in galant music than is the case in the earlier baroque style, thus making lavish melodic ornamentation and nuances of secondary harmonic colorings more important.

The affinities of galant style with Rococo in the visual arts are easily overplayed, but characteristics that were valued in both genres were freshness, accessibility and charm. Watteau's fêtes galantes were rococo not merely in subject matter, but also in the lighter, cleaner tonality of his palette, and the glazes that supplied a galant translucency to his finished pictures often compared to the orchestrations of galant music.

This style of music was often expressed through forms like keyboard sonata, Opera Buffa and Intermezzo, Minuet, Trio, Waltz, Polonaise, Gavotte, Divertimento, and chamber music (either accompanying keyboard or wind and string ensembles).

Galant music faded and transitioned into the Classical period largely as Haydn and Mozart's music began to develop more structural complexity and motivic development and strayed away from the use of galant schemata. As forms became more sophisticated, it gradually eclipsed the lighter and more ornamental galant style.

== Key Composers ==
- J.C. Bach
- C.P.E. Bach
- Johann Adolph Hasse
- Carl Friedrich Abel
- Baldassare Galuppi
- Domenico Scarlatti

== See also ==
- Empfindsamkeit (music)
- Galant schemata
