= Gera (river) =

River in Germany

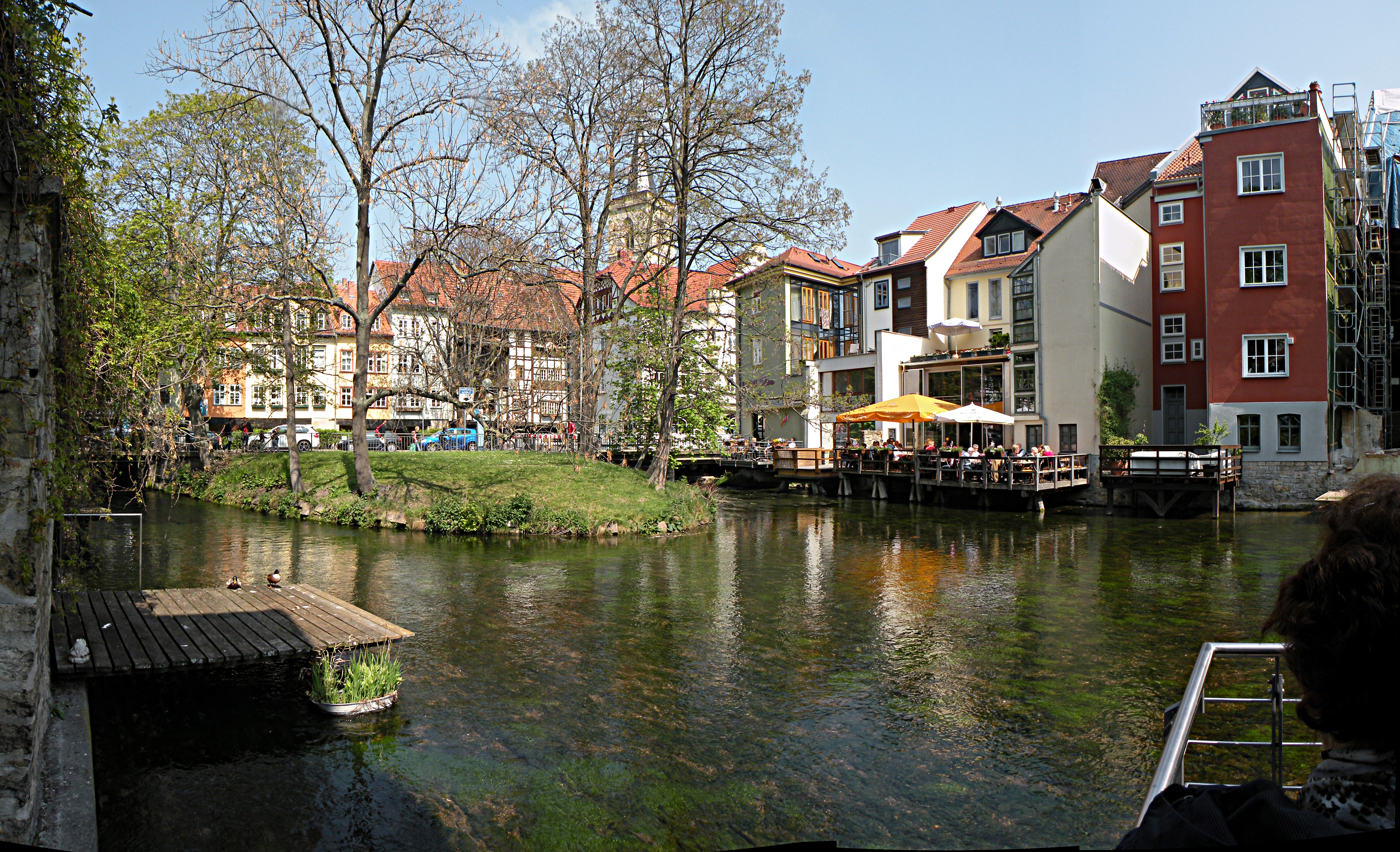

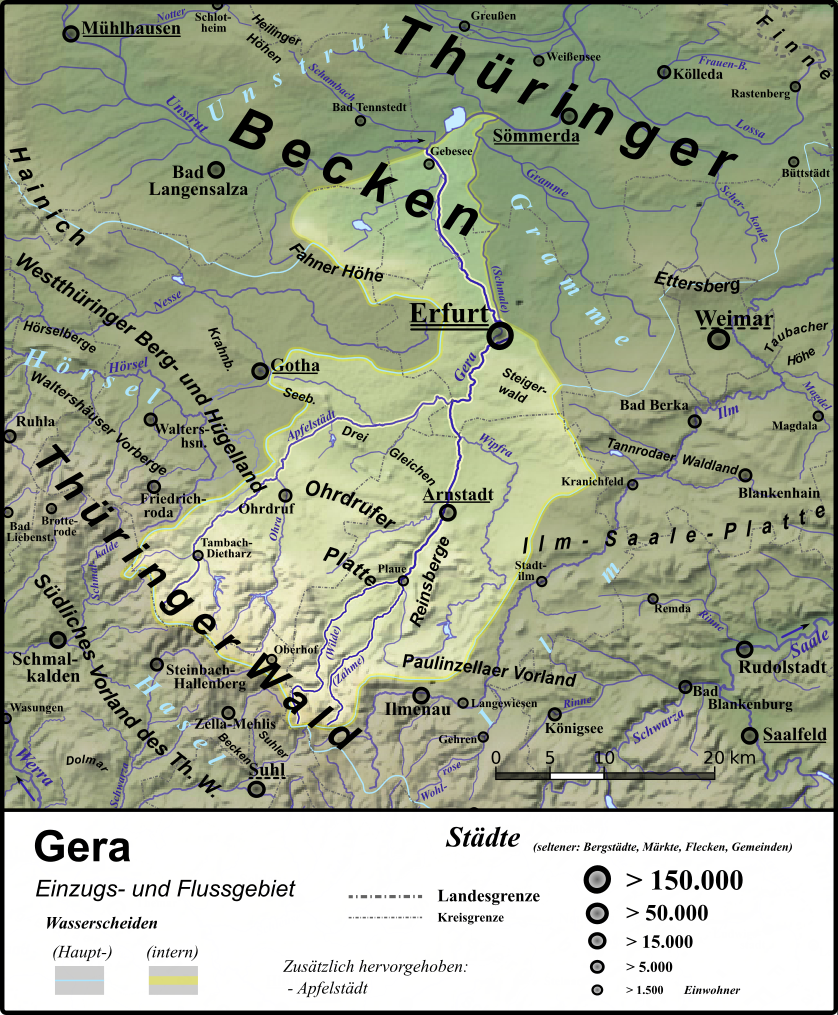

Location
- Country: Germany

Physical characteristics
- Source
  - location: Thuringian Forest
- Mouth
  - location: Unstrut
  - coordinates: 51°7′37″N 10°55′50″E
- Length: 85 km (53 mi)

Basin features
- Progression: Unstrut→ Saale→ Elbe→ North Sea

The Gera (German pronunciation: [ˈɡeːʁa]) is a river in Thuringia, Germany.

The Gera is a right tributary of the Unstrut. It originates in the Thuringian Forest, west of Ilmenau. The Gera is formed in Plaue, by the confluence of the Wilde Gera and the Zahme Gera. It empties into the Unstrut in Straußfurt. The total length of the Gera (including Wilde Gera) is 85 km (53 mi). The largest towns along the Gera are Arnstadt and Erfurt.

Along its way, Gera River splits up and reunites multiple times. Branches of the Gera are:

- Converging Tributaries: Wilde Gera, Zahme Gera
- Erfurt Area: Flutgraben (constructed after 1873 in order to protect Erfurt from flooding, this was successful), Bergstrom, Breitstrom, Zahme Gera
- Between Erfurt and the Unstrut: Gera, Schmale Gera, Mahlgera

The original name of Gera River was Erphes River (Latin for brown, muddy water), which survived in the name of Erfurt coming from “ford at Erphes River”.

== See also ==
- List of rivers of Thuringia
