= Nuremberg–Erfurt high-speed railway =

German train infrastructure

Coordinates: 50°30′45″N 10°59′38″E

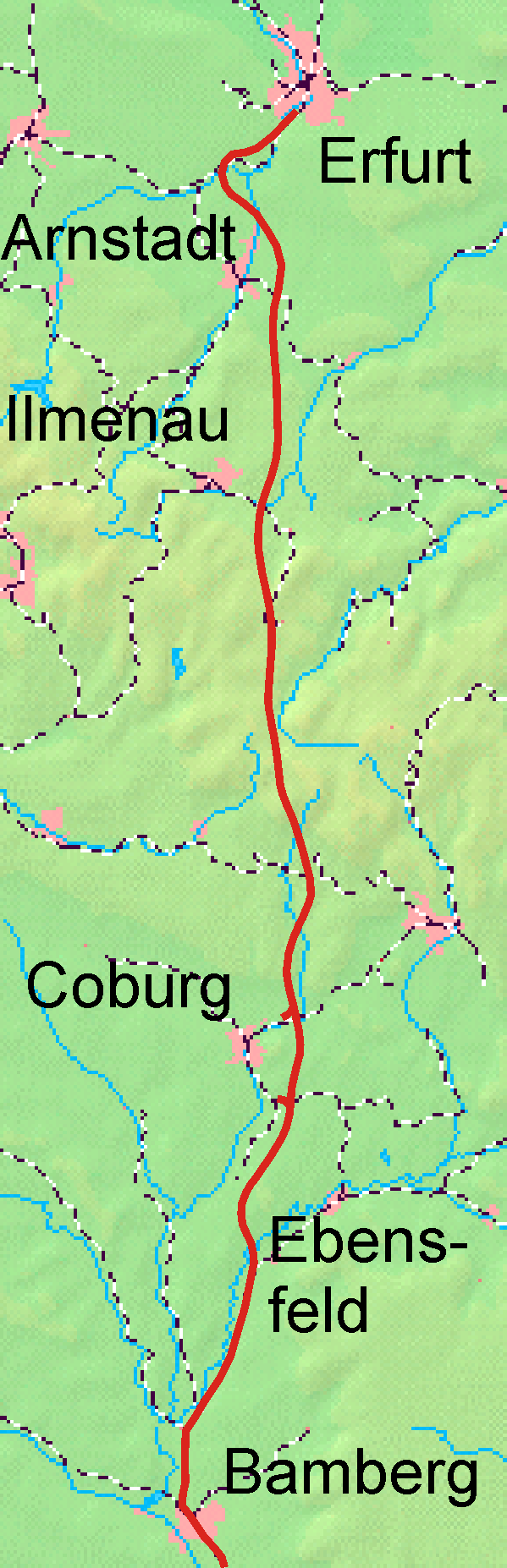

Overview
- Native name: Schnellfahrstrecke Nürnberg–Erfurt
- Locale: Thuringia and Bavaria, Germany
- Termini: Erfurt Hbf; Ebensfeld

Technical
- Line length: 107 km (66 mi)
- Num of tracks: 2
- Track gauge: 1,435 mm (4 ft 8 1/2 in) standard gauge
- Minimum radius: 3,700 m (12,139 ft)
- Electrification: 15 kV/16.7 Hz AC overhead catenary
- Operating speed: 300 km/h (186 mph)
- Maximum incline: 1.25%

The Nuremberg–Erfurt high-speed railway is a 191-kilometre-long (119 mi) German high-speed railway, between Nuremberg and Erfurt. The line is listed in Germany's federal transport plan as Verkehrsprojekt Deutsche Einheit Nr. ("German Unity transport project no") 8.1 and is a section of the high-speed route between Berlin and Munich and a section of the line connecting Italy and Scandinavia in the European Union's Trans-European Rail network. It consists of an upgraded line between Nuremberg and Ebensfeld and a new line between Ebensfeld and Erfurt. The journey time between Erfurt and Nuremberg has been reduced to approximately one hour and 20 minutes after completion.

The planning began in 1991 and construction started in April 1996. Three years later construction was stopped by the new SPD-Green coalition government formed after the 1998 election and only recommenced in 2002. The new line was opened at the timetable change on 10 December 2017. The timing of the final commissioning of the upgraded section is still uncertain.

== History ==
A trunk line between Berlin and Munich was contained in the German railway network proposed by Friedrich List in 1833. The line between Erlangen and Ebensfeld was part of the extension built in the 1840s as part of the Ludwig South-North Railway (Ludwig-Süd-Nord-Bahn). The current route, which was opened in 1851, was not based on comprehensive transport planning, but was a consequence of a network that evolved from 1840 out of lines built to serve local purposes. Since then line improvements and technical upgrades have taken place. After German reunification, the lines were restored, renovated and electrified.

According to Deutsche Bundesbahn (DB), it would be necessary to construct a new railway line because traffic forecasts showed a strong increase in passenger and freight traffic between Berlin, Leipzig, Erfurt, Nuremberg and Munich. These traffic volumes could not be handled with the existing infrastructure. The quality of operation of the existing lines would be unsatisfactory, partly due to heavy use and long service times, and it would be virtually impossible to upgrade them. Line improvements would usually have significant environmental impacts and would have strong impacts on existing buildings, due partly to dense settlement in the narrow valleys that the line passes through. The requirements of a modern railway in terms of traveling times and speeds could not be achieved by upgrading existing routes.

In mid-March 1991, Deutsche Bundesbahn announced a surprise direction from the Federal Ministry of Transportation to develop a new line between Bamberg and Erfurt.

Traffic forecasts from the early 1990s predicted a traffic load in the north–south direction for 2010 that could not be met on the existing lines. The operating concept for this target year envisaged 108 trains on the new line each day and in each direction, 24 passenger trains and 84 freight trains. For this purpose an Interregio service (Karlsruhe–Stuttgart–Nuremberg–Erfurt–Leipzig) would run at two-hour intervals and an Intercity/ICE service (Munich–Erfurt–Berlin) would run hourly over the new line; the old line (Großheringen–Saalfeld railway and Franconian Forest Railway) would be operated as an Interregio service. The Interregio trains of the new line would run via Coburg and Ilmenau and the IC/ICE services would run between Bamberg and Erfurt (although some services would stop during the day in Coburg). The IR journey would take 25 minutes from Ilmenau to Bamberg and about 20 minutes to Erfurt.

The direct distance between Nuremberg and Erfurt is around 175 kilometres, while the travel time in 2009 was around two and a quarter hours.

=== Decision to establish a high-speed line ===
Today's new and upgraded line is the result of a decision of the Federal Government in April 1991 to fund the "German Unity Transport Projects", which were incorporated in the Federal Transport Infrastructure Plan (Bundesverkehrswegeplan) 1992. The new and upgraded line was described as a "new project" with a planned total costs of Deutsche Mark (DM) 4.175 billion in the area of the former Deutsche Bundesbahn and DM 3.020 billion in the area of the former Deutsche Reichsbahn (1 January 1991 prices). The first Thuringian Minister-President, Josef Duchac, joined the Federal Minister of Transport, Günther Krause for the selection of the route corridor through Erfurt.

The construction of the route was recorded in the Federal Railway Development Act (Bundesschienenwegeausbaugesetz). The Act of 15 November 1993 entered into force on 25 November 1993.

The line became part of one of the newly created Trans-European corridors (Berlin–Verona) at the 1994 EU summit in Essen.

== Planning ==
In the preliminary planning for the new line between Ebensfeld and Erfurt, a total of seven different options were examined. Three different options were introduced into the route selection process for the Coburg and southern Thuringia areas. In February 1992, Deutsche Bundesbahn presented three options: one running from the existing section north of Lichtenfels, via Rödental and Stadtilm to Erfurt. The second option would have branched off north of Staffelstein, parallel to the planned Autobahn through Coburg and would have taken a route via Großbreitenbach and Stadtilm to Erfurt. The third option would have branched from a junction north of Ebensfeld and run via Coburg, Eisfeld, Großbreitenbach and Arnstadt to connect with the existing Eisenach–Erfurt line at Möbisburg.

Critics of the project proposed an eastern route, via Bayreuth and Hof through eastern Thuringia and western Saxony, with a connection from Leipzig and Dresden. This option and an option that would have run near the existing lines with an approximately 42-kilometre (26 mi)-long tunnel through the Franconian Forest were examined and discarded. Others suggested an eight-kilometer tunnel through the top of the crest.

Deutsche Bahn also considered a 24-kilometre (15 mi)-long base tunnel for the crossing of the Thuringian Forest. This alternative was rejected on the grounds of high groundwater pressures (near aquifers), the need to pass below the target storage level of the Goldisthal Pumped Storage Station (together with additional sealing of the tunnel) and the need for much more elaborate safety measures.

=== Preliminary planning ===
Deutsche Reichsbahn initiated the pre-planning in the summer of 1991. A preparatory study had been submitted to the central administration of the Reichsbahn (Zentralen Hauptverwaltung der Reichsbahn, ZHvDR) in November 1991. It served as the basis for the preliminary drafting plan, which was prepared by the Planungsgesellschaft Bahnbau Deutsche Einheit ("Planning Corporation for German Unity Railway Construction") from early 1992 and confirmed by the ZHvDR at the end of 1992. At the same time, a national and environmental protection planning study was carried out with the participating federal states and the Federal Agency for Nature Conservation. Within the scope of a space sensitivity test, a large-scale corridor investigation was carried out on the scale of 1:100,000 to determine route options. Among other things, conflicts and risks in relation to spatial and environmental factors along with railway operations and economic aspects were taken into account. According to the planning as of mid-1991, commissioning would be carried out by 2000 if possible.

The preliminary draft plan of 1992 envisaged speeds of 250 km/h (160 mph) with a journey time between Nuremberg and Erfurt of 75 minutes. The planned costs were DM 8 billion (about €4 billion). Already in 1993, before the beginning of construction, the route handled 80 passenger trains during the day and 200 freight trains at night. In 1992, five options were developed that would have passed through a 20-kilometre (12 mi)-wide corridor, one of which was immediately rejected. A route through Coburg that would have required the demolition of existing buildings was also considered. At first the use of the existing line south of Coburg with a new line commencing on its southern approach had been considered as the favoured option. The Thuringian Forest would have been crossed at its narrowest point, but there would have been no stop in Coburg. In a citizens' initiative, Coburg citizens collected 13,000 signatures against the route.

=== Spatial planning and route selection ===
Bavarian land planning assessment of 30 July 1993 (full text)

On 5 October 1992, the Board of Governors of the Bundesbahn and the Reichsbahn determined the route of the new line. The spatial planning procedure was launched on 20 October 1992. The Free State of Bavaria gave its opinion on the 1 March 1993. It confirmed the compatibility of two options with the goals of land planning. The essential requirements were an ICE stop in Coburg, the replacement of embankments by bridges in ecologically sensitive areas, the relocation of the planned over-taking station in Dorfles-Esbach to the south and the lowest possible crossing of the Main valley to the north of Ebensfeld. An option, which involved a route through Coburg, was abandoned in this context. In its opinion of 20 April 1993, the State of Thuringia sought, among others, an Interregio stop in the Ilmenau area, a shift of the line in the Gehren / Gräfinau-Angstedt area to the west, a western bypass of Molsdorf to protect the drinking water catchment area of Erfurt and the bundling of the route with the A 71 autobahn between Erfurt and Ilmenau. The planning approval procedure (as of mid-1994) would be carried out jointly in accordance with the railway law for both routes in this section.

Between Ebensfeld and Erfurt, three different route options were investigated in a corridor that was approximately 20 kilometres (12 mi) wide. The application documents for the line determination for the new line were submitted to the Federal Ministry of Transport in 1994 and the route was confirmed on 23 June 1994 (another source: May 1994) and the Federal Ministry of the Environment issued the decision.

The new line crosses the Werra Railway (Werrabahn) at kilometre 38.0 on the new line. In the route selection, a connection of the new line with the Werra Railway between Grümpen and Rauenstein was considered. The cost of at least €150 million was considered to be too high, so the plans were not pursued further.

=== Planning approval procedures ===
The planning procedures for the ten planning approval sections (including railway power lines) were initiated from December 1993. On 3 May 1994 the first consultation procedure for the Zapfendorf–Grub am Forst section began, dealing with 8000 objections. By the end of 1994, nine out of ten procedures had been initiated, the last one being followed in 1995. The first joint plan approval procedure for the section where the railway was "bundled" with the A 71 was launched in January 1995. In 1995, the construction of the new bridge was expected to start in the same year. Various complaints were brought against the project, which were also dealt with by the Federal Administrative Court.

Due to the Transport Route Planning Acceleration Act (Verkehrswegeplanungsbeschleunigungsgesetz) adopted specifically for the new transport routes in the new federal states, it was possible to put the first planning approval decision for the Erfurt–Arnstadt section into effect at the end of 1994. The planning approval decisions for the new routes were adopted between 24 May 1995 and 15 April 1997. In the middle of 1996, 75 kilometres (47 mi) of the new line and 22 kilometres (14 mi) of the rail power line were approved. The approvals were finalised in 1998 apart from the Erfurtstadt and Bad Staffelstein sections. In the middle of 2007, the approvals were finalised for all sections. The planning approval decision for the southern section of the railway power line from the 19 December 1995 lost its effect because the construction work had not commenced within the limited period of validity. As a result, a plan for the southern section of the railway power line to the Roth substation was reapplied for in 2012.

=== Construction halt ===
The coalition agreement of the SPD-Green coalition of 20 October 1998 expressly provided for the examination of the Saxon-Franconian trunkline as an alternative to previous plans for the project. The coalition agreed on a review of the Nuremberg–Erfurt project.

A construction site for a section of the new line was announced publicly on 30 March 1999. The Planungsgesellschaft Bahnbau Deutsche Einheit justified this in the absence of a financial agreement with the federal government. About DM 650 million had previously been invested by the company in the project. The Federal Ministry of Transport and Communications emphasised that the project would be re-examined and that the results would be available within weeks. At the end of May 1999, it became apparent that the project would not be realised in the planned form, especially due to the substitution of cheaper materials.

On 7 July 1999, the then Federal Minister of Transport Franz Müntefering informed the Bavarian Minister-President Edmund Stoiber that the new line and upgraded line would not be built for the time being. Because of the high cost of the project estimated to be DM 7 to 8 billion, other transport projects in Northern Bavaria, Saxony, Saxony-Anhalt and Thuringia would have been impossible. The scarce available funds would have to be used as efficiently as possible, according to Müntefering. In coordination with Deutsche Bahn, the Federal Government was pursuing a new strategy, in which "the emphasis would be on the maintenance and upgrading of existing routes". The section between Erfurt and Arnstadt would be "connected by a modified intermediate section to the existing line between Arnstadt and Saalfeld". Trains at Arnstadt would be routed to Saalfeld via a connecting line to the Großheringen–Saalfeld railway and would run from there to Nuremberg. The journey time from Erfurt to Nuremberg would therefore decrease from 186 to 143 minutes. An extension of the construction through the Thuringian Forest was kept open. The supervisory board of Deutsche Bahn decided not to pursue the project any further. Other alternative plans, however, were to use the Erfurt–Arnstadt–(Saalfeld) section with diesel regional cars. The Saxony-Anhalt Transport Minister Jürgen Heyer demanded to realisation of the new lew line over its full-length. The proposals led to disputes within the then CDU/SPD state government in Thuringia. Minister-President Vogel (CDU) was not able to defend his position at a cabinet meeting, calling for a correction of the decision at the federal level. It became an issue in the Thuringian Landtag election in 1999, in which Minister-President Vogel criticised the federal government repeatedly because of this decision.

At the beginning of 2000, plans were announced to continue the line progressively. The section between Erfurt and Ilmenau would be completed first and the need for an extension to Ebensfeld would be decided at a later stage and after further examination. At a joint cabinet meeting at the end of March 2000, the state governments of Bavaria and Thuringia asked for an immediate increase in the construction activity on the line and for it to be finished by 2007. They declared their willingness to support the project with funds in the order of DM 50 million.

In mid-March 2002, the federal government raised the embargo on construction and announced that it wanted to quickly settle the financing with DB. On 10 March 2002, the then Federal Chancellor Gerhard Schröder announced the resumption of construction work. He said that the project had not been financed by the previous government and therefore had to be withdrawn. Deutsche Bahn welcomed the decision. At the end of February 2002, the then Minister of Transport Kurt Bodewig had left the realisation of the project open.

=== Operating concept ===
Projected train numbers
Year	Freight trains	Passenger trains
1995	214	48
2010	169	40
2013	131	40

The new line is based on an operating concept with up to 137 trains each day and each way.

An hourly long-distance service each way with some additional trains and ICE Sprinters would be offered. The Federal Government assumed an ICE service (Berlin–Munich) with about 20 passenger trains and 70 goods trains per day and direction. In addition, an hourly service with a traffic class "below ICE standard" would be established. The documents for the plan assessment of 1995 were as follows:

"The future operating program provides the following stops for long-distance (ICE) and regional (IR) networks:

- ICE stops: Nuremberg, Bamberg, Erfurt, additionally at the ends of the day in Erlangen and Coburg,
- IR stops: Nuremberg, Erlangen, Bamberg, Coburg, Ilmenau, Erfurt."

Coburg and Ilmenau were to be served by the ICE trains in the mornings and the evening according to the planning as of 2007. A stop in Coburg would extend the journey time of an ICE by ten minutes according to Deutsche Bahn. According to the Federal Government in 2006, the operating concept envisaged nine daily train pairs serving Coburg. As a guideline for the establishment of an ICE stop in Coburg an increase of at least 60 passengers per train would be required. A re-activation of the Werra Railway between Eisfeld and Coburg would be considered as part of an upgrade of Coburg as a south Thuringian ICE stop. The estimated costs were at least €60 million.

The proposed "Ilmenau-Wolfsberg" railway station was removed from the plans in 2011. The Ilm-Kreis objected to this change of plan before the Oberverwaltungsgericht (state supreme administrative court). According to DB data, the necessary infrastructure could be retrofitted for passenger services subsequently. According to the representatives of the state of Thuringia and the city of Ilmenau, plans for a regional service on the fast-line had not been pursued on their part. Special committees of the town of Ilmenau, according to a statement by Mayor Seeber at a citizens gathering, had turned against the planned Wümbach station and "opted for the development of the existing line".

The Federal Government was expecting an increase of traffic of 1.8 million additional passengers per year after completion, generating almost 800 million passenger-kilometres. The forecast is based on a shift of approximately one million passenger journeys from the road and some 700,000 from the air (as of 2006). DB Netz planned (as of 2002) to spend €37.3 million per year after the opening of the line on a system for collecting data on train movements.

The roughly 80 freight trains per day and direction provided for in the federal transport plan for the route are to run mainly between 10 PM and 6 AM. Between 6 AM and 22 PM, one train path each hour and each way would be available for freight traffic. In order to achieve the full freight transport capacity, upgrades at the Fürth node (including a planned freight train tunnel) and the provision of four tracks between Ebensfeld and Nuremberg would be necessary.

The traffic forecast for the Federal Transport Route Plan (Bundesverkehrswegeplan) 1992 provided for 24 passenger and 90 freight trains each day and each way on the new line in 2010. In the middle of 1994, Deutsche Bahn considered that there would be 24 long-distance passenger trains and 55 freight trains on the line. The segregation of fast and slow traffic (under the Netz 21 project adopted in 1991) had not yet been considered.

Deutsche Bahn planned to have an ICE service running hourly on the line in 2030.

An operations study was based on three possible freight train paths per hour in each direction while passenger services were operating.

== Ebensfeld–Erfurt new line ==
The new line begins north of Ebensfeld near the 20.4-kilometre (12.7 mi)-mark on the Bamberg–Lichtenfels line and ends in Erfurt at the entrance signals of the station.

It is 107 kilometres long, of which 34 kilometres is located in Bavaria and 73 kilometres in Thuringia. The line runs at a normal maximum grade of 1.25%, although parts have grades of up to 2.0%. Curves have a normal minimum radius of 6,300 metres and an absolute minimum radius of 3,700 metres. Normal passing loops are 25,000 metres long and their minimum length is 22,500 metres.

It passes through the Thuringian Forest between Truckenthal and Ilmenau over a length of 27.4 kilometres and rises temporarily to a height of around 600 metres above sea level. This section contains nine tunnels with a total length of 22.7 kilometres (83% of the tunnels by length on the line). The intervening valleys are crossed by nine bridges. In a 23 kilometres long section built alongside the A 71, the line is largely confined to a 40-metre-wide strip of land.

The design speed is 300 km/h (186 mph). The planned maximum speed was initially 250 km/h (160 mph) and was later raised to 300 km/h (186 mph). One source from 2009 again refers to a planned maximum speed of 250 km/h (160 mph). For the regional services south of Coburg that have operated since 2016, the maximum permissible speed has been reduced to 250 km/h (160 mph).

More than fifty percent of the length of the route consists of civil engineering works—a new record for German high-speed railways. The planned 22 tunnels have a total length of 41 kilometres. The two longest are the Blessberg Tunnel at 8,326 metres and the Silberberg Tunnel at 7,407 metres. Its 29 viaducts have a total length of 12 km. The longest is the 1,681 m-long Ilm Viaduct. In addition, another 46 road and path crossings are planned. The ruling maximum gradient is 1.25%. In four short sections, this was increased to 2.0% to reduce capital costs. Such sections were not planned until detailed planning began in spring 1994, but in mid-1994 seven such sections were planned with longitudinal grades between 1.778 and 2.00 percent over a length of 400 metres to 1.1 kilometres.

The power supply was connected to the traction power network by means of two new spur lines running via three new substations at Roth, Ilmenau and Eischleben. The existing Ebensfeld substation was expanded for the power supply of the new line. There was no equalisation of the earth masses, which meant that about 16 million cubic metres of earth was deposited at 24 landfill sites. Near Masserberg. for example, 1.8 million cubic metres was dumped covering an area of 54.8 hectares, with a maximum height of 27 metres.

The permanent surface requirements of the new line are around 435 hectares. In the construction phase, a total of around 1200 hectares was required. Around 990 hectares has been provided for environmental compensation areas.

=== Erfurt–Ilmenau route description ===
From Erfurt station, the route runs west on the northern side of the Gera valley, parallel to the tracks of the Halle–Bebra railway (Thuringian Railway). It separates from that line before Erfurt-Bischleben in order to cross over the river and a road and enter the Augustaburg Tunnel. After the tunnel, the line turns south and parallels the Autobahn 71. First, it runs on the western side of the Autobahn and crosses the Apfelstädt, a state road and the Thuringian Railway on the Apfelstädt viaduct. This is followed by the Gera Viaduct at Ichtershausen and crossings of the A 4 at the Erfurt interchange, the A 71 in a cutting and the Gera again. As far as Neuroda, it is then built on the western side of the A 71. After passing under the A 71 through the Sandberg Tunnel, it then follows a separate route. In the following section of about seven kilometres, it passes over the Wümbach Viaduct to the new Ilmenau-Wolfsberg overtaking loops. On the way to Ilmenau, the line passes through the Thuringian Forest via nine tunnels with a total length of more than 22 kilometres.

=== Construction ===
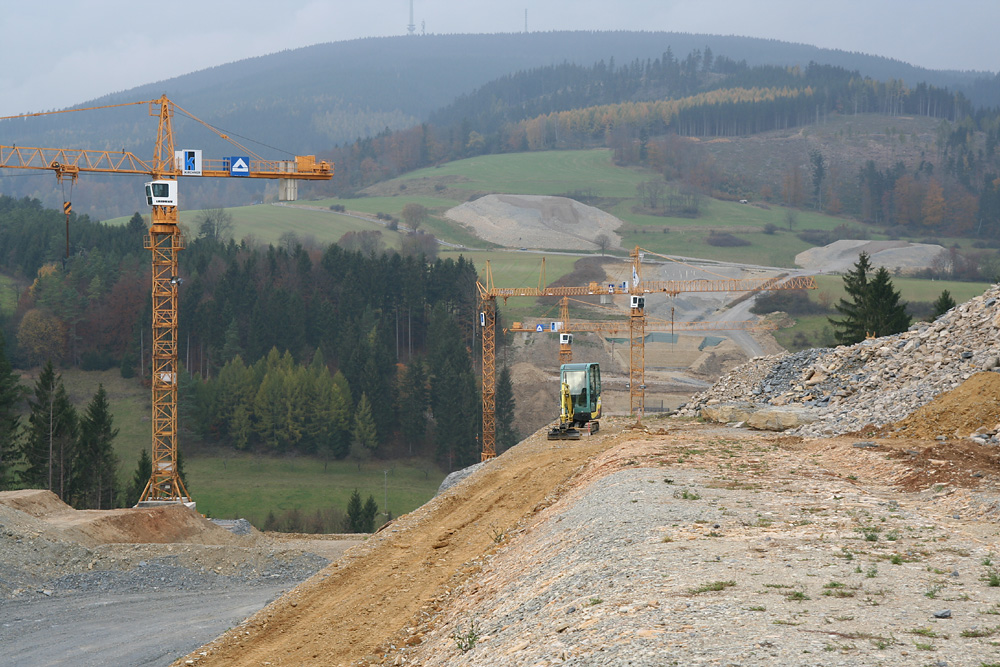
Earthworks for the future Theuern relief loops, view from the facility over the Truckenthal towards the Bleßberg

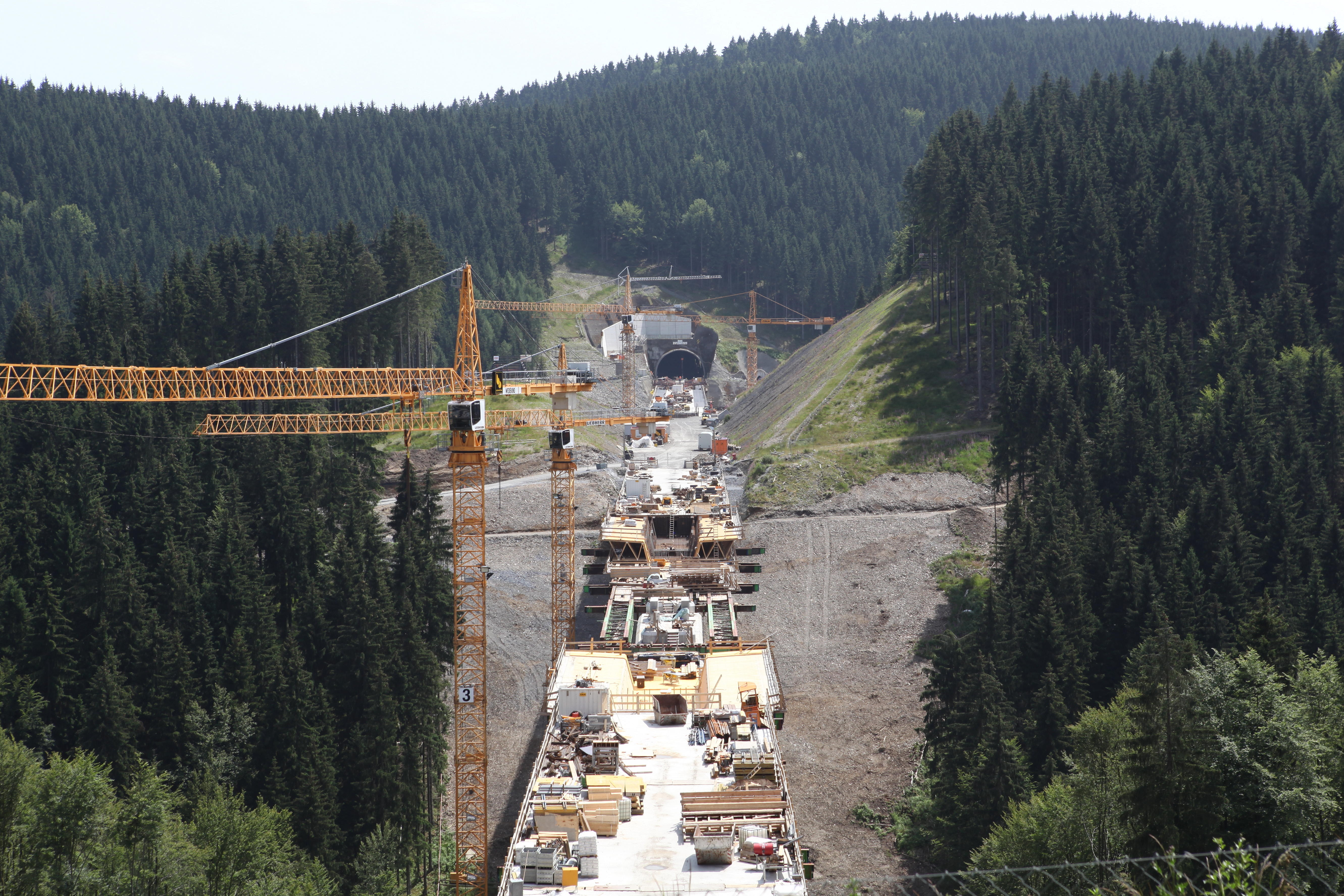
View in July 2012 to the highest point of the route from the southern portal of the Rehberg Tunnel towards the Dunkel Viaduct, the Kohlitschberg cutting, the Gruben Viaduct and the Goldberg Tunnel

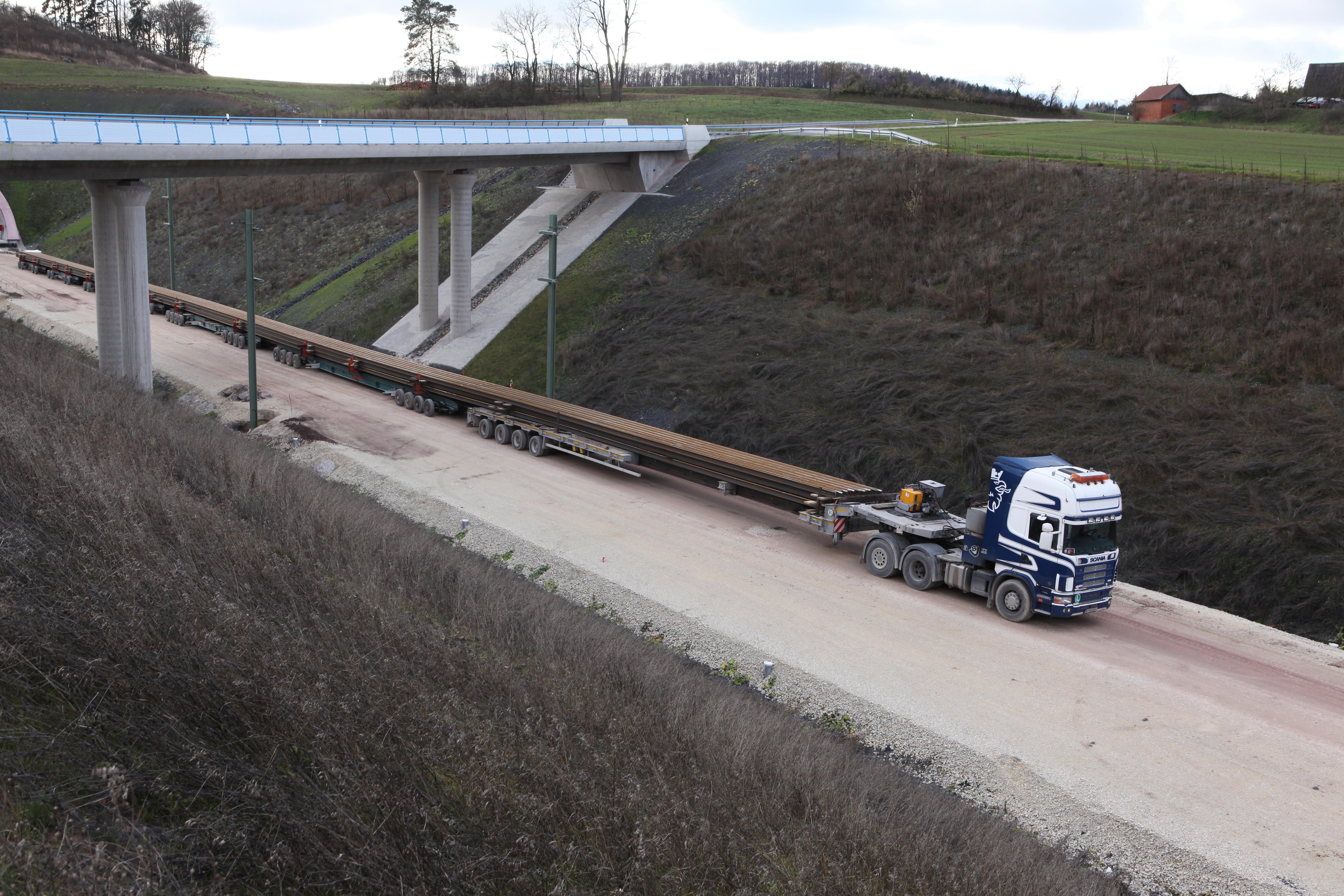
November 2013, rail track transport vehicle near Reitersberg Tunnel

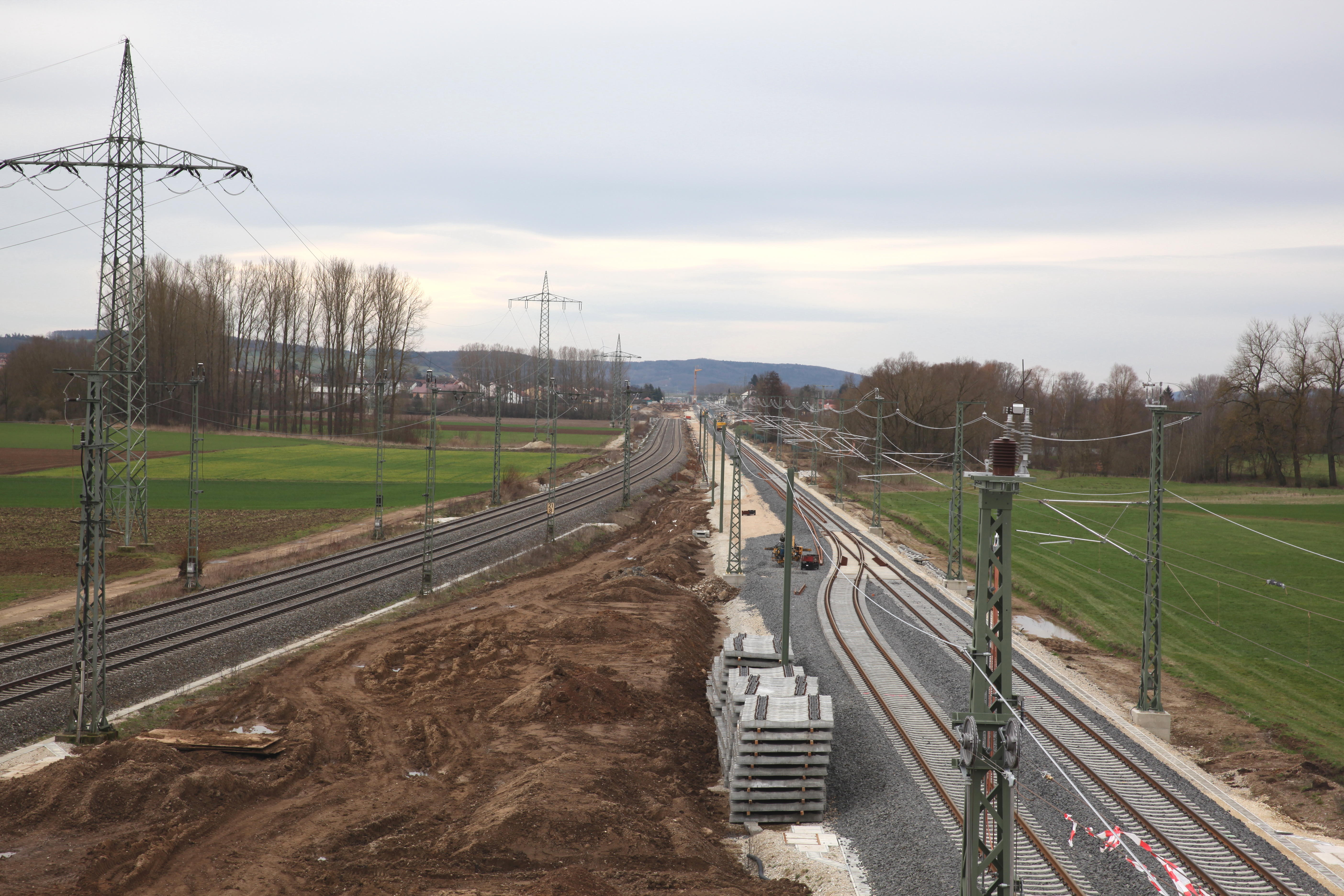
New line north of Ebensfeld, with a construction track leading towards Bamberg (2016)

With the ceremonial foundation of a bridge of the Rudisleben–Kirchheim state road over the future Eischleben relief loops, work on the new and upgraded line began on 16 April 1996. At the same time, the construction of the A71 (VDE Project No. 16) commenced. The first groundbreaking was carried out by the Federal Minister of Transport, Matthias Wissmann, the Thuringian Minister President, Bernhard Vogel and the Bavarian Minister of Economic Affairs, Otto Wiesheu, who gave speeches despite loud protests by environmentalists. Among the guests was Heinz Dürr, the head of DB at that time.

The construction work concentrated first on the 23 kilometre-long section "bundled" with the A 71 between Erfurt and Arnstadt. Construction of the almost 37 kilometre-long section between Erfurt and Ilmenau began in April 1996 and was almost completed in 2005. These included the Augustaburg, Behringen and Sandberg tunnels as well as the 1,100 metre-long Gera Viaduct at Ichtershausen and the 570 metre-long Wümbach Viaduct.

At the beginning of December 1998, a newspaper reported that the Federal Ministry of Transport had issued an order to stop work on the southern part of the new line so that the work program could be examined. The northern section that was being built along with the A 71 was not affected. After the Federal Ministry of Transport initially stopped pre-construction activities in July 1999 as a result of tight budgets, some work, mainly consisting of pre-construction work, was carried out in 2003 and 2004.

The construction of the approximately seven kilometre-long section integrating the new line into the Erfurt node began in 2001. In 2005, work started on the Stelzen intermediate access tunnel to the Bleßberg tunnel and approximately 20 kilometres of access roads were built in the Thuringian Forest. The first construction phase and the associated platforms were commissioned at Erfurt station in November 2005. At Coburg, work commenced at the end of 2005 on the Itz Viaduct, the neighbouring construction of the shell of the 221 metre-long tunnel of the Dörfles-Esbach connecting curve and a road crossing.

The project has been supervised and managed by DB ProjektBau since 2003. From 2000 to 2002, the project was managed by DB Projektverkehrbau, the planning company of Bahnbau Deutsche Einheit.

Construction began on the Grümpen Viaduct, including a 270-metre-long arch, in June 2006. This was followed by the commencement of the Froschgrundsee bridge with the same span in the autumn. At the end of 2006, contracts were awarded for the Truckenthal and Pöpelholz viaducts. In addition, construction of a two kilometre-long section of line connecting the Itz Viaduct towards Erfurt and the 4300 metre-long Bleßberg tunnel commenced. On 30 March 2008, the work on the Bleßberg tunnel lead to the discovery of a large limestone cave, the Bleiberberg cave.

Preparatory work started on the construction of the Ilm Viaduct in April/May 2007. At the end of May 2007, Deutsche Bahn issued a European-wide advertisement for the construction of a one-kilometre section of the Tragberg Tunnel and the construction of the Füllbach Bridge began. In the Coburg area, construction had been under way since September 2007 near Grub am Forst and Dörfles-Esbach, as well as the Froschgrundsee and Pöpelholz viaducts.

Work on the Müß Tunnel commenced on 29 February 2008. At the beginning of April 2008, Deutsche Bahn called tenders for the construction of the Masserberg, Rehberg, Kulch and Lichtenholz tunnels and the Dunkel, Reh and Mühlbach viaducts in September and November 2008 respectively. By the end of 2008, all major civil engineering projects and the construction of all "construction time-determining civil engineering works" would be awarded. At the end of January 2009, the DB advertised tenders for the section from track-kilometre 15.8 to 18.0 (near Coburg) and the first 1.8 kilometre of the Coburg southern connection, each including one tunnel. The invitation to tender for the integration of the line into the Erfurt node followed in July 2009. This was to be carried out in nine stages with train operations continuing and was scheduled to be completed in 2017.

According to Deutsche Bahn, the already built structures have already been included in the regular maintenance program, in order to ensure their functionality at the opening of the line. Early operations on the section between Erfurt and Ilmenau and further modifications of the project were proposed. Deutsche Bahn rejected early operations on the line. On the one hand, such regional services had not been ordered by the State of Thuringia; on the other hand, the safety and control technology that would have had to be installed would have become obsolete when the entire line was opened and would have had to be replaced. The costs would have exceeded the benefits.

In 2008, work was carried out on five bridges and tunnels of the new line. Höhnberg Tunnel was officially the last of the large projects to commence on the new line, with work starting on 30 September 2011.

Near Püchitz, around 20,000 pieces were found at the largest North Bavarian site of the Linear Pottery culture during archaeological excavations on the course of the new line up to mid-2010.

The permanent track and the overhead line on the northern section between Ilmenau and Erfurt would be built between August 2010 and November 2013, on the middle section between Coburg and Ilmenau between December 2012 and December 2015 and on the southern section between Bad Staffelstein and Coburg between January 2013 and December 2015. The contracts, which comprise the fixed track, including the foundations of the masts for the overhead line and wind and noise protection equipment, were let for the approximately 44 kilometre-long middle section for around €104 million and the approximately 22 kilometre-long southern section for around €60 million.

The construction of superstructure and catenary in the 32.5 kilometre-long section between Erfurt and Ilmenau officially began on 9 September 2010. €110 million was allocated for the two-year construction work.

Tunneling of the five still outstanding tunnels began during 2011 and the work in the Ebensfeld/Unterleiterbach area began in the first half of 2013.

Around 1,500 employees were employed on the new line at the end of 2011.

The last tunnel of the new line of the VDE 8 transport projects, the Höhnberg Tunnel was broken through on 25 August 2012.

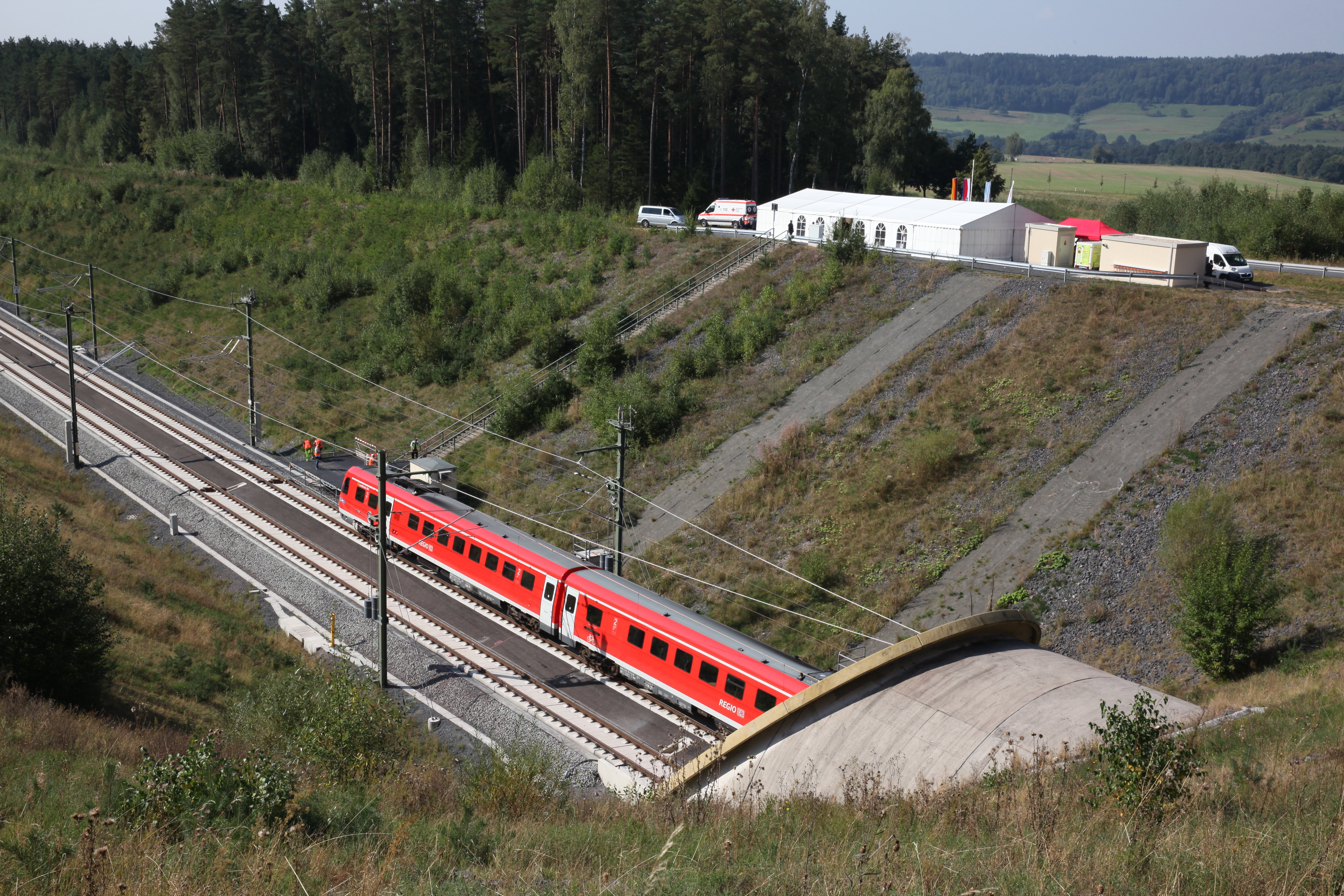
End of the Müß tunnel on 9 September 2016

In June 2013, the Dörfles-Esbach connecting curve was connected to the existing network, in order to be able to carry the rails for the construction of the line, among other things. The rails of the new line came from several large German track manufacturers and some were carried by goods trains on the lines from Coburg and Erfurt. At the end of November 2014 Deutsche Bahn announced that all 29 bridges on the new line had been completed.

In September 2014, the railway engineering equipment began working on the route, mainly to lay power cables. According to Deutsche Bahn AG, the work would be completed in September 2015. In 2015 and 2016, installation of rail equipment (in particular ETCS and telecommunications) would follow.

The construction work on the line was to be completed in early 2017 and trial operations were planned from mid-2017.

=== Commissioning ===
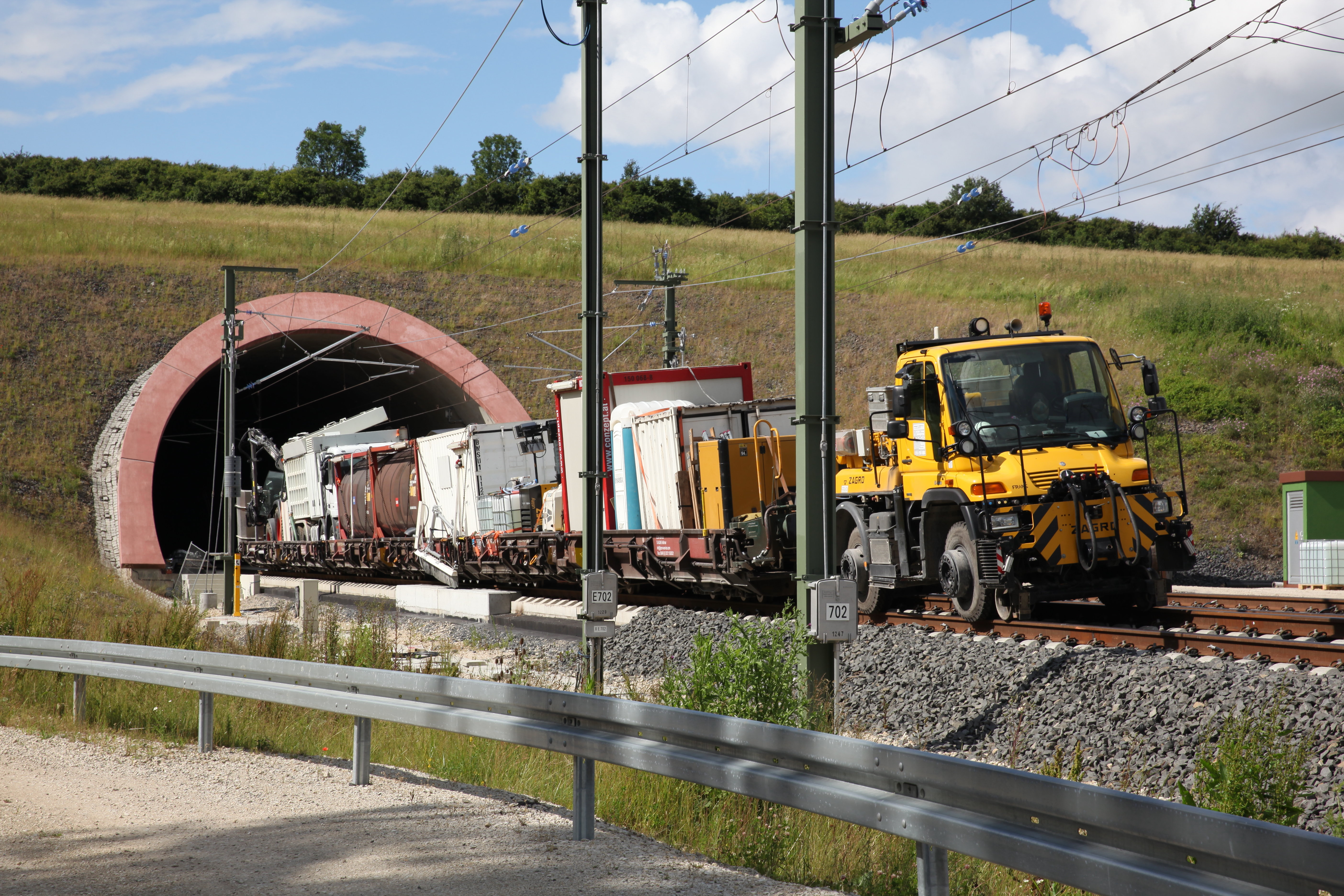
Tunnel cleaning train in front of the Eierberge tunnel, June 2016

In February 2016, sections of the new line were used to carry out radio reception tests at a top speed of 20 km/h. The first trials took place in May 2016. The permanent commissioning of the electrical overhead lines took place at the end of August 2016. The closing of the gap was formally celebrated on 9 September 2016.

The high-speed runs began on 17 October 2016. These ran initially at 160 km/h and the speed was afterwards increased in 20-km/h steps, ultimately to 330 km/h. The subsequent data analysis took several months. After the installation of control and signalling technology from April 2017, further operational tests, including ETCS test runs were carried out until the end of August. The first test run was carried out on 16 May 2017, at around 4 p.m., with a diesel Itino diesel multiple unit of Erfurter Bahn that was retrofitted with measuring technology and lighting to make video recordings of the total line for train drivers. The registration runs were carried out for a total of nine classes of Deutsche Bahn rolling stock.

Since the commissioning of the ETCS train control system in August, all journeys on the line have been controlled from the Leipzig and Munich operating centres. At the same time, a test program with scenarios for dispatchers, train drivers and maintenance staff began. This enabled drivers to acquire route knowledge during operations without passengers.

In March 2017, ten exercises were planned for the training of rescue workers. A big exercise took place in Reitersberg tunnel in March 2017. Emergency exercises on bridges and tunnels continued until November.

The first official journey was operated by an ICE Wittenberge on 16 June 2017 in the presence of railway chief Richard Lutz. On 30 August, another presentation trip took place between Erfurt and Bamberg, carrying the Federal Minister for Transport, Innovation and Technology, Alexander Dobrindt and DB board member, Berthold Huber in a modernised ICE 3.

From 22 August 2017 trial operations ran under ETCS train control.

In November 2017, Hauptbahnhofs (main stations) in Leipzig, Halle and Erfurt and the Erfurt–Leipzig/ Halle high-speed railway, which was already in operation, were completely blockaded so that measures in relation to the commissioning of the new line could be carried out.

The official opening celebrations were scheduled for 8 and 9 December 2017 in Berlin and Munich. An ICE premiere trip, from Munich to Berlin, was scheduled to start at noon on 8 December 2017 in Munich.

Since the timetable change in December 2017, up to 10,000 additional seats have been be offered daily on weekdays between Berlin and Munich, especially through the use of longer trains. A total of 17 million people will benefit from shorter travel times and new direct connections.

==== Accidents ====
- On 24 July 2008, the arch of the Truckenthal Viaduct collapsed while under construction due to a technical defect in an auxiliary support. Nobody was hurt. The construction work was subsequently discontinued, a column including an arch section was demolished on 28 January 2009 and then removed.
- During the building of the Ilm Viaduct on 1 September 2008, a construction worker was killed and three were injured (in some cases badly) as scaffolding with a reinforced cage collapsed during an incremental launch.

=== Outlook ===
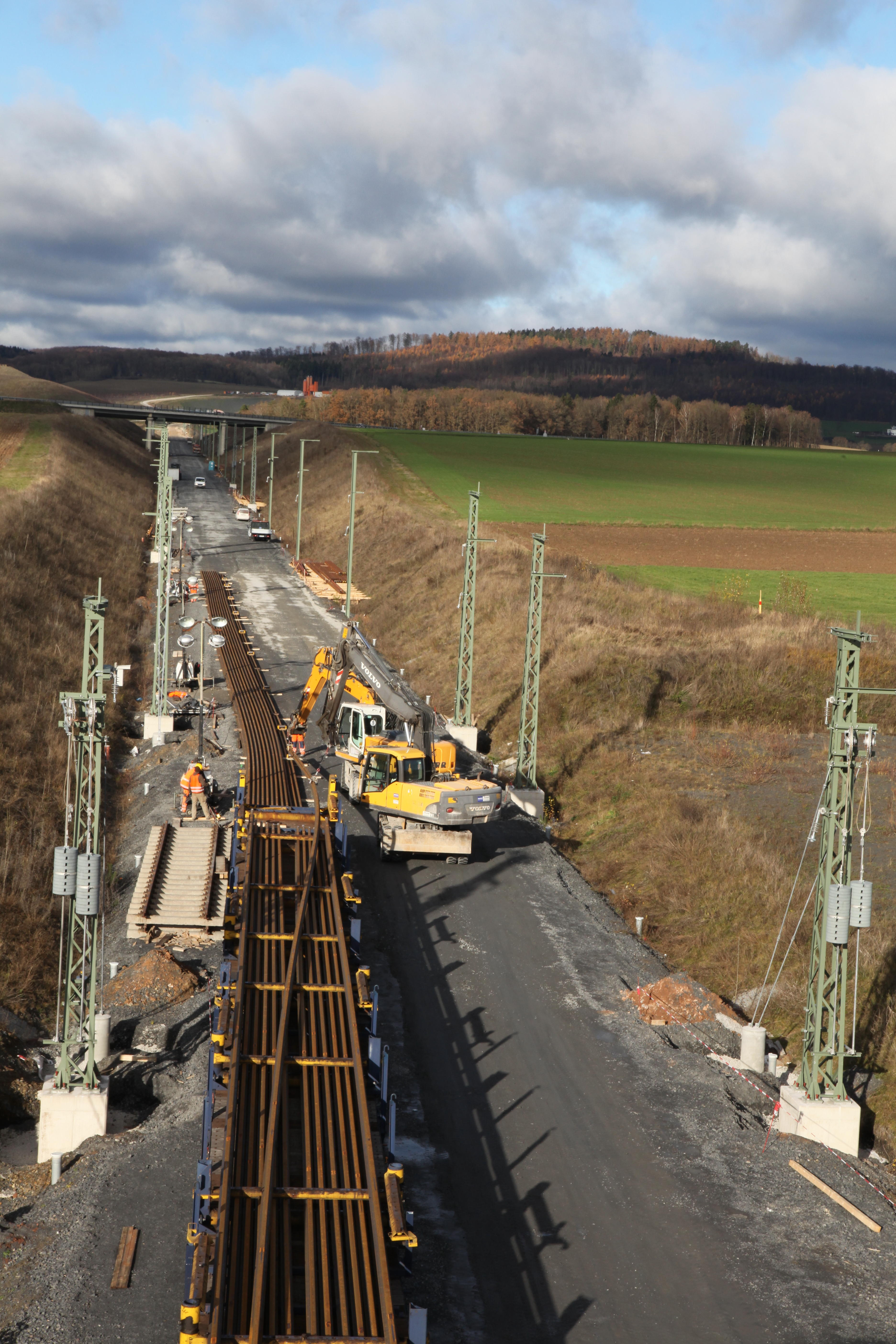
Unloading of long sections of rail at Coburg, November 2013

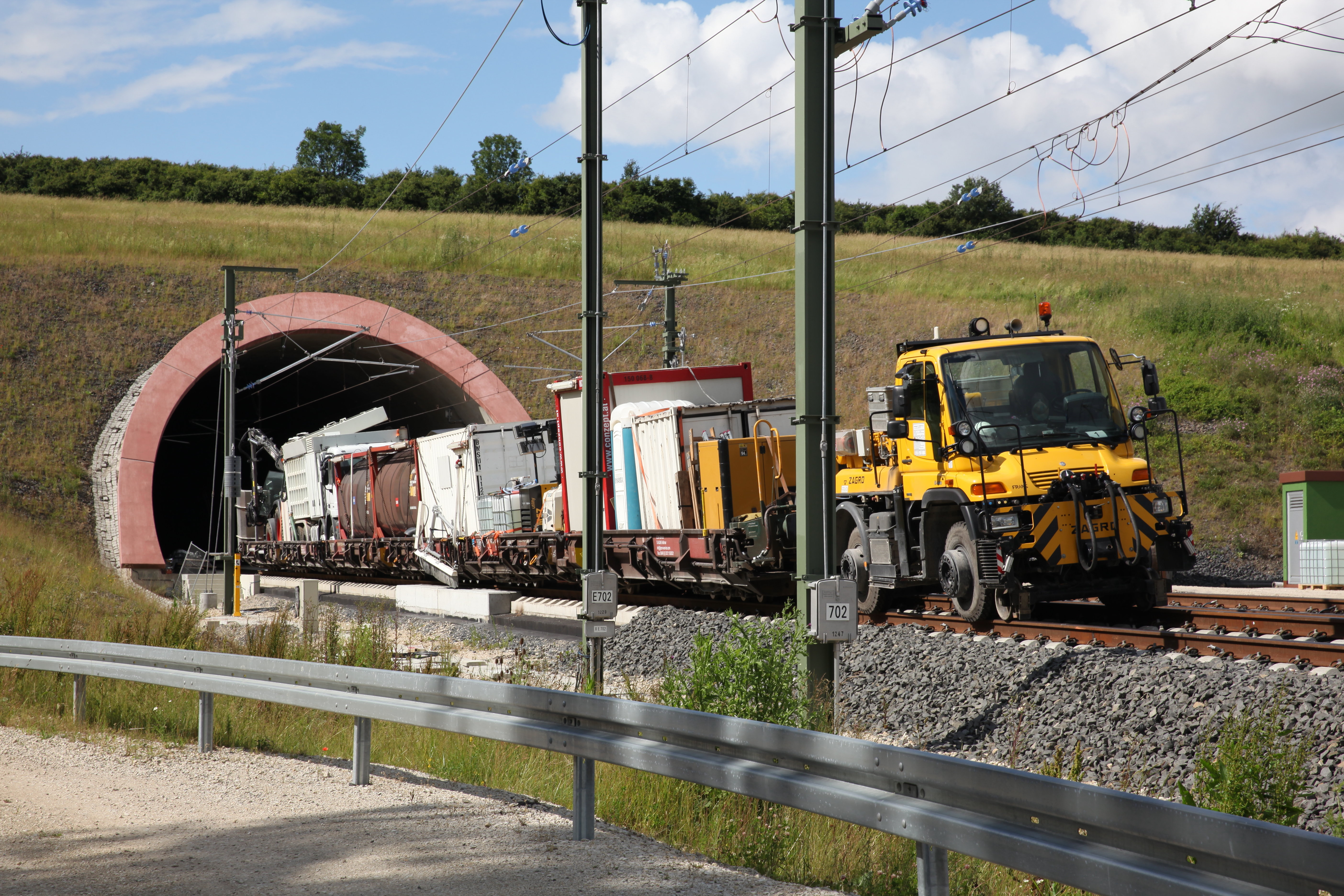
Tunnel cleaning train in front of the Eierberge tunnel, June 2016

The planned date of commissioning has been postponed several times. Thus, in July 1997, the commissioning of the new line was still expected in 2004. In December 2006, the Federal Government and Deutsche Bahn AG announced that the new line would be completed in 2016. In May 2006, the opening year was given as 2020 in a response to a parliamentary question from the Green Party, although the Federal Minister of Transport Wolfgang Tiefensee indicated at the opening of the Nürnberg-Ingolstadt high-speed line, that the line would be opened in 2016/2017. At the end of 2007 the Süddeutsche Zeitung reported that the line would not be completed until 2041. Later, it became known that 2041 had been used in a meeting of the board of directors to refer to the completion date of the upgraded line between Fürth and Ebensfeld. The new line is still planned to be completed by 2017 at the latest. Commissioning is now scheduled for the timetable change on 8 December 2017. According to information from mid-2015, this date is tight, but it can be kept. €29 million were provided for the new line from the Konjunkturpaket I ("stimulus package I"). In December 2006, a parliamentary support group was founded called Vollendung des Verkehrsprojektes Deutsche Einheit Nr. 8 ("Completion of German Unity transport project No. 8"), comprising over twenty Bundestag deputies. The parliamentarians were keen to accelerate the completion of the line. In April 2007, Transport Minister Tiefensee confirmed with the support group that the line would be completed by 2016, but in May 2008 the parliamentarians announced 2017 as the completion date in a press release.

The symbolic closing of the gap was celebrated on 9 September 2016. High-speed runs were due to begin on 17 October 2016. Trials will begin at 160 km/h and will be increased in 20-km/h increments until ultimately 330 km/h (210 mph) is achieved. The runs will take about three weeks and the data will be evaluated over several months.

Further operational testing, acceptance and approval are to take place in 2017 so that regular services can begin at the timetable change in December 2017. According to Deutsche Bahn, the possible building technology for the fastest possible realisation of the line were exhausted. An additional base of works in the cente of the line would not have resulted in a significantly earlier commissioning.

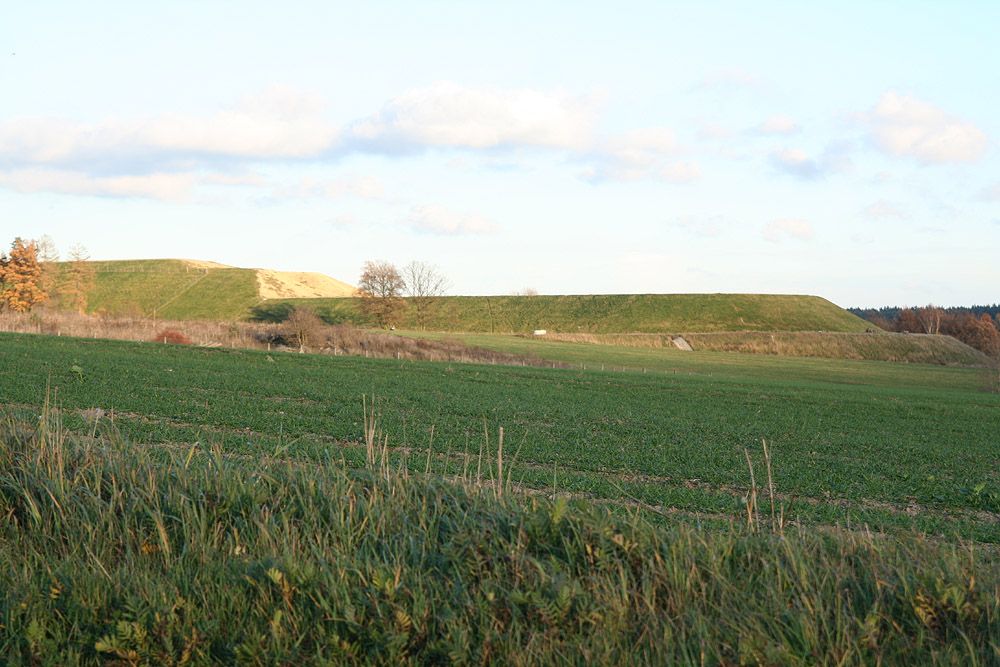
This is the end of the completed earthworks at Langewiesen in 2006 at the Ilm Viaduct.

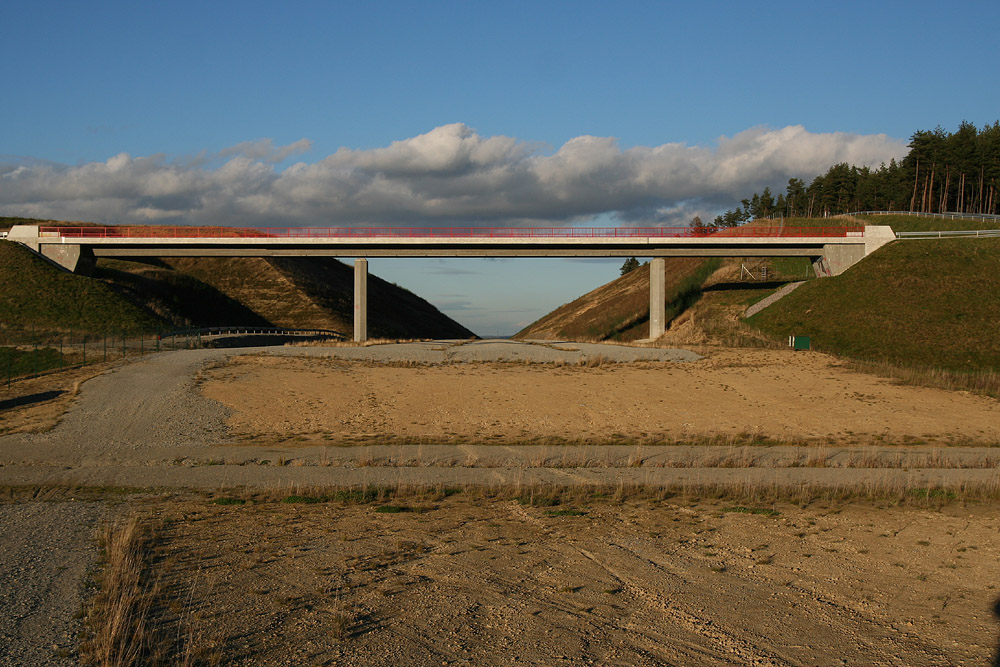
Future Ilmenau-Wolfsberg overtaking facility (November 2006)

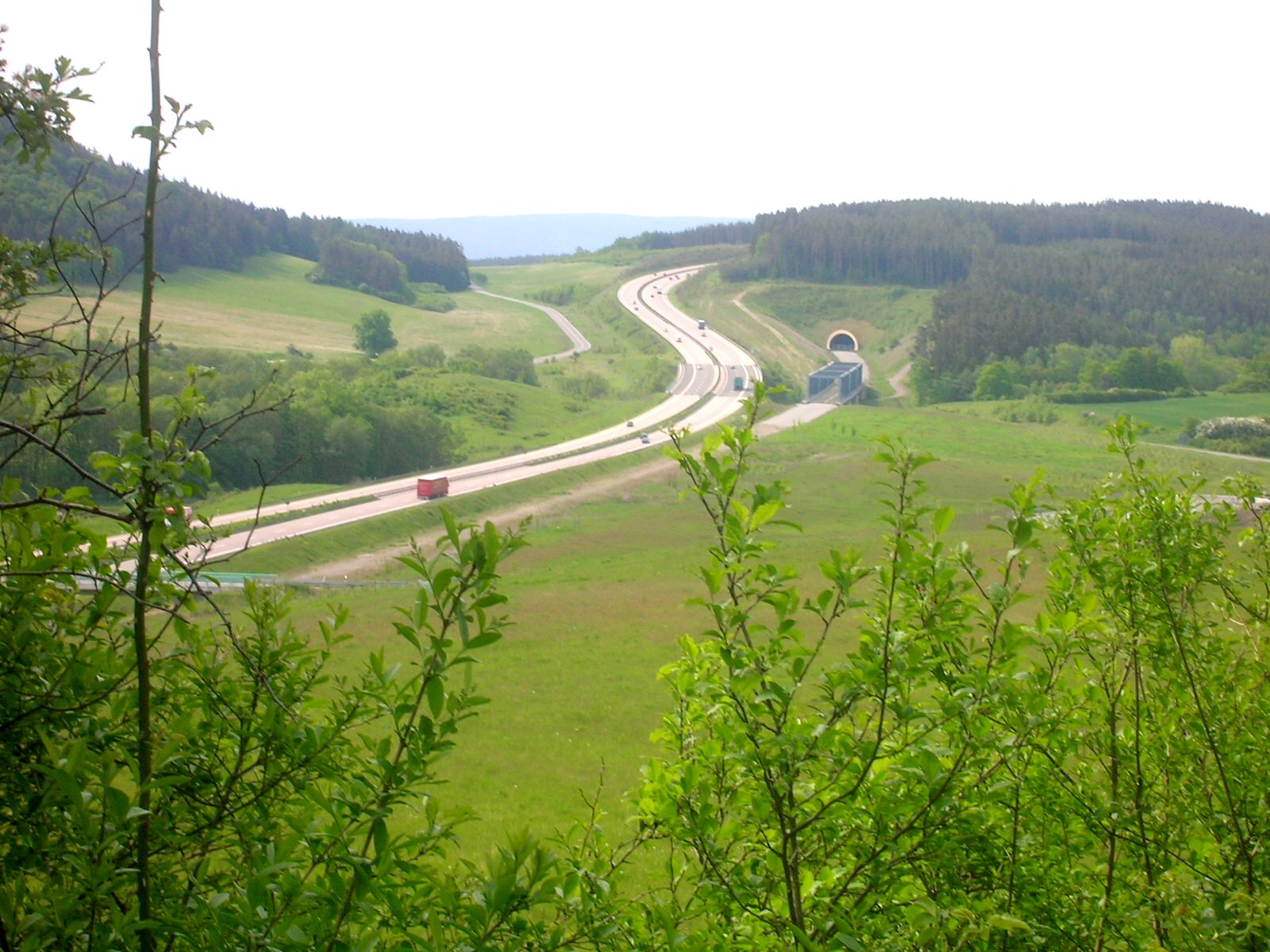
Autobahn A 71 and new line in the valley of the Wipfra, in the background is the northern entrance of the Sandberg Tunnel

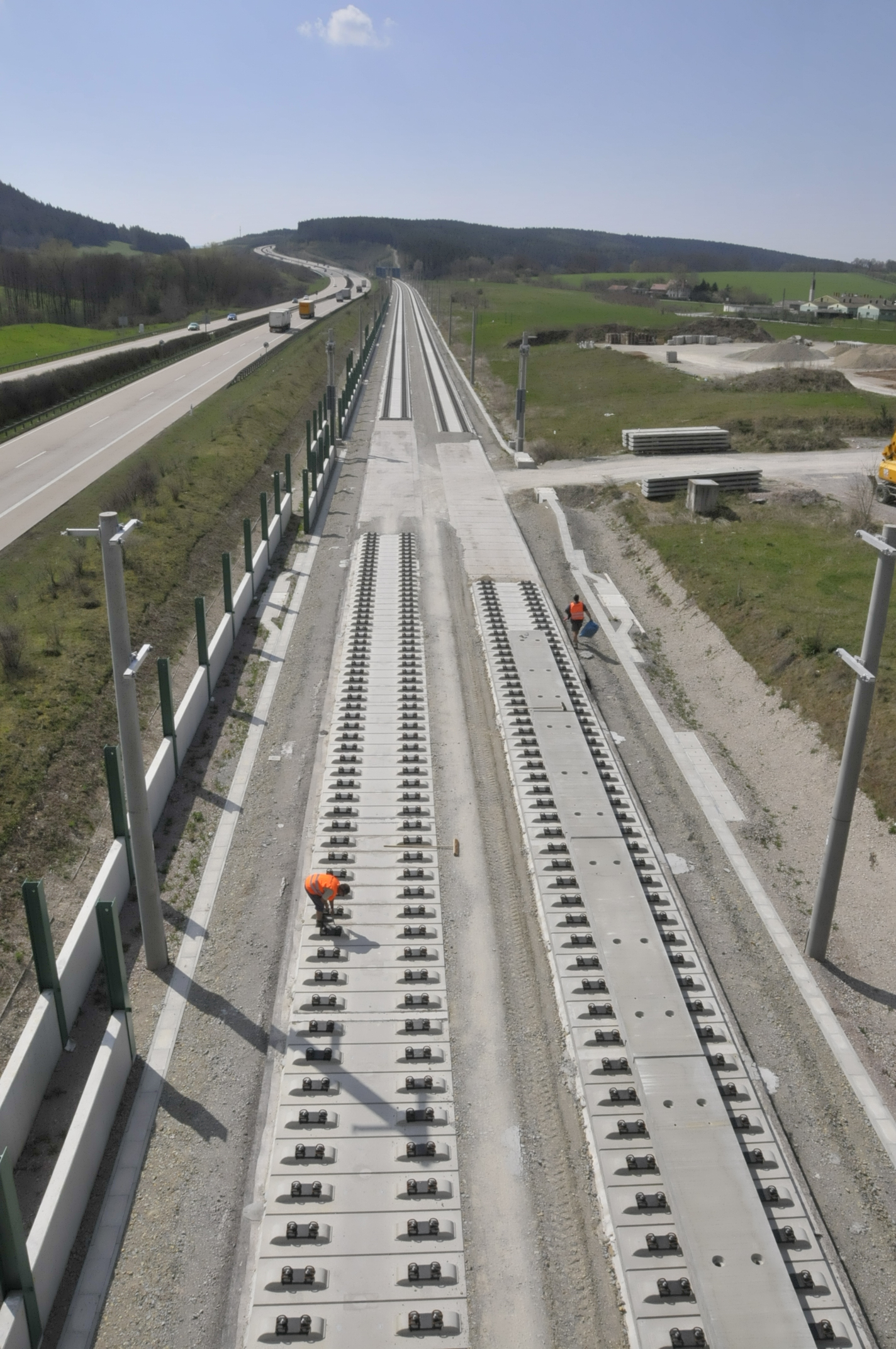
New line in the valley of the Wipfra in April 2013

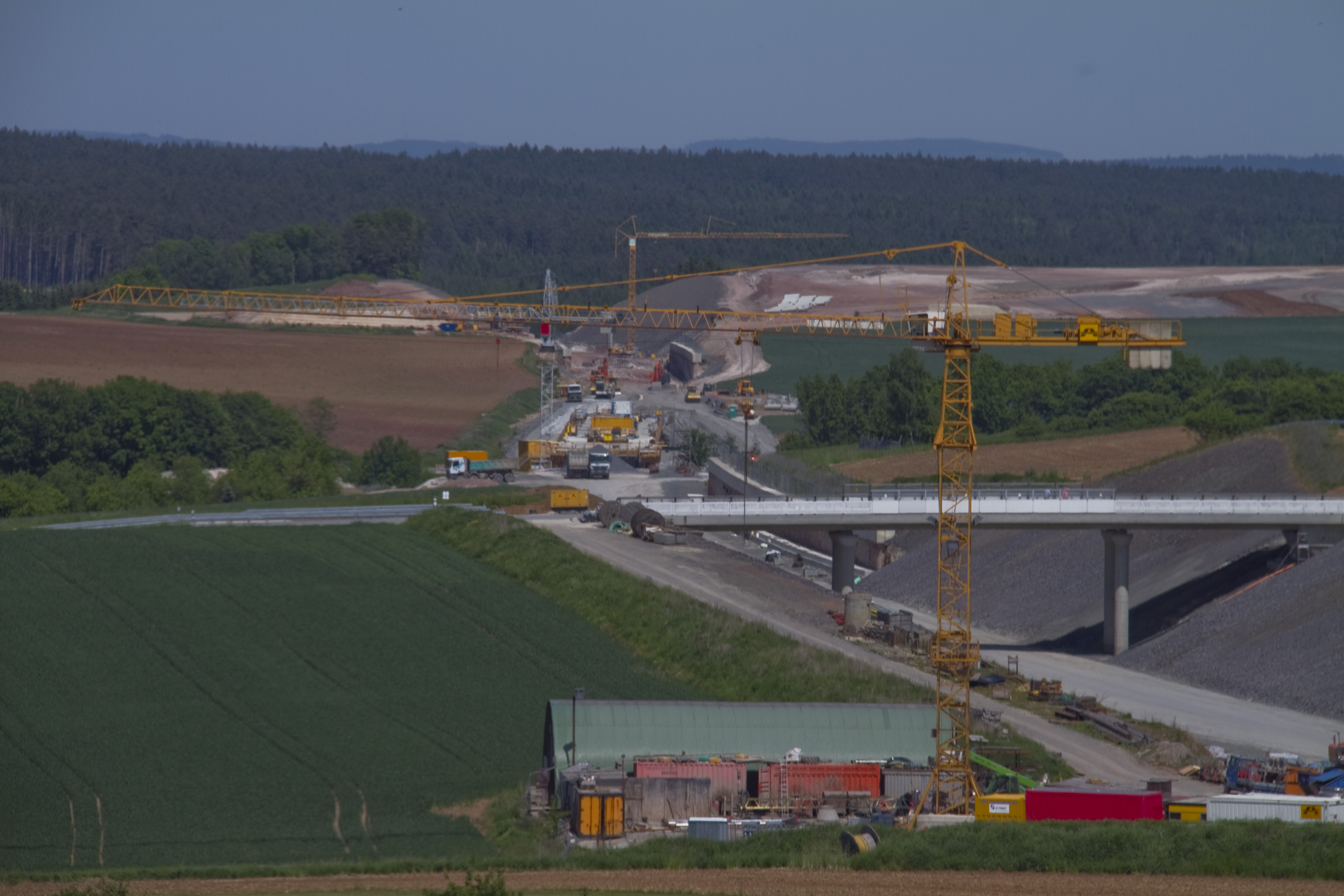
Section of the line between Lichtenholz Tunnel and the Mühlbach bridge

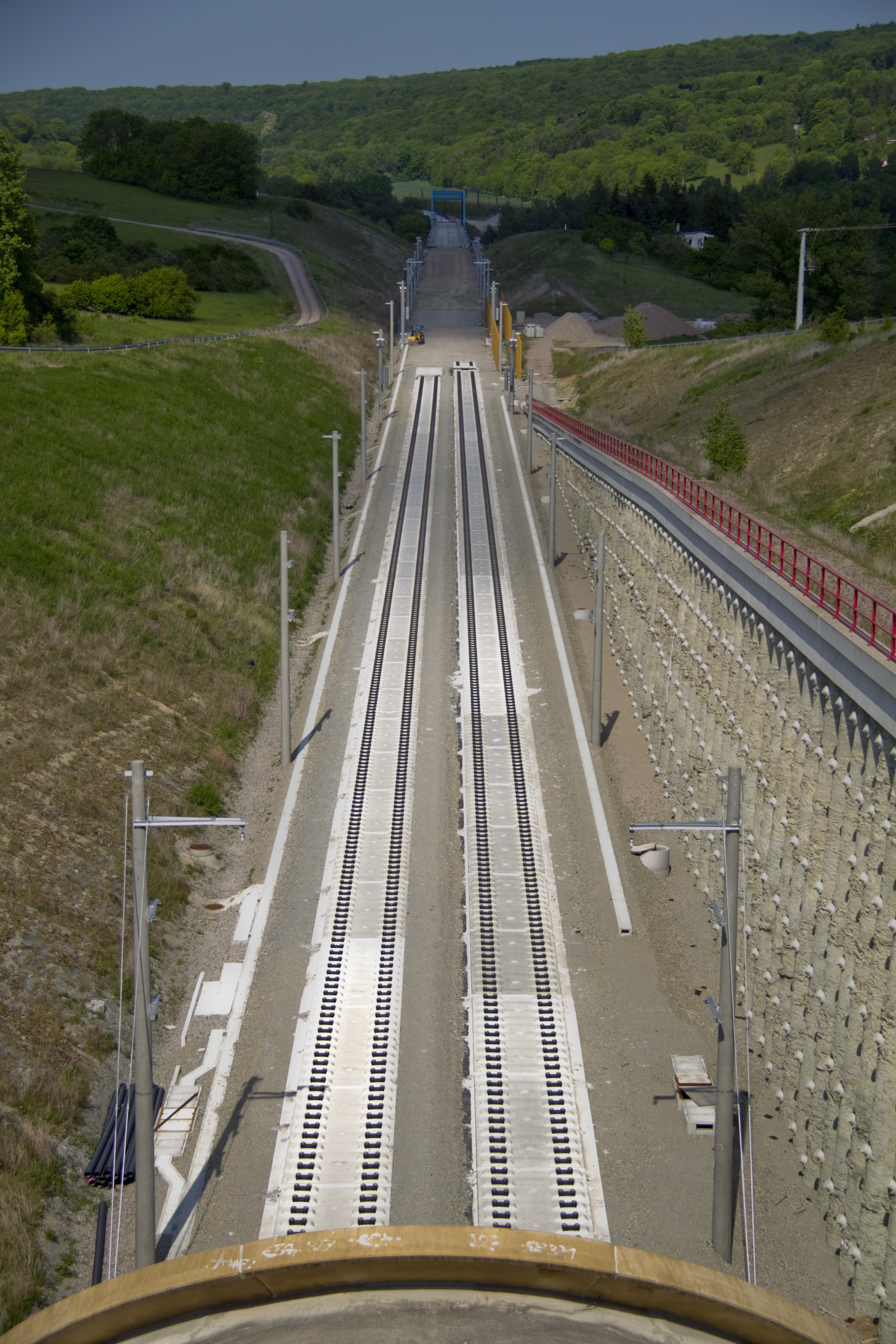
Section of the line between Augustaburg Tunnel and Gera Viaduct at Bischleben

=== Operations ===
As a result of the overall project including the newly built line and the upgraded line, the volume of passenger traffic is expected to increase by about 3.1 million trips per year and freight traffic is expected to increase by 2.9 billion tonne-kilometres.

==== Passenger traffic ====
The following passenger services are to operate via the new line:

- Berlin–Halle–Erfurt–Nuremberg–Munich (line 28.1, every two hours in hour 1)
- (north Germany–) Berlin–Leipzig–Erfurt–Nuremberg–Munich (line 28.2, every two hours in hour 2)
- Berlin–Halle–Erfurt–Nuremberg–Munich (ICE Sprinter line 29, three train pairs per day)

In regional transport, a Regional-Express service is to be established running over the new line on the Nuremberg–Coburg–Sonneberg (state border) route. Up to seven train pairs per day are foreseen.

Between Nuremberg and Erfurt the journey time of three hours (2014) will be shortened to about an hour. The travel times between Berlin/Leipzig/Dresden and Nuremberg/Munich will be shortened by about one and a half to two hours during the same period.

A node of the clock-face timetable is to be established at Erfurt station. Trains will be scheduled to arrive and depart every hour between the minutes of 24 and 36 and regional services will be scheduled to arrive and depart between the minutes of 16 and 44. With the start of passenger services on the new line, Naumburg, Jena, Saalfeld and Lichtenfels will lose their long-distance services.

==== Freight traffic ====
According to data from 2016, DB Cargo expects to have sufficient ETCS-equipped locomotives to be able to run freight traffic on the high-speed line. A forecast then expects a maximum of 20 freight train pairs per day; with an upgrade of the existing stretch to Erlangen to four tracks, it would be able to run 30 freight train pairs per day. From 2025, 60 freight trains would operate daily over the new line. 140 freight trains are to be operated over the existing line ("Saalbahn"). For a freight train from Halle (Saale) to Nuremberg, the price for operating a train will be €2180 via the new line and €985 via the current line (as of 2016). The route over the high-speed line is 30 kilometres shorter and less steep (a maximum grade of 2.0% instead of 2.7%).

=== Technology ===
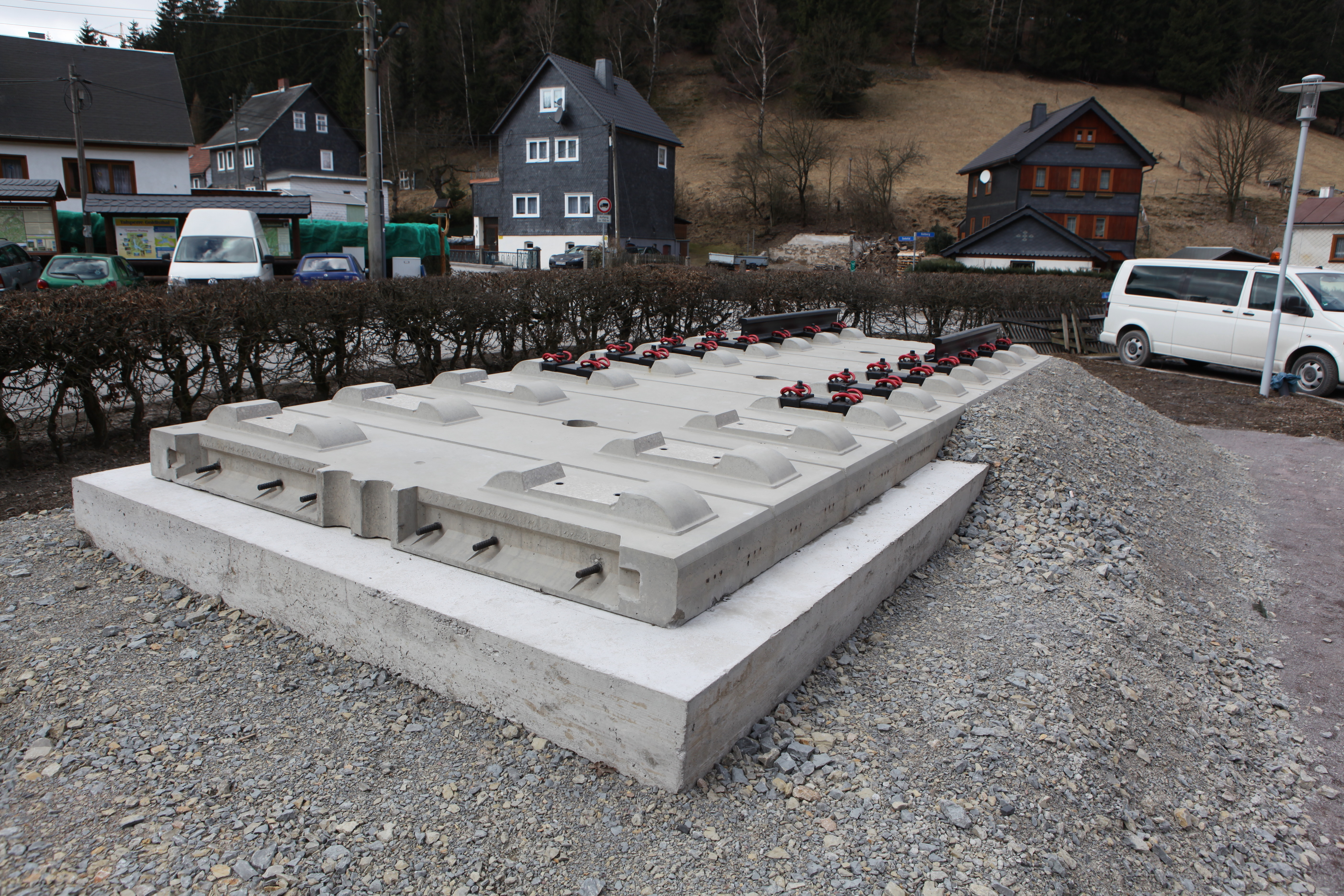
Bögl slab track system at the Goldisthal information centre

The high-speed is intended exclusively for electric traction and is equipped with class Re 330 overhead line.

The new line will be built using slab track, although overtaking tracks and connections to the existing network are being built with conventional ballast. The distance between track centres will be 4.70 metre and the planning width of a straight section of track is 13.30 metres. In the Thuringian section of the line, the track distance was adjusted to 4.50 metre in a change of plans in 1998. The planning width was reduced to 12.10 metres and the cross-section of the tunnel was reduced from 101 to 92 square metres. The additional cost of maintaining the larger track distances in Bavaria was estimated by the Federal Audit Office in 2014 to be at least €35 million. The Federal Railway Authority (Eisenbahn-Bundesamt—EBA) stated that in Bavaria, in contrast to Thuringia, changes to the planning approval decisions would have led to a risk of third-party objections. The Federal Audit Office considered this to be inaccurate, since the reduction in the distance between the tracks in Bavaria would have reduced the extent to which the environment was affected. Near the Augustaburg tunnel, the track distance is reduced to 4.00 metres.

The track changes are designed for a branch speed of 130 km/h. The distances of the overtaking facilities were determined in a study conducted by the company and are measured according to the planned operating program.

The ETCS Level 2 is being deployed on the Ebensfeld–Erfurt–Halle/Leipzig route without trackside signals and with no signal-based fallback for the first time in Germany. An ETCS line centre for the high-speed line is planned in Unterleiterbach. It was still planned in 2014 to upgrade ETCS to Baseline 3. Meanwhile, (2015), it is planned to operate the line under the SRS 2.3.0 D and to upgrade the line to Baseline 3 later.

As a fallback to ETCS, an intermittent train control system (Punktförmige Zugbeeinflussung) was modelled, which would allow operations outside of stations with turnouts at speeds of up 160 km/h. Procedures were also developed for dealing with a malfunctioning GSM-R Base transceiver station, so that trains can be run through.

Various solutions were investigated for the realisation of the ban on passenger and freight trains operating through tunnels at the same time and a special system was conceived, which transmits permissions at the entrance gateways to tunnels, as long as certain criteria are met. For this purpose, configuration data (e.g. tunnel areas) and rules for permissible and impermissible adjustments as well as train categories, which have different characteristics (e.g. axle pattern and ETCS train category), have been developed. A corresponding system was in the final phase of development in the middle of 2015.

26 GSM-R base transceiver stations and 31 repeaters are provided for voice and data communication.

The route is part of the trans-European high-speed railway network as defined in the Technical Specification for Interoperability. The route is to be controlled by seven electronic interlockings that are remotely controlled from signalling control centres in Munich and Leipzig. In 2014, the Federal Audit Office criticised the fact that the provision of €54 million for the signaling technology of the line had been made on the basis of an outdated operating program from 1995.

For approximately 53 km kilometers the line run in the open, usually on embankments (in the Main valley) or in cuttings. The height of the embankments is limited to 15 metres and the depth of the cuttings is limited to 20 metres (under DB Directive 836). Bridges and tunnels are built where these limits cannot be met. According to the introduction of 1997 EBA Directive Anforderungen des Katastrophenschutzes an den Bau und den Betrieb von Eisenbahntunneln ("requirements of disaster relief for the construction and operation of railway tunnels), railway tunnels that are at least 1000 metres long am are used in mixed operation of passenger trains and freight trains must be operated as two separate single-track tubes. In coordination with the Federal Government, the states, the EBA and Deutsche Bahn, a concept was developed for the high-speed line with two tracks running through single tunnels, which allows a mixed train operation to be carried out on the line. The ETCS train safety system that has been used since 1997 prohibits the operation of passenger and freight trains together as a fail-safe. According to the Federal Audit Office in 2014, it is not clear how this ban on trains meeting in tunnels should be implemented. Where necessary, measures mitigating tunnel boom are also built in the portal area.

Two new traction power lines are used to supply power to the line (110 kV). The 23.3 kilometre-long southern line is to branch off at Wörlsdorf from the existing Nuremberg–Weimar line and end at the new Roth substation at the north portal of the Müß tunnel near Welchendorf in Thuringia. The 21 kilometre-long northern line leads from the new Eischleben substation to the Wolfsberg substation. Over a length of about 4.4 kilometres, the railway power line is carried through the Wipfra valley on 13 masts of a 380 kV transmission line, which runs from the Vieselbach substation to the Altenfeld substation. This eliminated the need for 15 railway power line masts. For energy supply and data transmission, moreover, there are approximately 1,200 km of cable.

The 22 tunnels (ca. 40 km) are equipped with, among other things, safety lighting, electrical equipment (power supply boxes) and test equipment for the overhead line voltage. The line's technical equipment was commissioned in December 2013.

==== Safety ====
In an "event in the tunnel", about 700 rescue workers from all districts along the route (of which far more than half are volunteers) are to be alerted, regardless of the exact incident. The only professional fire brigade is in Erfurt. The accesses to emergency exits are to be cleared of snow in winter.

== Nuremberg–Ebensfeld upgraded line ==
Nuremberg–Ebensfeld upgraded line

Overview
- Native name: Ausbaustrecke Nürnberg–Ebensfeld
- Line number: 5900 (Nuremberg–Eltersdorf); 5919 (Eltersdorf–Leipzig)
- Locale: Bavaria, Germany
- Termini: Nuremberg Hbf; Ebensfeld

Technical
- Line length: 83 km (52 mi)
- Track gauge: 1,435 mm (4 ft 8 1/2 in) standard gauge
- Electrification: 15 kV/16.7 Hz AC overhead catenary
- Operating speed: 230 km/h (142.9 mph) (maximum)

The 83 km long line is part of the existing railway highway circuit from Nuremberg via Saalfeld to Halle and is being upgraded to a maximum speed up to 230 km/h (143 mph) trains.

Between Nuremberg and Erlangen it is upgraded for up to 160 km/h (99 mph), between Erlangen and Ebensfeld for up to 230 km/h (143 mph). For about 41 kilometres, the route will be operable at 230 km/h (143 mph), for about ten kilometres at 200 km/h (124 mph) and otherwise at 160 km/h (99 mph).

=== Situation prior to the upgrade ===
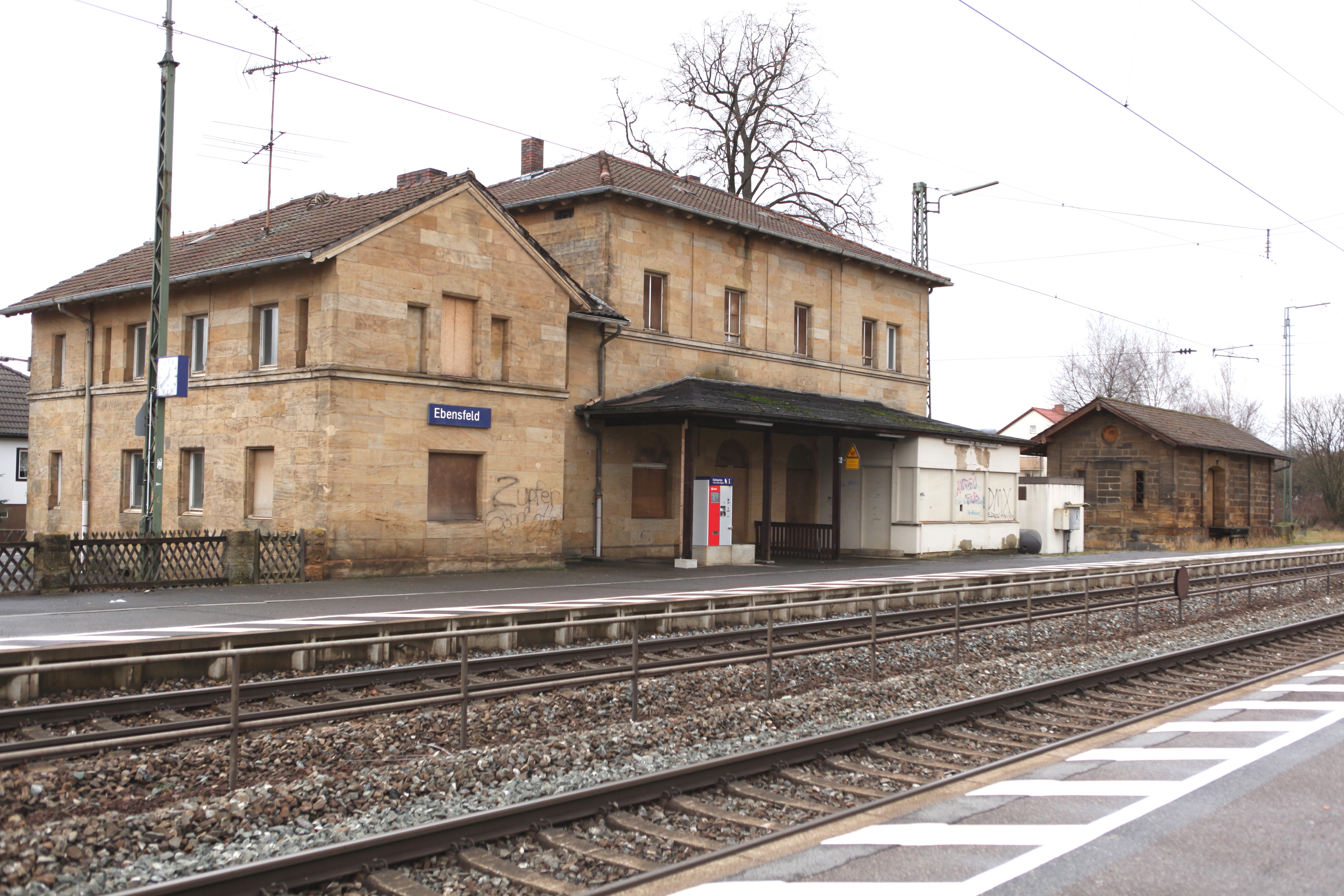
The building, which was commissioned in 1846 and demolished in 2015, was a listed building in Ebensfeld

In the section of line between Fürth and Bamberg, an Intercity-Express, a Regional-Express and an S-Bahn run regularly (hourly in both directions). There are additional RE services every hour during the peak hours, resulting in a service every half hour. There is also an S-Bahn service to Forchheim every hour, so that all stops are served at least half-hourly between Nuremberg and Forchheim.

In the section between Bamberg and Ebensfeld an ICE, an RE (running as the Franken-Thüringen-Express) and a Regionalbahn (RB) service run hourly in both directions. The RE runs to Hof/Bayreuth on a two-hourly schedule, as do additional RE services on working days. Between Bamberg and Breitengussbach, agilis services run on the line every hour. In addition, about 60–70 freight trains run each day.

Operational restrictions particularly affect in the Fürth district. Trains to Würzburg cross the tracks of trains from Bamberg, trains to and from the Nuremberg marshalling yard cross the tracks of the trains from Nuremberg Hbf to Würzburg (and vice versa). Since the completion of the extension of four tracks on the Nuremberg-Fürth section, the situation in Fürth has eased somewhat.

At Breitengüßbach and Zapfendorf stations between Bamberg and Ebensfeld, the access to the platforms was over a passenger level crossing, which meant that when regional services stopped, the track next to the station building had to be blocked for the safety of passengers.

=== Planning ===
The project was included in the Federal Transport Plan (Bundesverkehrswegeplan) 1992.

Between Nuremberg and Ebensfeld, different route options were tested:

- four-track upgrade of the Nuremberg–Fürth–Bamberg–Lichtenfels line
- construction of a two-track line between Nuremberg and Großgründlach and upgrade the line between Großgründlach and Lichtenfels to four tracks
- a two-track line on the left (western) side of the Regnitz to Bamberg followed by an additional two tracks between Bamberg and Lichtenfels
- a new two-track line through Franconian Switzerland from the Erlangen area to Hochstadt-Marktzeuln

On 30 March 1993, the Bavarian State Ministry for Land Development and Environmental Issues initiated the land-use planning process. In mid-1993 the spatial planning procedure was completed and the upgrade of the line to four tracks between Nuremberg and Ebensfeld was identified as the most favourable solution. The first planning approval procedures were initiated in 1993. According to the planning status of mid-1993, the planning approval documents were expected to be available by October 1993 and the procedures were expected to continue until summer 1994. Construction approval was expected by autumn 1994 at the latest and the construction would then take five to six years. According to another source, all 13 planning approval procedures of the upgrade were initiated in 1996; four were resolved by April 1997.

The line between Nuremberg and Fürth will receive an additional two tracks, with a pair of tracks being assigned to the Nuremberg S-Bahn in the future. The 7.6 kilometre-long line will be able to be operated at up to 160 km/h. It will be possible to operate all four tracks in both directions and they will run directly to Nuremberg station. In addition to the four-track upgrade between Nuremberg and Fürth, there are several essentially local measures, in particular the elimination of level crossings.

At Nuremberg station, platforms have to be adapted for the S-Bahn. Between the Nuremberg marshalling yard and Eltersdorf, the construction of a 13 kilometre-long double-track freight line, including the 7,580 metre-long Pegnitz Tunnel between Fürth-Kronach and Nuremberg-Grossmarkt is proposed. This would mean that the level junction at Fürth Hauptbahnhof could be abolished.

North of Fürth, the S-Bahn to Eltersdorf branches off the existing line. There, the existing line, the S-Bahn and the new line to Nuremberg freight yard will meet at a grade-separated junction. Between Fürth Hbf and Eltersdorf, the line will therefore have two tracks, with a third track in Vach station. From Eltersdorf, the existing line towards Erlangen/Bamberg will be supplemented to its east with two more tracks that can be operated at up to 230 km/h. The line between Großgründlach and Bamberg will also be upgraded to four-tracks. The Nuremberg S-Bahn and freight traffic would use the two middle tracks. The planned two tunnels of the extension would have a total length of eight kilometres and there would also be two new viaducts with a total length of 400 metres.

The line on the section between Nuremberg and Bamberg meets the requirements of high-speed traffic as it is largely straight. It runs in the Regnitz valley almost in a straight line, particularly between Erlangen and Bamberg, and with curves with very large radii and can already be run largely at 160 km/h. Between Fürth and Erlangen, there are some sharper curves, mainly between Fürth and Fürth-Unterfarrnbach, and north of Vach station (the underpass of the A 73), and the speed is limited to 140 km/h.

The extension is divided into thirteen sections for planning purposes and the planning approvals processes were initiated between 1994 and 1996. At the beginning of 1996, two decisions were made. From the beginning of July 1999 until 2002, the planning was based on the order of the Federal Ministry of Transport. As a result of changes in the technical and legal framework, planning amendments were initiated as of March 2002. In December 2001, the Free State of Bavaria let a contract for the planning of the proposed S-Bahn.

The state of the planning for the southern planning assessment sections (Planfeststellungsabschnitten, PFA) is as follows:

- PFA 13 ("Nuremberg marshalling yard–Eltersdorf freight railway"): approval of the planning costs was put before the board of Deutsche Bahn AG for approval. The planning of the freight railway, including the approximately 7,580 metre-long Pegnitz Tunnel, was advertised Europe-wide on 21 August 2009.
- PFA 14 (the upgrade of the Nuremberg–Fürth line to four tracks): the section was planned and was opened in December 2010 (northern pair of tracks, line 5972 for the S-Bahn) and December 2011 (southern pair of tracks, line 5907). The newly built tracks are located on the (old) line 5900.
- PFA 15 ("Fürth curve"): The planning approval decision was issued in August 2007. The section was under construction from 2009 onwards. Completion was expected for 2013. However, due to a lack of connection to the rest of the network (PFA 16), it has not been possible to put it into operation.
- PFA 16 ("Fürth North", relocation of the S-Bahn): the plan was established in February 2014, but it has not been finalised. The originally planned commissioning at the end of 2011 could not be achieved due to the lack of planning approval. The city of Fürth had threatened a complaint against the plan. It refused to approval the relocation of the S-Bahn and demanded that the S-Bahn be bundled with the existing line.
- PFA 17 ("Erlangen"): The planning approval decision was issued in November 2009; the construction started in November 2011.
- PFA 18/19 (Forchheim/Eggolsheim): the planning approval process had been discontinued in 1996 and 1997, but the planning approval process resumed 2013. Planning approval for the 14 km-long section was given in January 2016.
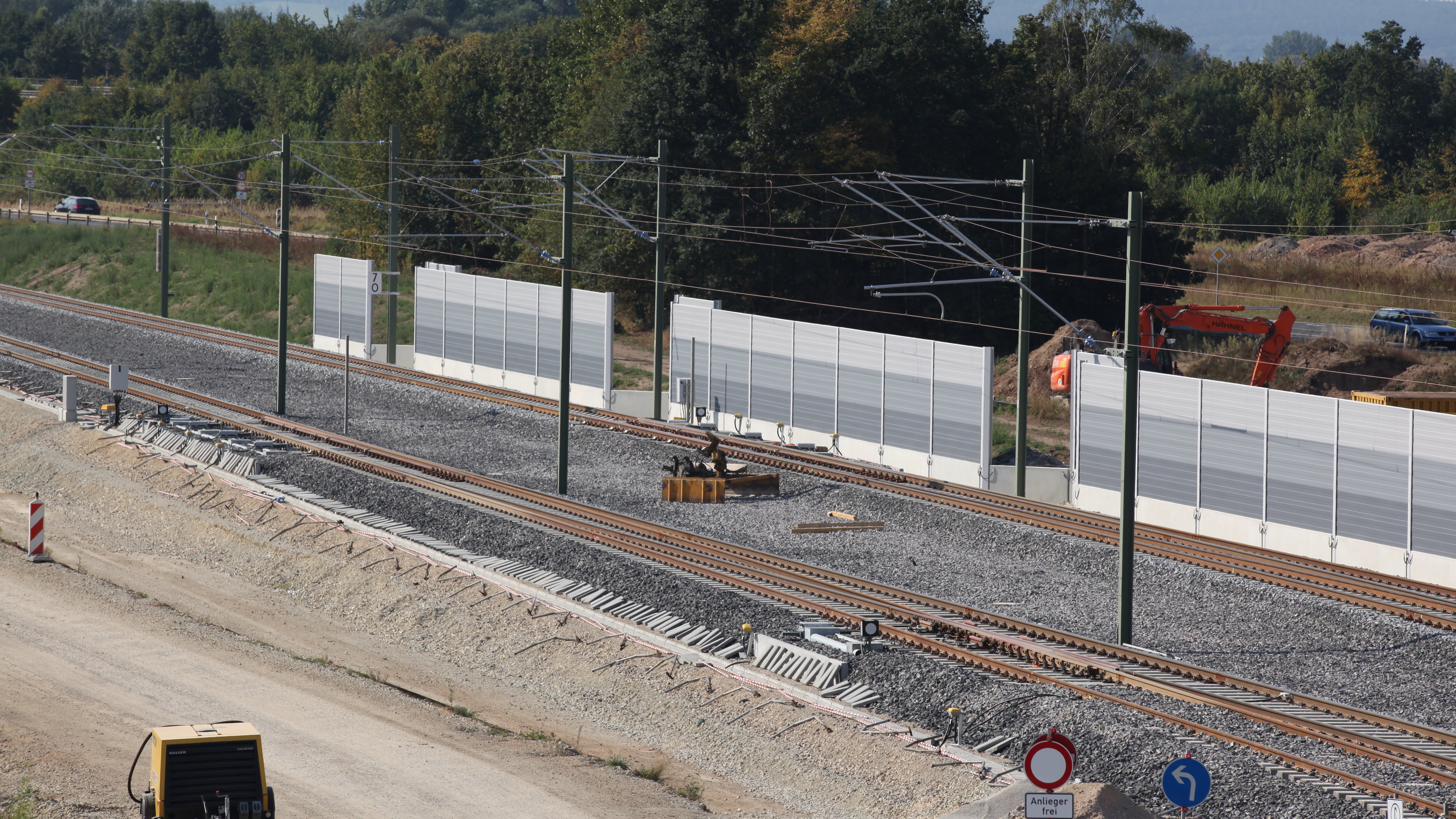
- Separation of the new line south of Breitengüßbach
  The planning approval procedure was presented in April 1996 and the report of the hearing was presented in November 1996 and the procedure was suspended for the planning phase section 23/24, from the northern town limits of Bamberg to the northern edge of Marktes Zapfendorf. It was continued between 2013 and 2015 with three changes in planning procedures and concluded by an approval on 30 July 2015. Construction work in section between Breitengüßbach (km 68.9+73) and Zapfendorf (km 77.7+07) began in 2015 and is due to be completed in late 2017 (status: February 2014). The corresponding building contract was awarded to Leonhardt Weiss & Co. KG in October 2015 for €145 million. The mainline was completely blockaded from 11 January to 4 September 2016. The cost of the substitute buses was about €3.5 million. The planning approval process also applied to changes at Nuremberg Hauptbahnhof.

A total of 220 kilometres tracks with 250 sets of points and 160 bridges are to be built or rebuilt. At 26 railway stations, platforms are to be replaced or adapted, 25 level crossings are to be closed and largely replaced by new overpasses and/or underpasses. Eleven level crossings had been eliminated by June 2007, and the planning or planning approval procedure had been initiated for nine level crossings.

The environmental measures on the upgraded line include measures to increase biodiversity in the Fürther Rednitzgrund (between Stadeln and Vach) and the provision of financial resources to the city of Erlangen for measures to develop water courses.

At the beginning of 1997, an upgrade for services up to 200 km/h was proposed. There would also be several overtaking loops.

=== Construction ===
In advance of the main projects, four bridges and the railway power supply have been renewed since 1996 in the area of the upgrade. Between 1998 and 2006, two substations were established.

Work began on the provision of four tracks between Nuremberg and Fürth in 2006. The third track was put into operation at the end of 2010 at the fourth track followed in November 2011.

The further development is to be carried out gradually in accordance with the plan and as finance becomes available. Total funds of €370 million have been provided for the upgrade between Nuremberg and Forchheim. Of this, approximately €200 million is provided for the S-Bahn. The upgrade of the 14 kilometre-long section between Forchheim and Eggolsheim, which was scheduled to be carried out between 2011 and 2015, is estimated to cost €190 million. The eight-kilometer section south of Forchheim (km 31.2 to 39.7) was allocated €115 million through a joint venture.

Construction work on the 16-kilometre-long section from south of Eltersdorf through Erlangen to Baiersdorf, began in November 2011. The section is being built in four sections and involves the rebuilding of various railway tracks and engineering structures.

The quadruplication of the section from Baiersdorf to Forchheim is to take place from 2016 to 2018, the extension to Neuses until 2022. Altogether this section is 13.5 kilometres-long. The new tracks will be built to the east of the existing tracks. This work will cost €300 million.

The quadruplication to Ebensfeld was expected to be completed by 2017, according to the planning goals of 2008. The federal government now expects (as of 2011) to complete the upgrade project (including for freight traffic) before 2025, with the delay being caused by a lack of finance.

The cost of planning approval section 25, between Zapfendorf (km 77.7+07) and Eierberge Tunnel (km 87.2+69), was finally established as €58,883,020 (net). Among other things, an overhauling facility with two relief loops will be built in Unterleiterbach. The work was due to be completed by the end of 2015.

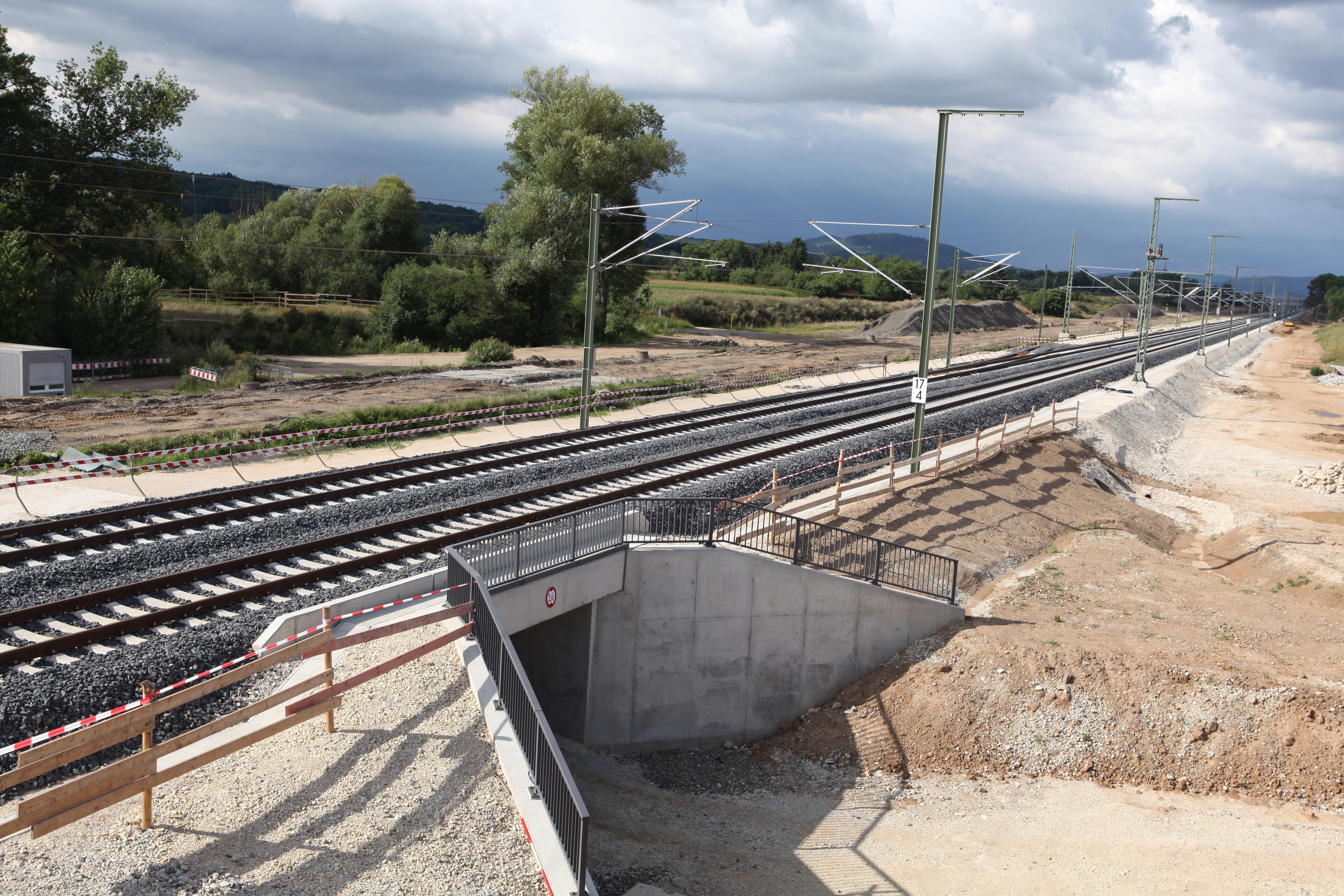
Unterleiterbach relief loops (July 2014)

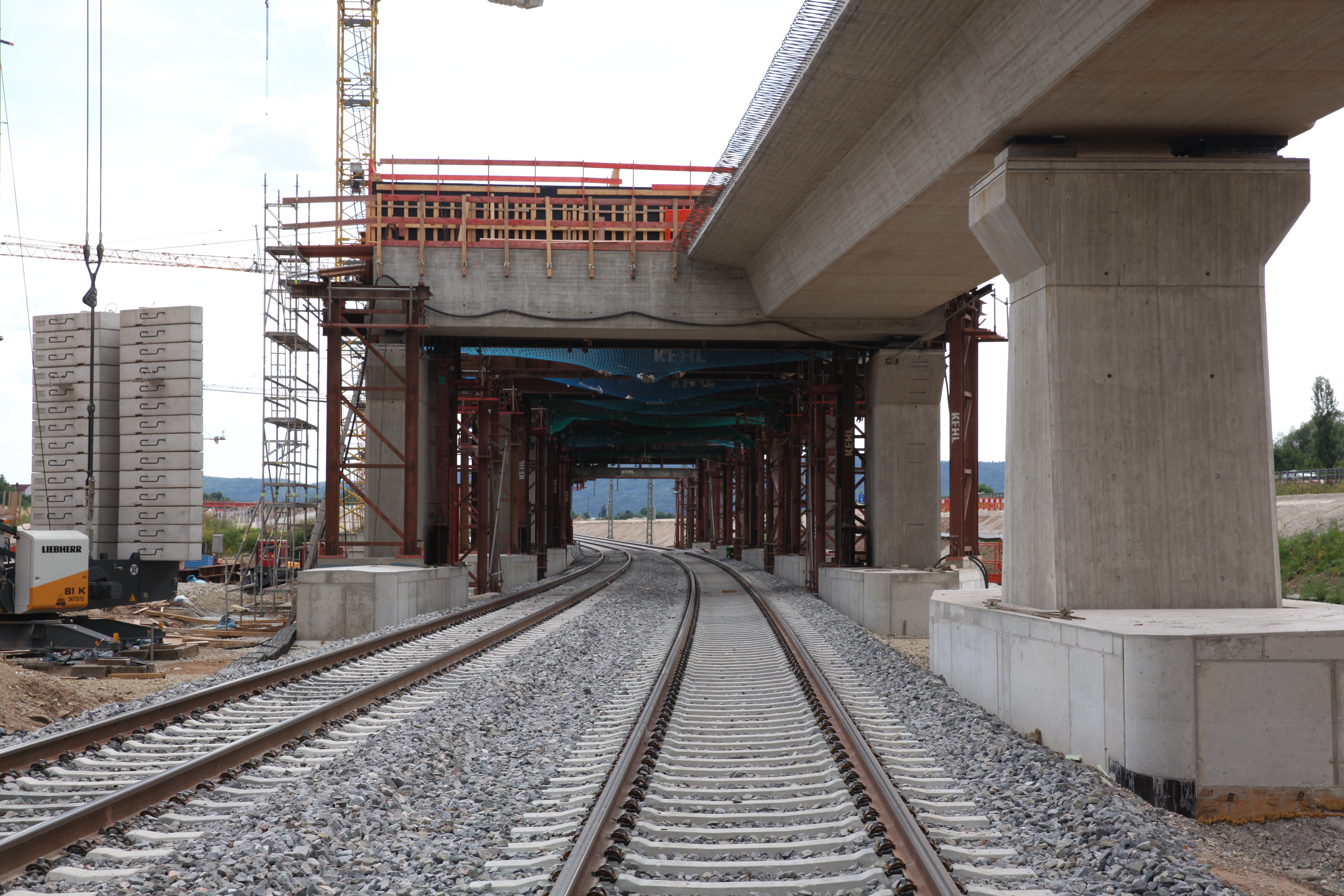
Unteroberndorf, flyover (July 2016)

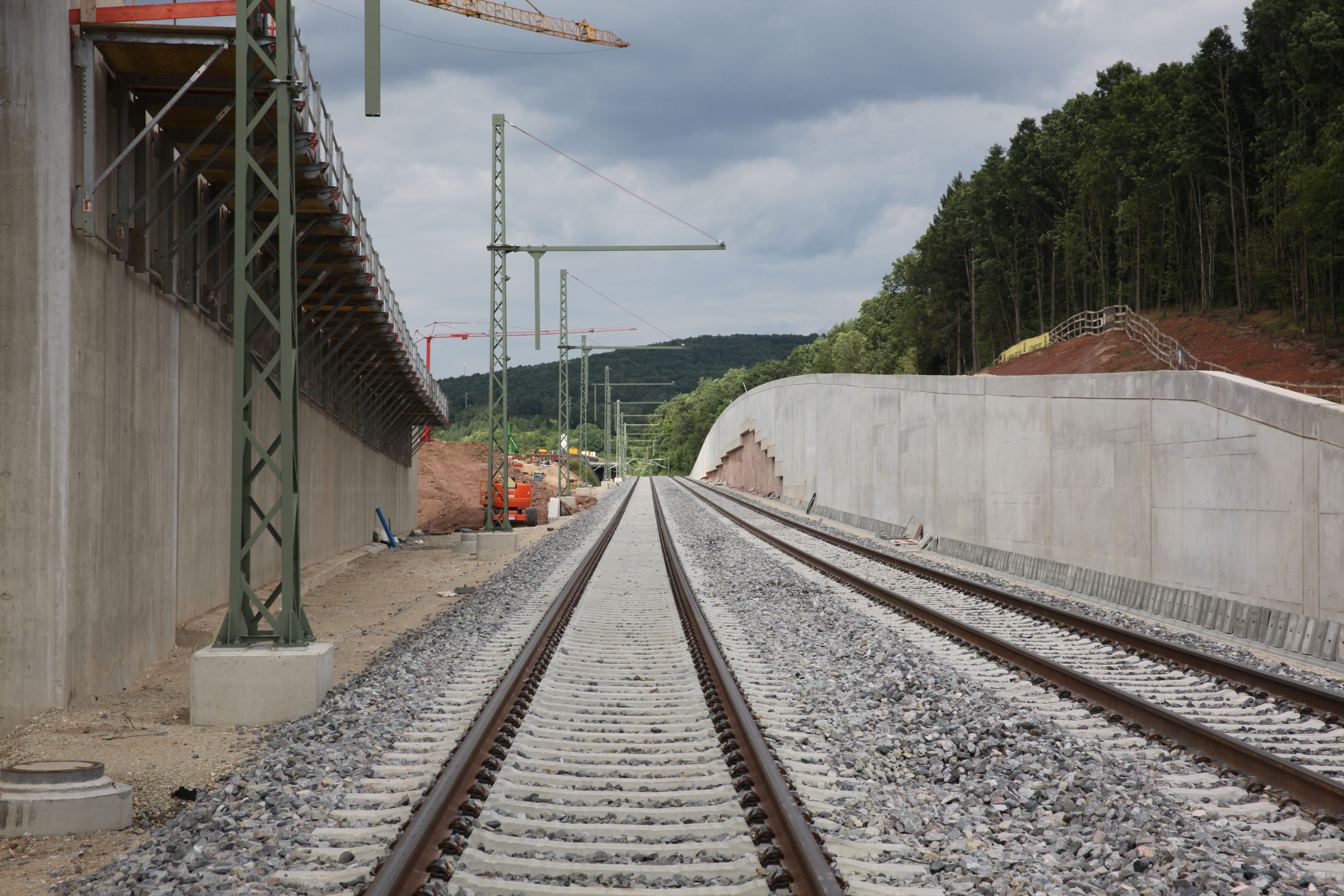
Unteroberndorf, support wall (July 2016)

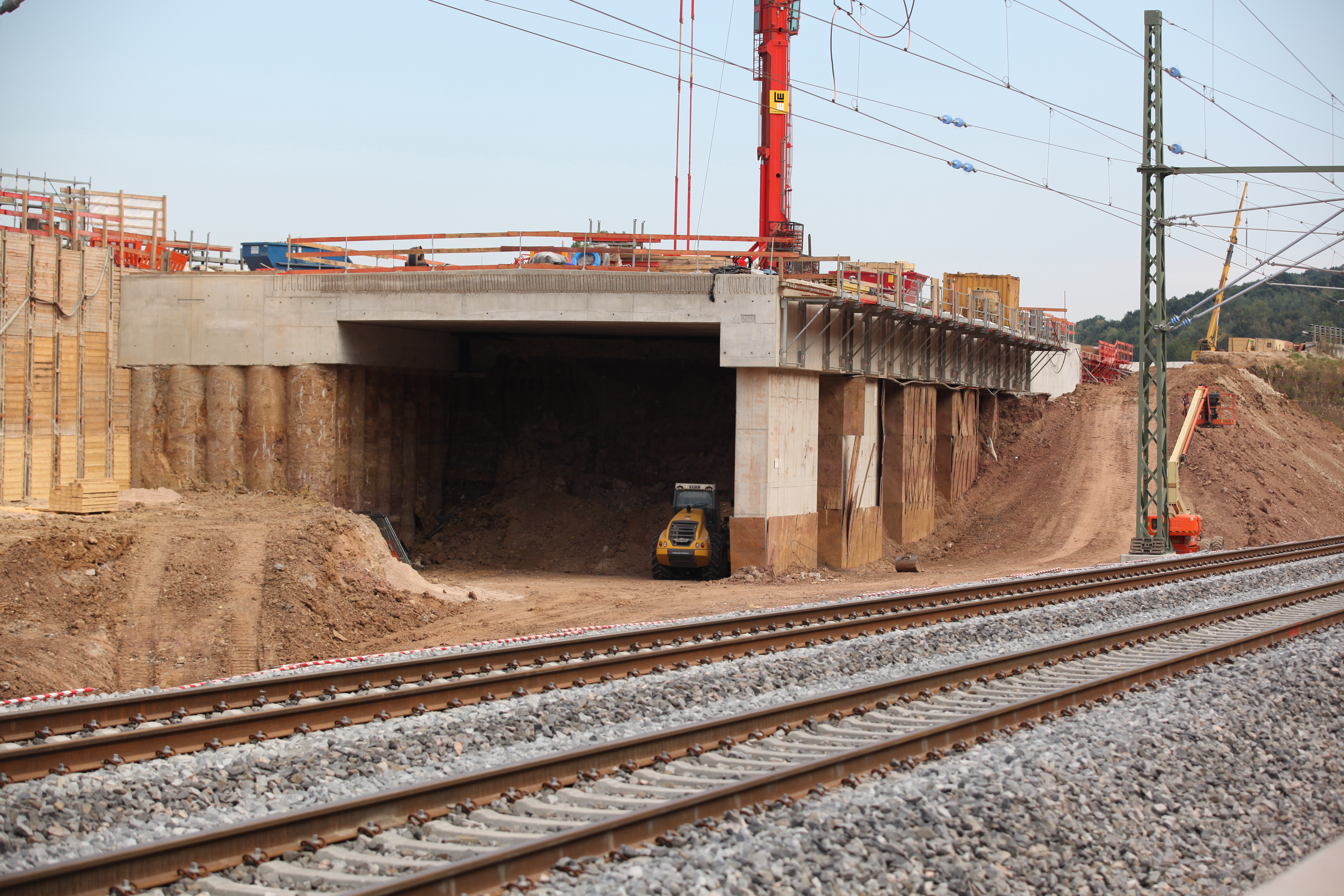
Intersection with A 73 (August 2016)

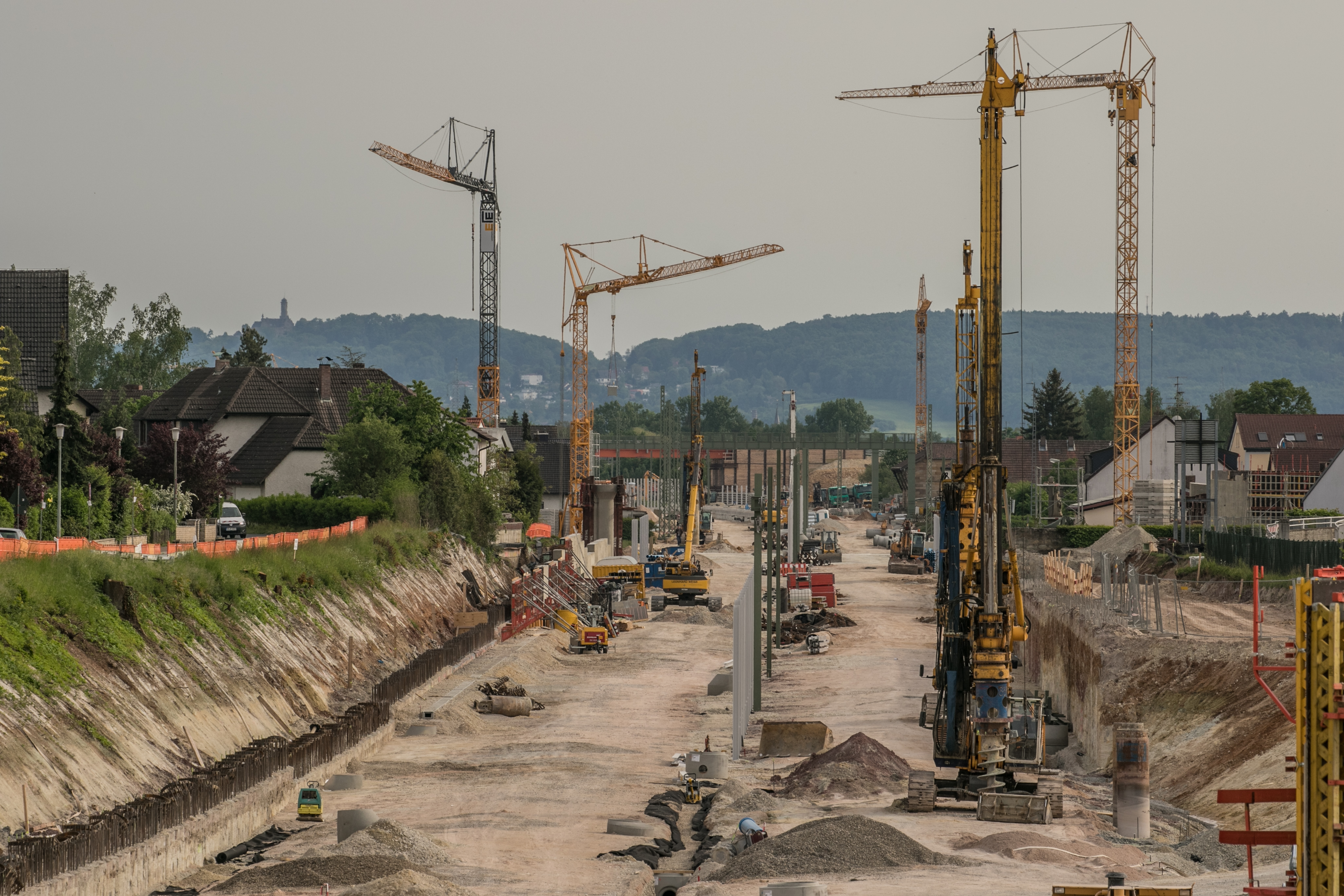
View from the auxiliary bridge in Unteroberndorf to the north towards Breitengüßbach (May 2016)

== Costs and financing ==
According to the federal government, of the estimated total costs of €5.36 billion, (net present value of planning, land acquisition and construction costs) €2.668 billion had already been spent in June 2013. This would mean the expenditure of €2.692 billion was still outstanding. The estimated cost of the Ebensfeld-Erfurt high-speed line amounted to €2.9 billion (as of 2011). At the end of 2013, the estimated costs were reduced to €5.281 billion. Of that, €3.012 billion had been spent up to the end of 2013 and €2.268 billion remained to be spent.

In 2010, the total estimated cost of the project (new construction and upgraded line) was €5,224 billion (as of 2010). According to data from Deutsche Bahn, around €540 million had been spent on the VDE 8.1 project in 2011.

Financing agreements for around €2.1 billion were still outstanding at the beginning of 2011. These were to be finalised when planning for the affected sections was completed. At the end of 2007, the projected cost was about €5.069 billion. At the end of 2008, the total estimated cost was €5,178 billion.

The new and upgraded lines were evaluated with a benefit-cost ratio of 1.8. The project is economically viable, based on a recent traffic forecast for 2025.

When the project was temporarily suspended in mid-1999, DM 620 million had been invested in the line. Up to 31 December 2005, €705 million had been invested in the project, including about €550 million for the high-speed line. In the following years, the total expenditure incurred for the planning and construction of the new line increased to €747 million to the end of 2006, €833 million to the end of 2007, €959 million to the end of 2008. and €1,225 million to the end of 2009. Around €1.7 billion had been spent by mid-2011.

On the basis of a decision of the mediation committee of the Bundestag and the Bundesrat, the provision of federal funds for the route were significantly reduced in December 2003. According to the Federal Government's investment plan for the transport infrastructure, €741.4 million was allocated to the project in the period 2006–2010. The funding requirement that is in excess of the €3.641 billion of federal funds as of 2011 is to be provided by Deutsche Bahn's own funds and third parties. The state of Thuringia is investing a total of €240 million from the European Regional Fund in the two high-speed line projects (Nuremberg–Erfurt and Erfurt–Leipzig/Halle).

In December 2008, the Federal Minister of Transport, Wolfgang Tiefensee announced that additional funds would be available so that it could be commissioned in 2016. From 2010 onwards, more than €200 million was to be made available by the federal government. At the latest from 2013 onwards, the railway would receive an annual budgetary allocation of €350 million.

The planned total costs for the new line were €2.7 billion in early 2010. Until then, construction contracts of €1.2 billion had been awarded. For the sections under construction, tenders had still not been let for construction amounting to €340 million. Between €149 and €214 million are being provided each year between 2010 and 2017. Between €17 and €60 billion were provided between 2010 and 2013. The Federal Government is providing €2.2 billion of the finance for the new line.

At the beginning of construction of the new line, on 16 April 1996, the cost of the entire Nuremberg–Erfurt project were calculated to be about DM 8.5 billion. The financial agreement for the new line was signed on 10 November 1997. This also included individual measures for the upgraded line. The construction timetable and financial plan laid down in the financing agreement could no longer be complied with due to reduced budgets as a result of a compromise negotiated in the mediation committee in December 2003.

In September 2005 an agreement was reached on the Nuremberg–Fürth section. The financing arrangements do not have any cost ceilings; the Federal Government bears the risk of cost increases. The financial agreements for the section between Nuremberg and Fürth as well as between Ebensfeld and Erfurt are updated annually. The planned share of Deutsche Bahn AG in the overall project is included in the €158.4 million, that is €63.0 million for the new line.

Individual financial agreements between the Federal Government and the business sectors of DB Netz, DB Station&Service and DB Energie covered the financing of the project as a whole. As part of the Trans-European Networks, the project benefits from co-finance in part from the European Regional Development Fund (ERDF). In the 2007-2013 funding period, ERDF funds from the "Operational Program Transport" in the amount of €239.3 million were planned; these were approved on 20 November 2009.

In mid-1993 the estimated costs of the approximately 196 kilometre-long new and upgraded line was about DM 7.196 billion. In 1994, DB AG estimated the cost of the 109 kilometre-long new line as DM 4.044 billion (€2.068 billion; 1994 prices). At the start of construction, in April 1996, the costs were calculated as DM 8.3 billion (about €4.2 billion ). The increase in costs was caused by the conversion of costs from real to (inflation-adjusted) nominal values and increased technical requirements.

In addition, funds from a stimulatory package in response to the 2008 financial crisis have been applied to the line.

== Criticism ==
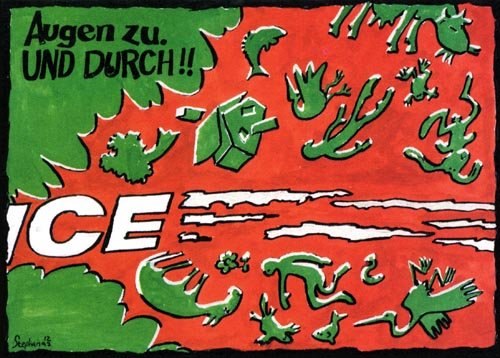
Postcard of the Citizen Initiative Das bessere Bahnkonzept (The better railway concept) against the new line (1994)

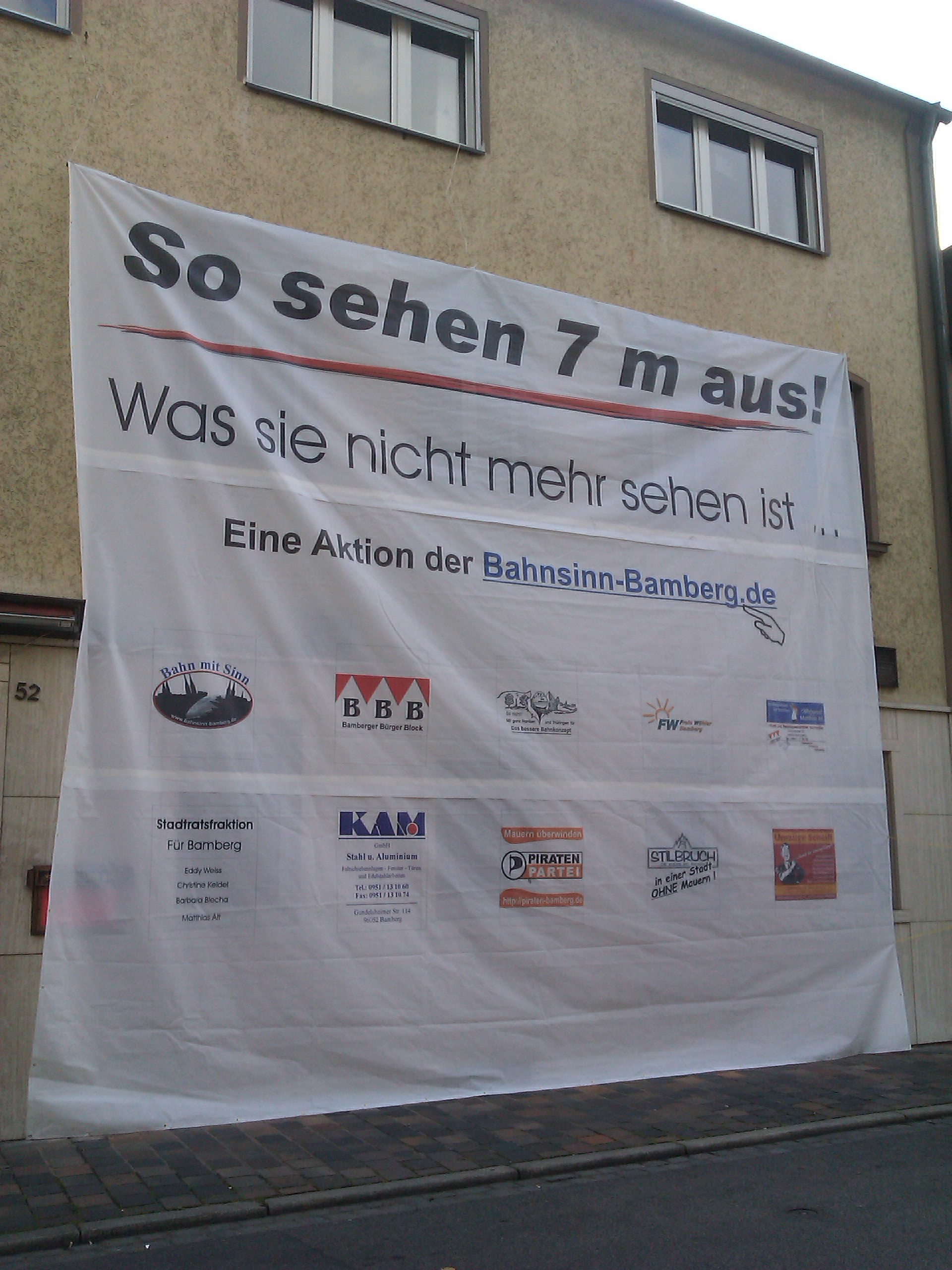
Protest banner in Bamberg against the planned noise barriers

The construction of the route was criticised for various reasons. Some criticism related to the route, since it was not possible to bundle different ICE routes over the line. Therefore, as with the existing Franconian Forest Railway, only one long-distance train service per hour and each way was expected.

Critics such as Alliance 90/The Greens and Bund für Umwelt und Naturschutz Deutschland believed the project was pointless and a waste of public funds. They proposed instead to upgrade the rail network in northern Bavaria. Vieregg-Rössler (a consultancy), the Greens and the Verkehrsclub Deutschland (a lobby group for environmentally-friendly transport solutions, VCD) suggested, at the end of 1992, that traffic should run from Erfurt via Gera, Plauen and Hof to Nuremberg. Since 1992, Das bessere Bahnkonzept ("The better railway concept") acted as the umbrella organisation for the citizen initiatives that opposed the line.

Prior to a joint meeting of the Bavarian and Thuringian state cabinets, citizens' lists with around 50,000 signatures were submitted against the project and against the A 73 autobahn project.

Representatives of Deutsche Bahn also repeatedly criticised the project. In April 1997, the former DB Chairman, Heinz Dürr told the Transport Committee of the Deutsche Bundestag that the route "does not pay particularly". The head of the urban transport division wrote in the same year that the route made "no entrepreneurial sense."

Nature conservationists criticised the far-reaching impacts of the new line on the landscape and called it the "most expensive U-Bahn in the world". Transport scientist Heiner Monheim demanded the end of construction in 2007. Instead of the large-scale project, numerous smaller measures would bring about improvements in the area. The majority of the customers did not need the route, just "the construction industry, so that they deserve a golden nose, or speed fetishists dreaming of a high-speed network in Europe."

A citizens' initiative was launched around 2009 promoting a route via Lichtenfels, along the A 73, which according to its information would have been €0.5 billion cheaper than the route planned south of Coburg. The Federal Ministry of Transport rejected the proposed route due to its significant impacts. The Ministry also doubted the achievable savings on the basis of the proposed passage through Lichtenfels, Schney and Grub am Forst.

In Bamberg the upgrade plans caused protests among citizens, as DB planned to build high noise barriers. Subsequently, the plans were rejected. Three new options emerged from a dialogue: optimised new noise protection on the existing route, which would be lowered at sensitive points, a tunnel for freight trains or a complete bypass of Bamberg to the east through the main stretch of carr (marshy forest), parallel to the A 73. The current draft of the Federal Transport Plan (Bundesverkehrswegeplan) for 2030 included the bypass along the A 73, because it has the best benefit/cost ratio.

Prior to the application for planning approval on 2 May 2016, the Bamberg council passed a resolution by a majority on 27 April 2016 that rejected an eastern bypass. It was feared that the ICE stop at Bamberg station would be abandoned. The planning approval process was expected to commence by the spring of 2017.
