= Wipfra =

Wipfra may refer to:

- Wipfra, Wipfratal, a district of the municipality Wipfratal in Thuringia, Germany
- Wipfra (river), a river of Thuringia, Germany
