= Wipfratal =

- Part of Arnstadt
- Interactive map of Wipfratal
- Location within Germany Location within Thuringia
- Coordinates: 50°47′8″N 10°59′34″E
- Country: Germany
- State: Thuringia
- District: Ilm-Kreis
- Municipality: Arnstadt
- Disbanded: 2019
- Subdivisions: 12

Area
  - Total: 49.91 km^{2} (19.27 sq mi)
- Elevation: 319 m (1,047 ft)

Population (2017-12-31)
  - Total: 2,907
  - Density: 58.24/km^{2} (150.9/sq mi)
- Time zone: UTC+01:00 (CET)
  - Summer (DST): UTC+02:00 (CEST)
- Postal codes: 99310
- Dialling codes: 03629
- Vehicle registration: IK
- Website: www.wipfratal.de

Wipfratal (German pronunciation: [ˈvɪpfʁaˌtaːl], lit. 'Wipfra Valley') is a former municipality in the district Ilm-Kreis, in Thuringia, Germany. On 1 January 2019, it was merged into the town Arnstadt.

Wipratal consisted of the following villages: Branchewinda, Dannheim, Ettischleben, Görbitzhausen, Hausen, Kettmanshausen, Marlishausen, Neuroda, Reinsfeld, Roda, Schmerfeld and Wipfra.
