= Wipfra (river) =

River in Germany

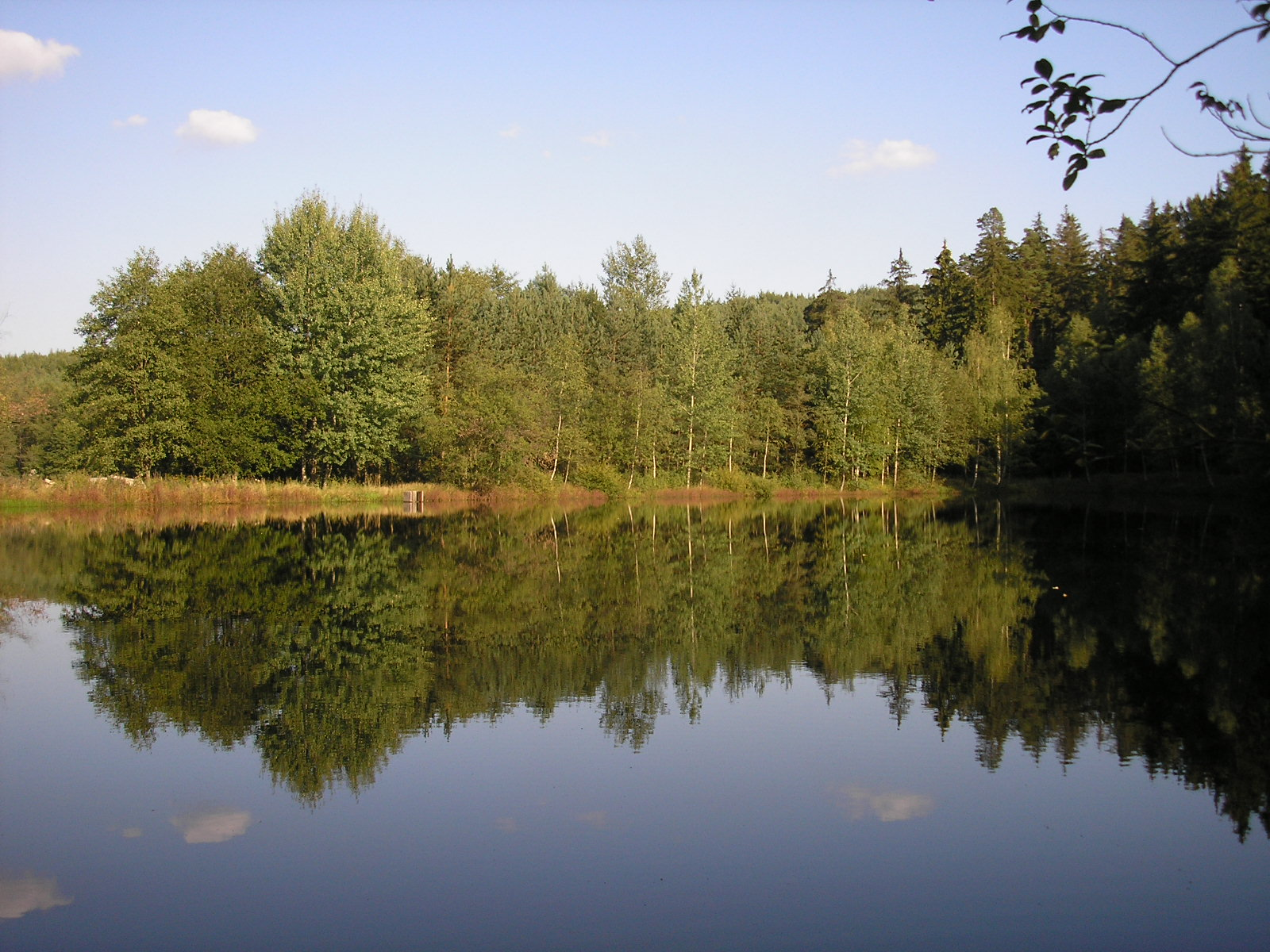

Location
- Country: Germany
- State: Thuringia

Physical characteristics
- Mouth
  - location: Gera
  - coordinates: 50.8911°N 10.9751°E

Basin features
- Progression: Gera→ Unstrut→ Saale→ Elbe→ North Sea

Wipfra (German pronunciation: [ˈvɪpfʁa]) is a river of Thuringia, Germany. It flows into the Gera near Eischleben.

== Geography ==
The Wipfra River rises west of Oberpörlitz in the Ilmenau municipal area at the Hirtenbusch ponds. There, on the approximately 560-meter-high Habichtsberg hill, lies the source of the Wipfra, which has relatively low water levels. Initially, the river flows eastwards approximately 2 kilometers, after which it forms the Streichgrund valley, which stretches from Unterpörlitz to the Heyda Reservoir. North of Unterpörlitz, the Wipfra is traversed by the A 71 autobahn via the Streichgrund Valley Bridge. Here, it forms a marshy valley with numerous small pools and ponds. Further, it turns northeast and continues for a short distance, until it is joined by the Alte Wipfra (Old Wipfra), which flows through the Altwipfergrund valley and is also crossed by the A 71 via the Altwipfergrund Valley Bridge. The Wipfra's right-bank tributary valley stretches eastwards from Unterpörlitz to the Eichicht residential area of Ilmenau, to form several small ponds.

The convergence of the Streich and Altwipfergrund valleys, produced the Streichteich pond, which represents a unique wetland biotope. It lies at an elevation of 424 meters and is home to numerous aquatic animals. Below the Streichteich pond, the Wipfra flows over the Streitwiese meadow before emptying into the Heyda Reservoir, a manmade feature constructed in 1988. The Heyda Reservoir is the largest body of water in the Ilm district, covering approximately 95 hectares with a water level of 417 meters above sea level when full. The Schotterbach and Heydaer Bach streams also join the Wipfra within the reservoir. The dam is approximately 18 meters high. The reservoir primarily serves to supply processed water to the surrounding area.

North of the dam, the Wipfra River enters a plain for the first time. Here it also crosses the border between the towns of Ilmenau and Arnstadt. The villages of Heyda, Schmerfeld, Wipfra, Neuroda, Kettmannshausen, and Reinsfeld lie on the plain; although Heyda belongs to the town of Arnstadt. The plain is about 400 meters above sea level and is used for agriculture. Here the Wipfra continues its trajectory in a northeasterly direction, flowing through the villages of Wipfra and Neuroda, before the slopes on both banks become steeper to form another valley. Here the river cuts through a spur of the Reinsberge hills. It is flanked to the west by the 544-meter-high Gottlobsberg and to the east by the 502-meter-high Willinger Berg. Beyond the Wipfra Gorge, ith3 river once again crosses the A71 motorway and the Nuremberg–Erfurt high-speed rail line again. The Wipfra then makes a wide 270° turn from east to north, passing through the villages of Behringen, Oberwillingen, and Niederwillingen, where the Arnstadt–Saalfeld railway line enters the valley, which then opens up again.

The Wipfra now meanders through a plain of approximately 250 km², formed by the river itself, at an elevation of 300 to 400 meters above sea level. The next villages are situated along the Wipfra at short intervals. First comes Roda, followed by Görbitzhausen, Hausen, and Marlishausen. All of these villages belong to the town of Arnstadt. Marlishausen has only about 1,200 inhabitants. Here, the railway line leaves the Wipfra again, turning west towards Arnstadt. The last village belonging to the town of Arnstadt along the river is Ettischleben. This is followed by Alkersleben and then Elxleben, where the Wipfra changes its course from north to west. The next village on the Wipfra is Kirchheim, which belongs to the municipality of Amt Wachsenburg. Alkersleben and Elxleben are part of the administrative community of Riechheimer Berg. The last village on the Wipfra is Eischleben; west of this village, the Wipfra ends its journey by flowing into the Gera River.

== History ==
Until the year 1920, the waters of the Wipfra flowed across 5 state borders despite having a length of just 40 kilometers.

The upper section, up to the village of Wipfra, belonged to the Ilmenau district of the Grand Duchy of Saxe-Weimar-Eisenach. Neuroda belonged to Saxe-Gotha, and beyond Neuroda lay the territory of the Arnstadt district, which belonged to the Principality of Schwarzburg-Sondershausen. Elxleben belonged to Schwarzburg-Rudolstadt, Kirchheim to Prussia, and Eischleben again to Saxe-Gotha. However, the Wipfra was not a border river along its entire course.

== Name Origin ==
According to prominent onomastician and Germanist, Elfriede Ulbricht, the origin of the river's name was probably derived from the Middle Low German, Dutch, or Middle English word "Wippen." Ulbricht suggests that the river name is attested 15 times in Germany, also in variations such as "Wipfer." The root word was originally "aha" (a variant of "-au"). This weakened to "-a" in the late 10th century and to "-e" in the early 11th century, after which it disappeared completely in the case of the Wipper. Other rivers with this name retained the "-a" or "-e." The name would thus be composed of "drehen" (to turn), "drehende, schwingende Bewegung" (rotating, swinging movement), and "Wasser" (water) (in the sense of flowing water).

Linguists Felix Solmsen and Ernst Fraenkel proposed a very similar meaning, but saw the root of the name as having an even older, Indo-European origin and translated the river name as "die Hüpfende" (the leaping one).

== See also ==
- List of rivers of Thuringia
