= Großbreitenbach (Verwaltungsgemeinschaft) =

Coordinates: 50°34′58″N 11°00′38″E

Großbreitenbach is a former Verwaltungsgemeinschaft ("collective municipality") in the district Ilm-Kreis, in Thuringia, Germany. The seat of the Verwaltungsgemeinschaft was in Großbreitenbach. It was disbanded in January 2019.

The Verwaltungsgemeinschaft Großbreitenbach consisted of the following municipalities:

1. Altenfeld
2. Böhlen
3. Friedersdorf
4. Gillersdorf
5. Großbreitenbach
6. Herschdorf
7. Neustadt am Rennsteig
8. Wildenspring
