= Alkersleben =

- Municipality
- Location of Alkersleben within Ilm-Kreis district
- Interactive map of Alkersleben
- Location within Germany Location within Thuringia
- Coordinates: 50°50′48″N 11°2′33″E
- Country: Germany
- State: Thuringia
- District: Ilm-Kreis
- Municipal assoc.: Riechheimer Berg

Government
  - Mayor (2022–28): André Wagner

Area
  - Total: 7.09 km^{2} (2.74 sq mi)
- Elevation: 290 m (950 ft)

Population (2025-12-31)
  - Total: 299
  - Density: 42.2/km^{2} (109/sq mi)
- Time zone: UTC+01:00 (CET)
  - Summer (DST): UTC+02:00 (CEST)
- Postal codes: 99310
- Dialling codes: 036200
- Vehicle registration: IK
- Website: Alkersleben

Alkersleben (German pronunciation: [ˈalkɐsleːbn̩]) is a municipality in the Ilm-Kreis district in Thuringia, Germany. The municipality is a member of the collective municipality Riechheimer Berg.

== Geography ==
=== Geographical Location ===
Alkersleben lies in the Wipfra depression between Ettischleben in the south and Elxleben in the north, six kilometres east of Arnstadt at an altitude of about 290 metres. In the west lies the 322 metre high Kirchheimer Höhe, and in the east the landscape gradually inclines to a height of 393 metres, where both the Sichemberg and the commercial airfield are located. Alongside the Wipfra flowing through in a south-north direction, the municipal area is also completely free of forest and is used for farming. The area is a part of the Thuringian Basin and is characterised by fertile soil and a relatively dry climate.

=== Neighbouring Municipalities ===
Starting from the north and going in a clockwise direction: Elxleben, Elleben, Osthausen-Wülfershausen, Bösleben-Wüllersleben, Dornheim, Arnstadt, Amt Wachsenburg.

== History ==
In Alkersleben, a castle once secured the crossing of the road leading from Arnstadt in the direction of Lobeda via the Wipfra. A quadrilateral hill still bears witness to this past fortification.

The place was first recorded in 1257 as Alkersleibin. There was previously a Manor, whose lords, along with representatives from the Church, dictated life in the village. In 1816 a family acquired the manor. In 1844 the stone bridge crossing over the Wipfra was built.

Until 1920 the village belonged to the Arnstadt department in the principality of Schwarzburg-Sondershausen (Oberherrschaft), and on the 1 July 1950 the village incorporated the independent municipality of Ettischleben.

The religious establishment Dorfkirche St. Greogrius is traced back to a chapel from the 12th century and houses grand paintings from the baroque era. The cemetery was also classified as a protected monument.

=== Population Development ===
- 1843 – 309
- 1939 – 383
- 1989 – 352
- 2005 – 341
- 2010 – 325
- 2015 – 312
- 2019 - 314

Data source: from 1994 Thüringer Landesamt für Statistik – values from 31 December

== Politics ==
=== Local Council ===
The council of the Alkersleben municipality consists of six male and six female councillors. Following the local elections on the 26 May 2019, the makeup of the council is as follows:

- Feuerwehrverein Alkersleben e. V.: 5 seats
- Sportverein Alkersleben e. V.: 1 seat

=== Mayor ===
The voluntary Mayor André Wagner was elected in June 2022.

== Economy and Infrastructure ==
Alkersleben is considered to be an agricultural village.

Since the end of the 2005, a Dutch investor had been planning to erect a large pig farm with 22,500 animals and a slurry tank with a capacity of 6,500 cubic metres on the site of a former dairy farm, which had held 2,000 cows until the Wende. Owing to the controversy of the project, in particular the possible risk of odour nuisance over a wide area, more than 2000 objections were raised by citizens and organisations. The plans were accepted by the state administration office of Thuringia at the beginning of April 2009, and have since been realised.

Roads from Alkersleben lead to Dornheim and Osthausen-Wülfershausen. To the east of the village the airfield Arnstadt-Alkersleben is situated, where Historical Flight Days and Speed Days regularly take place.

== Personalities ==
- Udo Eggert (1848–1893), German university lecturer and political scientist
- Johann Friedrich Christoph Ernesti (1705–1758), German theologian (Evangelical Lutheran)
- Johann Arnold Zeitfuchs (1671–1742), German theologian (Evangelical Lutheran)
