= Langer Berg =

Verwaltungsgemeinschaft in Thuringia, Germany

Coordinates: 50.650°N 11.000°E

Langer Berg is a former Verwaltungsgemeinschaft ("collective municipality") in the district Ilm-Kreis, in Thuringia, Germany. The seat of the Verwaltungsgemeinschaft was in Gehren. It was disbanded in July 2018.

The Verwaltungsgemeinschaft Langer Berg consisted of the following municipalities:

1. Gehren
2. Herschdorf
3. Neustadt am Rennsteig
4. Pennewitz
