= 1st German Bratwurst Museum =

Museum in Thuringia, Germany

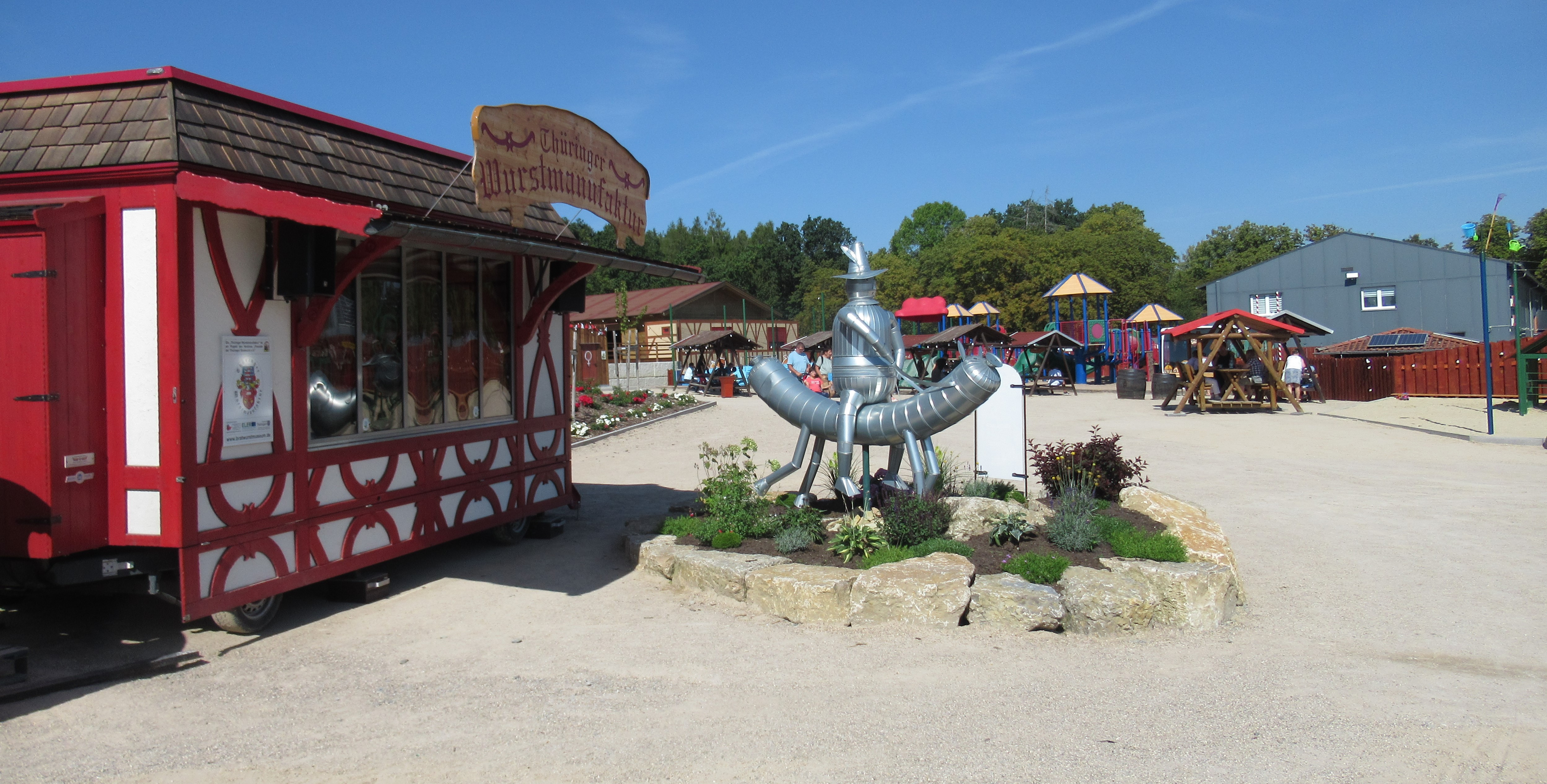
- 1st German Bratwurst Museum in Mühlhausen/Thuringia shortly after opening in September 2023
- Interactive map of 1st German Bratwurst Museum
- Location: Mühlhausen/Thuringia
- Coordinates: 51.195225740°N 10.396775098°E
- Opened: May 28, 2006 (in Holzhausen) August 16, 2023 (in Mühlhausen/Thuringia)
- Attendance: 50,000
- Area: 3.7 ha (9.1 acres)
- Website: https://www.bratwurstmuseum.de/

The 1st German Bratwurst Museum is a theme park and museum dedicated to the subject of bratwurst, especially the Thuringian Rostbratwurst, located in Mühlhausen/Thuringia. The amusement park and museum were opened in May 2006 in Holzhausen near Arnstadt, closed in April 2020, and reopened in September 2023 in Mühlhausen/Thuringia.

== History ==
=== Beginnings in Holzhausen ===
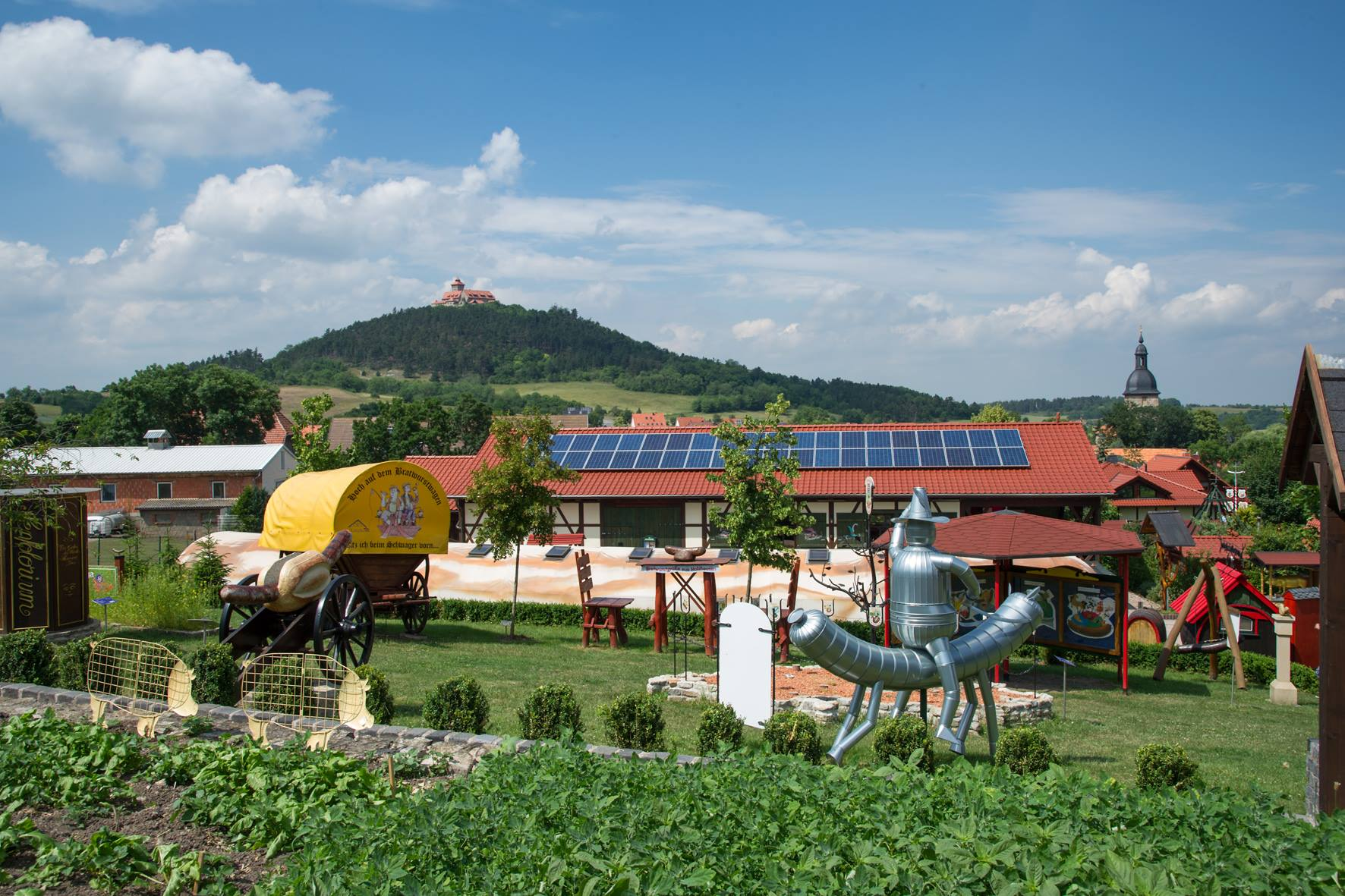
Site at the old location in Holzhausen, below the Wachsenburg, 2019

The 1st German Bratwurst Museum was opened on May 28, 2006, in Holzhausen, a district of the municipality Amt Wachsenburg in the Ilm-Kreis, 6 km from Arnstadt. The museum has been ideologically supported by the association Friends of the Thuringian Bratwurst e. V. since its foundation. The museum collected information about pig breeds, meat and sausage processing, recipes, and devices for slaughtering and producing the Thuringian bratwurst. The centerpiece is the documented first mention of bratwurst on January 20, 1404, in an account by Johann von Siebeleben, Provost of the Walpurgis Monastery of Arnstadt, which was later dissolved during the Reformation. In this document, it is stated that "1 gr for intestines for bratwurst" (1 Groschen for bratwurst casings) was spent.

In January 2008, the exhibition was expanded to include a replica of a monastic kitchen and a provost's office as they might have been imagined in 1404 in Arnstadt. Additionally, a model design of the Thuringian Fair, which was an attraction at the World Exhibition in Brussels in 1910, was recreated in miniature format. At that time, an authentic Thuringian fair with a festival site, half-timbered houses, and the Bratwurst Eater as a characteristic symbol figure was brought to life on 72 m². The original design by sculptor Reinhard Möller with life-sized figures is located in the German Toy Museum in Sonneberg.

In November 2008, the museum received the Thuringian Marketing Award for Tourism 2008 from the Thuringian Ministry for Economy, Science and Digital Society worth 8000 euros.

In its 15 years of existence, the museum, with its exhibition and events, attracted over 800,000 visitors to the small town below the Wachsenburg. Due to the high number of visitors, about 50,000 per year, the infrastructure of the museum's location reached its limits, and the museum sought a new location. The museum operation in Holzhausen was discontinued on April 1, 2020.

=== Relocation to Mühlhausen/Thuringia ===
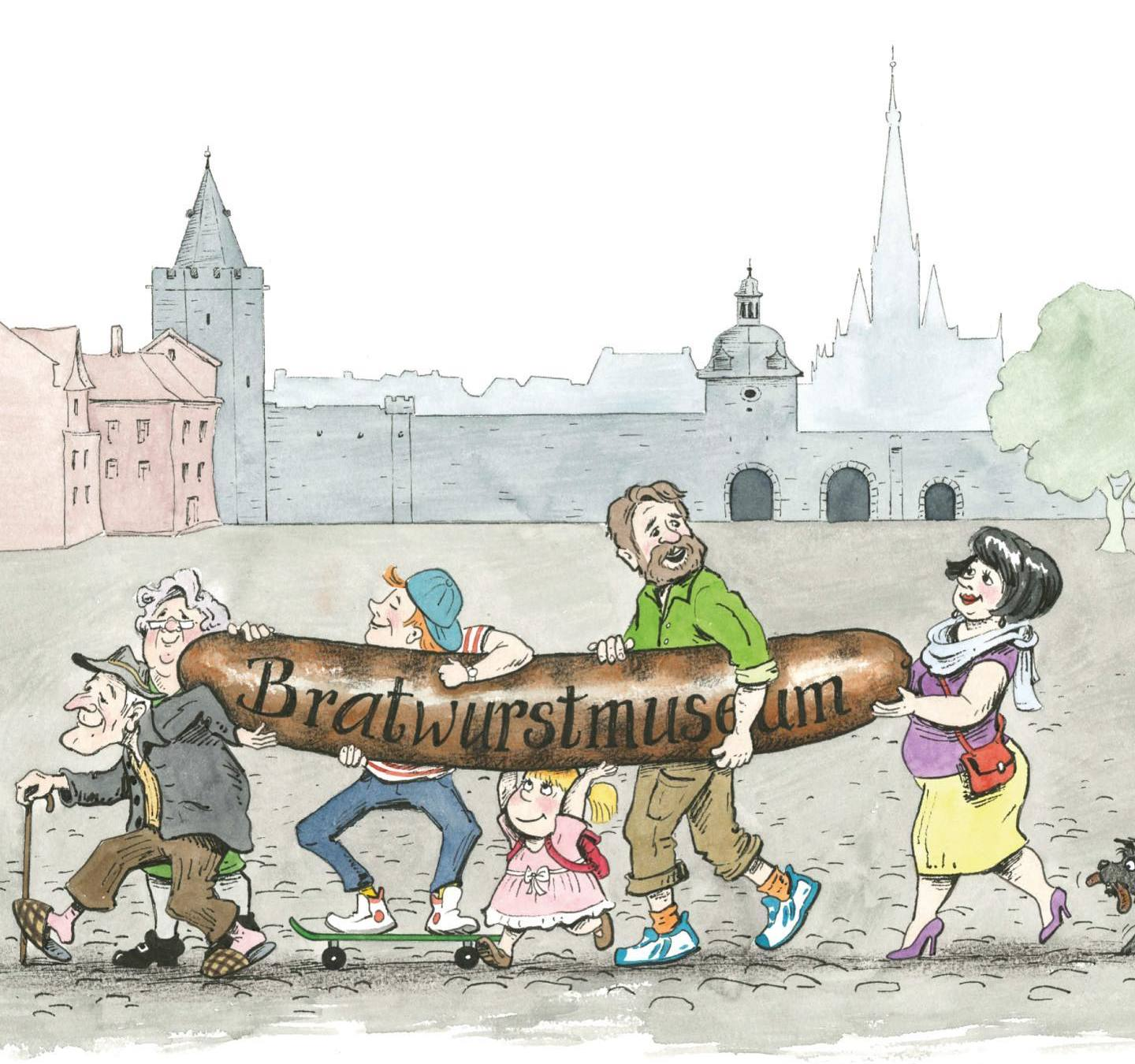
Graphic showing the move to Thuringian Mühlhausen

The original new location for the museum was the site of the former concentration camp Martha II, a subcamp of the Buchenwald concentration camp. After protests from various sides, including Josef Schuster, the president of the Central Council of Jews in Germany, the plans were abandoned. The private investor and the city of Mühlhausen stated that they had not known or properly assessed the history of the site. A 3.7-hectare area at the Mühlhäuser Stadtwald in the southwest of the city was chosen as the new location. The property in Mühlhausen is four times the size of the old one in Holzhausen.

The foundation stone for the new building was laid on January 20, 2020. The museum was originally scheduled to open in May 2020. Delays in construction due to waterlogged ground and the COVID-19 pandemic necessitated an interim solution. Therefore, a "Bratwurst Museum on the Road" was set up in the Mühlhäuser Hof hotel in downtown Mühlhausen. The amusement park and museum were reopened on August 16, 2023.

== Media presence ==
As a regional tourist attraction, the museum has repeatedly been the subject of national coverage. For example, the ARD listed it among Germany's most bizarre museums in September 2006. MDR filmed on-site on June 29, 2007, for the show The Central German Museum Night, broadcast in the Thuringian regional program on July 12, 2007.
