= Wachsenburg =

Wachsenburg may refer to:

- Wachsenburg Castle, a castle in Thuringia, Germany
- Amt Wachsenburg, a municipality in Thuringia, Germany
- Wachsenburggemeinde, a former municipality in Thuringia, Germany
