= Wachsenburggemeinde =

- Ortsteil of Amt Wachsenburg
- Coat of arms
- Interactive map of Wachsenburggemeinde
- Location within Germany Location within Thuringia
- Coordinates: 50°51′N 10°53′E
- Country: Germany
- State: Thuringia
- District: Ilm-Kreis
- Municipality: Amt Wachsenburg
- Subdivisions: 5

Area
  - Total: 31.99 km^{2} (12.35 sq mi)
- Elevation: 268 m (879 ft)

Population (2011-12-31)
  - Total: 2,531
  - Density: 79.12/km^{2} (204.9/sq mi)
- Time zone: UTC+01:00 (CET)
  - Summer (DST): UTC+02:00 (CEST)
- Postal codes: 99310
- Dialling codes: 03628 (OT Sülzenbrücken: 036202)
- Vehicle registration: IK
- Website: www.wachsenburg-gemeinde.de

Wachsenburggemeinde (German pronunciation: [ˈvaksn̩bʊʁkɡəˌmaɪndə], lit. 'Wachsenburg Municipality') is a former municipality in the district Ilm-Kreis, in Thuringia, Germany. The municipality was named after the Wachsenburg Castle which is located in its center. It consisted of the five villages named Bittstädt, Haarhausen, Holzhausen, Röhrensee, and Sülzenbrücken. Since 31 December 2012, it is part of the municipality Amt Wachsenburg, formed after being merged with Ichtershausen.
