= Thörey =

Coordinates: 50°53′15″N 10°56′40″E

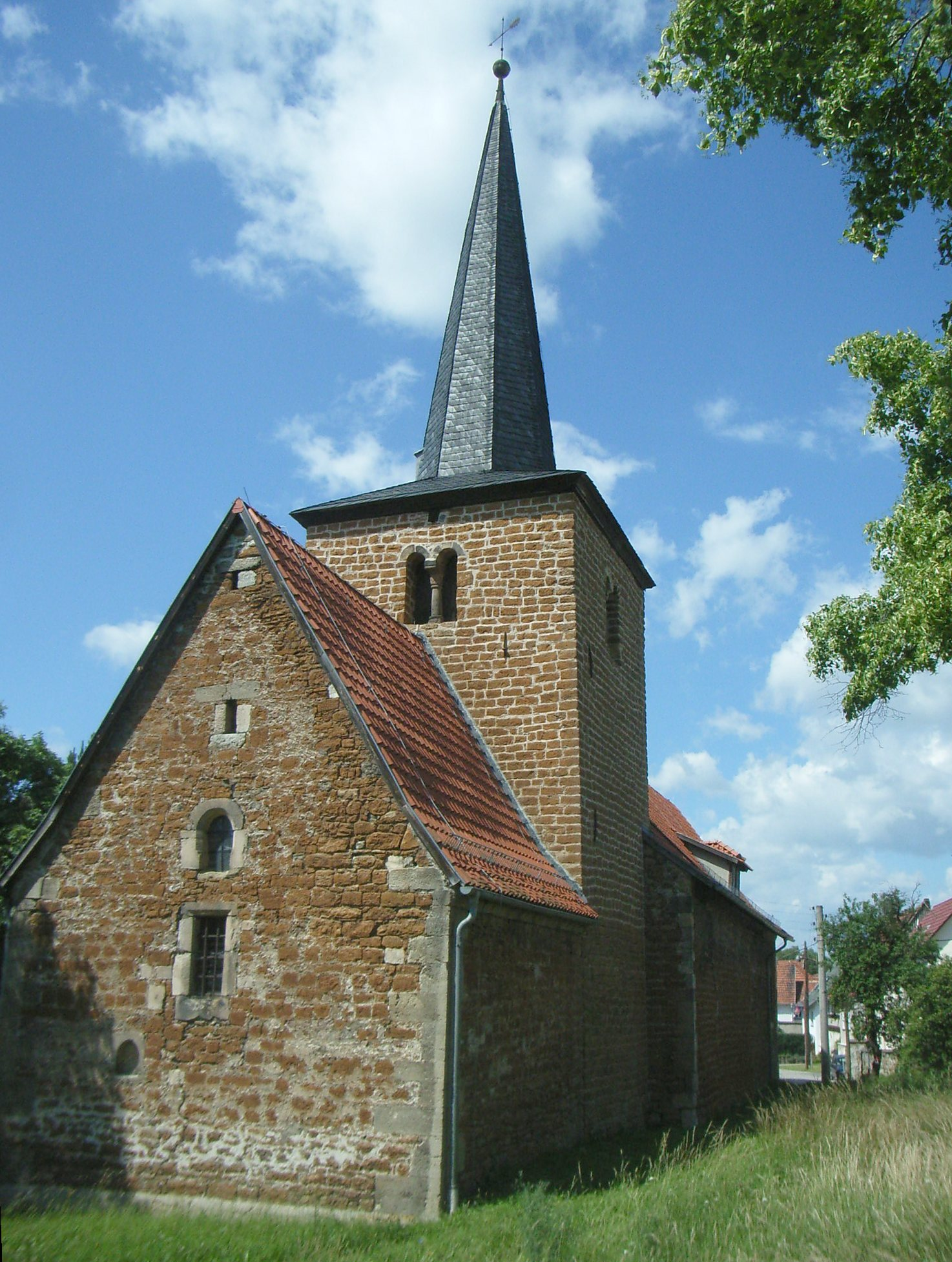
Church in Thörey

Thörey is a village near Ichtershausen in Ilm-Kreis, Thuringia, Germany, with about 250 inhabitants. It is part of the municipality Amt Wachsenburg.
