= Elxleben, Ilm-Kreis =

Elxleben
- Municipality
- Location of Elxleben within Ilm-Kreis district
- Interactive map of Elxleben
- Location within Germany Location within Thuringia
- Coordinates: 50°51′56″N 11°3′24″E
- Country: Germany
- State: Thuringia
- District: Ilm-Kreis
- Municipal assoc.: Riechheimer Berg

Government
  - Mayor (2022–28): Swen Glietsch (CDU)

Area
  - Total: 9.47 km^{2} (3.66 sq mi)
- Elevation: 280 m (920 ft)

Population (2025-12-31)
  - Total: 645
  - Density: 68.1/km^{2} (176/sq mi)
- Time zone: UTC+01:00 (CET)
  - Summer (DST): UTC+02:00 (CEST)
- Postal codes: 99334
- Dialling codes: 036200
- Vehicle registration: IK
- Website: Gemeinde Elxleben

Elxleben (German pronunciation: [ˈɛlksˌleːbn̩]; or Elxleben am Steiger, to differentiate it from Elxleben an der Gera) is a municipality in the district Ilm-Kreis, in Thuringia, Germany.
