= Kirchheim, Thuringia =

Kirchheim
- Ortsteil of Amt Wachsenburg
- Coat of arms
- Interactive map of Kirchheim
- Location within Germany Location within Thuringia
- Coordinates: 50°52′55″N 11°1′10″E
- Country: Germany
- State: Thuringia
- District: Ilm-Kreis
- Municipality: Amt Wachsenburg
- Subdivisions: 3

Area
  - Total: 21.2 km^{2} (8.2 sq mi)
- Elevation: 250 m (820 ft)

Population (2017-12-31)
  - Total: 1,274
  - Density: 60.1/km^{2} (156/sq mi)
- Time zone: UTC+01:00 (CET)
  - Summer (DST): UTC+02:00 (CEST)
- Postal codes: 99334
- Dialling codes: 036200
- Vehicle registration: IK
- Website: https://www.amt-wachsenburg.de/gemeindeinformationen/ortsteile/kirchheim.php

Kirchheim (German pronunciation: [ˈkɪʁçhaɪm]) is a village and a former municipality in the district Ilm-Kreis, in Thuringia, Germany. Since 1 January 2019, it is part of the municipality Amt Wachsenburg.

== Villages ==
- Kirchheim
- Bechstedt-Wagd
- Werningsleben
