= Rollstuhlbasketball-Bundesliga =

Rollstuhlbasketball-Bundesliga (RBBL)
- Sport: Wheelchair basketball
- Founded: 1990
- Owner: Deutscher Rollstuhlsport-Verband (DRS)
- No. of teams: 10
- Country: Germany
- Most recent champion: RSV Lahn-Dill
- Most titles: RSV Lahn-Dill (13 titles)
- Relegation to: 2. Bundesliga
- Website: http://www.rbbl.de

The Rollstuhlbasketball-Bundesliga (RBBL) (Wheelchair basketball federal league) is the first division of Wheelchair basketball in Germany.

== Overview ==
The RBBL plays with ten teams, which first compete in a main phase with home and away game. The four top ranked teams then enter the playoffs, which are played with semi-finals and a final in a best of three mode. The two teams ranked last are relegated to the northern of southern conference of the 2. Bundesliga (second federal league) depending on their geographic location. The two champions of the 2. Bundesliga conferences are promoted to the RBBL.

Host of the RBBL is the Deutscher Rollstuhlsport-Verband (DRS) (German wheel chair sports association).

== History ==
The RBBL was founded in 1990 and played with eight teams until 1995. Starting with the season 1995-96, it was extended to ten teams.

== Teams 2015-16 ==
Team	City	Seasons
BSC Rollers Zwickau	Zwickau	1998-
BG Baskets Hamburg	Hamburg	2009-2010, 2012-
FCK Rolling Devils	Kaiserslautern	2014-
Doneck Dolphins Trier	Trier	1996-2001, 2003-
Hannover United	Hannover	2011-2012, 2013-2014, 2015-
Mainhatten Skywheelers	Frankfurt	
RSB Team Thuringia Bulls	Elxleben	2010-
RBC Köln 99ers	Cologne	2006-
RSV Lahn-Dill	Wetzlar	1994-
USC München	Munich	1990-2013, 2015-

== Championships ==
=== Title holders ===
Season	Champion
1990-1991	BSG Duisburg
1991-1992	USC München
1992-1993	USC München
1993-1994	RSC Frankfurt
1994-1995	USC München
1995-1996	USC München
1996-1997	RSC Osnabrück
1997-1998	RSV Lahn-Dill
1998-1999	ASV Bonn
1999-2000	ASV Bonn
2000-2001	ASV Bonn
2001-2002	RSC-Rollis Zwickau
2002-2003	SGK Rolling Chocolate
2003-2004	RSV Lahn-Dill
2004-2005	RSV Lahn-Dill
2005-2006	RSV Lahn-Dill
2006-2007	RSV Lahn-Dill
2007-2008	RSV Lahn-Dill
2008-2009	RSC-Rollis Zwickau
2009/2010	RSV Lahn-Dill
2010-2011	RSV Lahn-Dill
2011-2012	RSV Lahn-Dill
2012-2013	RSV Lahn-Dill
2013-2014	RSV Lahn-Dill
2014-2015	RSV Lahn-Dill
2015-2016	RSB Thuringia Bulls
2016-2017	RSV Lahn-Dill
2017-2018	RSB Thuringia Bulls

=== Record champions ===
Team	Titles
RSV Lahn-Dill	13
USC München	4
ASV Bonn	3
RSB Thuringia Bulls	2
RSC-Rollis Zwickau	2
BSG Duisburg	1
RSC Osnabrück	1
SGK Rolling Chocolate	1
RSC Frankfurt	1
