= Nicolaus Vetter =

German organist and composer

Andreas Nicolaus Vetter
- Born: c. 1666; Herschdorf, Germany
- Died: 13 June 1734
- Era: Baroque

Andreas Nicolaus Vetter (German: [ˈfɛtɐ]; c. 1666 – 13 June 1734) was a German organist and composer.

== Biography ==
He was born in Herschdorf, in present-day Thuringia. In his Zur Geschichte des Orgelspiels (1884), August Gottfried Ritter gives 30, Oct. 1660 as birth date, and "nach 1740" as time of death.

Vetter first studied music with Georg Caspar Wecker in Nuremberg and was a student at the Rudolstadt Gymnasium from 1683 to 1688. He then moved to Erfurt to study with Johann Pachelbel, succeeding him as organist of the Predigerkirche when he left for Stuttgart in 1690; during this time, he may have attended the University of Erfurt. He was succeeded by J.H. Buttstedt in July 1691, when he went to Rudolstadt to take up a position as castle organist; he was later honoured with the appointments of Government Advocate, Church Procurator and Master Over The Page Boys.

His surviving compositions are now few, since World War II led to the destruction of all his free organ compositions and a work for chorus and orchestra entitled Zum frohen Empfang Grossherzogs Carl Fürsten Primas. The manuscript Mus.40035 of the Deutsche Staatsbibliothek, Berlin, gave his name as the composer of variations three and eight of the organ partita on "Allein Gott in der Höh sei Ehr", BWV 771, formerly attributed to J. S. Bach; he may most probably have been the composer of all seventeen verses.

His other surviving organ works, which are chorale settings in the tradition of the South German school, appear in the modern editions Orgelchoräle um Joh. Seb. Bach, ed. G. Frotscher (Leipzig, 1937), and Andreas Nicolaus Vetter (1666–1734): Koraalbewerkingen, ed. E. Kooiman (Hilversum, 1989). The manuscripts of many of these works were lost or destroyed in World War II.

== Selected works ==
Chorale preludes settings for organ on the following hymns:

- Ach Gott und Herr
- Ach Gott, vom Himmel sieh darein
- Allein Gott in der Höh sei Ehr (2 verses & fughetta)
- Allein Gott in der Höh sei Ehr (Choral-Partita), 17 variations; formerly attributed to J. S. Bach as BWV 771.
- Christ lag in Todesbanden (prelude & fughetta)
- Jesus Christus, unser Heiland, der den Tod überwand
- Jesu, meine Freude
- Komm, Heiliger Geist, Herre Gott
- Lobt Gott, ihr Christen allzugleich
- Nun komm, der Heiden Heiland
- Vater unser im Himmelreich

== Sources ==
- Hugh J. McLean, 'Vetter, (Andreas) Nicolaus', Grove Music Online ed. L. Macy (Accessed 2007-06-08)
