= Angelroda =

- Ortsteil of Martinroda
- Coat of arms
- Interactive map of Angelroda
- Location within Germany Location within Thuringia
- Coordinates: 50°44′41″N 10°52′3″E
- Country: Germany
- State: Thuringia
- District: Ilm-Kreis
- Municipality: Martinroda

Area
  - Total: 4.95 km^{2} (1.91 sq mi)
- Elevation: 385 m (1,263 ft)

Population (2018-12-31)
  - Total: 377
  - Density: 76.2/km^{2} (197/sq mi)
- Time zone: UTC+01:00 (CET)
  - Summer (DST): UTC+02:00 (CEST)
- Postal codes: 99338
- Dialling codes: 036207
- Vehicle registration: IK
- Website: geratal.de

Angelroda (German pronunciation: [aŋəlˈʁoːda]) is a village and a former municipality in the district Ilm-Kreis, in Thuringia, Germany founded in 958. Since December 2019, it is part of the municipality Martinroda.
