= Psalm 114 =

114th psalm of the Book of Psalms

- "When Israel went out of Egypt"
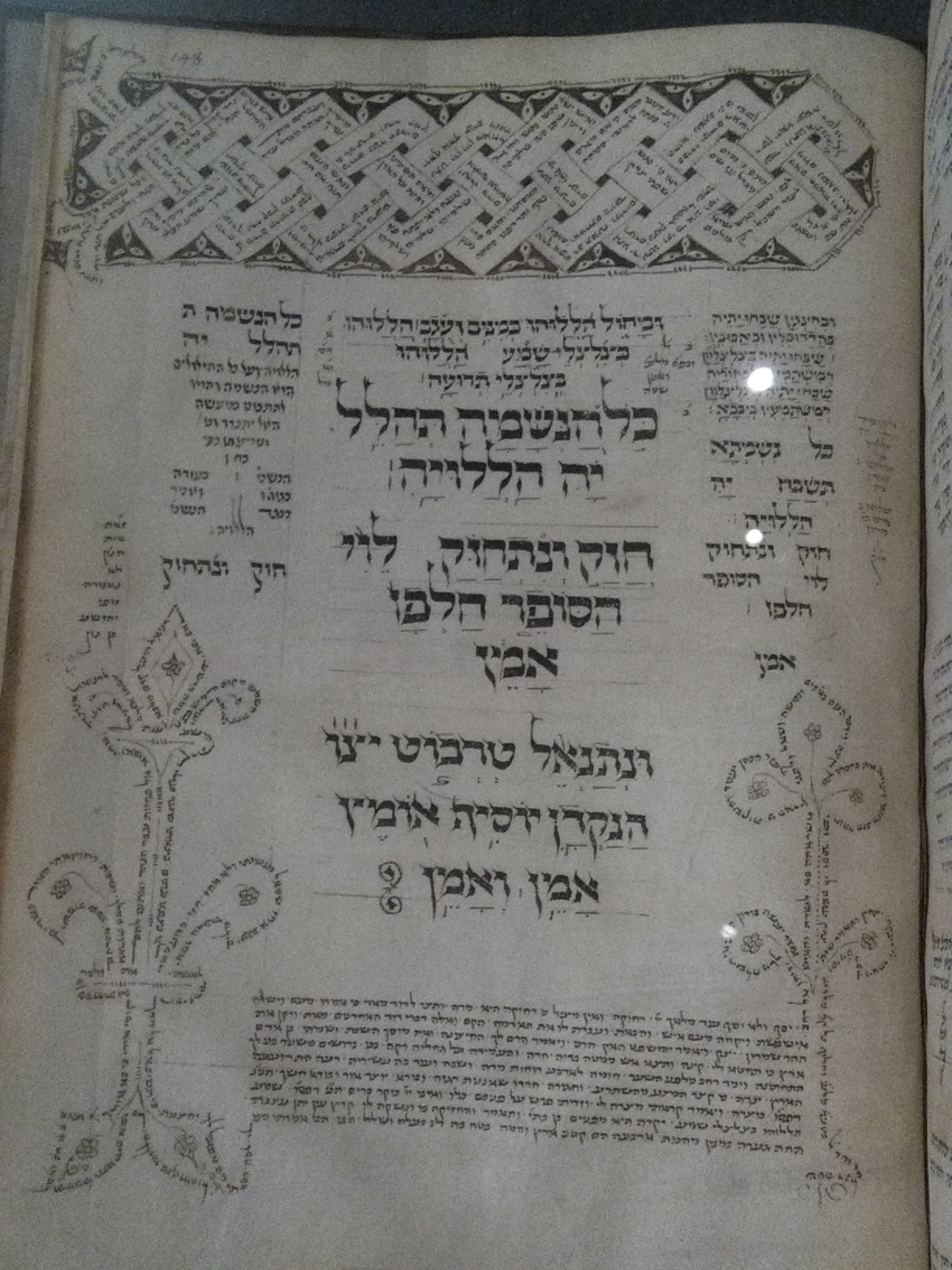
- Psalm 114 in a Hebrew Psalter from Northern Italy, ca. 1470
- Other name: Psalm 113; "In exitu Israel de Aegypto "
- Language: Hebrew (original)

Psalm 114
- ← Psalm 113 Psalm 115 →
- Book: Book of Psalms
- Hebrew Bible part: Ketuvim
- Order in the Hebrew part: 1
- Category: Sifrei Emet
- Christian Bible part: Old Testament
- Order in the Christian part: 19

Psalm 114 is the 114th psalm of the Book of Psalms, beginning in English in the King James Version: "When Israel went out of Egypt". In the slightly different numbering system in the Greek Septuagint and the Latin Vulgate version of the Bible, this psalm forms the first part of Psalm 113, verses 1–8. In Latin, it is known as "In exitu Israel de Aegypto".

Psalm 114 is used as a regular part of Jewish, Eastern Orthodox, Catholic, Lutheran, Anglican and various Protestant liturgies. It has often been set to music, such as a setting in German by Heinrich Schütz for three four-part choirs of voices and instruments, and Bach's early wedding cantata Der Herr denket an uns, BWV 196. During the Romantic period, Felix Mendelssohn set the psalm in German, Gustav Holst in English, and Albert Kellermann in Hebrew.

== Structure and theme ==
At eight verses, this psalm is comparatively concise. It is composed of four stanzas of two lines, which the word Jacob envelops. The two central stanzas evoke with images full of life the miracle of the Red Sea and the passage of the Jordan. God is evoked only at the end of the Psalm, doubtless to arouse the expectation.

Psalm 114 begins with the Hebrew 'בְּצֵאת יִשְׂרָאֵל, מִמִּצְרָיִם; בֵּית יַעֲקֹב, מֵעַם לֹעֵז'. It is one of the so-called Egyptian Hallel prayers, although it is sometimes ascribed to King David.

== Uses ==
=== Judaism ===
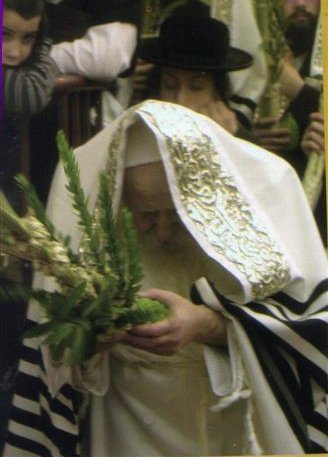
The Tosher Rebbe of Montreal, Quebec, Canada shaking the Four species during Sukkot while praying Hallel.

- Is one of six psalms (113–118) of which Hallel is composed. On all days when Hallel is recited, this psalm is recited in its entirety.
- Is recited on the first and/or eighth days of Passover in some traditions.

=== Christianity ===
Since the sixth century, the psalm has been used as a reading at Christian burial services, and also in ministry to those who are dying. It has also been read at Easter Day services, as Israel's deliverance from slavery is seen as a metaphor for deliverance from sin.

==== Protestant Christianity ====
In the Revised Common Lectionary, the Psalm appears in Year A on the seventeenth Sunday after Pentecost.

==== Orthodox Christianity ====
In Slavic and Greek Orthodox churches, it is sung as an antiphon for the feast of Theophany, for the following Sunday and for Palm Sunday.

==== Catholic ====
St. Benedict of Nursia chose this psalm as one of the psalms sung for the offices of Vespers. Since the early Middle Ages, Psalm 114 has been performed at the office of Vespers on Monday, according to the Rule of St. Benedict (AD 530).

In the Liturgy of the Hours today, the first part of Psalm 114 is sung or recited on Vespers Sunday. It is the only psalm traditionally chanted using Tonus peregrinus.

=== Book of Common Prayer ===
In the Church of England's Book of Common Prayer, this psalm is appointed to be read on the evening of the twenty-third day of the month, as well as at Evensong on Easter Day.

=== Literature ===
- John Milton wrote "A Paraphrase on Psalm 114" among his poems of 1645.
- Part of the psalm is quoted at the beginning of Dante's Purgatorio.

== Musical settings ==
Heinrich Schütz composed a metred paraphrase of Psalm 115 in German, "Nicht uns, nicht uns, Herr, lieber Gott", SWV 213, for the Becker Psalter, published first in 1628.

Gilles Binchois, wrote a motet In exitu Israel (date unknown).

Antoine-Esprit Blanchard wrote a grand motet, In exitu Israel, in 1749.

Jean-Joseph Cassanéa de Mondonville wrote a grand motet, In exitu Israel, in 1755.

François Giroust wrote a grand motet, In exitu Israel in 1783.

Antonio Vivaldi set the psalm as a motet, In exitu Israel, RV 604.

Samuel Wesley wrote a motet, In exitu Israel, for mixed chorus and organ.

Jan Dismas Zelenka composed two settings, ZWV 83 and ZWV 84, both scored for SATB soloists and chorus, two oboes, strings and continuo (1725 and 1728).

== Mandaean parallels ==
In Mandaeism, Qulasta prayer 75 and Right Ginza 5.2 have many parallels with Psalm 114.

== Text ==
The following table shows the Hebrew text of the Psalm with vowels, alongside the Koine Greek text in the Septuagint and the English translation from the King James Version. Note that the meaning can slightly differ between these versions, as the Septuagint and the Masoretic Text come from different textual traditions. (Note: A 1917 translation directly from Hebrew to English by the Jewish Publication Society can be found here or here, and an 1844 translation directly from the Septuagint by L. C. L. Brenton can be found here. Both translations are in the public domain.) In the Septuagint, this is the first part of Psalm 113, with the rest of Psalm 113 being Psalm 115 in the Masoretic numbering.

#	Hebrew	English	Greek
1	בְּצֵ֣את יִ֭שְׂרָאֵל מִמִּצְרָ֑יִם בֵּ֥ית יַ֝עֲקֹ֗ב מֵעַ֥ם לֹעֵֽז׃	When Israel went out of Egypt, the house of Jacob from a people of strange language;	᾿Αλληλούϊα. - ΕΝ ΕΞΟΔῼ ᾿Ισραὴλ ἐξ Αἰγύπτου, οἴκου ᾿Ιακὼβ ἐκ λαοῦ βαρβάρου,
2	הָיְתָ֣ה יְהוּדָ֣ה לְקׇדְשׁ֑וֹ יִ֝שְׂרָאֵ֗ל מַמְשְׁלוֹתָֽיו׃	Judah was his sanctuary, and Israel his dominion.	ἐγενήθη ᾿Ιουδαία ἁγίασμα αὐτοῦ, ᾿Ισραὴλ ἐξουσία αὐτοῦ.
3	הַיָּ֣ם רָ֭אָה וַיָּנֹ֑ס הַ֝יַּרְדֵּ֗ן יִסֹּ֥ב לְאָחֽוֹר׃	The sea saw it, and fled: Jordan was driven back.	ἡ θάλασσα εἶδε καὶ ἔφυγεν, ὁ ᾿Ιορδάνης ἐστράφη εἰς τὰ ὀπίσω·
4	הֶ֭הָרִים רָקְד֣וּ כְאֵילִ֑ים גְּ֝בָע֗וֹת כִּבְנֵי־צֹֽאן׃	The mountains skipped like rams, and the little hills like lambs.	τὰ ὄρη ἐσκίρτησαν ὡσεὶ κριοὶ καὶ οἱ βουνοὶ ὡς ἀρνία προβάτων.
5	מַה־לְּךָ֣ הַ֭יָּם כִּ֣י תָנ֑וּס הַ֝יַּרְדֵּ֗ן תִּסֹּ֥ב לְאָחֽוֹר׃	What ailed thee, O thou sea, that thou fleddest? thou Jordan, that thou wast driven back?	τί σοί ἐστι, θάλασσα, ὅτι ἔφυγες, καὶ σύ, ᾿Ιορδάνη, ὅτι ἐστράφης εἰς τὰ ὀπίσω;
6	הֶ֭הָרִים תִּרְקְד֣וּ כְאֵילִ֑ים גְּ֝בָע֗וֹת כִּבְנֵי־צֹֽאן׃	Ye mountains, that ye skipped like rams; and ye little hills, like lambs?	τὰ ὄρη, ὅτι ἐσκιρτήσατε ὡσεὶ κριοί, καὶ οἱ βουνοὶ ὡς ἀρνία προβάτων;
7	מִלִּפְנֵ֣י אָ֭דוֹן ח֣וּלִי אָ֑רֶץ מִ֝לִּפְנֵ֗י אֱל֣וֹהַּ יַעֲקֹֽב׃	Tremble, thou earth, at the presence of the LORD, at the presence of the God of Jacob;	ἀπὸ προσώπου Κυρίου ἐσαλεύθη ἡ γῆ, ἀπὸ προσώπου τοῦ Θεοῦ ᾿Ιακὼβ
8	הַהֹפְכִ֣י הַצּ֣וּר אֲגַם־מָ֑יִם חַ֝לָּמִ֗ישׁ לְמַעְיְנוֹ־מָֽיִם׃	Which turned the rock into a standing water, the flint into a fountain of waters.	τοῦ στρέψαντος τὴν πέτραν εἰς λίμνας ὑδάτων καὶ τὴν ἀκρότομον εἰς πηγὰς ὑδάτων.

=== Verses 1–2 ===
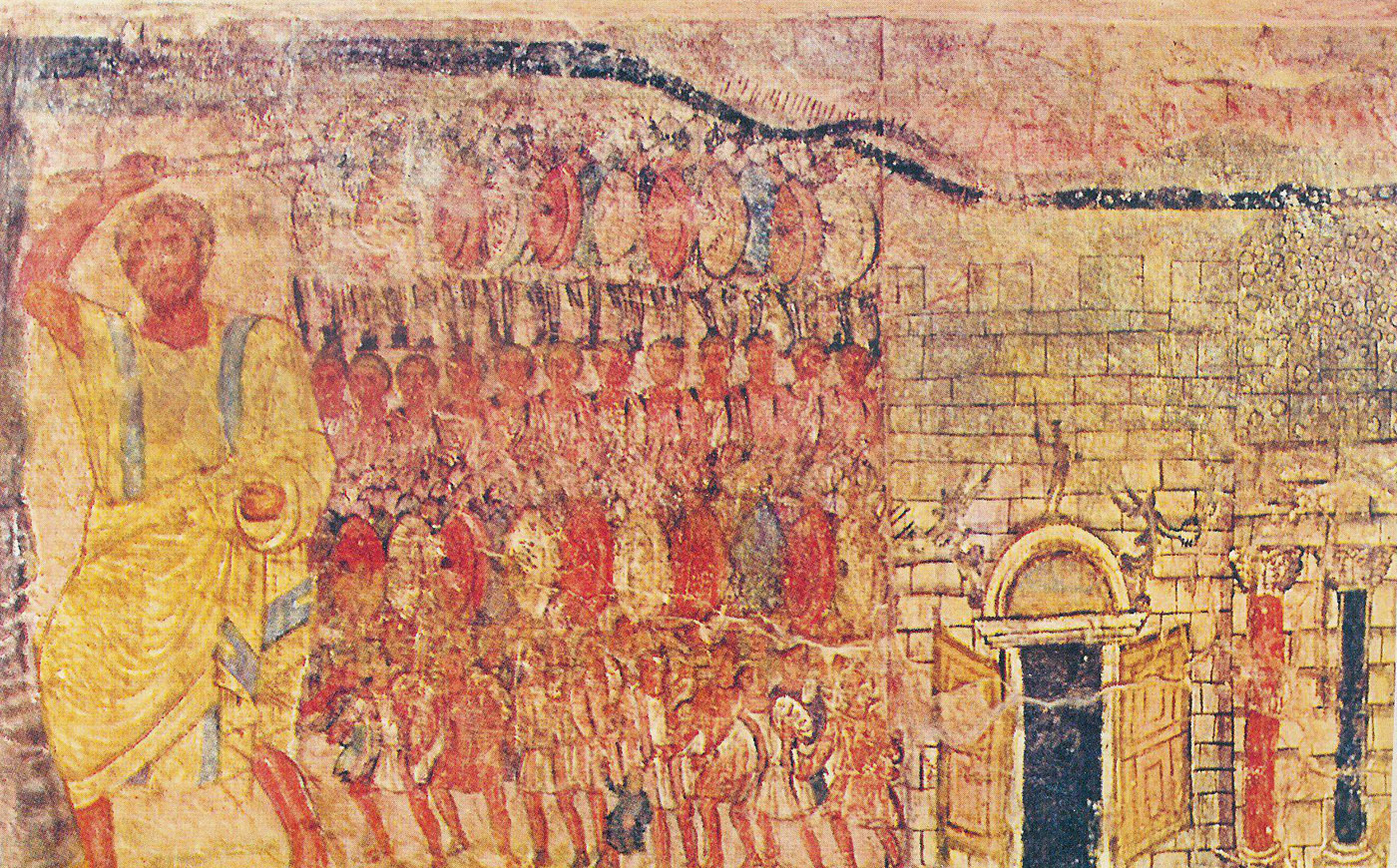
The Hebrew people leaving Egypt, led by Moses, on a mural in the synagogue of Doura Europos, in Syria.

^{1}When Israel went out of Egypt,
The house of Jacob from a people of strange language,
^{2}Judah became His sanctuary,
And Israel His dominion.

This first stanza recalls that the Hebrew people are born in the Exodus from Egypt. The words "sanctuary" and "dominion" ("domain" in the New Catholic Bible) designate the entire Holy Land, the inheritance of God, not only in the geographical sense but also in a spiritual sense. The miracles that allow Israel to cross the Red Sea and cross the Jordan River are poetically enhanced by the process of hyperbole and by images evoking a life of natural elements, water and mountains. It is a means of manifesting all creation with Israel and actively participating in its march towards the Promised Land.
