= Rockhausen =

- Ortsteil of Amt Wachsenburg
- Interactive map of Rockhausen
- Location within Germany Location within Thuringia
- Coordinates: 50°54′7″N 11°2′26″E
- Country: Germany
- State: Thuringia
- District: Ilm-Kreis
- Municipality: Amt Wachsenburg

Area
  - Total: 4.01 km^{2} (1.55 sq mi)
- Elevation: 300 m (980 ft)

Population (2018-12-31)
  - Total: 276
  - Density: 68.8/km^{2} (178/sq mi)
- Time zone: UTC+01:00 (CET)
  - Summer (DST): UTC+02:00 (CEST)
- Postal codes: 99102
- Dialling codes: 0361
- Vehicle registration: IK
- Website: Rockhausen

Rockhausen (German pronunciation: [ʁɔkˈhaʊzn̩]) is a village and a former municipality in the district Ilm-Kreis, in Thuringia, Germany. Since December 2019, it is part of the municipality Amt Wachsenburg.
