= Martinroda, Ilm-Kreis =

Martinroda
- Municipality
- Coat of arms

- Location of Martinroda within Ilm-Kreis district
- Interactive map of Martinroda
- Location within Germany Location within Thuringia
- Coordinates: 50°43′30″N 10°53′16″E
- Country: Germany
- State: Thuringia
- District: Ilm-Kreis
- Municipal assoc.: Geratal/Plaue

Government
  - Mayor (2022–28): Babett Morgenbrod

Area
  - Total: 13.23 km^{2} (5.11 sq mi)
- Elevation: 400 m (1,300 ft)

Population (2025-12-31)
  - Total: 1,136
  - Density: 85.87/km^{2} (222.4/sq mi)
- Time zone: UTC+01:00 (CET)
  - Summer (DST): UTC+02:00 (CEST)
- Postal codes: 98693
- Dialling codes: 03677
- Vehicle registration: IK
- Website: geratal.de

Martinroda (German pronunciation: [maʁtiːnˈʁoːda]) is a municipality in the district Ilm-Kreis, in Thuringia, Germany. The former municipality Angelroda was merged into Martinroda in December 2019.

== See also ==
Media related to Martinroda at Wikimedia Commons

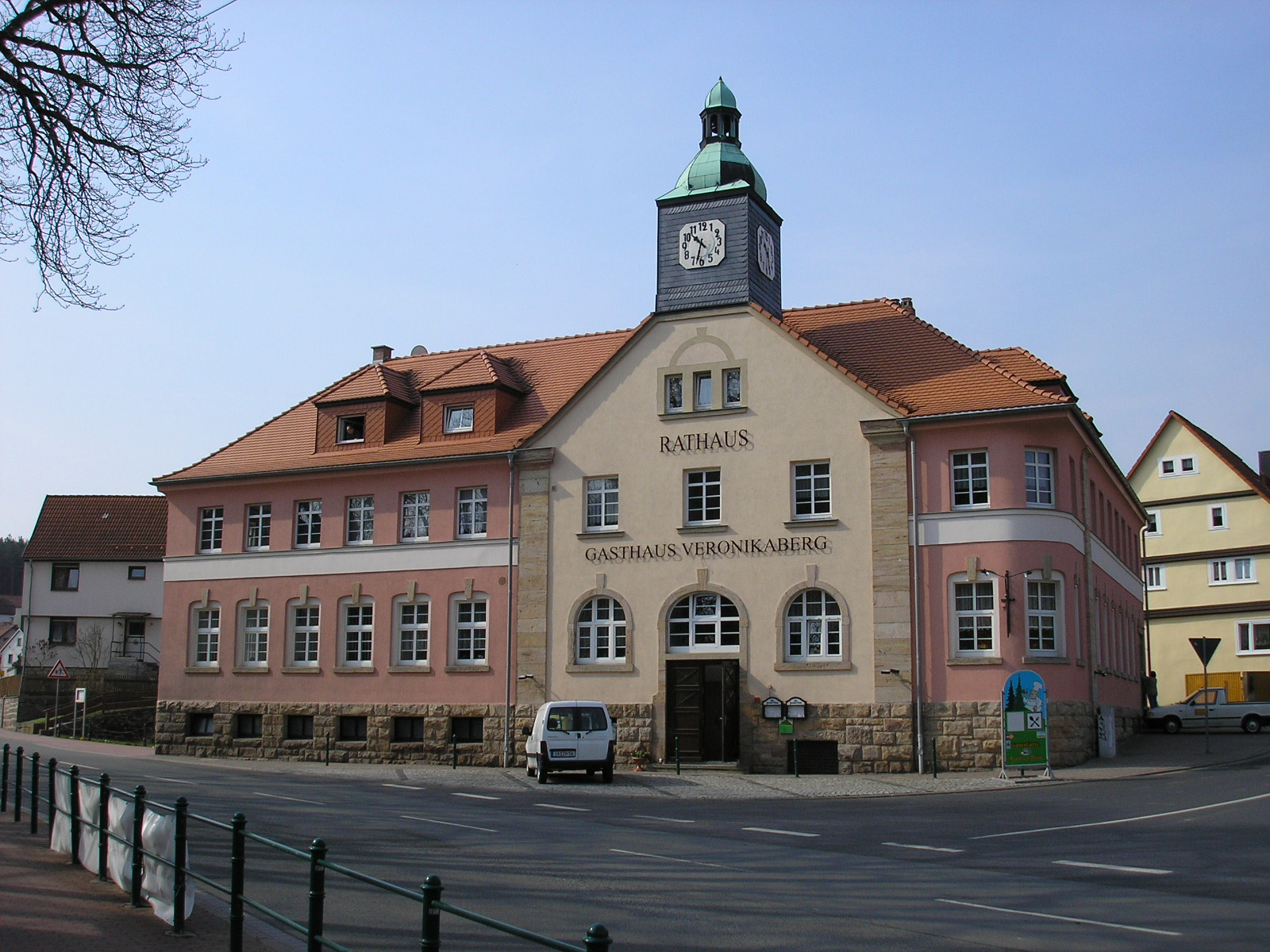
Town hall
