= Friedersdorf, Thuringia =

Friedersdorf
- Ortsteil of Großbreitenbach
- Coat of arms
- Interactive map of Friedersdorf
- Location within Germany Location within Thuringia
- Coordinates: 50°36′16″N 11°2′8″E
- Country: Germany
- State: Thuringia
- District: Ilm-Kreis
- Town: Großbreitenbach

Area
  - Total: 3.11 km^{2} (1.20 sq mi)
- Elevation: 570 m (1,870 ft)

Population (2017-12-31)
  - Total: 195
  - Density: 62.7/km^{2} (162/sq mi)
- Time zone: UTC+01:00 (CET)
  - Summer (DST): UTC+02:00 (CEST)
- Postal codes: 98701
- Dialling codes: 036781
- Vehicle registration: IK

Friedersdorf (German pronunciation: [ˈfʁiːdɐsˌdɔʁf]) is a village and a former municipality in the district Ilm-Kreis, in Thuringia, Germany. Since 1 January 2019, it is part of the town Großbreitenbach.
