= Psalm 115 =

115th psalm of the Book of Psalms

- "Not unto us, O LORD, not unto us, but unto thy name give glory"
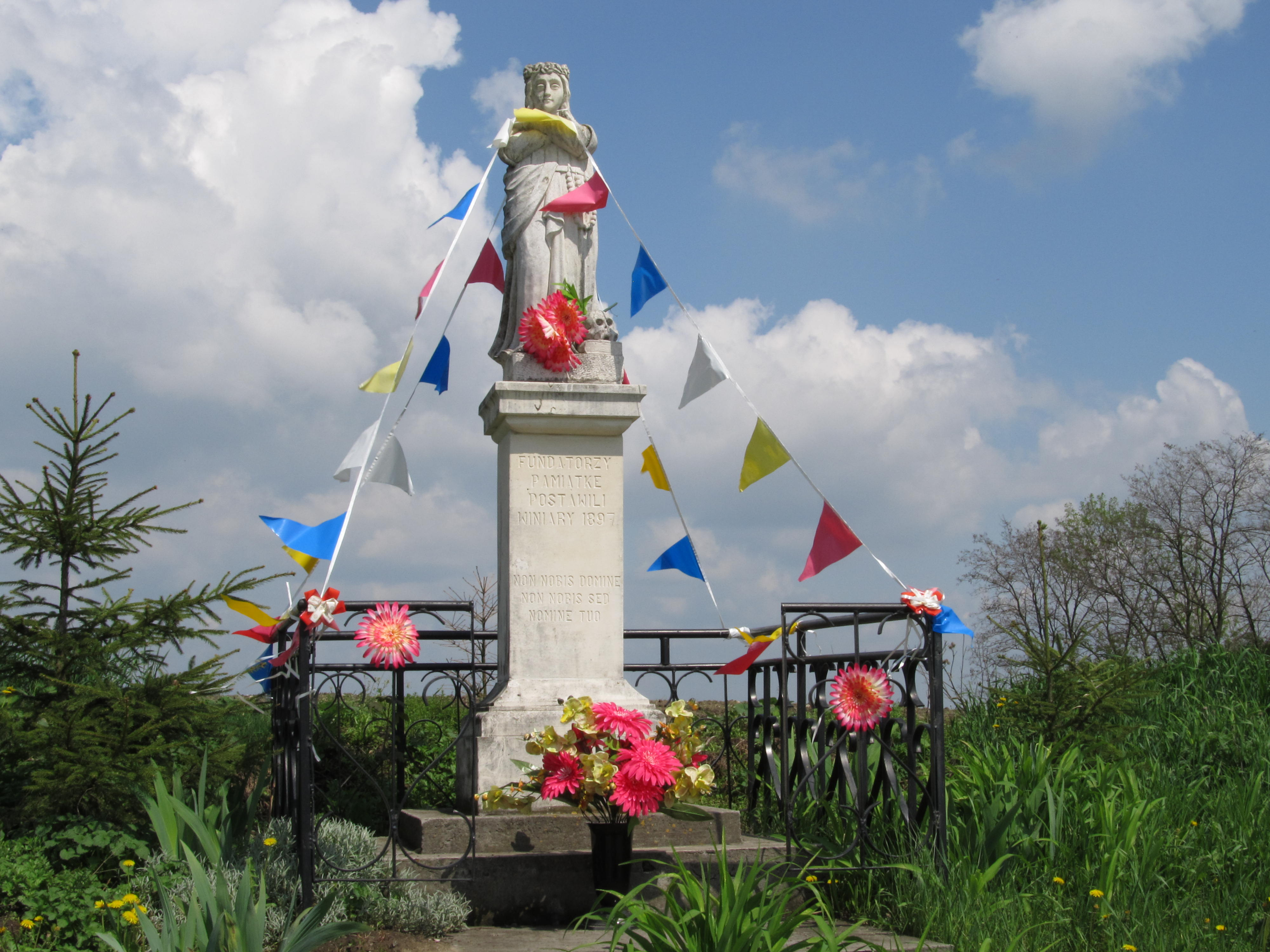
- Statue in Winiary, Pińczów County, Poland, with an inscription from Psalm 115:1
- Other name: Psalm 113; "Non nobis"
- Language: Hebrew (original)

Psalm 115
- ← Psalm 114 Psalm 116 →
- Book: Book of Psalms
- Hebrew Bible part: Ketuvim
- Order in the Hebrew part: 1
- Category: Sifrei Emet
- Christian Bible part: Old Testament
- Order in the Christian part: 19

Psalm 115 is the 115th psalm of the Book of Psalms in the Hebrew Bible, beginning in English in the King James Version of the Christian Bible: "Not unto us, O LORD, not unto us, but unto thy Name give glory". It is part of the Egyptian Hallel sequence in the fifth division of the Book of Psalms.

In the slightly different numbering system in the Greek Septuagint and the Latin Vulgate version of the Bible, this psalm forms the second part of Psalm 113, counted as verses 9–26 of Psalm 113, with verses 1–8 being Psalm 114 in Hebrew numbering. In Latin, that part is known as "non nobis".

According to Alexander Kirkpatrick, Psalm 115 "was probably composed for use in the [Second] Temple services after the Return from Babylon", perhaps when the first flush of enthusiasm had died away and the little community in Jerusalem realised how weak it was in the eyes of its neighbours.

The beginning has been used for building inscriptions, such as the Ca' Vendramin Calergi. Verse 16 ("The earth has been given to the children of men"), among other things, motivated John McConnell to create Earth Day.

Psalm 115 is used as a regular part of Jewish, Eastern Orthodox, Catholic, Lutheran, Anglican, and various Protestant liturgies. It has often been set to music, such as a setting in German by Heinrich Schütz for three four-part choirs of voices and instruments, and Bach's early wedding cantata Der Herr denket an uns, BWV 196. During the Romantic period, Felix Mendelssohn set the psalm in German, Gustav Holst in English, and Albert Kellermann in Hebrew.

== Uses ==
=== In Judaism ===
Psalm 115 is one of six psalms (113–118) of which Hallel is composed. On all days when Hallel is recited, this psalm is recited in its entirety, except on Rosh Chodesh and the last six days of Passover, when only verses 1–11 are recited. Verse 18 is the final verse of Ashrei. It is also recited by some Jews following Psalm 126 preceding Birkat Hamazon.

=== In Christianity ===
The Latin hymn "Non nobis" is based on Psalm 115. Several clergymen chose the beginning for their motto as an expression of humility, including the Italian archbishop Giuseppe Siri and the Filipino archbishop José S. Palma. The first verse in Latin, "Non Nobis Domine" became the motto of the Knights Templar.

=== Other uses ===
The beginning has been used for inscriptions on buildings, notably the Venetian Ca' Vendramin Calergi which is even known by the Latin "Non Nobis Domine". Psalm 113 in the Vulgate numbering is said to have been used as a memorial and thanksgiving by Henry V after the Battle of Agincourt:

The king … gathering his armie togither, gaue thanks to almightie God for so happie a victorie; causing his prelats and chapleins to sing this psalme: ‘In exitu Israel de Aegypto’: and commanded euerie man to kneele downe on the ground at this verse: ‘Non nobis, Domine, non nobis, sed nomini tuo da gloriam’.

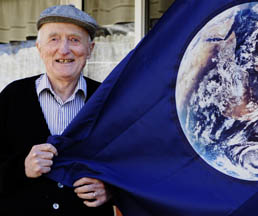
John McConnell with an Earth flag he created, in 2008

Verse 16, "The earth has been given to the children of men", is used by the philosopher John Locke in his argument that the whole human race holds the natural world in common ownership, at the start of his argument for the right of individuals to own personal property, and it was quoted by peace activist John McConnell as an inspiration to create Earth Day, as a call to preserve the Earth and to share resources.

== Music ==
In his collection Psalmen Davids of psalms, hymns and motets, Heinrich Schütz set Psalm 115 in German "Nicht uns, Herr", for three four-part choirs of voices and instruments, SWV 43. Schütz also set a metric poem for the Becker Psalter, "Nicht uns, nicht uns, Herr, lieber Gott", SWV 213.

Johann Sebastian Bach based his early wedding cantata Der Herr denket an uns, BWV 196, on verses 12 to 15 of Psalm 115 which speak of God's blessing especially for families.

Joseph Haydn wrote a four-part setting of the first verse in Latin for choir a cappella as an offertory hymn, published by Carus in 2009. In 1835, Felix Mendelssohn set Psalm 115 in German, Nicht unserm Namen, Herr, Op. 31, for soprano solo, SATB choir and orchestra. Gustav Holst wrote a setting in English, "Not Unto Us, O Lord", for mixed chorus and organ or piano in the 1890s.

Albert Kellermann included Psalm 115 in a collection of Sechs liturgische Psalmen (6 liturgical psalms) in 1913, setting them in Hebrew for choir, soloists and organ. When Siegfried Matthus wrote the libretto to his opera Judith, based on Friedrich Hebbel's Judith and premiered in 1985, he included verses from the Old Testament including Psalm 115. Gerald Cohen set the psalm in Hebrew for SATB chorus and piano in 1987.

== Text ==
The following table shows the Hebrew text of the Psalm with vowels, alongside the Koine Greek text in the Septuagint and the English translation from the King James Version. Note that the meaning can slightly differ between these versions, as the Septuagint and the Masoretic Text come from different textual traditions. (Note: A 1917 translation directly from Hebrew to English by the Jewish Publication Society can be found here or here, and an 1844 translation directly from the Septuagint by L. C. L. Brenton can be found here. Both translations are in the public domain.) In the Septuagint, this is the second part of Psalm 113, with its first part being Psalm 114 in the Masoretic numbering.

#	Hebrew	English	Greek
1	לֹ֤א לָ֥נוּ יְהֹוָ֗ה לֹ֫א־לָ֥נוּ כִּֽי־לְ֭שִׁמְךָ תֵּ֣ן כָּב֑וֹד עַל־חַ֝סְדְּךָ֗ עַל־אֲמִתֶּֽךָ׃	Not unto us, O LORD, not unto us, but unto thy name give glory, for thy mercy, and for thy truth's sake.	μὴ ἡμῖν, Κύριε, μὴ ἡμῖν, ἀλλ᾿ ἢ τῷ ὀνόματί σου δὸς δόξαν, ἐπὶ τῷ ἐλέει σου καὶ τῇ ἀληθείᾳ σου,
2	לָ֭מָּה יֹאמְר֣וּ הַגּוֹיִ֑ם אַיֵּה־נָ֝֗א אֱלֹהֵיהֶֽם׃	Wherefore should the heathen say, Where is now their God?	μήποτε εἴπωσι τὰ ἔθνη· ποῦ ἐστιν ὁ Θεὸς αὐτῶν;
3	וֵאלֹהֵ֥ינוּ בַשָּׁמָ֑יִם כֹּ֖ל אֲשֶׁר־חָפֵ֣ץ עָשָֽׂה׃	But our God is in the heavens: he hath done whatsoever he hath pleased.	ὁ δὲ Θεὸς ἡμῶν ἐν τῷ οὐρανῷ καὶ ἐν τῇ γῇ πάντα, ὅσα ἠθέλησεν, ἐποίησε.
4	עֲֽ֭צַבֵּיהֶם כֶּ֣סֶף וְזָהָ֑ב מַ֝עֲשֵׂ֗ה יְדֵ֣י אָדָֽם׃	Their idols are silver and gold, the work of men's hands.	τὰ εἴδωλα τῶν ἐθνῶν, ἀργύριον καὶ χρυσίον, ἔργα χειρῶν ἀνθρώπων·
5	פֶּֽה־לָ֭הֶם וְלֹ֣א יְדַבֵּ֑רוּ עֵינַ֥יִם לָ֝הֶ֗ם וְלֹ֣א יִרְאֽוּ׃	They have mouths, but they speak not: eyes have they, but they see not:	στόμα ἔχουσι, καὶ οὐ λαλήσουσιν, ὀφθαλμοὺς ἔχουσι, καὶ οὐκ ὄψονται,
6	אׇזְנַ֣יִם לָ֭הֶם וְלֹ֣א יִשְׁמָ֑עוּ אַ֥ף לָ֝הֶ֗ם וְלֹ֣א יְרִיחֽוּן׃	They have ears, but they hear not: noses have they, but they smell not:	ὦτα ἔχουσι, καὶ οὐκ ἀκούσονται, ῥῖνας ἔχουσι, καὶ οὐκ ὀσφρανθήσονται,
7	יְדֵיהֶ֤ם ׀ וְלֹ֬א יְמִישׁ֗וּן רַ֭גְלֵיהֶם וְלֹ֣א יְהַלֵּ֑כוּ לֹא־יֶ֝הְגּ֗וּ בִּגְרוֹנָֽם׃	They have hands, but they handle not: feet have they, but they walk not: neither speak they through their throat.	χεῖρας ἔχουσι, καὶ οὐ ψηλαφήσουσι, πόδας ἔχουσι καὶ οὐ περιπατήσουσιν, οὐ φωνήσουσιν ἐν τῷ λάρυγγι αὐτῶν.
8	כְּ֭מוֹהֶם יִהְי֣וּ עֹשֵׂיהֶ֑ם כֹּ֖ל אֲשֶׁר־בֹּטֵ֣חַ בָּהֶֽם׃	They that make them are like unto them; so is every one that trusteth in them.	ὅμοιοι αὐτοῖς γένοιντο οἱ ποιοῦντες αὐτὰ καὶ πάντες οἱ πεποιθότες ἐπ᾿ αὐτοῖς.
9	יִ֭שְׂרָאֵל בְּטַ֣ח בַּיהֹוָ֑ה עֶזְרָ֖ם וּמָגִנָּ֣ם הֽוּא׃	O Israel, trust thou in the LORD: he is their help and their shield.	οἶκος ᾿Ισραὴλ ἤλπισεν ἐπὶ Κύριον· βοηθὸς καὶ ὑπερασπιστὴς αὐτῶν ἐστιν.
10	בֵּ֣ית אַ֭הֲרֹן בִּטְח֣וּ בַיהֹוָ֑ה עֶזְרָ֖ם וּמָגִנָּ֣ם הֽוּא׃	O house of Aaron, trust in the LORD: he is their help and their shield.	οἶκος ᾿Ααρὼν ἤλπισεν ἐπὶ Κύριον· βοηθὸς καὶ ὑπερασπιστὴς αὐτῶν ἐστιν.
11	יִרְאֵ֣י יְ֭הֹוָה בִּטְח֣וּ בַיהֹוָ֑ה עֶזְרָ֖ם וּמָגִנָּ֣ם הֽוּא׃	Ye that fear the LORD, trust in the LORD: he is their help and their shield.	οἱ φοβούμενοι τὸν Κύριον ἤλπισαν ἐπὶ Κύριον· βοηθὸς καὶ ὑπερασπιστὴς αὐτῶν ἐστιν.
12	יְהֹוָה֮ זְכָרָ֢נוּ יְבָ֫רֵ֥ךְ יְ֭בָרֵךְ אֶת־בֵּ֣ית יִשְׂרָאֵ֑ל יְ֝בָרֵ֗ךְ אֶת־בֵּ֥ית אַהֲרֹֽן׃	The LORD hath been mindful of us: he will bless us; he will bless the house of Israel; he will bless the house of Aaron.	Κύριος μνησθεὶς ἡμῶν εὐλόγησεν ἡμᾶς, εὐλόγησε τὸν οἶκον ᾿Ισραήλ, εὐλόγησε τὸν οἶκον ᾿Ααρών,
13	יְ֭בָרֵךְ יִרְאֵ֣י יְהֹוָ֑ה הַ֝קְּטַנִּ֗ים עִם־הַגְּדֹלִֽים׃	He will bless them that fear the LORD, both small and great.	εὐλόγησε τοὺς φοβουμένους τὸν Κύριον, τοὺς μικροὺς μετὰ τῶν μεγάλων.
14	יֹסֵ֣ף יְהֹוָ֣ה עֲלֵיכֶ֑ם עֲ֝לֵיכֶ֗ם וְעַל־בְּנֵיכֶֽם׃	The LORD shall increase you more and more, you and your children.	προσθείη Κύριος ἐφ᾿ ὑμᾶς, ἐφ᾿ ὑμᾶς καὶ ἐπὶ τοὺς υἱοὺς ὑμῶν.
15	בְּרוּכִ֣ים אַ֭תֶּם לַיהֹוָ֑ה עֹ֝שֵׂ֗ה שָׁמַ֥יִם וָאָֽרֶץ׃	Ye are blessed of the LORD which made heaven and earth.	εὐλογημένοι ὑμεῖς τῷ Κυρίῳ τῷ ποιήσαντι τὸν οὐρανὸν καὶ τὴν γῆν.
16	הַשָּׁמַ֣יִם שָׁ֭מַיִם לַיהֹוָ֑ה וְ֝הָאָ֗רֶץ נָתַ֥ן לִבְנֵי־אָדָֽם׃	The heaven, even the heavens, are the LORD's: but the earth hath he given to the children of men.	ὁ οὐρανὸς τοῦ οὐρανοῦ τῷ Κυρίῳ, τὴν δὲ γῆν ἔδωκε τοῖς υἱοῖς τῶν ἀνθρώπων.
17	לֹ֣א הַ֭מֵּתִים יְהַֽלְלוּ־יָ֑הּ וְ֝לֹ֗א כׇּל־יֹרְדֵ֥י דוּמָֽה׃	The dead praise not the LORD, neither any that go down into silence.	οὐχ οἱ νεκροὶ αἰνέσουσί σε, Κύριε, οὐδὲ πάντες οἱ καταβαίνοντες εἰς ᾅδου,
18	וַאֲנַ֤חְנוּ ׀ נְבָ֘רֵ֤ךְ יָ֗הּ מֵעַתָּ֥ה וְעַד־עוֹלָ֗ם הַֽלְלוּ־יָֽהּ׃	But we will bless the LORD from this time forth and for evermore. Praise the LORD.	ἀλλ᾿ ἡμεῖς οἱ ζῶντες εὐλογήσομεν τὸν Κύριον, ἀπὸ τοῦ νῦν, καὶ ἕως τοῦ αἰῶνος.

=== Latin Vulgate ===
Following is the Latin text of Psalm 115 (113b):

Verse	Latin
1	Non nobis, Domine, non nobis, sed nomini tuo da gloriam super misericordia tua et veritate tua.
2	Quare dicent gentes: “Ubi est Deus eorum?”.
3	Deus autem noster in caelo; omnia, quaecumque voluit, fecit.
4	Simulacra gentium argentum et aurum, opera manuum hominum.
5	Os habent et non loquentur, oculos habent et non videbunt.
6	Aures habent et non audient, nares habent et non odorabunt.
7	Manus habent et non palpabunt, pedes habent et non ambulabunt; non clamabunt in gutture suo.
8	Similes illis erunt, qui faciunt ea, et omnes, qui confidunt in eis.
9	Domus Israel speravit in Domino: adiutorium eorum et scutum eorum est.
10	Domus Aaron speravit in Domino: adiutorium eorum et scutum eorum est.
11	Qui timent Dominum, speraverunt in Domino: adiutorium eorum et scutum eorum est.
12	Dominus memor fuit nostri et benedicet nobis: benedicet domui Israel, benedicet domui Aaron,
13	benedicet omnibus, qui timent Dominum, pusillis cum maioribus.
14	Adiciat Dominus super vos, super vos et super filios vestros.
15	Benedicti vos a Domino, qui fecit caelum et terram.
16	Caeli, caeli sunt Domino, terram autem dedit filiis hominum.
17	Non mortui laudabunt te, Domine, neque omnes, qui descendunt in silentium,
18	sed nos, qui vivimus, benedicimus Domino ex hoc nunc et usque in saeculum.

== Bibliography ==
- Scherman, Nosson; Zlotowitz, Rabbi Meir (2003). The Complete Artscroll Siddur. ArtScroll Mesorah Series. Translated by Scherman, Nosson (3 ed.). Mesorah Pubn Ltd. ISBN 978-0-89906-650-9.
