= Witzleben =

- Municipality
- Location of Witzleben within Ilm-Kreis district
- Interactive map of Witzleben
- Location within Germany Location within Thuringia
- Coordinates: 50°49′22″N 11°6′45″E
- Country: Germany
- State: Thuringia
- District: Ilm-Kreis
- Municipal assoc.: Riechheimer Berg
- Subdivisions: 3 Ortsteile

Government
  - Mayor (2022–28): Uwe Leuthardt (CDU)

Area
  - Total: 22.61 km^{2} (8.73 sq mi)
- Elevation: 365 m (1,198 ft)

Population (2025-12-31)
  - Total: 614
  - Density: 27.2/km^{2} (70.3/sq mi)
- Time zone: UTC+01:00 (CET)
  - Summer (DST): UTC+02:00 (CEST)
- Postal codes: 99310
- Dialling codes: 036200
- Vehicle registration: IK
- Website: vg-riechheimer-berg.de

Witzleben (German pronunciation: [ˈvɪtsleːbn̩]) is a municipality in the district Ilm-Kreis in Thuringia, Germany.
