= Gillersdorf =

- Ortsteil of Großbreitenbach
- Coat of arms
- Interactive map of Gillersdorf
- Location within Germany Location within Thuringia
- Coordinates: 50°36′23″N 11°1′1″E
- Country: Germany
- State: Thuringia
- District: Ilm-Kreis
- Town: Großbreitenbach

Area
  - Total: 3.83 km^{2} (1.48 sq mi)
- Elevation: 660 m (2,170 ft)

Population (2017-12-31)
  - Total: 244
  - Density: 63.7/km^{2} (165/sq mi)
- Time zone: UTC+01:00 (CET)
  - Summer (DST): UTC+02:00 (CEST)
- Postal codes: 98701
- Dialling codes: 036781
- Vehicle registration: IK

Gillersdorf (German pronunciation: [ˈɡɪlɐsˌdɔʁf]) is a village and a former municipality of the Ilm-Kreis district, in Thuringia, Germany. Since 1 January 2019, it has been part of the Großbreitenbach town.
