= Riechheimer Berg =

Municipality in Thuringia, Germany

- Verwaltungsgemeinschaft
- Map of Ilm-Kreis highlighting Riechheimer Berg
- Interactive map of Riechheimer Berg
- Location within Germany Location within Thuringia
- Coordinates: 50°51′N 11°03′E
- Country: Germany
- State: Thuringia
- District: Ilm-Kreis
- Seat: Osthausen-Wülfershausen
- Subdivisions: 7 municipalities

Area
  - Total: 95.04 km^{2} (36.70 sq mi)

Population (2025-12-31)
  - Total: 4,153
  - Density: 43.70/km^{2} (113.2/sq mi)
- Time zone: UTC+01:00 (CET)
  - Summer (DST): UTC+02:00 (CEST)
- Website: www.vg-riechheimer-berg.de

Riechheimer Berg is a Verwaltungsgemeinschaft ("collective municipality") in the district Ilm-Kreis, in Thuringia, Germany. The seat of the Verwaltungsgemeinschaft is in Osthausen-Wülfershausen.

The Verwaltungsgemeinschaft Riechheimer Berg consists of the following municipalities:

1. Alkersleben
2. Bösleben-Wüllersleben
3. Dornheim
4. Elleben
5. Elxleben
6. Osthausen-Wülfershausen
7. Witzleben
