= FCK Rolling Devils =

- Nickname: Rolling Red Devils
- Founded: September 2009
- Dissolved: October 2022
- Arena: Sports Hall of Schillerschule Kaiserslautern
- Location: Kaiserslautern (Rhineland-Palatinate, Germany)
- Team colors: Red/White/Black
- Championships: Regional Cup Winner 2010; Regional League Champion 2011; 2nd Federal League Champion 2014; Regional League Champion 2019
Home	Away

The FCK Rolling Devils was a wheelchair basketball club located in Kaiserslautern with German soccer club 1. FC Kaiserslautern acted as name sponsor till 2020. Their first team played in the Rollstuhlbasketball-Bundesliga from 2014 to 2016.

== History ==
The wheelchair basketball team of 1. FC Kaiserslautern was founded in September 2009 as a part of the club's basketball department. The Rolling Devils entered league play of the German Wheelchair Sports Federation in the season 2010/11 on the third-class Regional League (Central Conference) level. The team won the Regional Cup and advanced to the quarter-finals of the German National Cup. The Devils finished the season with the championship and promotion to the 2nd German Wheelchair Basketball Federal League (Southern Conference).

In the next two seasons, the Devils dropped from the German Wheelchair Sports Cup in the group stage but finished as runners-up in the 2nd Federal League. In 2013, the team participated for the German Wheelchair Sports Federation in the International Wheelchair Basketball Federation Euroleague 3 and finished in third place.

In March 2013, FCK Rolling Devils was re-established as a separate wheelchair basketball department. In 2013/14, the Rolling Devils again advanced to the quarter-finals of the German National Cup and, in the third attempt, won the championship in the 2nd German Federal League, thereby gaining promotion to the 1st German Federal League. In 2014/15, the Devils made it again to the quarter-finals of the German National Cup and finished their first season in the 1st German Federal League on rank 7 and thereby as the best-promoted team of the last four seasons.

In July 2015, the spin-off of FCK Rolling Devils as an independent club with 1.FC Kaiserslautern acting as name sponsor took place. The wheelchair basketball department at 1.FC Kaiserslautern was suspended at the club's annual general meeting in December 2015. In 2015/16, the Devils again made it to the quarter-finals of the German National Cup and finished the season on rank 7.

In August 2016, the club withdrew its first team from the 1st German Federal League for financial and sports reasons and continued league play with their second team in the third-class regional league. In the next two seasons, the Rolling Devils finished at rank 3. In the season 2018/19, the Devils won the championship and to be promoted to the 2nd German Wheelchair Basketball Federal League (Southern Conference), but decided to stay in the regional league for financial reasons. The season 2019/20 ended ahead of schedule due to the COVID-19 pandemic, and the Rolling Devils finished with several games less played than the other teams on rank 4. The COVID-19 pandemic also caused a massive decrease in sponsorship money that the Devils could not participate with a team in the season 2020/21. The club should have resumed training and match operations in the season 2021/22. In October 2022, the club was dissolved and removed from the Rhineland-Palatinate register of associations.

== Honors ==
=== National ===
- Regional Cup (Central Conference) Winner 2010
- Regional League (Central Conference) Champion 2011 (Regionalliga Mitte, 3rd division)
- 2nd Federal League (Southern Conference) Champion 2014
- Regional League (Central Conference) Champion 2019 (Regionalliga Mitte, 3rd division)

=== 2nd team ===
- First League (Central Conference) Champion 2014 (Oberliga Mitte, 4th division)
- Regional Cup (Central Conference) Winner 2014

== Season by season ==
Season	League	Position (Teams)	W	D	L	Points	Baskets	National cup competitions	International competitions
2010/11	Regional league (Central conference)	1 (8)	14	0	0	28:0	1228:428	Regional Cup: Winner; German Cup: quarter finals	
2011/12	2nd Federal League (Southern conference)	2 (8)	11	0	3	22:6	961:767	German Cup: group stage	
2012/13	2nd Federal League (Southern conference)	2 (8)	10	0	4	20:8	908:764	German Cup: group stage	IWBF EuroLeague 3: Position 3
2013/14	2nd Federal League (Southern conference)	1 (8)	14	0	0	28:0	1050:692	German Cup: quarter finals	
2014/15	1st Federal League	7 (10)	6	0	12	12:24	1042:1195	German Cup: quarter finals	
2015/16	1st Federal League	7 (10)	7	0	11	14:22	1206:1300	German Cup: quarter finals	
2016/17	1st Federal League	10 (10)	0	0	18	0:36	0:360		
2016/17	Regional league (Central conference)*	3(11)	15	0	5	30:10	1082:763		
2017/18	Regional league (Central conference)	3(7)	11	0	5	22:10	952:817		
2018/19	Regional league (Central conference)	1 (7)	16	0	2	32:4	986:801		
2019/20	Regional league (Central conference)**	4(11)	7	0	4	14:8	488:459		

(green highlighting: championship and promotion, blue highlighting: championship, red highlighting: relegation), *: FCK Rolling Devils 2, **: season end ahead of schedule

== Management ==
=== Team managers ===
Name	Period		Position
Name	from	till	Position
Christa Weber	September 2009	March 2013	managing director (within FCK department Basketball)
Sascha Gergele	March 2013	November 2014	department manager FCK Rolling Devils
Thomas Lorenz	November 2014	December 2015	department manager FCK Rolling Devils
Thomas Lorenz	July 2015	April 2016	president FCK Rolling Devils
Sascha Gergele	April 2016	October 2022	president FCK Rolling Devils

=== Head coaches ===
Name	Nationality	Period		Contract end
Name	Nationality	from	till	Contract end
Christa Weber	(Germany)	September 2009	March 2013	Withdrawal
Sven Nürnberger	(Germany)	April 2013	November 2013	Dismissal
Sebastian Spitznagel	(Germany)	November 2013	July 2014	Contract end
Manfred Mikschy	(Germany)	August 2014	October 2014	Withdrawal
Sascha Gergele	(Germany)	October 2014	November 2014	Interim coach
Clifford Fisher	(United States)	November 2014	November 2015	Termination
Paul James Capasso	(United States)	November 2015	March 2016	Contract end
Sascha Gergele	(Germany)	April 2016	March 2018	Contract end
Robin Kaltenbach	(Germany)	April 2018	Mai 2020	Contract end

== Notable players and coaches ==
=== Notable players ===
==== Former players ====
- Serdar Antac (2013 - 2015): German champion 2003, Willi Brinkmann Cup winner 2001, Turkish champion 2006, 2007, 2008 and 2009, IWBF Champions Cup winner 2008 and 2009, Kitakyushu Champions Cup winner 2008 and 2009, European champion (Group B) with Turkey 2006
- Janic Binda ( (Switzerland) , 2014 - 2016): Swiss champion 2009, 2010, 2011, 2012, 2013 and 2014, Swiss cup winner 2009, 2010, 2011, 2012, 2013 and 2014, Swiss international
- Paul James Capasso ( (United States) , 2014 - 2016): US champion 1993, 1995 and 2004, André Vergauwen Cup winner 2014, US international
- Nico Dreimüller ( (Germany) , 2010 - 2013): German champion 2015 and 2017, German cup winner 2015, 2017 and 2018, Champions cup winner 2015, German international
- Pieter Dries (2013 - 2015): European champion (Group B) with Belgium 2008, Belgian cup winner 2016
- Sascha Gergele ( (Germany) , 2009 - 2019): German champion 2003, Willi Brinkmann Cup winner 2001, German international
- Philipp Häfeli ( (Switzerland) , 2014 - 2015): Swiss champion 2010, 2011 and 2012, Swiss cup winner 2010, 2011 and 2012, German champion 2017, German cup winner 2017 and 2018, Swiss international
- Matthias Heimbach (2013 - 2016): German cup winner 2008, German champion 2009, IWBF Champions cup finalist 2010, European championship finalist with Germany 2011, German international
- Kai Möller ( (Germany) , 2015 - 2016): Italian champion 2013, Italian cup winner 2013, German cup winner 2018, German international
- Sebastian Spitznagel ( (Germany) , 2010 - 2014): German champion 2003, German international
- Klaus Weber ( (Germany) , 2009 - 2013): German champion 1994 and 2003, German cup winner 1993, Willi Brinkmann Cup winner 2001, German international
- Jacob Michael Williams ( (United States) , 2015 - 2016): US champion 2015, German champion 2018, 2019 and 2020, German cup winner 2019, Champions Cup winner 2018, US international

=== Notable coaches ===
- Christa Weber (2009 - 2013): German champion 1994, 1997 and 2003, German cup winner 1993, Willi Brinkmann Cup winner 2001, Coach of German women's national team, Coach of Germany women's under-19 national team
- Clifford Fisher ( (United States) , 2014 - 2015): Italian champion 2004, 2009 and 2010, Italian cup winner 2004, 2007 and 2010, Italian supercup winner 2008, Turkish champion 2011, André Vergauwen Cup winner 2004, Willy Brinkmann Cup winner 2008, European champion with Italy 2003 and 2005, Coach of Italian national team, Coach of Italian national under-22 team, Coach of Belgium national team
- Paul James Capasso ( (United States) , 2015 - 2016): André Vergauwen Cup winner 2014

== Miscellaneous ==
=== Naming ===
The naming in wheel chair basketball at 1.FC Kaiserslautern is influenced by the club's image from soccer: The team name Rolling Devils traces back to the nickname Red Devils of 1.FC Kaiserslautern's soccer team, the wheel chair basketball team like the club's professional soccer team also has a devil at mascot, and like the Fritz-Walter-Stadion in soccer, the home playing site of FCK Rolling Devils is commonly known as hell (of Kaiserslautern).

=== Fans ===
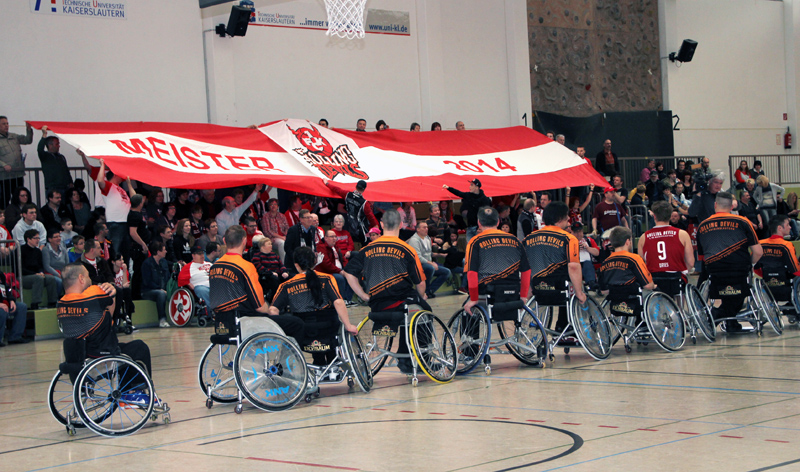
Supporters' choreography for the championship 2014

From 2012 to 2016, FCK Rolling Devils welcomed on average more than 250 spectators at their home games and were thereby one of the most visited wheel chair basketball teams in Germany. Devils fan culture has strong ties to 1.FC Kaiserslautern's club culture in soccer: the unofficial fan club Rolling Devils Supporters overlapped with soccer fan clubs and the fan culture featured many elements from soccer fandom.

=== Media ===
FCK Rolling Devils hosted a homepage, one of the most popular Facebook sites in German wheel chair basketball and from 2014 to 2016 also their own YouTube channel.

=== Awards ===
For their social commitment, FCK Rolling Devils in 2011 received the Stern des Sports (Star of Sports) in bronze from the German Olympic Sports Confederation and in 2013 the Brückenpreis (Bridge award) of the federal state Rhineland-Palatinate.
