= Pennewitz =

- Stadtteil of Ilmenau
- Coat of arms
- Interactive map of Pennewitz
- Location within Germany Location within Thuringia
- Coordinates: 50°39′37″N 11°3′23″E
- Country: Germany
- State: Thuringia
- District: Ilm-Kreis
- Town: Ilmenau

Area
  - Total: 5.48 km^{2} (2.12 sq mi)
- Elevation: 460 m (1,510 ft)

Population (2016-12-31)
  - Total: 476
  - Density: 86.9/km^{2} (225/sq mi)
- Time zone: UTC+01:00 (CET)
  - Summer (DST): UTC+02:00 (CEST)
- Postal codes: 98708
- Dialling codes: 036783
- Vehicle registration: IK
- Website: Pennewitz

Pennewitz (German pronunciation: [ˈpɛnəvɪts]) is a village and a former municipality in the district Ilm-Kreis, in Thuringia, Germany. Since July 2018, it is part of the town Ilmenau.
