= Böhlen, Thuringia =

Böhlen
- Ortsteil of Großbreitenbach
- Coat of arms
- Interactive map of Böhlen
- Location within Germany Location within Thuringia
- Coordinates: 50°35′16″N 11°2′36″E
- Country: Germany
- State: Thuringia
- District: Ilm-Kreis
- Town: Großbreitenbach

Area
  - Total: 6.16 km^{2} (2.38 sq mi)
- Elevation: 619 m (2,031 ft)

Population (2017-12-31)
  - Total: 542
  - Density: 88.0/km^{2} (228/sq mi)
- Time zone: UTC+01:00 (CET)
  - Summer (DST): UTC+02:00 (CEST)
- Postal codes: 98701
- Dialling codes: 036781
- Vehicle registration: IK
- Website: www.boehlen.de

Böhlen (German pronunciation: [ˈbøːlən]) is a village and a former municipality in the district Ilm-Kreis, in Thuringia, Germany. Since 1 January 2019, it is part of the town Großbreitenbach.
