= Altenfeld =

- Ortsteil of Großbreitenbach
- Coat of arms
- Interactive map of Altenfeld
- Location within Germany Location within Thuringia
- Coordinates: 50°33′53″N 10°57′39″E
- Country: Germany
- State: Thuringia
- District: Ilm-Kreis
- Town: Großbreitenbach

Area
  - Total: 17.05 km^{2} (6.58 sq mi)
- Elevation: 600 m (2,000 ft)

Population (2017-12-31)
  - Total: 927
  - Density: 54.4/km^{2} (141/sq mi)
- Time zone: UTC+01:00 (CET)
  - Summer (DST): UTC+02:00 (CEST)
- Postal codes: 98701
- Dialling codes: 036781
- Vehicle registration: IK
- Website: www.altenfeld-online.com

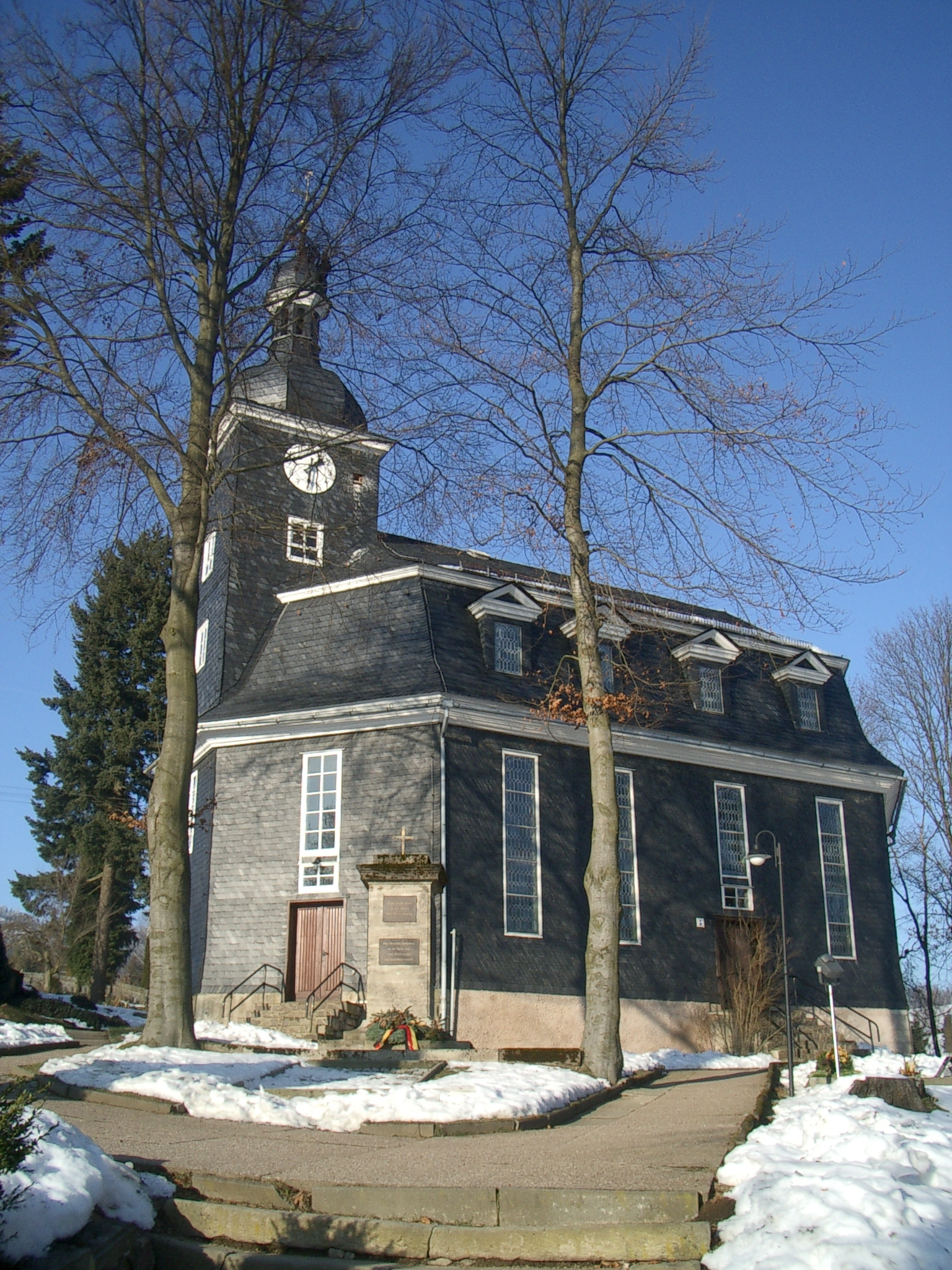
A church in Altenfeld

Altenfeld (German pronunciation: [ˈaltn̩fɛlt]) is a village and a former municipality in the district Ilm-Kreis, in Thuringia, Germany. Since 1 January 2019, it is part of the town Großbreitenbach.
