= Der Herr denket an uns, BWV 196 =

Church cantata by J. S. Bach

Der Herr denket an uns
- BWV 196
- Church cantata by J. S. Bach
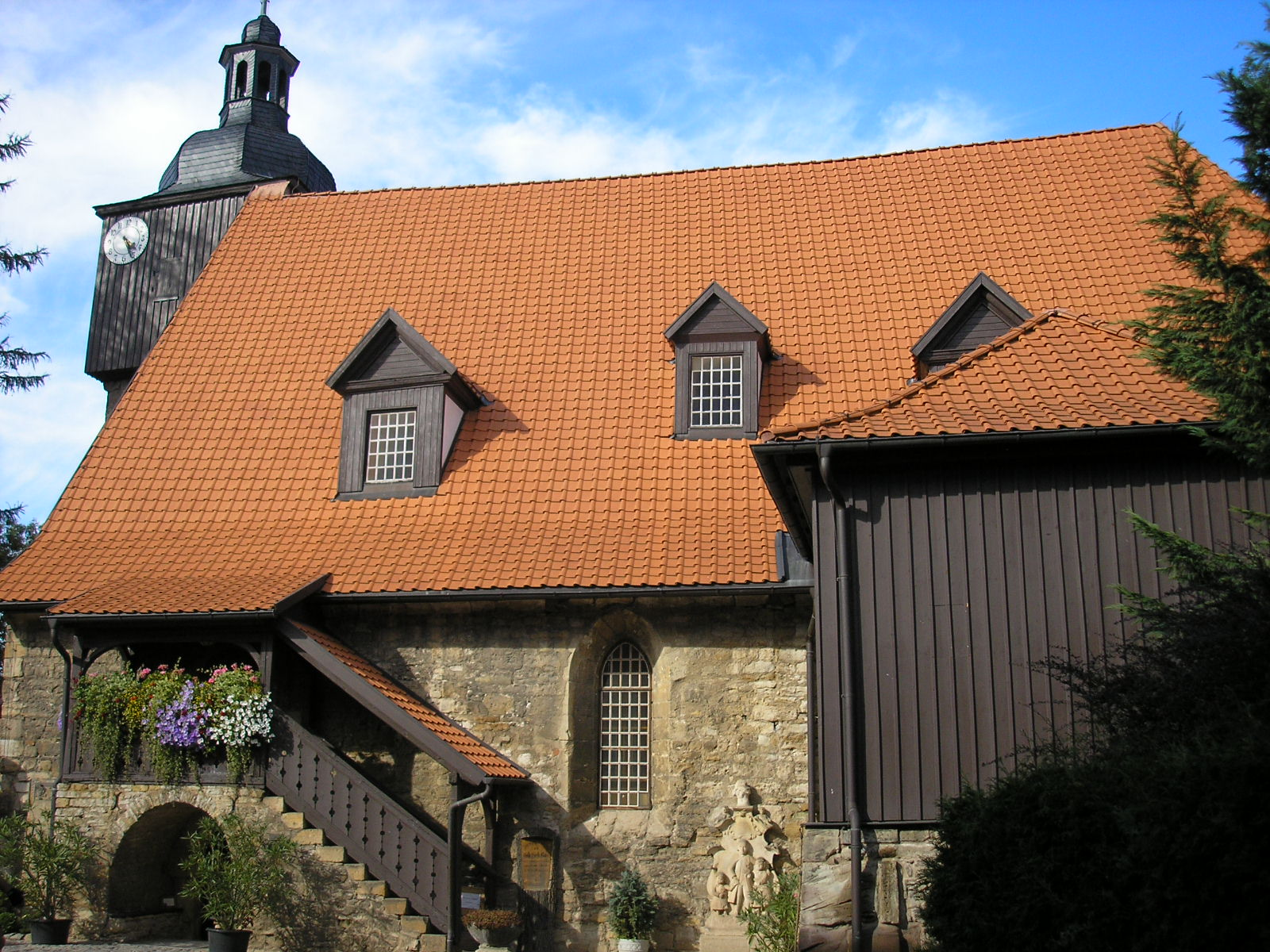
- The church in Dornheim, where the cantata may have been performed
- Bible text: Psalm 115:12-15
- Movements: 5
- Vocal: SATB choir; soprano, tenor and bass
- Instrumental: strings and continuo

Der Herr denket an uns (The Lord is mindful of us), BWV 196, (Note: "BWV" is Bach-Werke-Verzeichnis, a thematic catalogue of Bach's works.) is a cantata by Johann Sebastian Bach. The early church cantata, possibly for a wedding, is difficult to date, but is generally considered to be an early work on stylistic grounds. The text is a passage from Psalm 115, assuring of God's blessing, especially for children. Scholars have suggested the work may have been written for the wedding of Johann Lorenz Stauber, the minister in Dornheim who had married Bach and his first wife there in 1707, and Regina Wedemann, an aunt of Bach's wife, on 5 June 1708.

Bach structured the work in five movements – an instrumental Sinfonia, a chorus, an aria, a duet and a final chorus. He scored it for three vocal soloists, a four-part choir and a Baroque instrumental ensemble of strings and continuo.

== History and words ==
The precise date of composition for this cantata is unknown, but it is generally considered to be an early work. The English Bach scholar Richard Jones notes that "although it survives only in a later manuscript copy", its stylistic features are evidence of an earlier date: its text comprises "selected psalm verses only, without any free madrigalian verse", it has no recitative, and the compositional approach "still breathes the air of the seventeenth century".

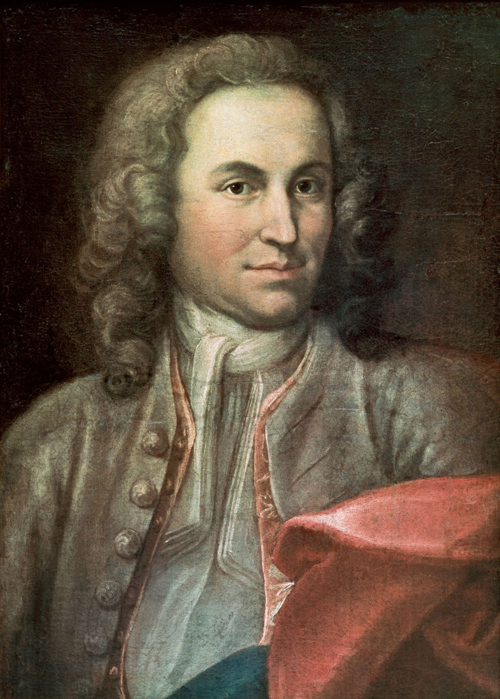
Portrait of the young Bach (disputed)

Many of Bach's later church cantatas were composed for the requirements of the liturgical calendar, but the early ones, including Der Herr denket an uns, were written for special occasions. The text is taken from Psalms 115:12-15, speaking of a thoughtful and blessing God. The passage includes in verse 14: "The Lord shall increase you more and more, you and your children". Many commentators, from his biographer Philipp Spitta onwards, have concluded that the cantata was written for a wedding. They have proposed weddings where it might have been performed, including Bach's own in October 1707, when he married his first wife Maria Barbara in Dornheim. The Bach scholar Alfred Dürr and others suggest that the cantata may have been written for the wedding of the minister Johann Lorenz Stauber, who had conducted the wedding ceremony for Bach, and Regina Wedemann, an aunt of Maria Barbara, in Dornheim on 5 June 1708. However, the wedding hypothesis is not proven, and the general text could fit other occasions.

The cantata was first published in 1864 in the Bach Gesellschaft first edition of the composer's complete works. It was published in the Neue Bach-Ausgabe in 1958, edited by Frederick Hudson.

== Scoring and structure ==
Bach structured the cantata in five movements, an instrumental sinfonia and two choral movements framing two arias, one for soprano (S), the other a duet for tenor (T) and bass (B). As in Bach's other early cantatas, there are no recitatives. Besides the three solo voices, Bach scored the work for a four-part choir and a Baroque instrumental ensemble of two violins (Vl), viola (Va), cello (Vc), bass (violone) and continuo, as a copy of the score from around 1731 by Johann Ludwig Dietel, a student of Bach, shows. The duration has been given as 10 minutes and the main key as C major.

In the following table of the movements, the scoring follows the Neue Bach-Ausgabe. The table uses the symbol for common time (4/4). The continuo including violone and organ, playing throughout, is not shown.

Movements of Der Herr denket an uns, BWV 196
No.	Title	Text	Type	Vocal	Strings	Key	Time
1			Sinfonia		2Vl Va Vc	C major	common time
2	Der Herr denket an uns und segnet uns	Ps. 115/12	Chorus	SATB	2Vl Va Vc	C major	common time
3	Er segnet, die den Herrn fürchten	Ps. 115/13	Aria	S	2Vl	A minor	common time
4	Der Herr segne euch	Ps. 115/14	Duet aria	T B	2Vl Va	C major	3/2
5	Ihr seid die Gesegneten des Herrn	Ps. 115/15	Chorus	SATB	2Vl Va	F major - C major	common time

== Music ==
Each vocal movement of the cantata is assigned to one verse of the psalm. The work has been described as a brief, sunny and festive work.

=== 1 ===
The opening sinfonia is march-like in style, reminiscent of processional music. It includes the dotted rhythms characteristic of the French overture in the opening section, and a contrasting minor-mode middle section in triplets. Two elements, the triplets and rising lines in imitation, return in later movements. The musicologist Julian Mincham concludes that "Bach, even at this early stage, was thinking across the movements and beginning to conceive such compositions as unified entities rather than suite-like potpourris".

=== 2 ===
The first chorus, "Der Herr denket an uns und segnet uns" (The Lord is mindful of us and blesses us), contains contrapuntal writing which also appears in other early cantatas. The movement opens like an organ prelude, preparing for a permutation fugue, a type of fugue found in Aus der Tiefen rufe ich, Herr, zu dir, BWV 131, for example. The vocal lines are rising in imitation, as in the sinfonia.

=== 3 ===
The soprano aria, "Er segnet, die den Herrn fürchten, beide, Kleine und Große" (He blesses those who fear the Lord, both small and great.), opens with a short ritornello theme and is in ternary form. The vocal line is scalar, contrasting with the obbligato violins, which play at times triplets, as in the sinfonia.

=== 4 ===
The duet aria, "Der Herr segne euch je mehr und mehr, euch und eure Kinder" (May the Lord bless you more and more, you and your children), is based on a single line of text. The violins play an imitative motif that does not align with the vocal phrases. the movement has been described as calm and "gently-swaying". Mincham notes a subtle growth "in the imitative opening motives of the violins taken, incidentally, from the sinfonia and dominating this movement throughout".

=== 5 ===
The closing chorus, "Ihr seid die Gesegneten des Herrn, der Himmel und Erde gemacht hat. Amen." (You are the blessed of the Lord, who made heaven and earth. Amen.), is "awash with rippling scale and arpeggio figures". It concludes with echoing of Amen.

== Recordings ==
- Bach-Collegium Stuttgart and Gächinger Kantorei, dir. Helmuth Rilling. Bach Edition: Cantatas 1. Hänssler Classic, 1975.
- Concentus Musicus Wien and Tölzer Knabenchor, dir. Nikolaus Harnoncourt. J. S. Bach: Das Kantatenwerk. Teldec, 1989.
- Amsterdam Baroque Orchestra & Choir, dir. Ton Koopman. J.S. Bach: Complete Cantatas Vol. 1. Erato, 1994.
- Bach Collegium Japan, dir. Masaaki Suzuki. J.S. Bach: Cantatas Vol. 1. BIS Records, 1995.
- Netherlands Bach Collegium and Holland Boys Choir, dir. Pieter Jan Leusink. Bach Edition: Cantatas Vol. 4. Brilliant Classics, 1999.
