= Elgersburg =

- Municipality
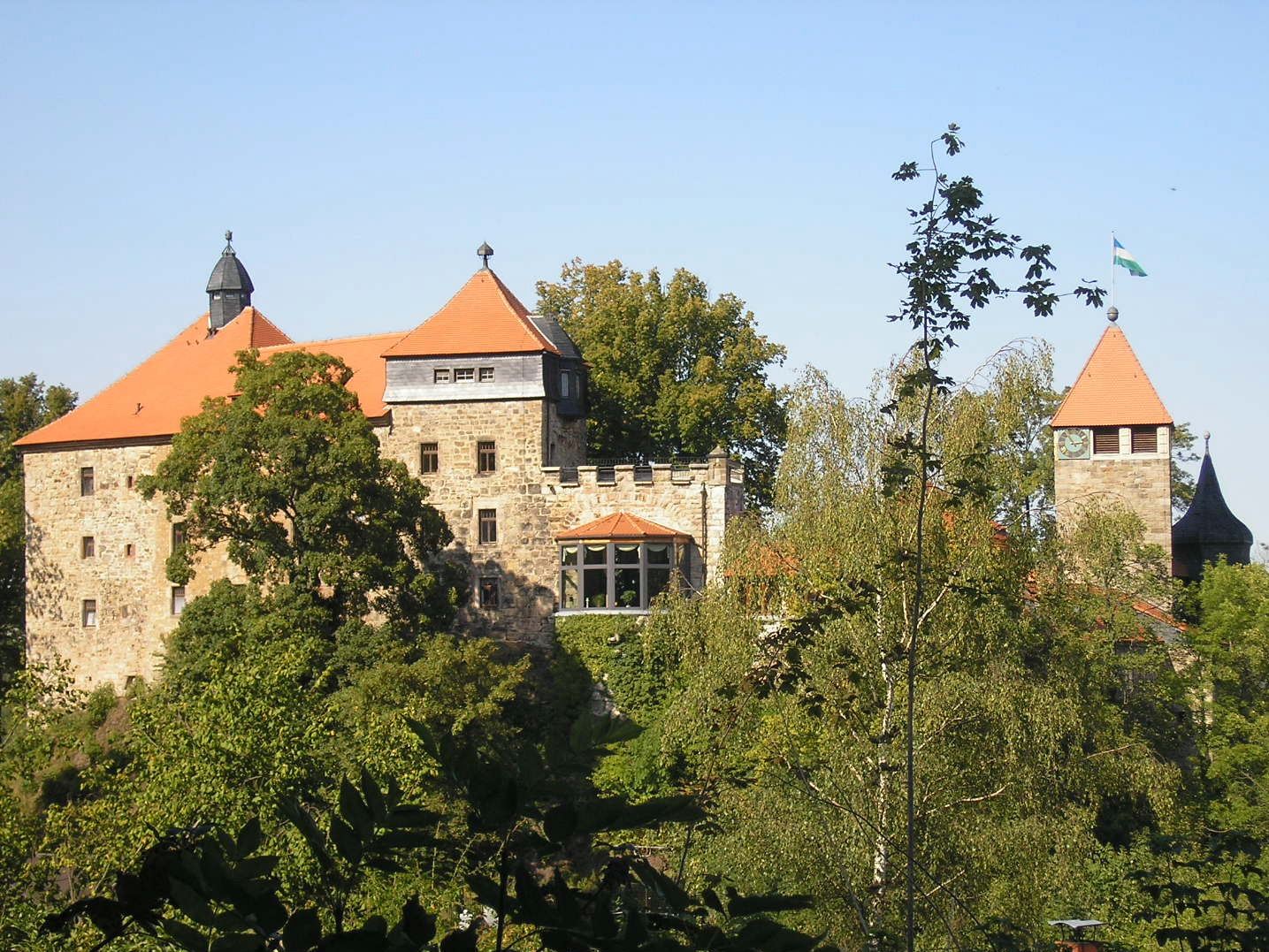
- Elgersburg Castle

- Coat of arms

- Location of Elgersburg within Ilm-Kreis district
- Interactive map of Elgersburg
- Location within Germany Location within Thuringia
- Coordinates: 50°42′16″N 10°51′13″E
- Country: Germany
- State: Thuringia
- District: Ilm-Kreis
- Municipal assoc.: Geratal/Plaue

Government
  - Mayor (2022–28): Mario Augner

Area
  - Total: 9.49 km^{2} (3.66 sq mi)
- Elevation: 490 m (1,610 ft)

Population (2025-12-31)
  - Total: 1,206
  - Density: 127/km^{2} (329/sq mi)
- Time zone: UTC+01:00 (CET)
  - Summer (DST): UTC+02:00 (CEST)
- Postal codes: 98716
- Dialling codes: 03677
- Vehicle registration: IK
- Website: www.elgersburg.com

Elgersburg (German pronunciation: [ˈɛlɡɐsbʊʁk]) is a municipality situated in the district of Ilm-Kreis, Thuringia, Germany.

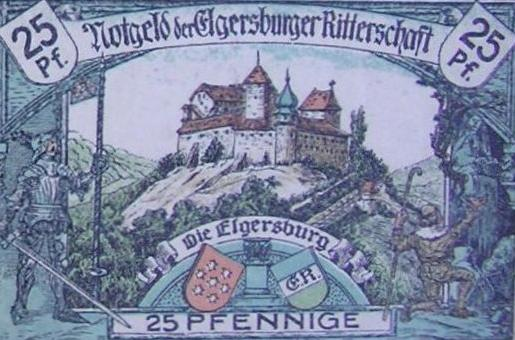
The Elgersburg Castle
