= Wildenspring =

- Ortsteil of Großbreitenbach
- Coat of arms
- Interactive map of Wildenspring
- Location within Germany Location within Thuringia
- Coordinates: 50°36′6″N 11°3′3″E
- Country: Germany
- State: Thuringia
- District: Ilm-Kreis
- Town: Großbreitenbach

Area
  - Total: 4.43 km^{2} (1.71 sq mi)
- Elevation: 630 m (2,070 ft)

Population (2017-12-31)
  - Total: 170
  - Density: 38/km^{2} (99/sq mi)
- Time zone: UTC+01:00 (CET)
  - Summer (DST): UTC+02:00 (CEST)
- Postal codes: 98701
- Dialling codes: 036781
- Vehicle registration: IK

Wildenspring (German pronunciation: [ˈvɪldn̩ˌʃpʁɪŋ]) is a village and a former municipality in the district Ilm-Kreis, in Thuringia, Germany. Since 1 January 2019, it is part of the town Großbreitenbach.
