= Geratal/Plaue =

- Verwaltungsgemeinschaft
- Map of Ilm-Kreis highlighting Geratal/Plaue
- Interactive map of Geratal/Plaue
- Location within Germany Location within Thuringia
- Coordinates: 50°44′N 10°51′E
- Country: Germany
- State: Thuringia
- District: Ilm-Kreis
- Seat: Geraberg
- Subdivisions: 3 municipalities

Area
  - Total: 45.41 km^{2} (17.53 sq mi)

Population (2025-12-31)
  - Total: 4,314
  - Density: 95.00/km^{2} (246.1/sq mi)
- Time zone: UTC+01:00 (CET)
  - Summer (DST): UTC+02:00 (CEST)
- Website: www.geratal.de

Geratal/Plaue (before 2019: Geratal) is a Verwaltungsgemeinschaft ("collective municipality") in the district Ilm-Kreis, in Thuringia, Germany. The seat of the Verwaltungsgemeinschaft is in Geraberg, itself not part of the Verwaltungsgemeinschaft.

The Verwaltungsgemeinschaft Geratal/Plaue consists of the following municipalities:

1. Elgersburg
2. Martinroda
3. Plaue
