= Neustadt am Rennsteig =

Village and a former municipality in the district Ilm-Kreis, in Thuringia, Germany

- Ortsteil of Großbreitenbach
- Coat of arms
- Interactive map of Neustadt am Rennsteig
- Location within Germany Location within Thuringia
- Coordinates: 50°34′57″N 10°56′1″E
- Country: Germany
- State: Thuringia
- District: Ilm-Kreis
- Town: Großbreitenbach

Area
  - Total: 17.03 km^{2} (6.58 sq mi)
- Elevation: 785 m (2,575 ft)

Population (2017-12-31)
  - Total: 918
  - Density: 53.9/km^{2} (140/sq mi)
- Time zone: UTC+01:00 (CET)
  - Summer (DST): UTC+02:00 (CEST)
- Postal codes: 98701
- Dialling codes: 036781
- Vehicle registration: IK
- Website: www.neustadtamrennsteig.de

Neustadt am Rennsteig (pronounced [ˈnɔʏʃtat ʔam ˈʁɛnʃtaɪk], lit. 'Neustadt on the Rennsteig') is a village and a former municipality in the district Ilm-Kreis, in Thuringia, Germany. Since 1 January 2019, it is part of the town Großbreitenbach. Its history can be traced back to the 15th century. Due to its location at 805 metres above sea level, there is scarcely another Thuringian locality located this high.
