= Elleben =

- Municipality
- Location of Elleben within Ilm-Kreis district
- Interactive map of Elleben
- Location within Germany Location within Thuringia
- Coordinates: 50°51′43″N 11°5′32″E
- Country: Germany
- State: Thuringia
- District: Ilm-Kreis
- Municipal assoc.: Riechheimer Berg
- Subdivisions: 3

Government
  - Mayor (2020–26): Corinne Krah

Area
  - Total: 17.01 km^{2} (6.57 sq mi)
- Elevation: 320 m (1,050 ft)

Population (2025-12-31)
  - Total: 884
  - Density: 52.0/km^{2} (135/sq mi)
- Time zone: UTC+01:00 (CET)
  - Summer (DST): UTC+02:00 (CEST)
- Postal codes: 99334
- Dialling codes: 036200
- Vehicle registration: IK
- Website: www.vg-riechheimer-berg.de

Elleben is a municipality in the district Ilm-Kreis, in Thuringia, Germany. Elleben has two named communities, Riechheim and Gügleben.

== History ==
Under the German Empire (1871–1918), Elleben was part of the Principality of Schwarzburg-Sondershausen, while Riechheim and Gügleben were part of the Duchy of Saxe-Meiningen.
