= Ichtershausen =

Village in Thuringia, Germany

- Ortsteil of Amt Wachsenburg
- Coat of arms
- Interactive map of Ichtershausen
- Location within Germany Location within Thuringia
- Coordinates: 50°52′39″N 10°58′20″E
- Country: Germany
- State: Thuringia
- District: Ilm-Kreis
- Municipality: Amt Wachsenburg

Area
  - Total: 20.35 km^{2} (7.86 sq mi)
- Elevation: 249 m (817 ft)

Population (31 December 2011)
  - Total: 3,880
  - Density: 191/km^{2} (494/sq mi)
- Time zone: UTC+01:00 (CET)
  - Summer (DST): UTC+02:00 (CEST)
- Postal codes: 99334
- Dialling codes: 03628
- Vehicle registration: IK, ARN
- Website: www.ichtershausen.de

Ichtershausen (German pronunciation: [ɪçtɐsˈhaʊzn̩]) is a village and a former municipality in the district Ilm-Kreis, in Thuringia, Germany. Since 31 December 2012, it is part of the municipality Amt Wachsenburg.

== Demographics ==
Historical population
Year	Pop.	±%
1996	3,993	—
2001	3,968	−0.6%
2006	3,924	−1.1%
2011	3,880	−1.1%
Source: "Thüringer Landesamt für Statistik" (in German).
