= Osthausen-Wülfershausen =

- Municipality
- Location of Osthausen-Wülfershausen within Ilm-Kreis district
- Interactive map of Osthausen-Wülfershausen
- Location within Germany Location within Thuringia
- Coordinates: 50°51′10″N 11°6′7″E
- Country: Germany
- State: Thuringia
- District: Ilm-Kreis
- Municipal assoc.: Riechheimer Berg

Government
  - Mayor (2020–26): Klaus Kolodziej (CDU)

Area
  - Total: 14.75 km^{2} (5.70 sq mi)
- Elevation: 345 m (1,132 ft)

Population (2025-12-31)
  - Total: 514
  - Density: 34.8/km^{2} (90.3/sq mi)
- Time zone: UTC+01:00 (CET)
  - Summer (DST): UTC+02:00 (CEST)
- Postal codes: 99310
- Dialling codes: 036200
- Vehicle registration: IK
- Website: www.vg-riechheimer-berg.de

Osthausen-Wülfershausen (German pronunciation: [ɔstˈhaʊzn̩ ˌvʏlfɐsˈhaʊzn̩]) is a municipality in the district Ilm-Kreis, in Thuringia, Germany.
