= Bösleben-Wüllersleben =

- Municipality
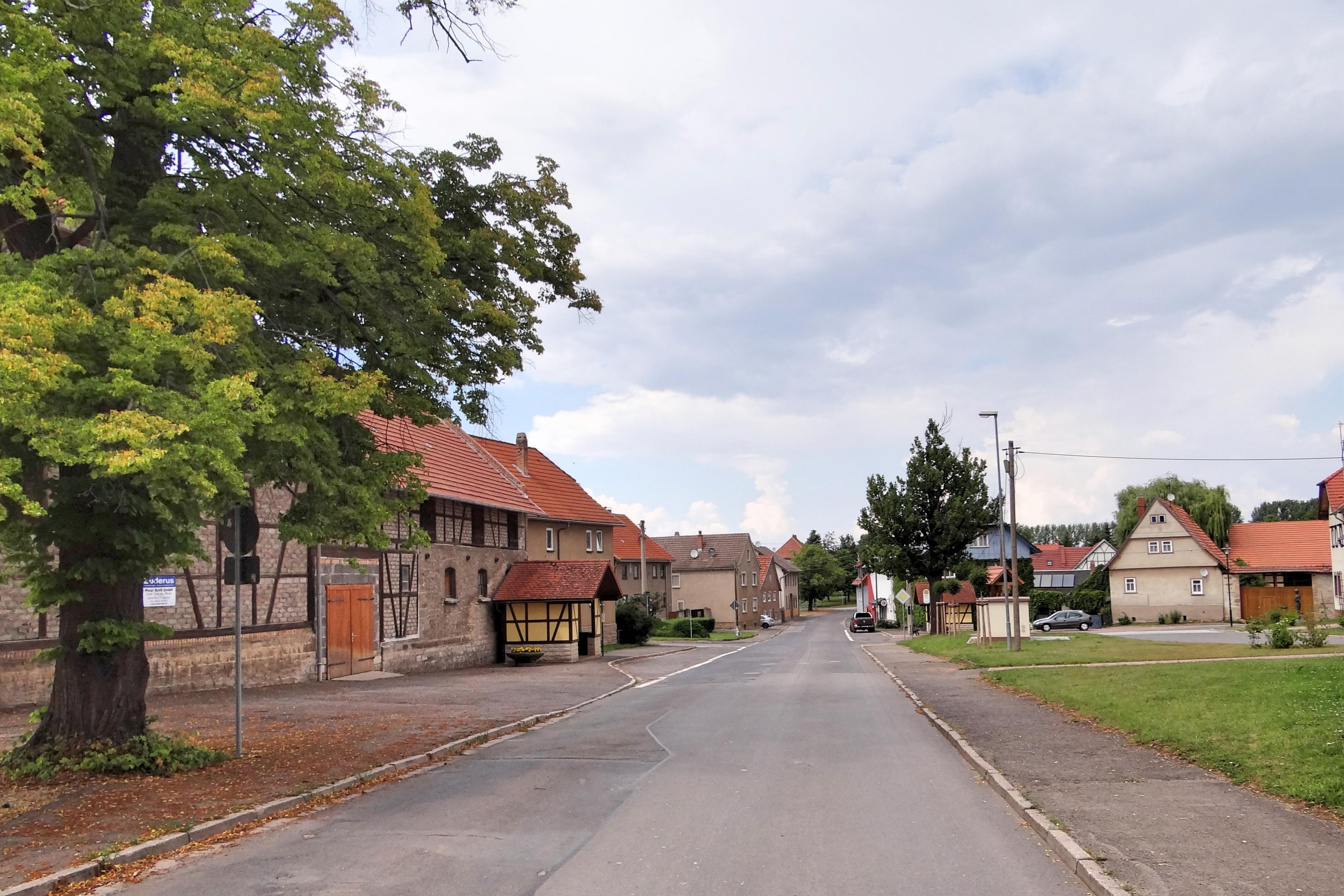

- Location of Bösleben-Wüllersleben within Ilm-Kreis district
- Interactive map of Bösleben-Wüllersleben
- Location within Germany Location within Thuringia
- Coordinates: 50°49′36″N 11°3′32″E
- Country: Germany
- State: Thuringia
- District: Ilm-Kreis
- Municipal assoc.: Riechheimer Berg
- Subdivisions: 2

Government
  - Mayor (2022–28): Andreas Nitsch

Area
  - Total: 16.13 km^{2} (6.23 sq mi)
- Elevation: 355 m (1,165 ft)

Population (2025-12-31)
  - Total: 629
  - Density: 39.0/km^{2} (101/sq mi)
- Time zone: UTC+01:00 (CET)
  - Summer (DST): UTC+02:00 (CEST)
- Postal codes: 99310
- Dialling codes: 036200
- Vehicle registration: IK
- Website: Bösleben-Wüllersleben

Bösleben-Wüllersleben (German pronunciation: [ˈbøːsleːbn̩ ˈvʏlɐsleːbn̩]) is a municipality in the district Ilm-Kreis, in Thuringia, Germany.
