= Großbreitenbach =

- Town
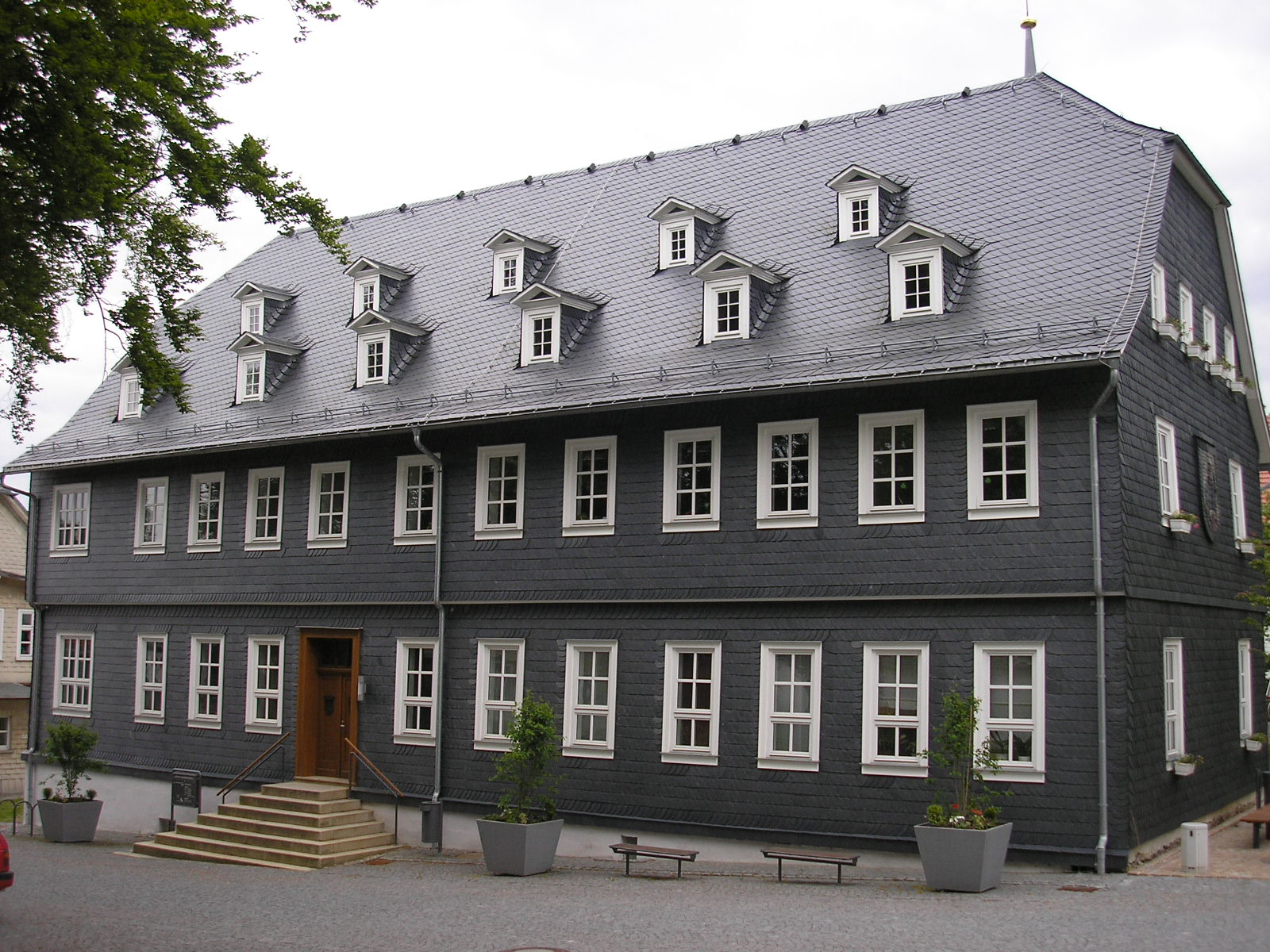
- Town hall

- Coat of arms

- Location of Großbreitenbach within Ilm-Kreis district
- Interactive map of Großbreitenbach
- Location within Germany Location within Thuringia
- Coordinates: 50°34′58″N 11°0′38″E
- Country: Germany
- State: Thuringia
- District: Ilm-Kreis

Government
  - Mayor (2019–25): Peter Grimm

Area
  - Total: 80.76 km^{2} (31.18 sq mi)
- Elevation: 630 m (2,070 ft)

Population (2025-12-31)
  - Total: 5,884
  - Density: 72.86/km^{2} (188.7/sq mi)
- Time zone: UTC+01:00 (CET)
  - Summer (DST): UTC+02:00 (CEST)
- Postal codes: 98701
- Dialling codes: 036781
- Vehicle registration: IK
- Website: www.lg-grossbreitenbach.de

Großbreitenbach (German pronunciation: [ɡʁoːsˈbʁaɪtn̩bax]) is a town in the Ilm-Kreis district, in Thuringia, Germany. It is situated 13 km southeast of Ilmenau. It has about 8000 inhabitants. Major industries are glass manufacturing and tourism. The former municipalities Altenfeld, Böhlen, Friedersdorf, Gillersdorf, Herschdorf, Neustadt am Rennsteig and Wildenspring were merged into Großbreitenbach in January 2019.

Großbreitenbach has a big public swimming pool, which has the biggest bathing area in the Ilm-Kreis district.
