= Dornheim =

- Municipality
- Coat of arms

- Location of Dornheim within Ilm-Kreis district
- Interactive map of Dornheim
- Location within Germany Location within Thuringia
- Coordinates: 50°50′6″N 10°59′39″E
- Country: Germany
- State: Thuringia
- District: Ilm-Kreis
- Municipal assoc.: Riechheimer Berg

Government
  - Mayor (2022–28): Burkhard Walther

Area
  - Total: 7.99 km^{2} (3.08 sq mi)
- Elevation: 290 m (950 ft)

Population (2025-12-31)
  - Total: 568
  - Density: 71.1/km^{2} (184/sq mi)
- Time zone: UTC+01:00 (CET)
  - Summer (DST): UTC+02:00 (CEST)
- Postal codes: 99310
- Dialling codes: 03628
- Vehicle registration: IK
- Website: Dornheim

Dornheim (German pronunciation: [ˈdɔʁnhaɪm]) is a municipality in the district Ilm-Kreis, in Thuringia, Germany.

The main attraction is the village church where the composer Johann Sebastian Bach was married in 1707.
