= Wachsenburg Castle =

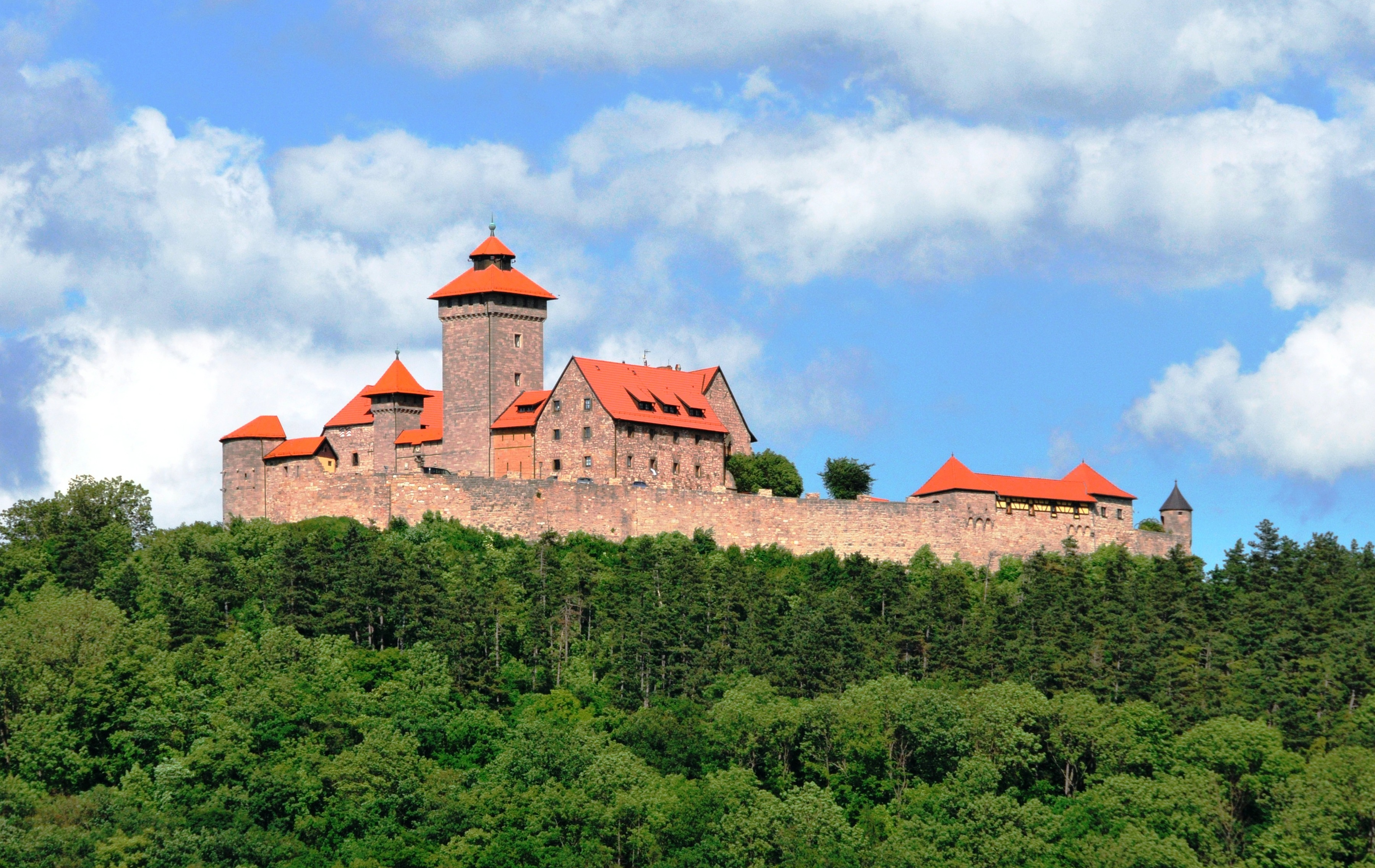

- Location within Thuringia Wachsenburg Castle (Germany)

General information
- Architectural style: castle
- Location: Amt Wachsenburg, Germany
- Coordinates: 50°51′30″N 10°52′35″E
- Construction started: 930

Wachsenburg Castle (German: Veste Wachsenburg) is a castle in Amt Wachsenburg in the Ilm-Kreis, Thuringia, Germany. It is one of the Drei Gleichen, three hilltop castles east of Gotha. It was originally built in the 10th century. The castle was extensively reconstructed in the 17th and 19th century. The well-preserved castle (most recently restored in the 1990s) now houses a museum, a hotel and a restaurant.

It was built by Hersfeld Monastery. The castle is approximately 93 metres (305 ft) deep. During its history, Wachsenburg Castle has had its fair share of troubles. In 1441 CE a notorious robber baron took control of the castle and made it his base for his raids on the merchants of Erfurt.
