= Herschdorf =

- Ortsteil of Großbreitenbach
- Coat of arms
- Interactive map of Herschdorf
- Location within Germany Location within Thuringia
- Coordinates: 50°37′44″N 11°2′57″E
- Country: Germany
- State: Thuringia
- District: Ilm-Kreis
- Town: Großbreitenbach
- Subdivisions: 3

Area
  - Total: 9.55 km^{2} (3.69 sq mi)
- Elevation: 625 m (2,051 ft)

Population (2017-12-31)
  - Total: 809
  - Density: 84.7/km^{2} (219/sq mi)
- Time zone: UTC+01:00 (CET)
  - Summer (DST): UTC+02:00 (CEST)
- Postal codes: 98701
- Dialling codes: 036738
- Vehicle registration: IK

Herschdorf (German pronunciation: [ˈhɛʁʃˌdɔʁf]) is a village and a former municipality in the district Ilm-Kreis, in Thuringia, Germany. Since 1 January 2019, it is part of the town Großbreitenbach.
