= Amt Wachsenburg =

- Municipality
- Coat of arms

- Location of Amt Wachsenburg within Ilm-Kreis district
- Interactive map of Amt Wachsenburg
- Location within Germany Location within Thuringia
- Coordinates: 50°52′N 10°55′E
- Country: Germany
- State: Thuringia
- District: Ilm-Kreis
- Subdivisions: 13

Government
  - Mayor (2022–28): Sebastian Schiffer

Area
  - Total: 77.63 km^{2} (29.97 sq mi)
- Elevation: 260 m (850 ft)

Population (2025-12-31)
  - Total: 8,041
  - Density: 103.6/km^{2} (268.3/sq mi)
- Time zone: UTC+01:00 (CET)
  - Summer (DST): UTC+02:00 (CEST)
- Vehicle registration: IK

Amt Wachsenburg (German pronunciation: [amt ˈvaksn̩bʊʁk]) is a municipality in the district Ilm-Kreis, in Thuringia, Germany. The municipality is named after the Wachsenburg Castle which is located in its center. It was formed on 31 December 2012 from the former municipalities Wachsenburggemeinde and Ichtershausen. The former municipality Kirchheim was merged into Amt Wachsenburg in January 2019, and Rockhausen in December 2019. It consists of the villages Bechstedt-Wagd, Bittstädt, Eischleben, Haarhausen, Holzhausen, Ichtershausen, Kirchheim, Rehestädt, Rockhausen, Röhrensee, Sülzenbrücken, Thörey and Werningsleben.
