= Elxleben =

- Municipality
- Coat of arms

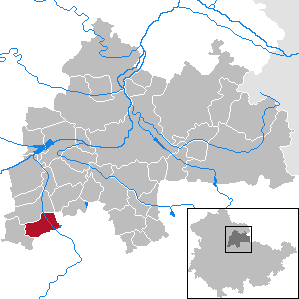
- Location of Elxleben within Sömmerda district
- Interactive map of Elxleben
- Location within Germany Location within Thuringia
- Coordinates: 51°2′44″N 10°56′50″E
- Country: Germany
- State: Thuringia
- District: Sömmerda

Government
  - Mayor (2024–30): Heiko Koch

Area
  - Total: 12.21 km^{2} (4.71 sq mi)
- Elevation: 164 m (538 ft)

Population (2025-12-31)
  - Total: 2,229
  - Density: 182.6/km^{2} (472.8/sq mi)
- Time zone: UTC+01:00 (CET)
  - Summer (DST): UTC+02:00 (CEST)
- Postal codes: 99189
- Dialling codes: 036201
- Vehicle registration: SÖM
- Website: www.elxleben.de

Elxleben (German pronunciation: [ˈɛlksˌleːbn̩]) is a municipality in the Sömmerda district of Thuringia, Germany.
