= Ilm-Kreis =

Coordinates: 50°45′N 11°00′E

- District
- Flag Coat of arms
- Country: Germany
- State: Thuringia
- Capital: Arnstadt

Government
  - District admin.: Petra Enders (Ind.)

Area
  - Total: 805.11 km^{2} (310.85 sq mi)

Population (31 December 2025)
  - Total: 106,657
  - Density: 132.48/km^{2} (343.11/sq mi)
- Time zone: UTC+01:00 (CET)
  - Summer (DST): UTC+02:00 (CEST)
- Vehicle registration: IK, ARN, IL
- Website: ilm-kreis.de

Ilm-Kreis is a district in Thuringia, Germany. It is bounded by (from the north and clockwise) the city of Erfurt, the districts of Weimarer Land, Saalfeld-Rudolstadt and Hildburghausen, the city of Suhl, and the districts of Schmalkalden-Meiningen and Gotha. It is named after the river Ilm, flowing through the district.

== History ==
In medieval times the territory was ruled by the counts of Henneberg and the princes of Schwarzburg, two local dynasties. While Ilmenau was ruled by Henneberg, Arnstadt belonged to Schwarzburg. When the Henneberg family became extinct in 1583, Ilmenau was acquired by Saxony. In the meantime the principality of Schwarzburg began to disintegrate and was split up into several tiny states. One of those states (Schwarzburg-Arnstadt) was based in Arnstadt; it was founded in 1574 and existed until 1716, when it fell to Schwarzburg-Sondershausen. This mini state existed until 1920, when the state of Thuringia was founded.

The district was founded in 1920 (under the name Arnstadt); it was divided in 1952 into the districts of Arnstadt and Ilmenau, but reunited in 1994.

== Geography ==
In its southern portions the district includes parts of the southeastern Thuringian Forest, among them the highest elevation of that mountain chain, the Großer Beerberg (982 m). To the north the country is sloping away and becomes rather plain, mainly agricultural area.

== Coat of arms ==
The coat of arms displays:

- the heraldic lion from the principality of Schwarzburg
- the hen from the county of Henneberg
- the eagle from the city arms of Arnstadt

== Towns and municipalities ==
Clickable map of towns and municipalities in the district

Verwaltungsgemeinschaft-free towns
1. Arnstadt
2. Großbreitenbach
3. Ilmenau
4. Stadtilm
and municipalities
1. Amt Wachsenburg
2. Geratal

Verwaltungsgemeinschaften
1. Geratal/Plaue; [seat: Geraberg in Geratal]: 1. Elgersburg; 2. Martinroda; 3. Plaue^{2}	2. Riechheimer Berg; 1. Alkersleben; 2. Bösleben-Wüllersleben; 3. Dornheim; 4. Elleben; 5. Elxleben; 6. Osthausen-Wülfershausen^{1}; 7. Witzleben
^{1}seat of the Verwaltungsgemeinschaft;^{2}town

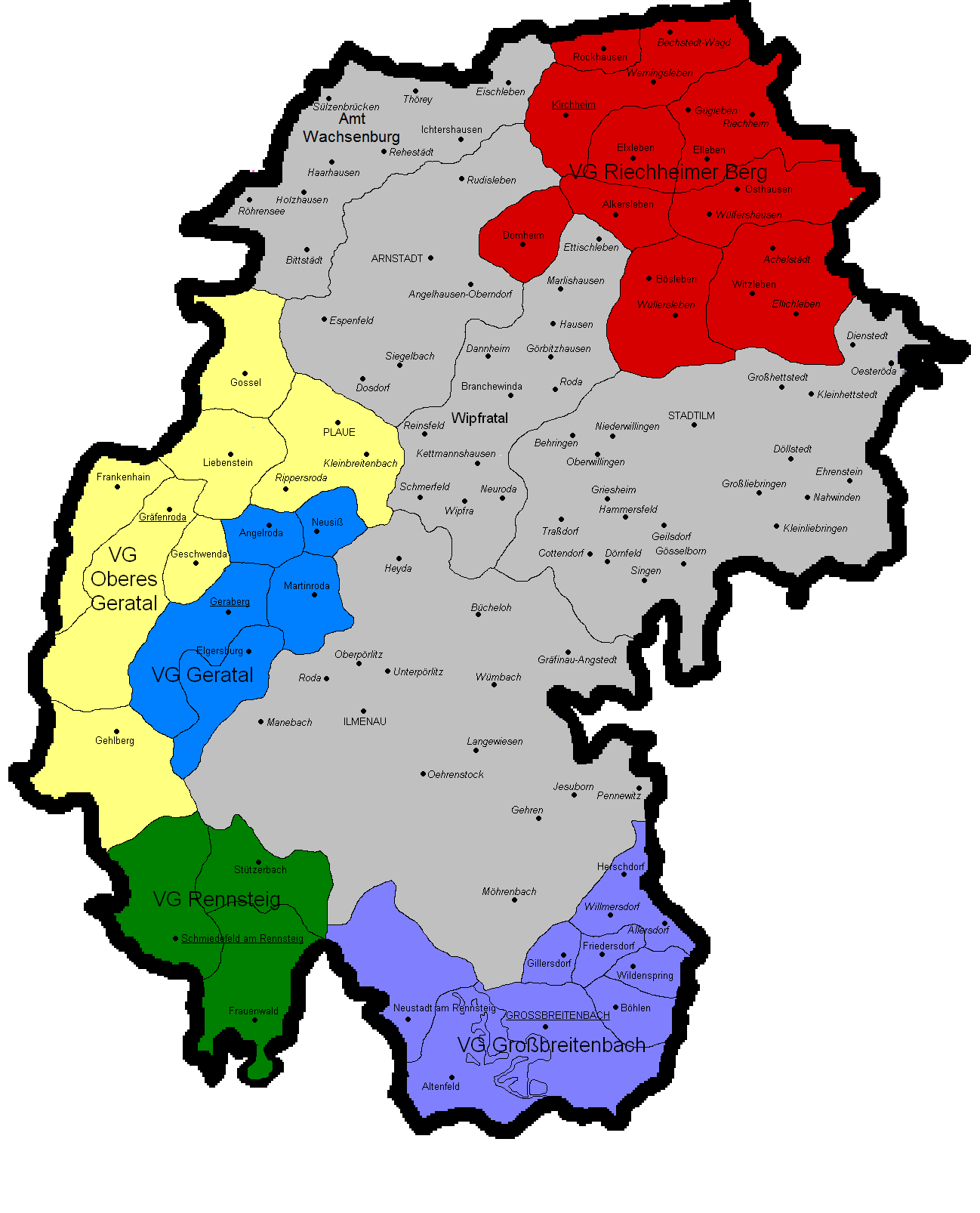
All villages, municipalities and towns in Ilm-Kreis
