= Little Thuringian Forest =

The Little Thuringian Forest (German: Kleiner Thüringer Wald) is a region of mountains and hills that lies southwest of Suhl and northwest of Schleusingen, and extends as far as an imaginary line from Schmeheim via Bischofrod and Gethles to Rappelsdorf. Its length is about 11 km (6.8 mi), its width varies between 1 km (0.62 mi) and 2 km (1.2 mi). Its name is not to be understood in an orographic or geographic sense, but is due to the marked similarity of its bedrock to that of the Thuringian Forest to the north of it.

== Geography ==
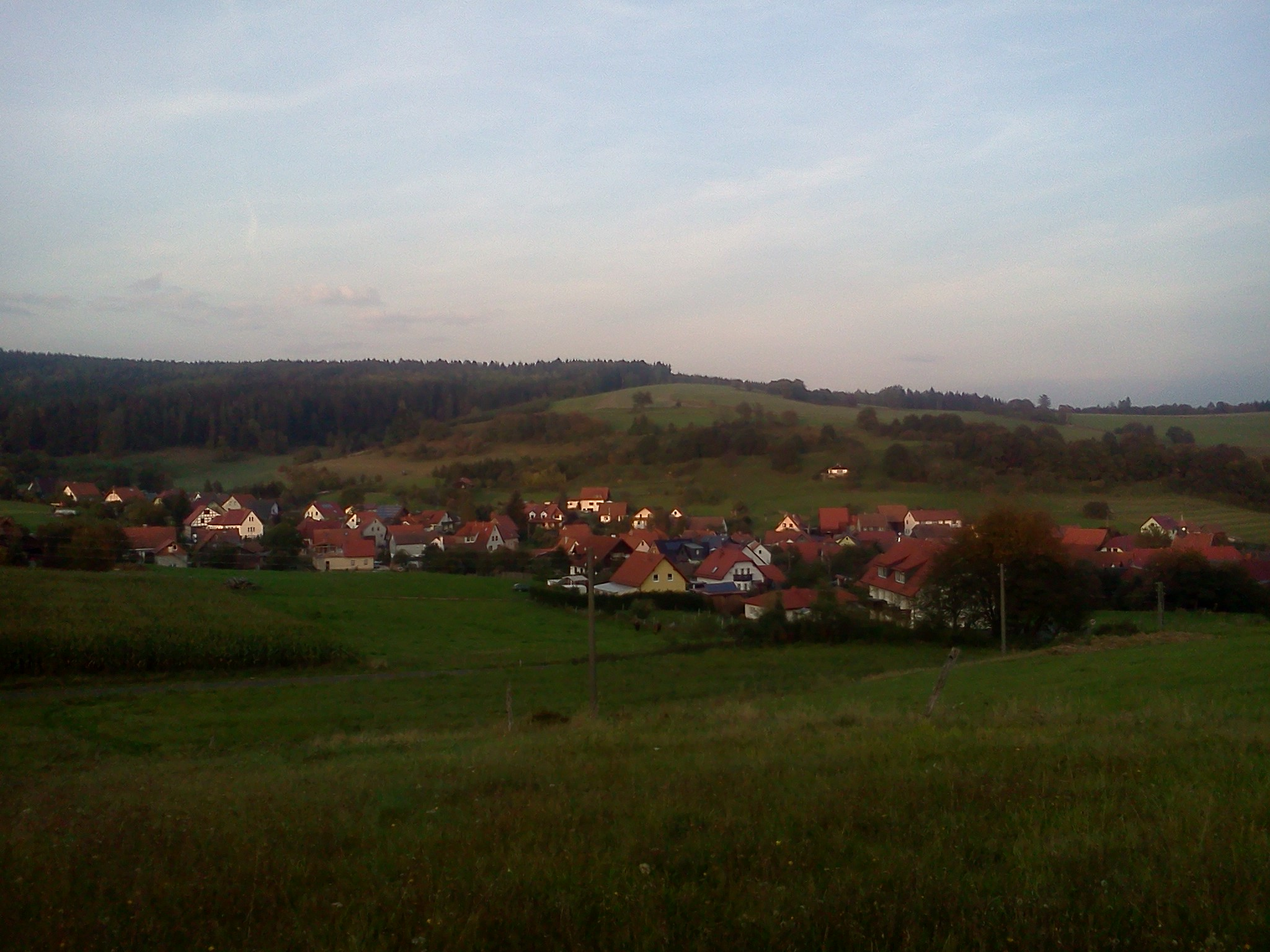
Gethles in the Little Thuringian Forest

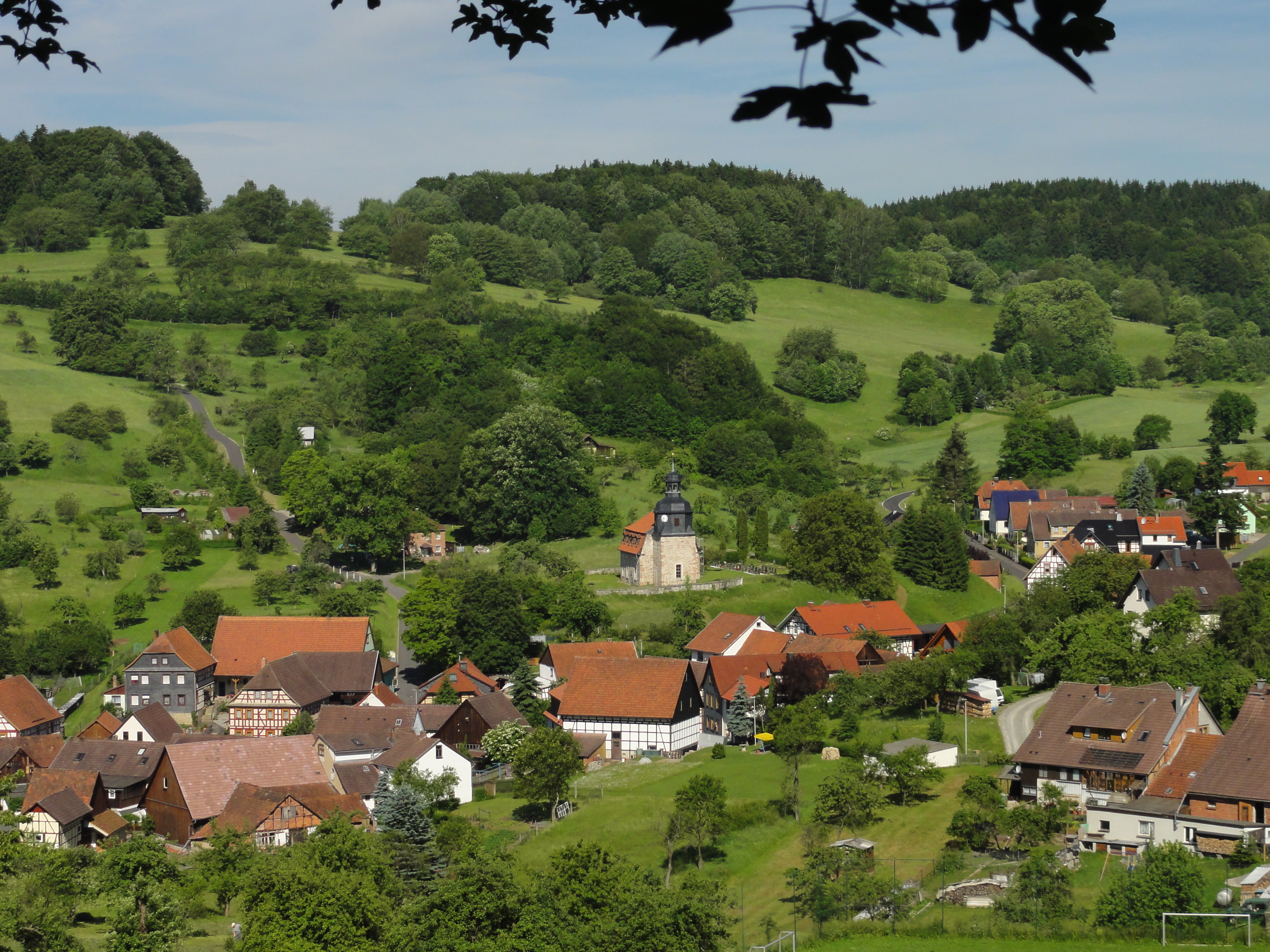
Eichenberg in the Little Thuringian Forest

The region extends northwest from Schleusingen, beginning near Rappelsdorf, via Gethles, Ahlstädt, Bischofrod, Keulrod, Eichenberg to north of the Sandberg near Grub, in the northwest of Hildburghausen district, parallel to the Thuringian Forest range. The Little Thuringian Forest is surrounded on all sides by forested mountains formed of Buntsandstein and Muschelkalk, some of which rise over 200 metres above it.

== Geology ==
Geologically, the Little Thuringian Forest is a horst that consists of a band-like island of paleozoic materials similar to those in the bedrock of the Thuringian Forest that surfaces in the southwestern foothills of the latter mountains. Like the latter, it is part of the Variscan mountains, but the stratigraphic throws are lower and have occurred on a smaller scale. It is tectonically isolated from the Thuringian Forest and the Thuringian Highlands, and is situated outside their border fault. Its highest summit is Schneeberg near Bischofrod at 692 m a.s.l., rising from a Buntsandstein layer. While geologically a separate mountain range, it does not appear as such to the casual observer, but as a hilly area with an average height of 460 m a.s.l. embedded between eroded deposits of the Triassic period. Towards the southwest it is limited by a marked border fault. Even the Muschelkalk hills beyond the latter are 30 m (98 ft) to 50 m (160 ft) higher. Several valleys of the foothills of the Thuringian Forest transect the area, showing evidence of a weak folding process. The Little Thuringian Forest is surrounded by Zechstein formations everywhere except along its border fault west of Gethles and Bischofrod. Its northern border is Gruber Berg with an outcrop of Zechstein rock.

== Economy ==
The area is characterised by farmed fields, since the condition of the soils allows for agricultural productivity, in contrast to the forested Buntsandstein heights. The settlements in the region are thus traditionally farmers' villages. In particular, the Zechstein subsoil around Gethles, Ahlstädt, and Eichenberg yields a good, albeit heavy farming soil. Also, the stratified dolomitic rocks (Plattendolomit) underlie a good farming soil, as does the finely grained lower Buntsandstein with interspersed clay layers. Less suited for cultivation are the upper Buntsandstein soils, and the areas with nutrient-poor porphyric and granitic subsoils are the least cultivable ones.

Iron ore, baryte, and fluorite were mined on Kuhberg hill near Gethles, on Steinberg near Ahlstädt, and between Bischofrod and Eichenberg. Mining, however, was not profitable in the long run due to difficult drainage. The conformation of large deposits of baryte of high quality in the late 1950s did not lead to a revival of mining activities.

== Tourism ==
There is no protected landscape in the Little Thuringian Forest. An application in the early 1990s was never implemented. Maps and publications implying the contrary do not refer to the geological rock complex described above, but the wooded ridges that rise to the north and northwest of it, including peaks such as the Donnersberg, Schleusinger Berg, Schneeberg, Kesselberg, Galgenberg, Eichenberg, Ehrenberg etc. that are part of the Buntsandstein formation. Hikers following these maps, for example, from Bischofrod or Eichenberg across Schneeberg to the northwest will actually leave the Little Thuringian Forest, as defined in the geological sense.

== Maps ==
- Geologische Spezialkarte. Königlich Preußischen Geologische Landesanstalt. Scale 1:25000. Sheets Schleusingen (1898), Themar (1892), Hildburghausen (1892)
- Maximilian Tornow (1907): Der Kleine Thüringer Wald. Scale 1:25000
- Geologische Übersichtskarte 1 : 200 000, Blatt CC 5526 Erfurt. Hannover: Bundesanstalt für Geowissenschaften und Rohstoffe. 1998. Shows the area as a band of Zechstein rocks.
