= Schneeberg (Thuringian Forest) =

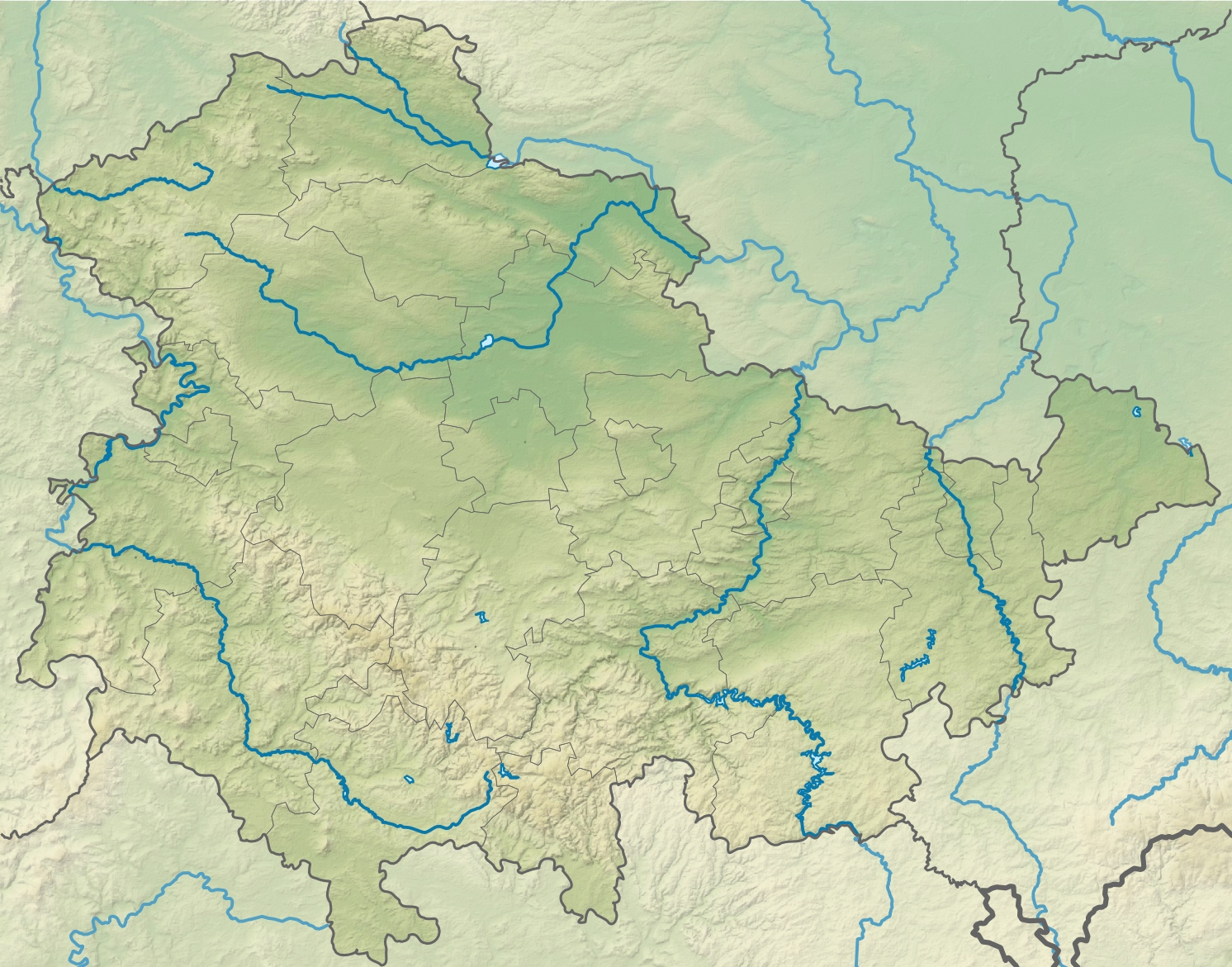
- Location within Thuringia

Highest point
- Elevation: 692.4 m above sea level (NN) (2,272 ft)
- Listing: Höchster Berg im Kl. Thür. Wald, südlichster Punkt der Stadt Suhl
- Coordinates: 50°33′41″N 10°39′31″E

Geography
- Location: Thuringia, Germany
- Parent range: Thuringian Forest

The Schneeberg is a mountain that stands 692.4 metres high and marks the southernmost boundary of the borough of Suhl in the German state of Thuringia.

The mountain is forested down to the valley in the south. Its southern mountainside belongs to the parish of Grub and Eichenberg, both small forest villages near Themar, Hildburghausen. Schneeberg is the highest point of the Little Thuringian Forest. A hiking trail runs over the wooded Schneeberg linking Dolmar to the Rennsteig trail.
