= List of cities in Thuringia by population =

The following list sorts all cities and communes in the German state of Thuringia with a population of more than 10,000. As of December 31, 2025, 35 cities fulfill this criterion and are listed here. This list refers only to the population of individual municipalities within their defined limits, which does not include other municipalities or suburban areas within urban agglomerations.

== List ==
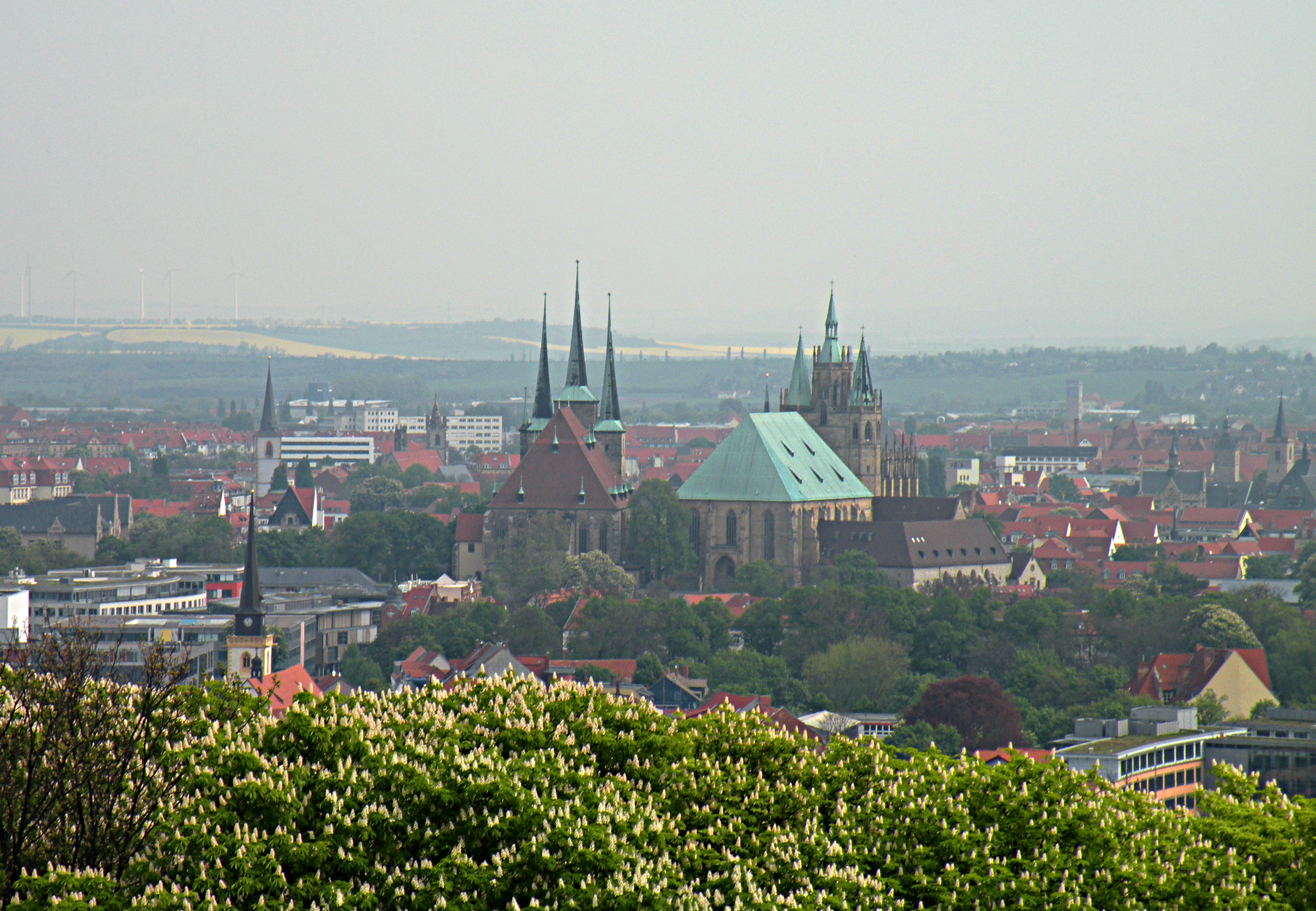
Erfurt

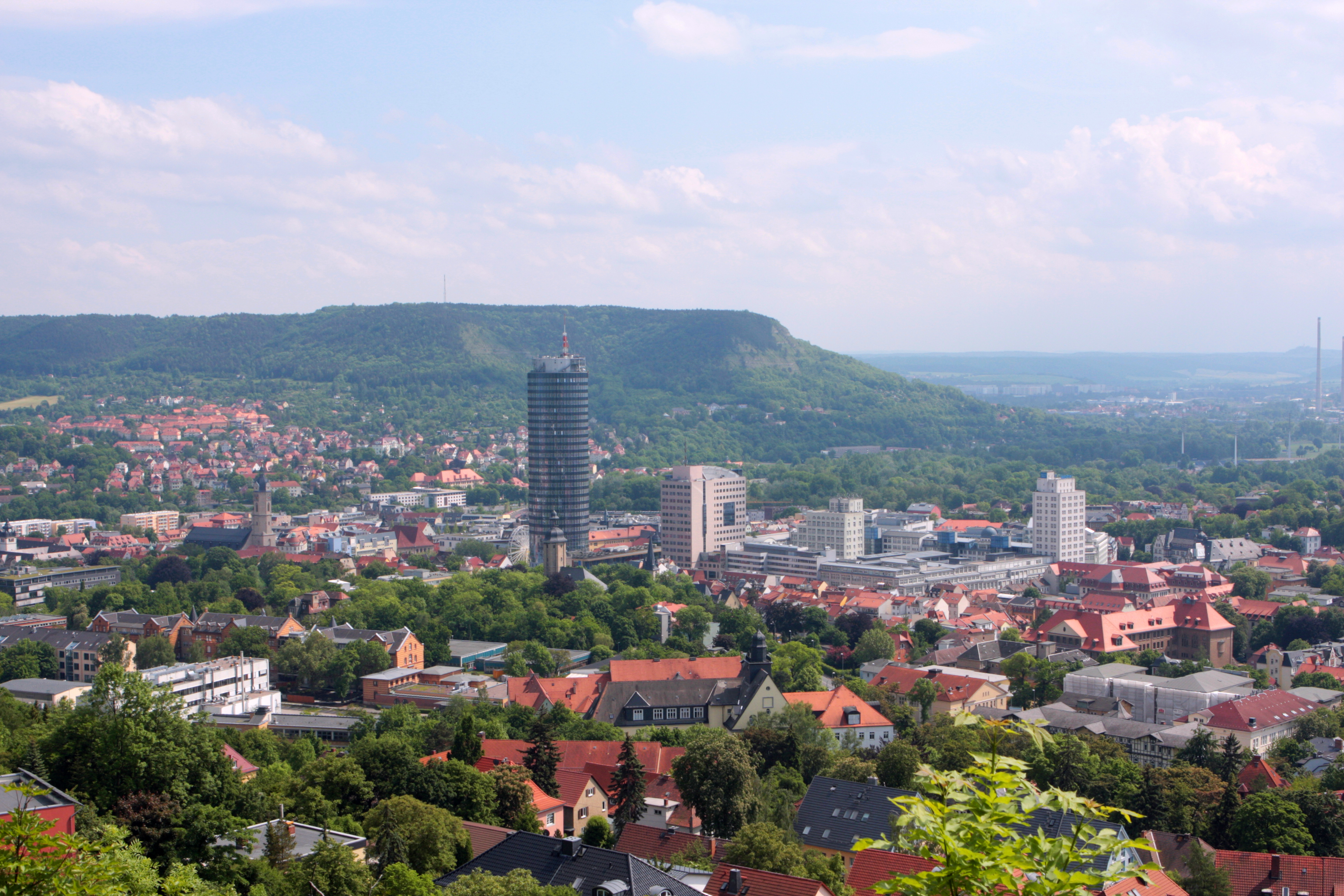
Jena

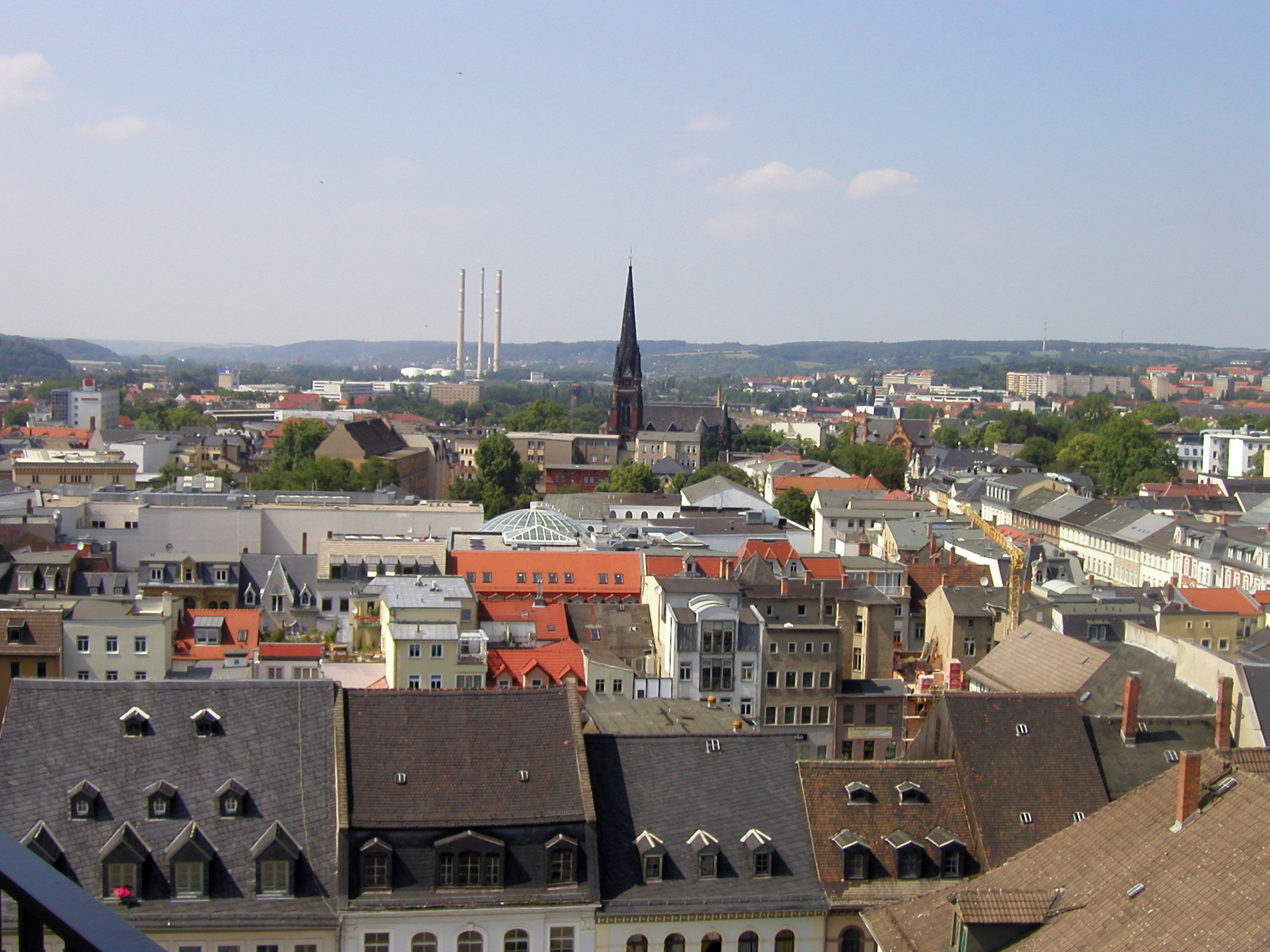
Gera

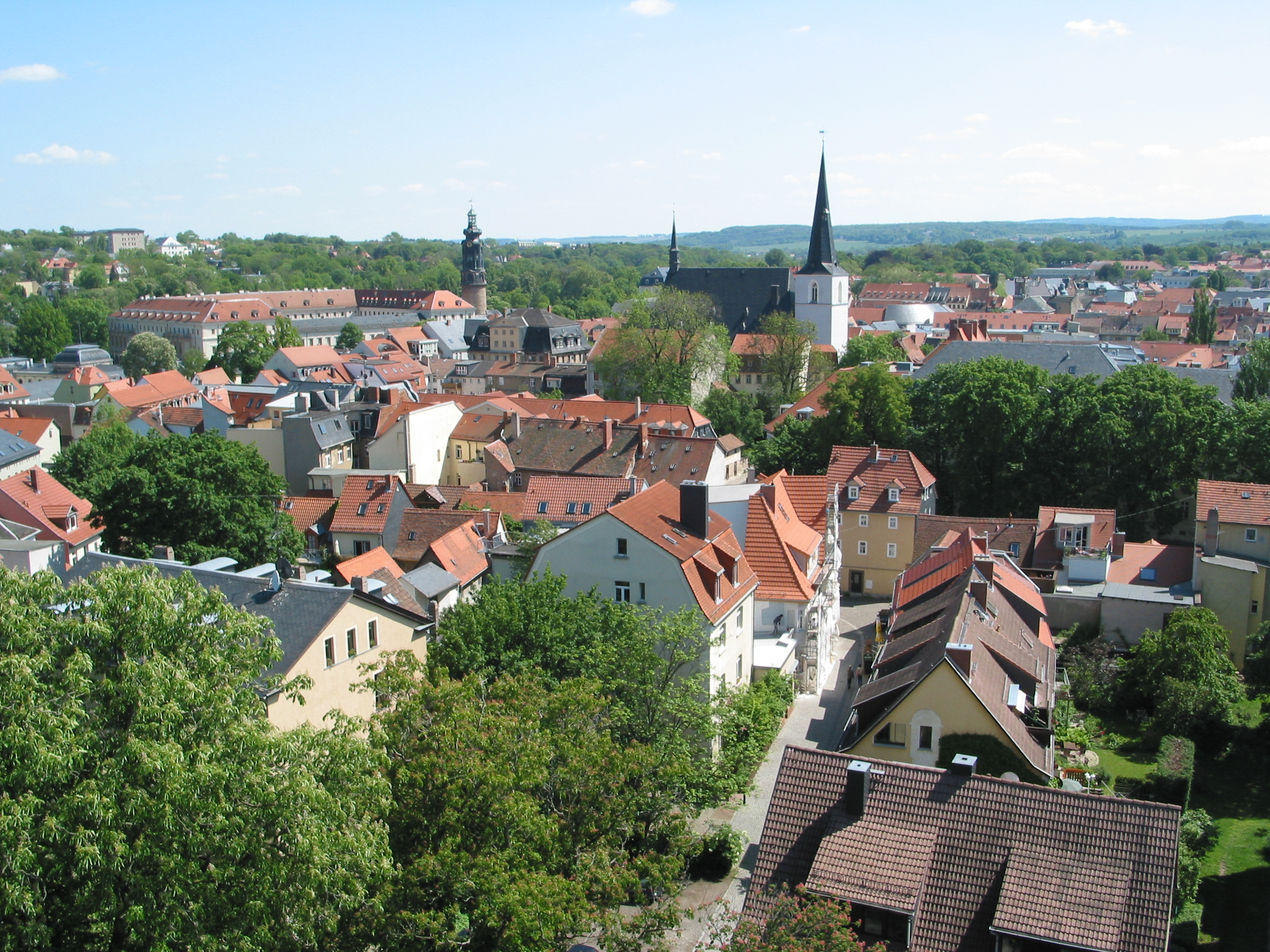
Weimar

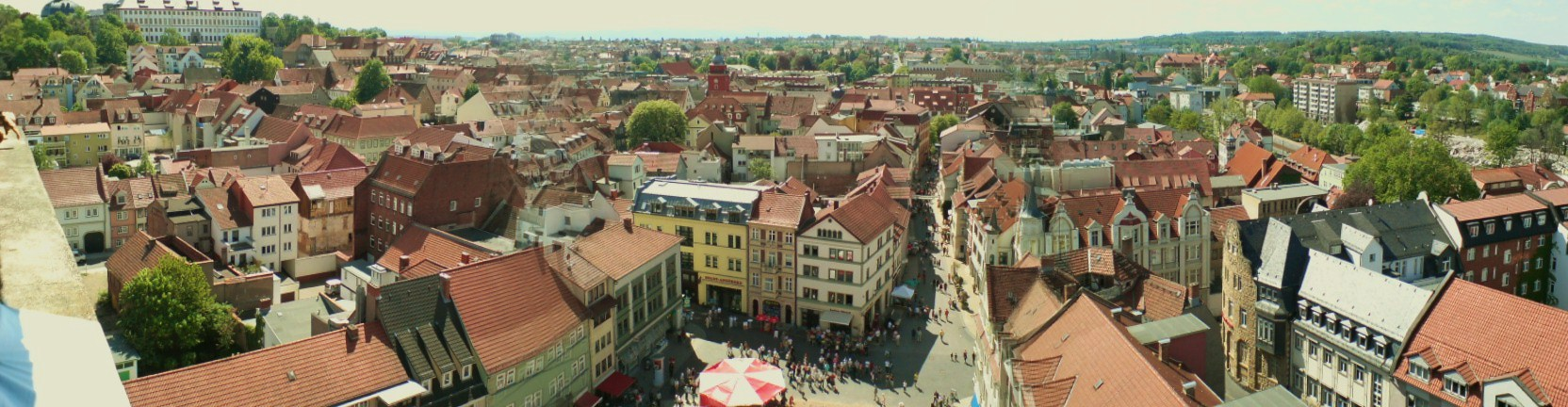
Gotha

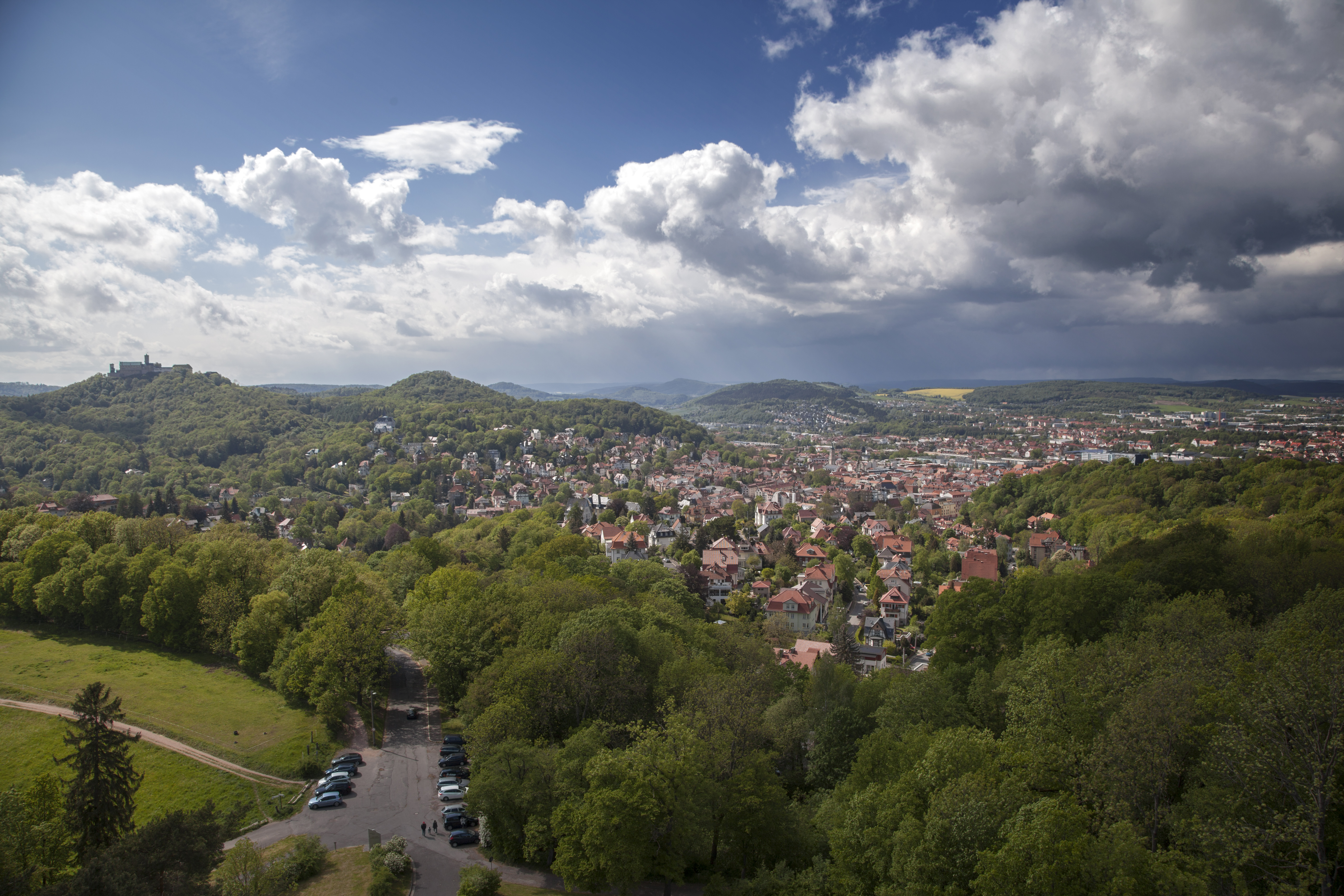
Eisenach

The following table lists the 33 cities and communes in Thuringia with a population of at least 10,000 on December 31, 2025, as estimated by the Federal Statistical Office of Germany. A city is displayed in bold if it is a state or federal capital.

1. The city rank by population as of December 31, 2024, as estimated by the Federal Statistical Office of German
2. The city name
3. The name of the district (Landkreis) in which the city lies (some cities are districts on their own called urban districts)
4. The city population as of May 15, 2022, as enumerated by the 2022 German census
5. The city population as of May 9, 2011, as enumerated by the 2011 European Union census
6. The city land area as of December 31, 2025
7. The city population density as of December 31, 2025 (residents per unit of land area)

2025 rank	City	District	2025 estimate	2022 census	2011 census	2025 land area	2025 pop. density
1	**Erfurt**	urban district	218,793	218,200	200,868	270 km^{2}	810.6/km^{2}
2	Jena	urban district	109,725	110,369	105,739	115 km^{2}	956.0/km^{2}
3	Gera	urban district	95,608	93,120	96,067	152 km^{2}	628.3/km^{2}
4	Weimar	urban district	65,954	65,494	62,764	84.5 km^{2}	780.8/km^{2}
5	Gotha	Gotha	46,400	45,832	44,322	69.6 km^{2}	666.9/km^{2}
6	Nordhausen	Nordhausen	40,767	40,732	42,473	108.2 km^{2}	376.6/km^{2}
7	Eisenach	urban district	40,747	39,931	41,753	104 km^{2}	391.2/km^{2}
8	Ilmenau	Ilm-Kreis	38,834	38,574	39,612	198.7 km^{2}	195.5/km^{2}
9	Mühlhausen/Thüringen	Unstrut-Hainich-Kreis	36,353	36,113	37,421	151.0 km^{2}	240.7/km^{2}
10	Suhl	urban district	34,685	35,410	36,960	141.6 km^{2}	244.9/km^{2}
11	Altenburg	Altenburger Land	31,093	30,224	34,090	45.7 km^{2}	680.5/km^{2}
12	Saalfeld/Saale	Saalfeld-Rudolstadt	29,086	29,106	30,807	145.5 km^{2}	199.9/km^{2}
13	Arnstadt	Ilm-Kreis	28,615	27,869	26,529	105.0 km^{2}	272.5/km^{2}
14	Meiningen	Schmalkalden-Meiningen	25,002	24,962	25,590	123.0 km^{2}	203.2/km^{2}
15	Rudolstadt	Saalfeld-Rudolstadt	24,852	24,684	26,093	135.2 km^{2}	183.9/km^{2}
16	Sonneberg	Sonneberg	22,843	23,064	21,970	84.7 km^{2}	269.7/km^{2}
17	Apolda	Weimarer Land	22,787	22,606	22,079	46.3 km^{2}	492.6/km^{2}
18	Bad Salzungen	Unstrut-Hainich-Kreis	22,557	22,806	24,475	152.0 km^{2}	148.4/km^{2}
19	Sondershausen	Kyffhäuserkreis	20,910	20,971	22,541	201 km^{2}	103.9/km^{2}
20	Leinefelde-Worbis	Eichsfeld	19,957	20,066	20,496	115.8 km^{2}	172.4/km^{2}
21	Greiz	Greiz	19,766	19,883	22,175	84.9 km^{2}	232.9/km^{2}
22	Schmalkalden	Schmalkalden-Meiningen	19,323	18,968	20,127	105.4 km^{2}	183.4/km^{2}
23	Sömmerda	Sömmerda	18,503	18,355	19,613	87.6 km^{2}	211.3/km^{2}
24	Heilbad Heiligenstadt	Eichsfeld	18,230	18,000	18,095	91.5 km^{2}	199.3/km^{2}
25	Bad Langensalza	Unstrut-Hainich-Kreis	16,717	16,717	18,055	129.4 km^{2}	129.2/km^{2}
26	Zeulenroda-Triebes	Greiz	15,677	15,916	17,685	135 km^{2}	116.0/km^{2}
27	Schmölln	Altenburger Land	13,542	13,700	14,724	94.5 km^{2}	143.3/km^{2}
28	Waltershausen	Gotha	12,871	13,192	13,268	60.6 km^{2}	212.3/km^{2}
29	Dingelstädt	Eichsfeld	12,204	12,260	12,780	118.6 km^{2}	102.9/km^{2}
30	Zella-Mehlis	Schmalkalden-Meiningen	12,157	12,323	13,607	53.0 km^{2}	229.4/km^{2}
31	Pößneck	Saale-Orla-Kreis	11,960	11,832	12,445	24.4 km^{2}	489.6/km^{2}
32	Hildburghausen	Hildburghausen	11,632	11,761	11,775	72.9 km^{2}	159.6/km^{2}
33	Eisenberg	Saale-Holzland-Kreis	10,955	10,612	10,619	24.7 km^{2}	444.1/km^{2}
34	Schleusingen	Hildburghausen	10,225	10,583	11,415	125.6 km^{2}	81.4/km^{2}
35	Meuselwitz	Altenburger Land	10,148	10,121	10,964	53.7 km^{2}	189.1/km^{2}
