= Suhl =

City in Thuringia, Germany

- Town
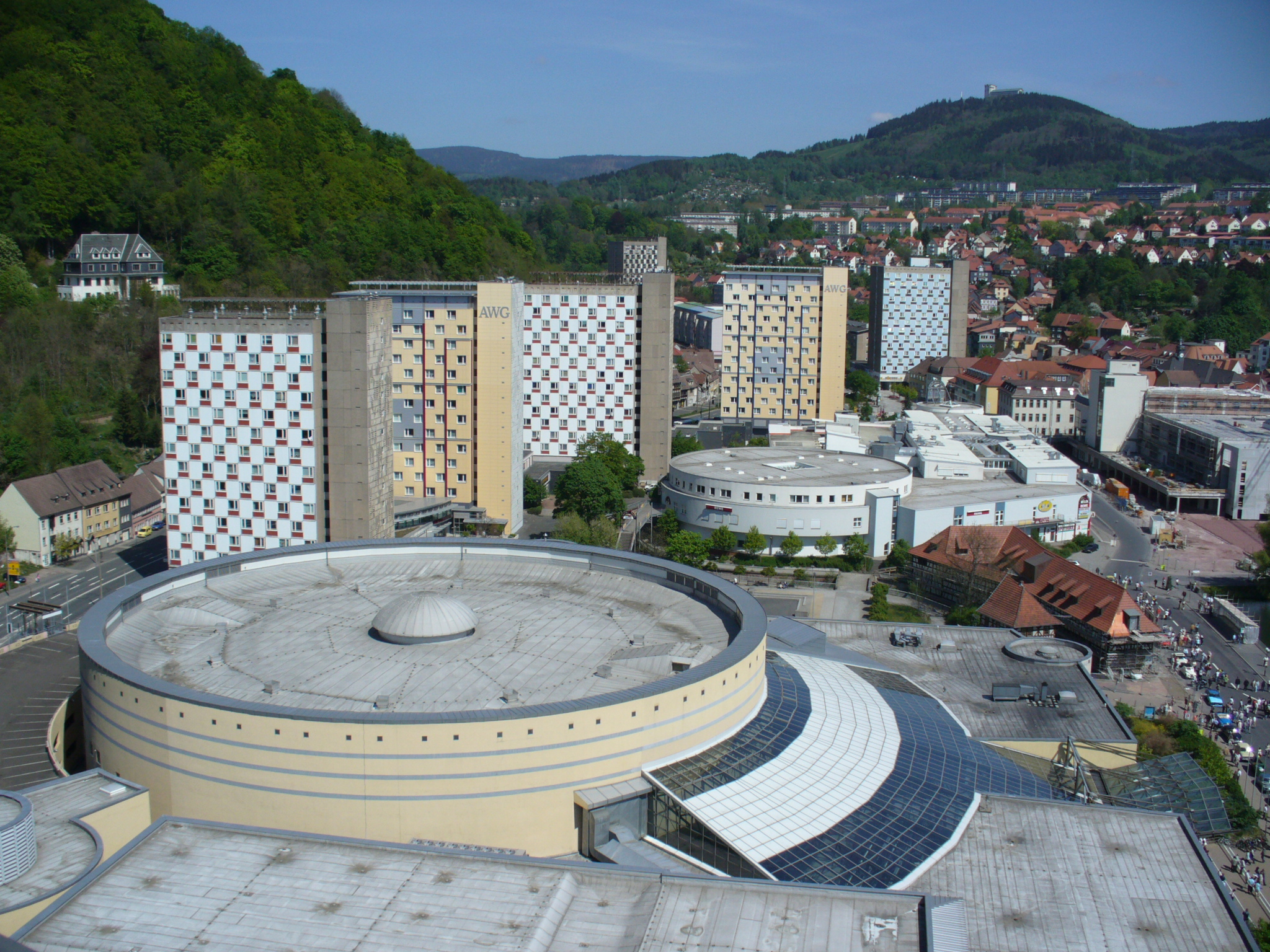
- View over Suhl

- Flag Coat of arms

- Location of Suhl within Thuringia
- Interactive map of Suhl
- Location within Germany Location within Thuringia
- Coordinates: 50°36′38″N 10°41′35″E
- Country: Germany
- State: Thuringia
- District: Urban district
- Subdivisions: Town and 10 districts

Government
  - Mayor (2024–30): André Knapp (CDU)

Area
  - Total: 141.62 km^{2} (54.68 sq mi)
- Elevation: 422 m (1,385 ft)

Population (2025-12-31)
  - Total: 34,685
  - Density: 244.92/km^{2} (634.33/sq mi)
- Time zone: UTC+01:00 (CET)
  - Summer (DST): UTC+02:00 (CEST)
- Postal codes: 98527–98530, 98711
- Dialling codes: 03681, 036846, 036782
- Vehicle registration: SHL
- Website: www.suhltrifft.de

Suhl (German pronunciation: [zuːl]) is a city in Thuringia, Germany, located SW of Erfurt, 110 kilometres (68 miles) NE of Würzburg and 130 kilometres (81 miles) N of Nuremberg. With its 37,000 inhabitants, it is the smallest of the six urban districts within Thuringia. Together with its northern neighbour-town Zella-Mehlis, Suhl forms the largest urban area in the Thuringian Forest with a population of 46,000. The region around Suhl is marked by up to 1,000-meter-high mountains, including Thuringia's highest peak, the Großer Beerberg (983 m), approximately 5 kilometres (3 miles) NE of the city centre.

Suhl was first mentioned in 1318 and stayed a small mining and metalworking town, until industrialization broke through in late 19th century and Suhl became a centre of Germany's arms production, specialized on rifles and guns with companies such as Sauer & Sohn. Furthermore, the engineering industry was based in Suhl with Simson, a famous car and moped producer. In 1952, Suhl became one of East Germany's 14 district capitals, which led to a government-directed period of urban growth and conversion. Its results – a typical 1960s concrete architecture-marked city centre – are defining to the present. With the loss of its administrative and industrial functions, Suhl saw a lasting period of urban decline starting in 1990.

Suhl is known for its sportsmen, especially in shooting, winter sports, and volleyball.

Suhl is a significant setting in science fiction writer Eric Flint’s 1632 series, based on a 20th-century West Virginia town transported through time to Thuringia in the 17th century, most notably in Mike Watson's novel The Marshalls.

== History ==
=== Middle Ages ===
Though first appearing in a 1318 deed, several entries in the annals of Fulda Abbey already mentioned a place named Sulaha between 900 and 1155 AD. The coat of arms from 1365 shows two hammers, indicating the city's most important livelihood: metal processing. The region belonged to the territories held by the Franconian counts of Henneberg since the 11th century. Suhl was located on an important trade route from Gotha, Erfurt and Arnstadt passing the Thuringian Forest mountain range at Oberhof and continuing to the Henneberg's residence, Schleusingen.

=== Early modern period ===
From 1500 onwards, the Henneberg lands belonged to the Franconian Circle of the Holy Roman Empire. Suhl has been a Flecken (small market town) since 1445 and the full municipal rights were granted in 1527, making Suhl one of the youngest cities in present-day Thuringia. Iron ore mining created the basis for the development of Suhl as a centre of gunsmith trade.

The Reformation was introduced in 1544. Several witch-hunts took place in the area from 1553 until the late 17th century. When the Henneberg counts became extinct in 1583, Suhl passed to the Wettin electors of Saxony, where it remained until 1815. Unlike most of present Thuringia, it didn't belong to the Ernestine line of the Wettins, but to the Albertine cadet branch of Saxe-Zeitz from 1660, so that it had been a Saxonian and later Prussian exclave within Thuringia for nearly 300 years.

During the 16th century, iron mining and metalworking saw a boom, finished by the Thirty Years' War, when marauding Croat mercenaries under Imperial general Johann Ludwig Hektor von Isolani burnt down the city in 1634. From about 1690, Duke Moritz Wilhelm of Saxe-Zeitz supported the reconstruction of Suhl as a mining town.

=== Since 1815 ===
The Congress of Vienna in 1815 led to the Saxonian loss of Suhl, which became part of the Prussian Province of Saxony, where it remained from 1815 to 1944 and again shortly in 1945. Staying an exclave within Ernestine territories, Suhl was part of the Schleusingen district until the dissolution of Prussia in 1945.

The later 19th century brought the connection to the railway in 1882 and the industrialisation of the metalworking business. About 1920, Suhl has been a centre of left-wing revolutionary groups, so that the Reichswehr occupied the city (and the neighbour-town Zella-Mehlis) during the Kapp Putsch and ended the workers uprising. After 1935, the military industry saw another boom, caused by the Nazi armament. About 10,000 forced labourers had to work in the city's arms industry after 1940.

The US Army reached Suhl on 3 April 1945 and was replaced by Soviet troops on 1 July 1945. At the same year, Suhl became part of Thuringia, which was replaced by three Bezirks in 1952. Suhl became the capital of the south-western Bezirk Suhl, reaching from Bad Salzungen in the north-west to Sonneberg in the south-east with a population of 550,000. During the GDR period, the upgraded city saw rapid urban growth, which is defining until today.

After the German reunification in 1990, Suhl lost its administrative functions when Thuringia was refounded and replaced the Bezirks. Furthermore, the industry collapsed. Both led to a structural crises, which isn't overcome yet. The population of Suhl declined about 35% since 1988.

=== History of arms production ===
The metal processing of Suhl naturally led, during the Renaissance, to other major local industries, including gunsmithing and armoring. Suhl was a major producer of cannons throughout the seventeenth and subsequent centuries, and Suhl cannons were used by many European powers. A major arms company that was located in Suhl for almost 200 years was J.P. Sauer und Sohn GmbH, producer of hunting rifles, shotguns, and pistols, such as the Sauer 38H, until moving operations to Eckernförde at the end of World War II.

Other prominent firearms manufacturers in Suhl included:

- Simson (also known as BSW and then Gustloff Werke under Nazi rule and Ernst Thälmann Suhl under Communist rule)
- Waffenfabrik August Menz, noted for having produced in the 1920s the Liliput pistol, one of the smallest semiautomatic handguns ever made.
- C.G. Haenel
- The largest manufacturer producing firearms currently in Suhl is Merkel GmbH, which make both rifles and shotguns.

During the Cold War, the East German national shooting arena was located at Suhl, and hosted many top-level competitions, including the 1986 ISSF World Championships. Although surpassed in this respect in the unified Germany by the Olympic shooting centre at Munich, Suhl remains an important place to the sport. It hosts Germany's only school for armorers, and a well equipped museum of weapons.

== Geography ==
=== Topography and geology ===
Suhl is located on the south-western edge of the Thuringian Forest. To the south-west, the Small Thuringian Forest (some foothills of the Thuringian forest) is situated. The terrain is mountainous to all directions, some important mountains are: the Großer Beerberg (983 m, highest one in Thuringia) in the north-east, the Ringberg (745 m), the Döllberg (760 m), the Friedberg (649 m) and the Adlersberg (859 m) in the east, the Steinsburg (641 m) in the south, the Heiliger Berg (513 m), the Domberg (675 m) and the Berg Bock (709 m) in the north-west as well as the Bocksberg (609 m) and the Hoheloh (526 m) within the city. The centre itself is located in an elevation of 450 m and nearly the complete non-build on part of the municipal territory is forested. There are a few small rivers running through Suhl: The Hasel rises at Friedberg in the south-east and runs westward through Suhl, Heinrichs, Mäbendorf, Dietzhausen and Wichtshausen. The Lauter rises on the southern slope of Großer Beerberg mountain and runs through Goldlauter, Lauter and the city centre, before it joins the Hasel behind the station. The Mühlwasser rises on the western slope of Großer Beerberg and runs southward through the northern city parts before it joins the Lauter at the northern city centre.

Suhl sits on the southern edge of the Suhler Scholle, an upthrust granite complex that is streaked by numerous dikes. This is part of the Ruhla-Schleusingen Horst that defines the southwest side of the Thuringian Forest. The southwest side of the Suhler Scholle abuts horizontal sedimentary layers, Buntsandstein (sandstone from the Triassic period) over Zechstein (evaporite deposits from the Permian period). The granite of the Suhler Scholle is capped with Permian sediments and igneous deposits. The higher hills to the northeast are part of the Beerberg Scholle, an irregularly cracked mass of quartz porphyry from the later Permian period.

A band of iron ores follows the fault dividing the Suhler Scholle from the sedimentary rocks to the southwest, while the copper and silver deposits are to the northeast in the Permian deposits above the Suhler Scholle. Southeast of town, there is a significant uranium deposit in the Buntsandstein.

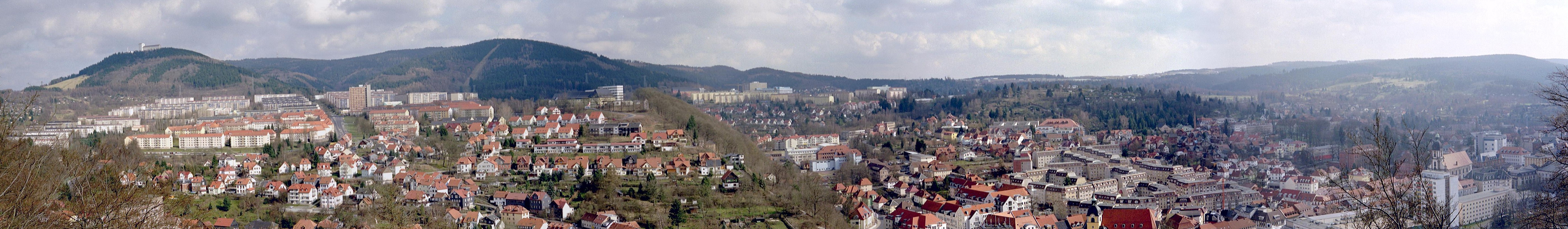
Panoramic view over Suhl and the mountains around

=== Administrative division ===
District map

Suhl abuts the following municipalities: Geratal, Elgersburg and Ilmenau within Ilm-Kreis district in the north-east, Nahetal-Waldau, Sankt Kilian, Eichenberg, Grub, Oberstadt and Schmeheim within Hildburghausen district in the south, Dillstädt and Schwarza in the west as well as Benshausen and Zella-Mehlis in the north within Schmalkalden-Meiningen district.

Some villages were incorporated during the 20th and 21st century to form the present-day districts of Suhl:

- Albrechts (incorporated in 1994)
- Dietzhausen (1994)
- Gehlberg (2019)
- Goldlauter (1979)
- Heidersbach (1979)
- Heinrichs (1936)
- Mäbendorf (1979)
- Neundorf (also: Suhler Neundorf, 1936)
- Schmiedefeld am Rennsteig (2019)
- Vesser (1994)
- Wichtshausen (1994)

=== Cityscape ===
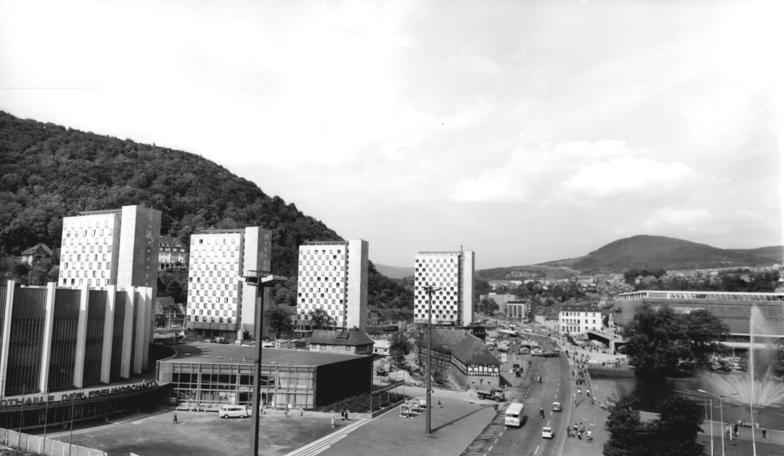
The new city centre in 1974

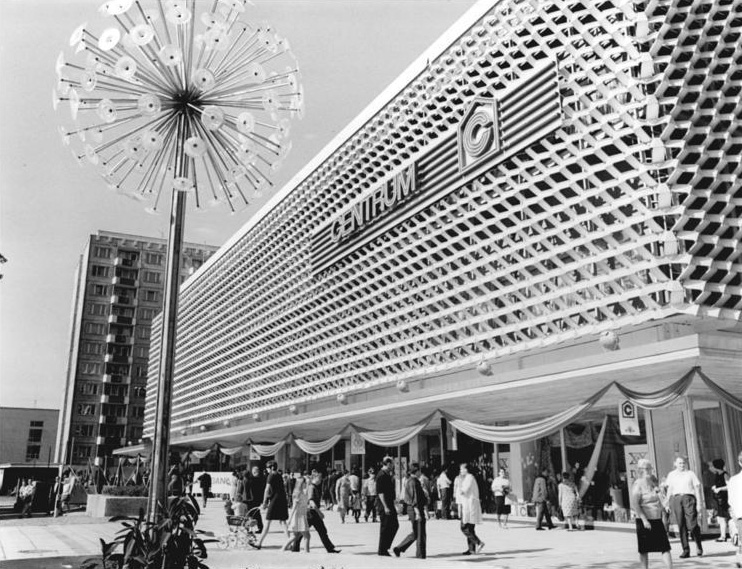
The central mall in 1969

Suhl's cityscape is marked by the lack of flat ground to build on, which is why the city's morphology appears picked and incoherent. The city centre developed during the Middle Ages around the Marktplatz and the Steinweg (as main street) next to the confluence of Lauter and Rimbach river. Later, the city grew to the east and south to the bordering hills and valleys. After World War II, Suhl became the capital of one of the 14 Bezirks in the GDR in 1952. During the following decades, the city more than doubled its population, many Plattenbau settlements developed at the periphery and the centre got largely converted. The old town around Friedrich-König-Straße was demolished during the 1960s, as were the quarters east of Topfmarkt later. They were rebuilt with contemporary concrete architecture and Plattenbau buildings. The new city centre with all the important public buildings was developed around Friedrich-König-Straße, even with large-scale high-rise buildings. After the reunification, the population shrank heavily, leading to high vacancy rates. The government reacted to this by demolishing some of the Plattenbau settlements at the periphery; some buildings stood only for 20 years. Compared with other East German cities, the fight against vacancy was simpler in Suhl, because vacancy was concentrated at the periphery and not in the city centre (as in the most older cities in East Germany), which made it easy to demolish and renature the areas. A larger problem is vacancy in shops in the city centre, because the retail sector in Suhl has also been in a crisis for many years.

== Demographics ==
Year	Population
1525	1,255
1705	4,486
1753	5,189
1806	6,060
1811	5,598
1815	5,922
1841	7,150
3 December 1843 ¹	8,127
1 December 1875 ¹	10,512
1 December 1880 ¹	10,004
1 December 1885 ¹	10,602
1 December 1890 ¹	11,533
2 December 1895 ¹	11,900
1 December 1900 ¹	13,000
1 December 1905 ¹	13,814
1 December 1910 ¹	14,468
1 December 1916 ¹	14,820

Year	Population
5 December 1917 ¹	14,639
8 October 1919 ¹	14,742
16 June 1925 ¹	15,579
16 June 1933 ¹	15,477
17 May 1939 ¹	25,530
1 December 1945 ¹	25,084
29 October 1946 ¹	24,598
31 August 1950 ¹	24,020
31 December 1955	25,215
31 December 1960	25,497
31 December 1964 ¹	28,190
1 January 1971 ¹	31,661
31 December 1975	37,771
31 December 1981 ¹	49,849
31 December 1985	54,392
31 December 1988	56,345
31 December 1990	54,731

Year	Population
31 December 1995	53,591
31 December 1998	50,182
31 December 1999	49,206
31 December 2000	48,025
31 December 2001	46,765
31 December 2002	45,569
31 December 2003	44,529
31 December 2004	43,652
31 December 2005	42,689
31 December 2006	41,861
31 December 2007	41,015
31 December 2008	40,173
31 December 2009	39,526
31 December 2010	38,776
31 December 2011	38,219
31 December 2012	35,967
31 December 2013	35,665

Year	Population
31 December 2014	36,208
31 December 2015	36,778
31 December 2016	35,892

¹ Census

Evolution of population since 1870

The area around Suhl was settled during the later Middle Ages, nevertheless, Suhl stayed a village resp. small town of 1,000 to 2,000 inhabitants during this period. The growth of proto-industrial manufacturing businesses in 17th and 18th century led to a first increase of population up to 6,000 around 1800. During the following decades, the industrial revolution in other German regions led to an economic crisis in Suhl, because of the bad traffic conditions for exporting products. Nevertheless, the population grew further to 10,000 in the 1880s, as the city got finally connected to the railway. Compared to other upcoming cities in Germany, the growth of population stayed slight until 1935, as Suhl counted 15,000 inhabitants. Then, the arm production for World War II brought an economic boom to Suhl and a growth of population up to 26,000 in 1940, which stayed the same until the early 1960s. Between 1960 and 1988, the population grew up to 56,000, forced by the government's expansion of Suhl as a capital of one of the 14 Bezirks in GDR. After the reunification in 1990, the city lost its administrative and economic functions, which led to an extreme decline in population. It shrank to 48,000 in 2000 and 36,000 in 2012. With a decline of more than 35% since 1988, Suhl is among the heaviest shrinking cities in Germany.

The average decrease of population between 2009 and 2012 was approximately 1.68% p. a, which is faster than in bordering rural regions. Suburbanization played only a small role in Suhl. It occurred after the reunification for a short time in the 1990s, but most of the suburban areas were situated within the administrative city borders. During the 1990s and the 2000s, many inhabitants left Suhl to search a better life in west Germany or other major east German cities like Erfurt, Jena or Leipzig. The birth deficit, caused by the high average age of the population, is becoming a bigger problem because there is no immigration to compensate it yet. Urban planning activities to tear down unused flats led to a relatively low vacancy rate of 8% (according to 2011 EU census), compared with a loss in population of more than 35% since 1988.

The birth deficit was 207 in 2012, this is −5.8 per 1,000 inhabitants (Thuringian average: −4.5; national average: −2.4). The net migration rate was −11.5 per 1,000 inhabitants in 2012 (Thuringian average: −0.8; national average: +4.6). The most important target regions of Suhl migrants are other Thuringian regions like Erfurt, Jena and Eisenach same as the western German conurbations.

Like other eastern German cities, Suhl has only a small amount of foreign population: around 1.5% are non-Germans by citizenship and overall 3.9% are migrants (according to 2011 EU census). Differing from the national average, the biggest groups of migrants in Suhl are Russians and Vietnamese people. During recent years, the economic situation of the city improved: the unemployment rate declined from 16% in 2006 to 7% in 2013, which is one of the lowest rates among Thuringia's major cities. Due to the official atheism in former GDR, most of the population is non-religious. 12.6% are members of the Evangelical Church in Central Germany and 2.5% are Catholics (according to 2011 EU census).

== Politics ==
The first freely elected mayor after German reunification was Martin Kummer of the Christian Democratic Union (CDU), who served from 1990 to 2006. He was succeeded by independent Jens Triebel from 2006 to 2018. André Knapp of the CDU was elected in 2018, and has since served as mayor. The most recent mayoral election was held on 26 May 2024, and the results were as follows:

Candidate	Party	Votes	%
André Knapp	Christian Democratic Union	13,572	82.1
Steffen Hartwig	The Left	2,958	17.9
Valid votes		16,530	95.8
Invalid votes		726	4.2
Total		17,256	100.0
Electorate/voter turnout		30,226	57.1
Source: Wahlen in Thüringen

The most recent city council election was held on 26 May 2024, and the results were as follows:

Party	Lead candidate	Votes	%	+/-	Seats	+/-
Christian Democratic Union (CDU)	André Knapp	18,541	37.2	▲7.7	13	▲2
Alternative for Germany (AfD)	Henry Kraus	11,825	23.8	▲11.7	9	▲5
Free Voters (FW)	Jens Triebel	5,717	11.5	▼7.8	4	▼3
The Left (Die Linke)	Philipp Weltzien	5,352	10.8	▼7.5	4	▼3
Social Democratic Party (SPD)	Annette Nagel	3,014	6.1	▼5.8	2	▼2
Citizens for Suhl (BfS)	Michael Brüßler	2,357	4.7	New	2	New
Alliance 90/The Greens (Grüne)	Bernhard Hofmeier	1,810	3.6	▼2.1	1	▼1
Free Democratic Party (FDP)	Andreas Schmidt	1,161	2.3	▼1.0	1	0
Valid votes		49,777	100.0			
Invalid balltos		539	3.1			
Total ballots		17,339	100.0		36	±0
Electorate/voter turnout		30,226	57.4	▲2.7		
Source: Wahlen in Thüringen

== Economy and infrastructure ==
=== Agriculture, industry and services ===
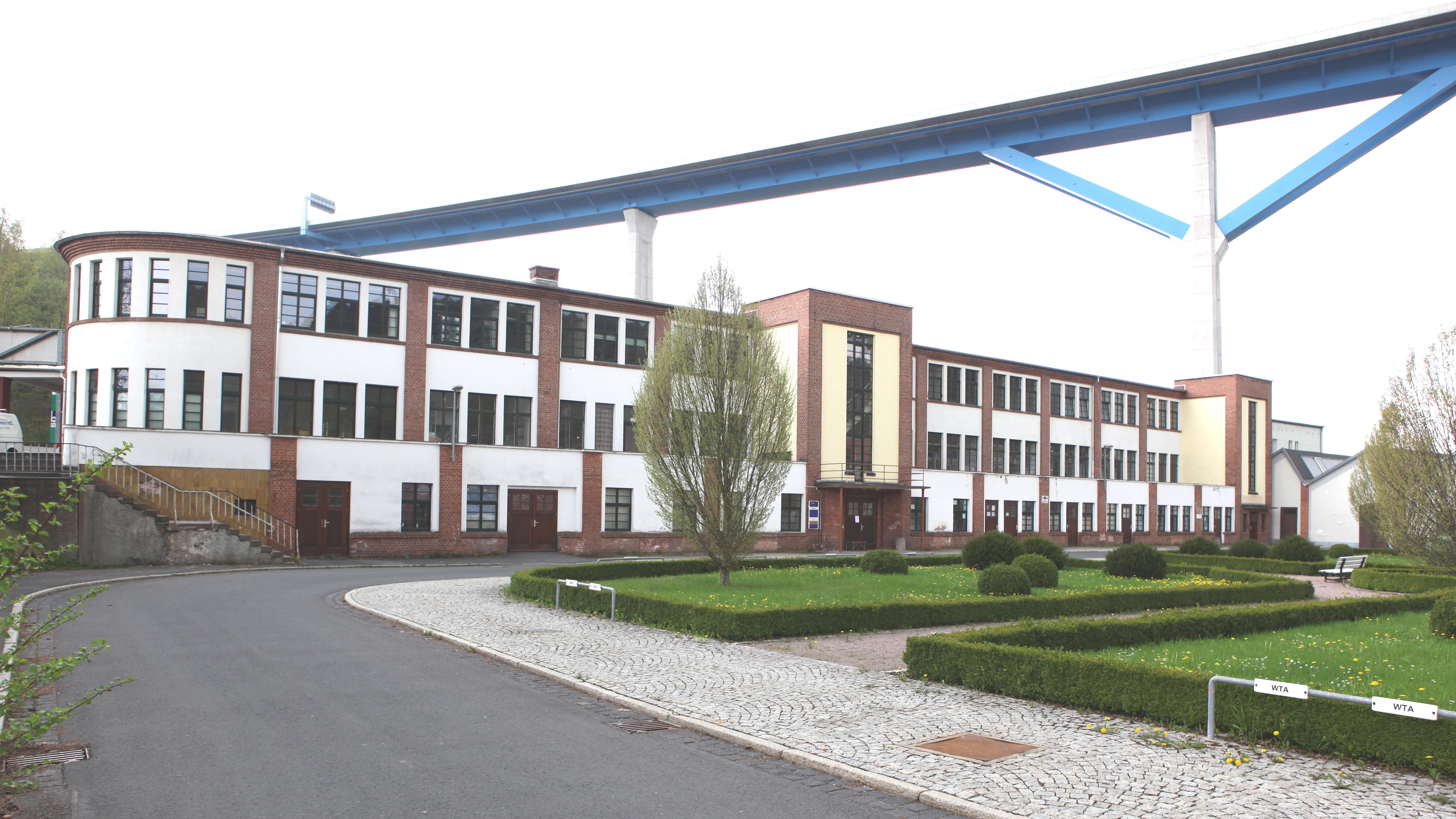
A building of the former Simson factory with A 73's Haseltal bridge in background

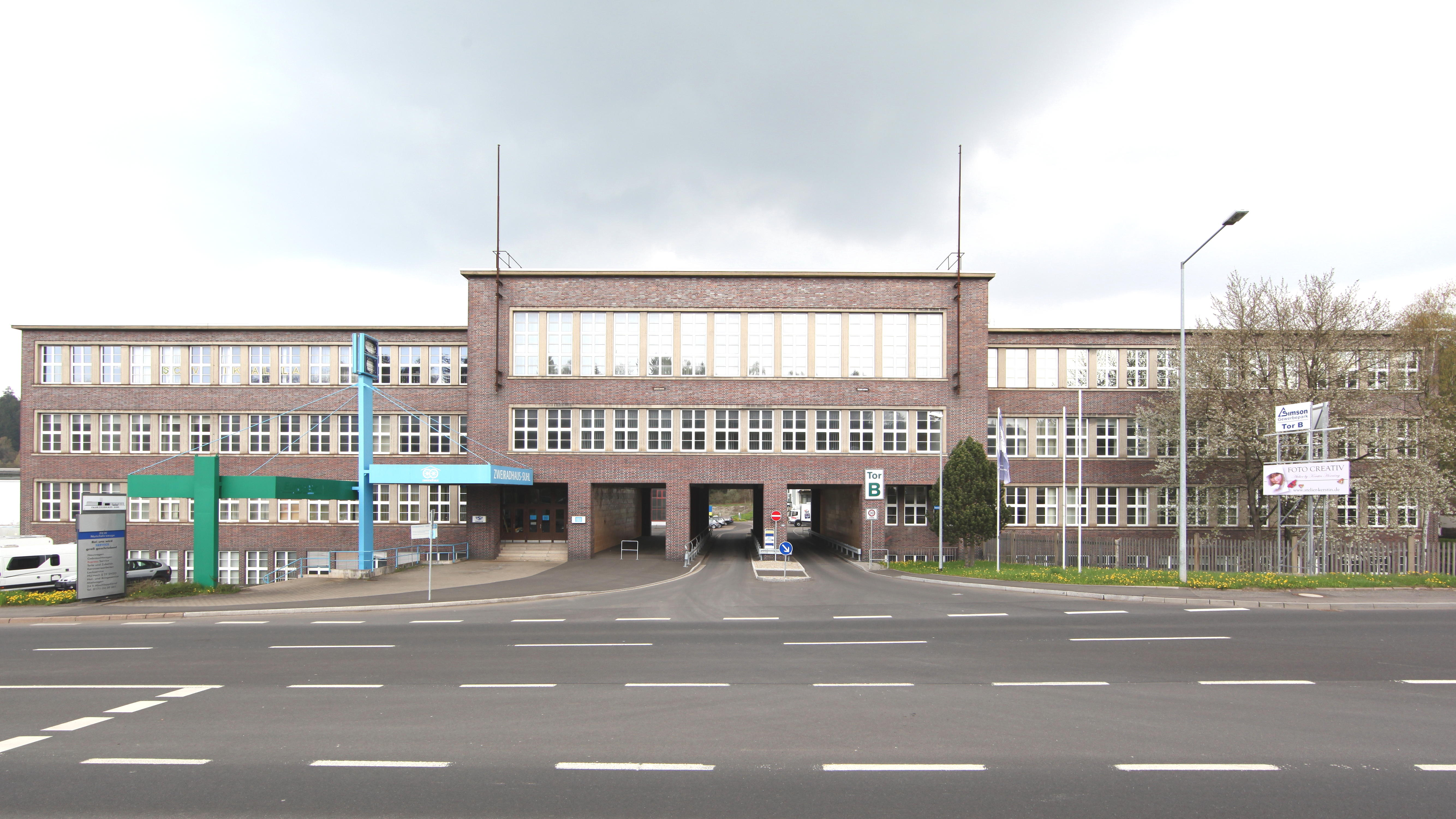
Another former Simson building

Agriculture plays no role in Suhl, only 17% of the municipal territory are in agricultural use. The soil isn't very fertile and the climate is harsh, the most cultivated strains are maize and rapeseed, furthermore there is cattle farming on some areas. On the other hand, 63% of the territory is forest, so wood production does play a role in Suhl.

Suhl's industry has always been based on metalworking. In the past, the city was a leading arms producer in Germany and the vehicle production was another pillar of the local industry. After the reunification in 1990, the industry collapsed and the most factories got closed. Important companies of today are CDA, a producer of data replication media, Zimbo, a meat producer, Gramss, an industrial bakery, Paragon, a car parts supplier, and Merkel, the last remained arms producer in Suhl. In 2012, there were 27 companies in industrial production with more than 20 workers employing 2,000 persons and generating a turnover of €295 million.

Services in Suhl are including the typical regional supply (like retail, hospital, cinema etc.) and some preserved administrative functions over the surrounding districts like the Industrie- und Handelskammer and the regional centres of Arbeitsagentur and Rentenversicherung. Furthermore, tourism plays a role because of the beautiful landscape around. In 2012, there were 93,000 hotel guests having 245,000 overnight stays in Suhl.

=== Transport ===
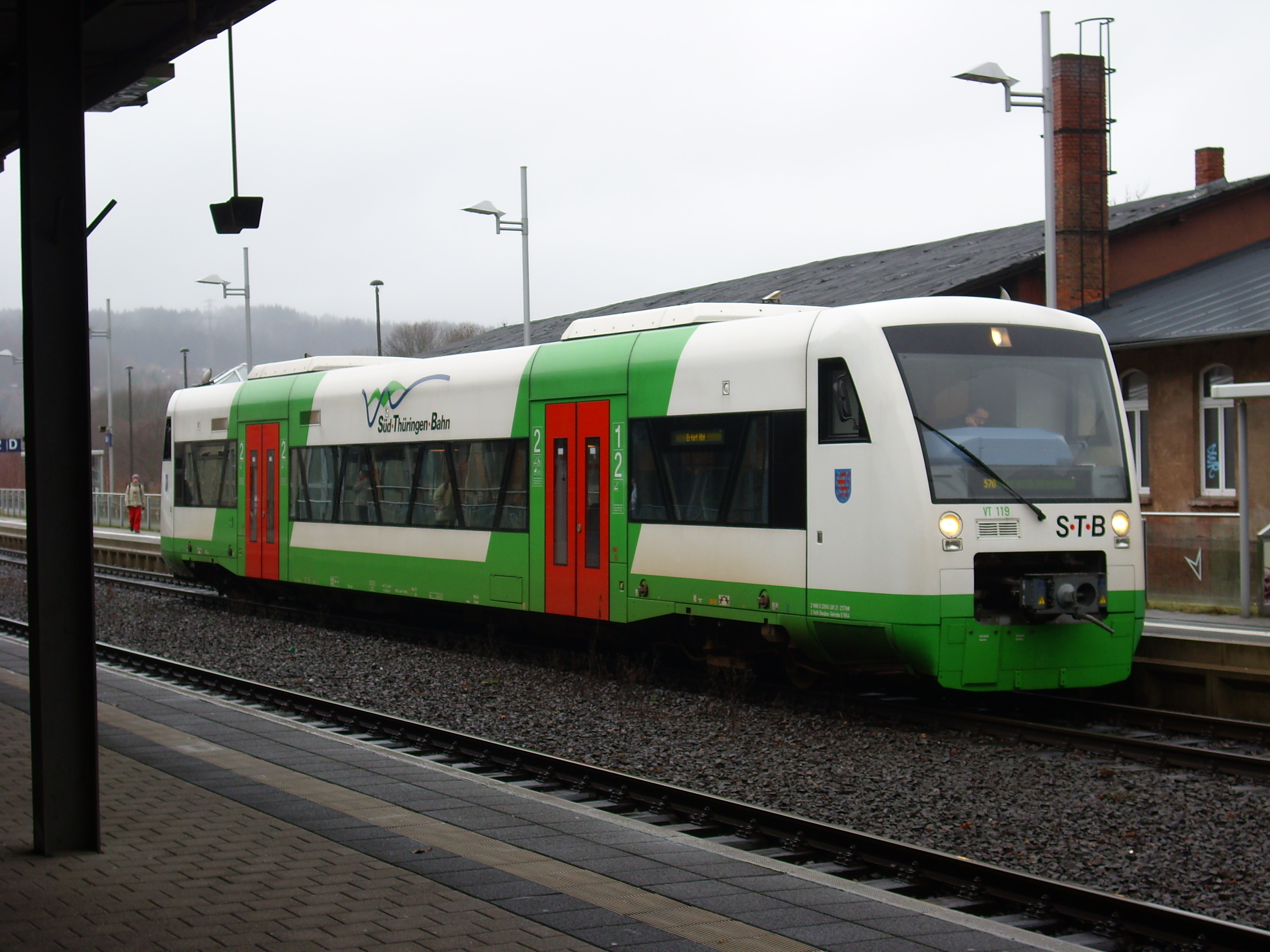
Local train to Erfurt at Suhl station

Suhl connected to the railway quite late, because of its hilly terrain. The Neudietendorf–Ritschenhausen railway through the city was opened in 1882 (southern direction to Würzburg) and in 1884 (northern direction to Erfurt). It was one of only few main mountain railways in Prussia with the large, 3,039 metres (9,970 ft) long Brandleite Tunnel north of the city. Later, this railway became an important link between Berlin and south-western Germany, until the inner-German border cut it off in 1949. Since that time, there is only regional traffic on the line (except a short time in 1990s with long-distance trains). The express train runs every two hours to Erfurt in the north and Würzburg in the south, where connections to long-distance trains are given. Furthermore, there are local trains to Erfurt and Meiningen, running also every two hours, so that there is overall a connection once an hour in both directions. Another railway to Schleusingen was opened in 1911 and closed in 1997. With a gradient of nearly 7%, it was one of the steepest regular railways in Germany. Stations in Suhl besides the main station are located in Heinrichs and Dietzhausen, whereas the Stations Suhler Neundorf and Friedberg at the Schleusingen line are abandoned.

Suhl is situated at the junction of Bundesautobahn 71 (Erfurt–Würzburg) and Bundesautobahn 73 (Suhl–Nuremberg). Both got opened during the 2000s and host some impressive bridges and tunnels around Suhl, like the Rennsteig Tunnel in the north and the 82 m high Haseltalbrücke at Heinrichs district. A Bundesstraße through Suhl was the Bundesstraße 247 from Gotha in the north to Schleusingen in the south. It was annulled after the opening of both Autobahns and is now a secondary road. Other important secondary roads run to Meiningen in the west and Ilmenau in the east.

Biking is getting more and more popular since the construction of quality cycle tracks began in the 1990s. For tourism serve the Hasel track from Suhl to the Werra valley near Meiningen. Furthermore, there are some mountainbiking tracks within the Thuringian Forest.

Public transport is carried out by a bus line network connecting the city centre with the outskirts, Zella-Mehlis and neighbouring villages. A trolleybus system was planned during the late 1980s, but not realized after the reunification.

== Education ==
There is only one Gymnasium school left in Suhl, after others were closed due to the decline of the number of children after 1990.

== Culture ==
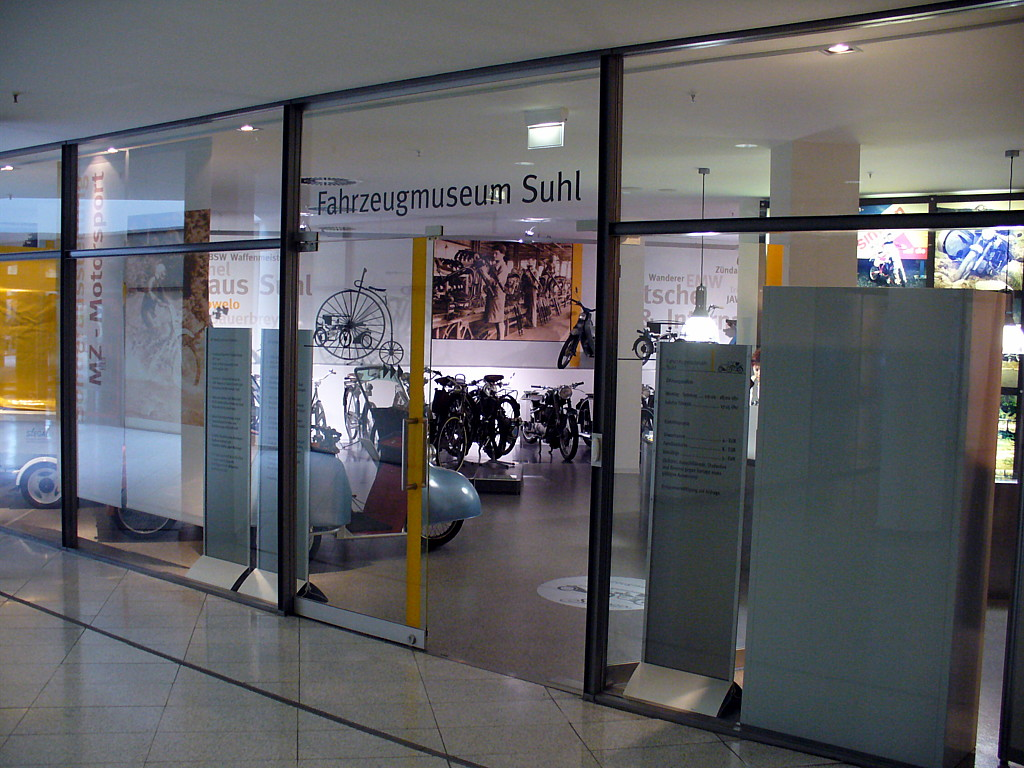
Fahrzeugmuseum (entrance)

There are some museums and other cultural institutions in Suhl:

- The Waffenmuseum at Friedrich-König-Straße shows an exhibition about the history of arms production in Suhl.
- The Fahrzeugmuseum at Kongresszentrum hosts an exhibition of vehicles produced by Simson.
- The Galerie im Atrium at Kongresszentrum shows temporary exhibitions of art.
- The Schul- und Volkssternwarte Suhl is the city's observatory and planetarium, with the first ZEISS SKYMASTER ZKP 2 projector, which is still in use, at Hoheloh hill, south-west of the city centre.
- The Tierpark Suhl is the zoological garden of the city at Carl-Fiedler-Straße on the eastern city border.
- The municipal orchestra, founded in 1953 and based in the Kulturhaus at Friedrich-König-Straße was closed in 2009, rebuilt and now in use as city archive.

== Sights ==
The most significant sights in Suhl are:

- St. Mary's Church is the evangelical main parish church of Suhl, built between 1753 and 1756 in late-Baroque style
- The Holy Cross Church is the second evangelical parish church at Steinweg, built between 1731 and 1739 in Baroque style.
- The Holy Cross Chapel behind the eponymous church is one of the oldest buildings in Suhl, established in 1618 Gothic style.
- The town hall at Marktplatz was built between 1812 and 1817 and modified in 1913 to Neo-Baroque style.
- The Malzhaus at Friedrich-König-Straße was built around 1650 and hosts the Waffenmusuem today.
- The Kulturhaus at Friedrich-König-Straße was built in 1957 in Neo-Classicist style and demolished in 2013. Only the façade and the lobby remained.
- Some buildings of the former Simson factory between the Heinrichs and Mäbendorf districts in Bauhaus-modern architecture of 1920s and 1930s remained.
- The new municipal library at Bahnhofstraße was built in 2004 in form of a glass cube.
- Some older buildings remained in the district of Heinrichs (including the church, town hall and some picturesque timber-framed houses) west of the city centre.

=== Image gallery ===
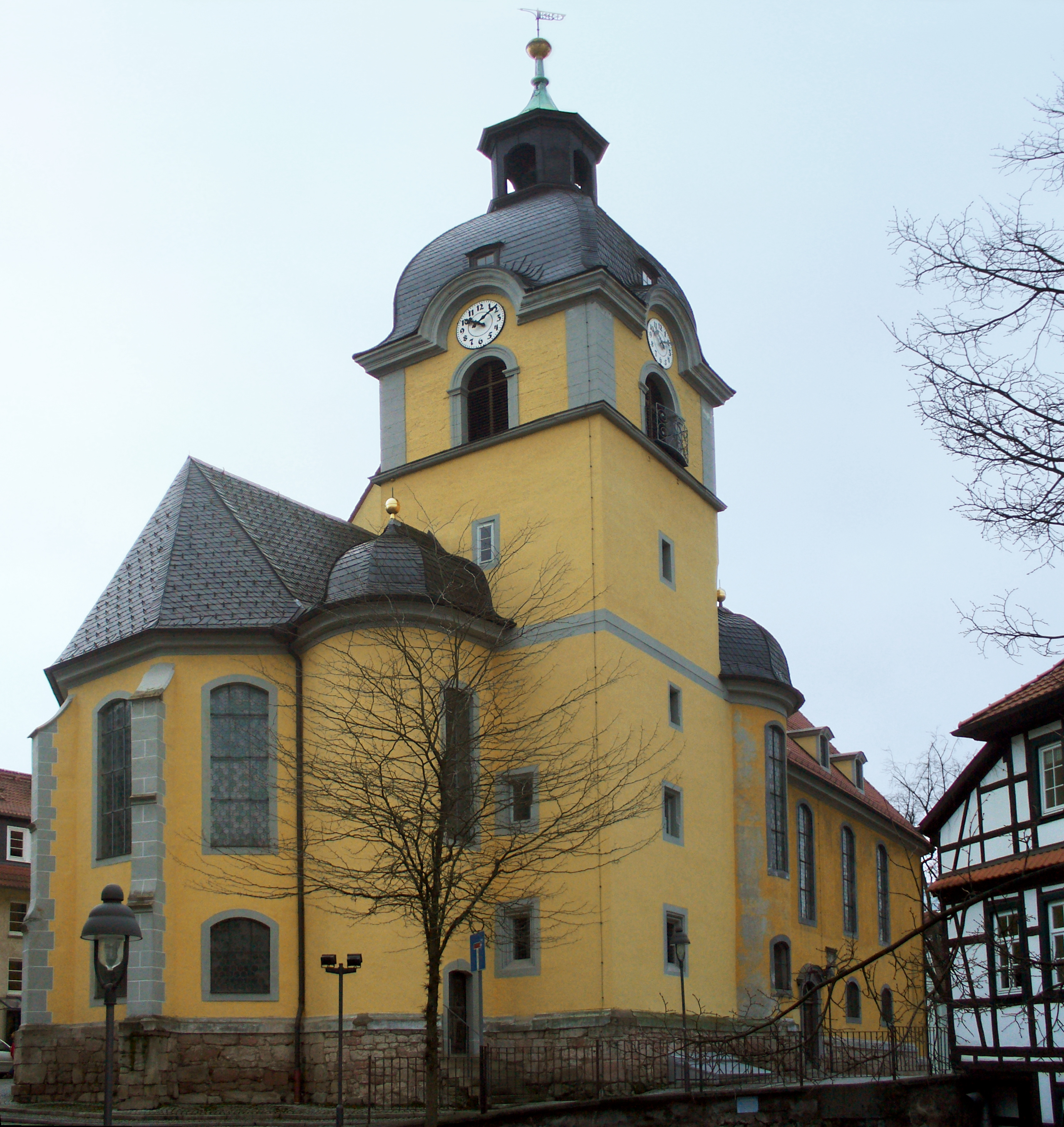
St. Mary's Church

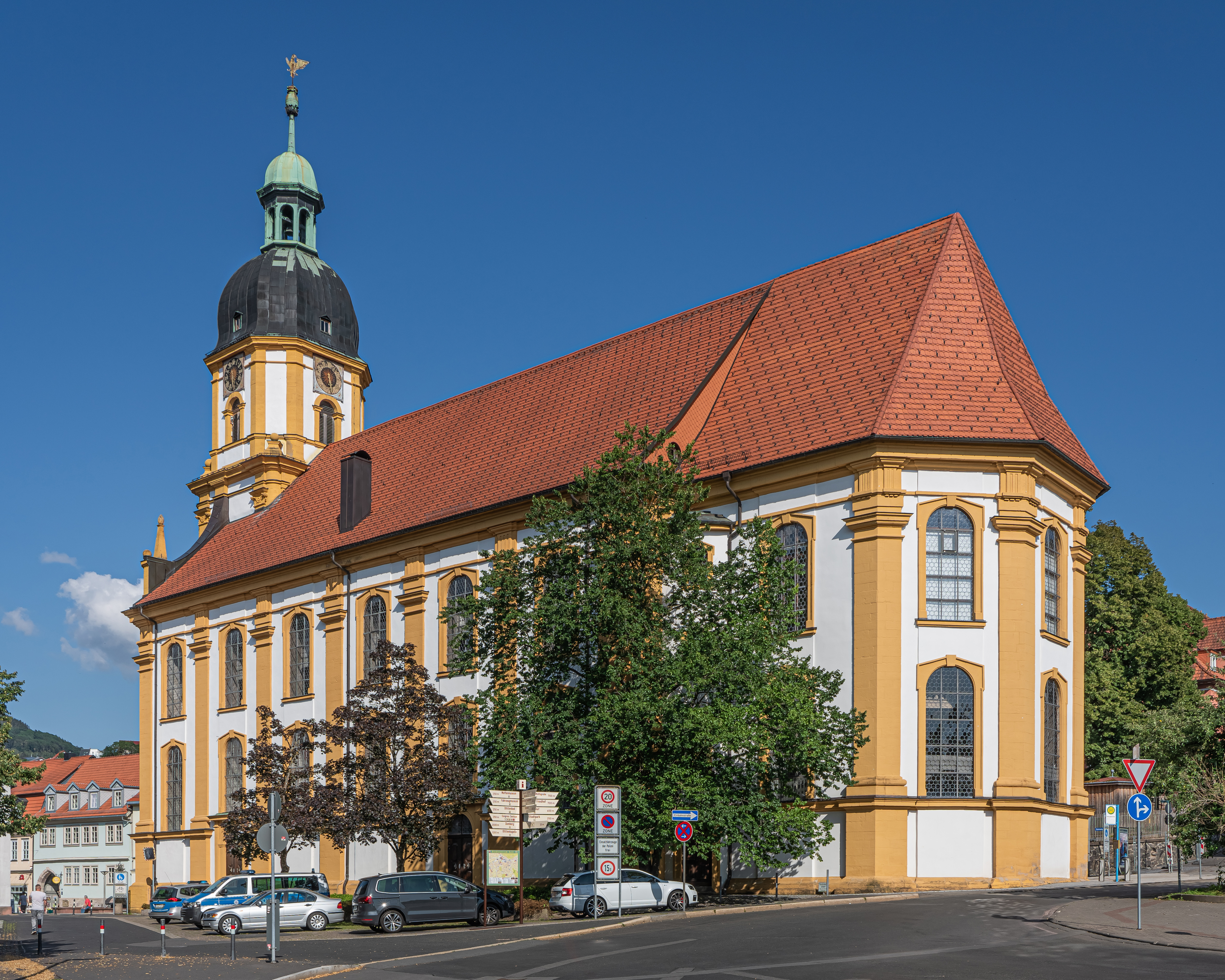
Holy Cross Church

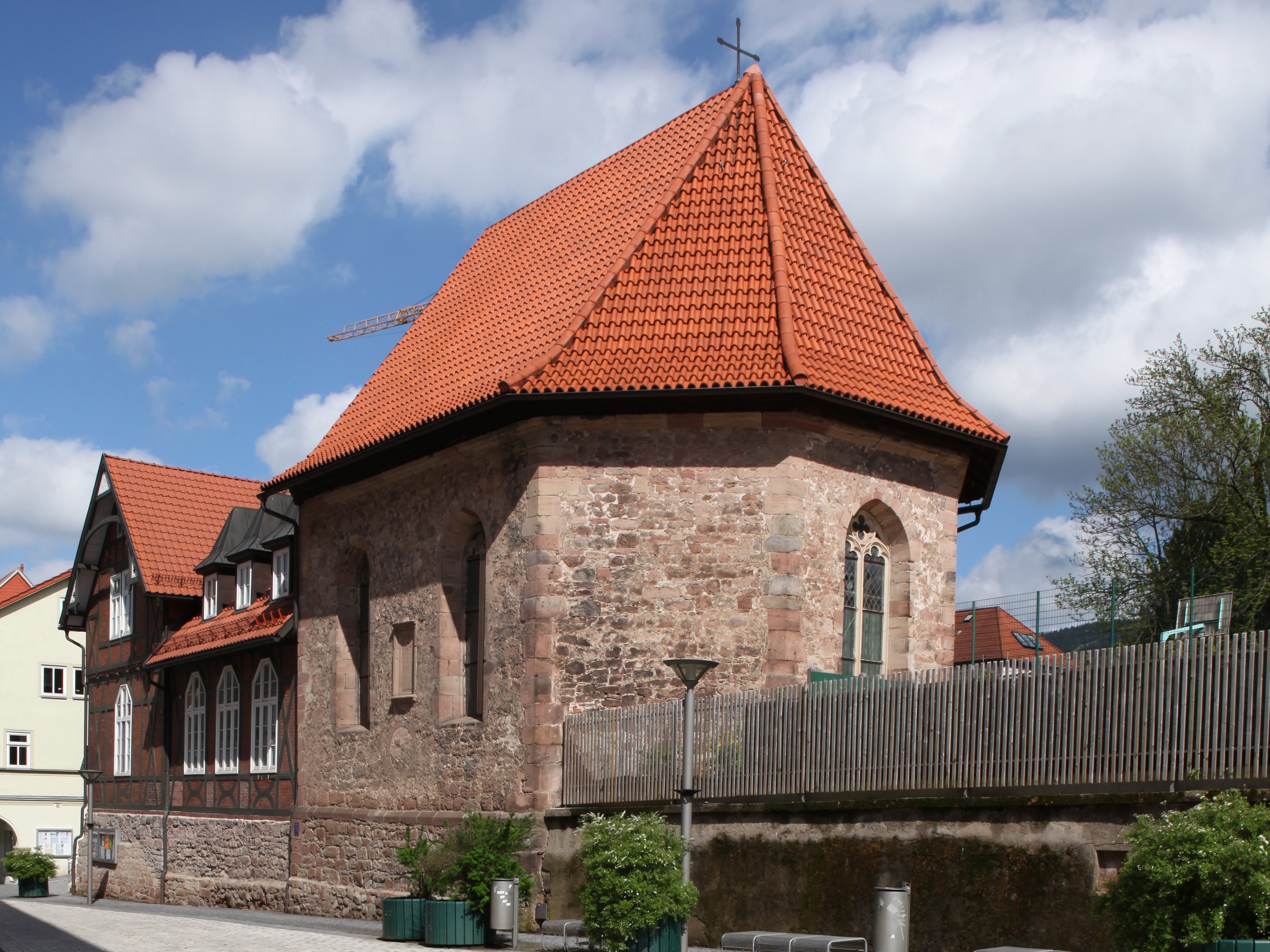
Holy Cross Chapel

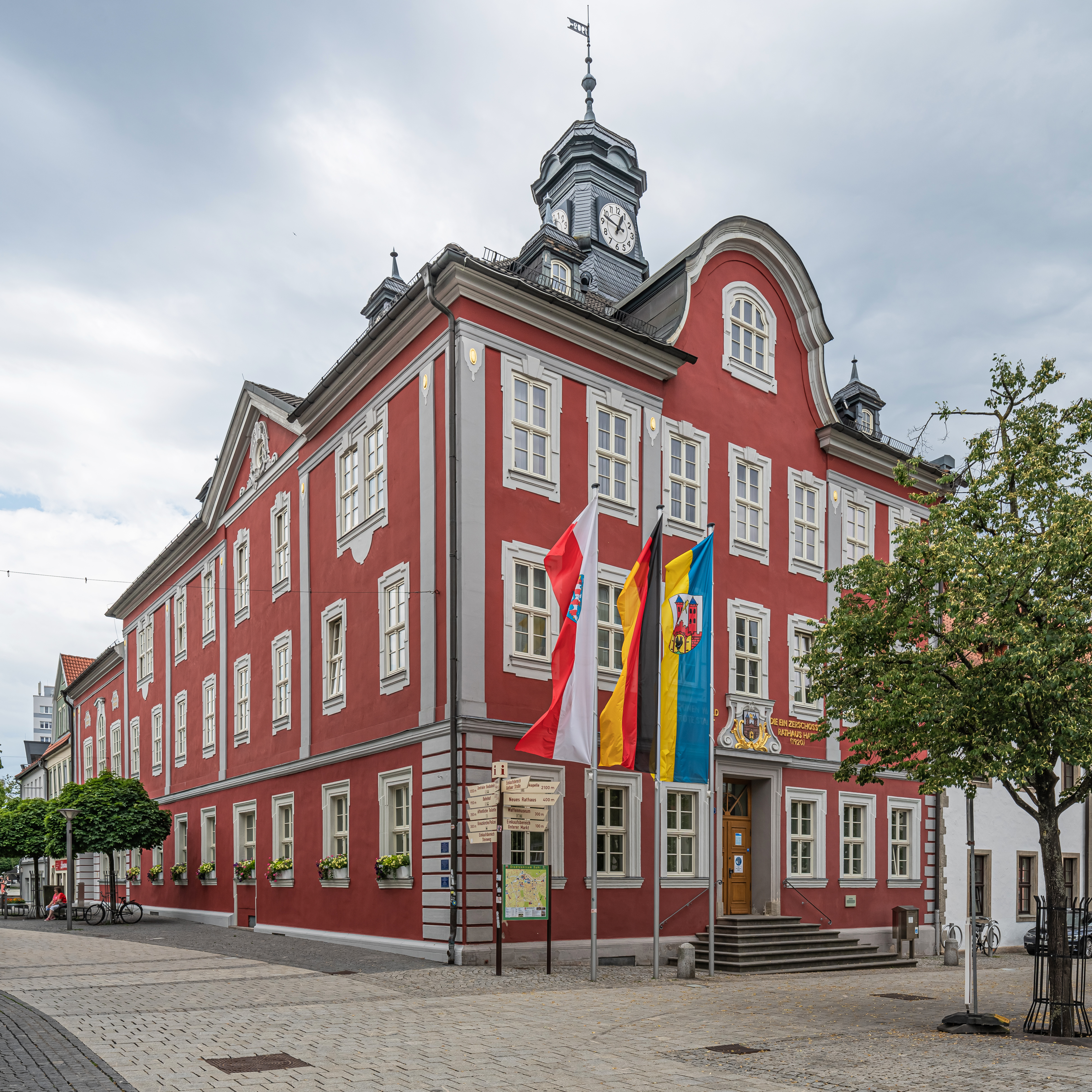
Town hall

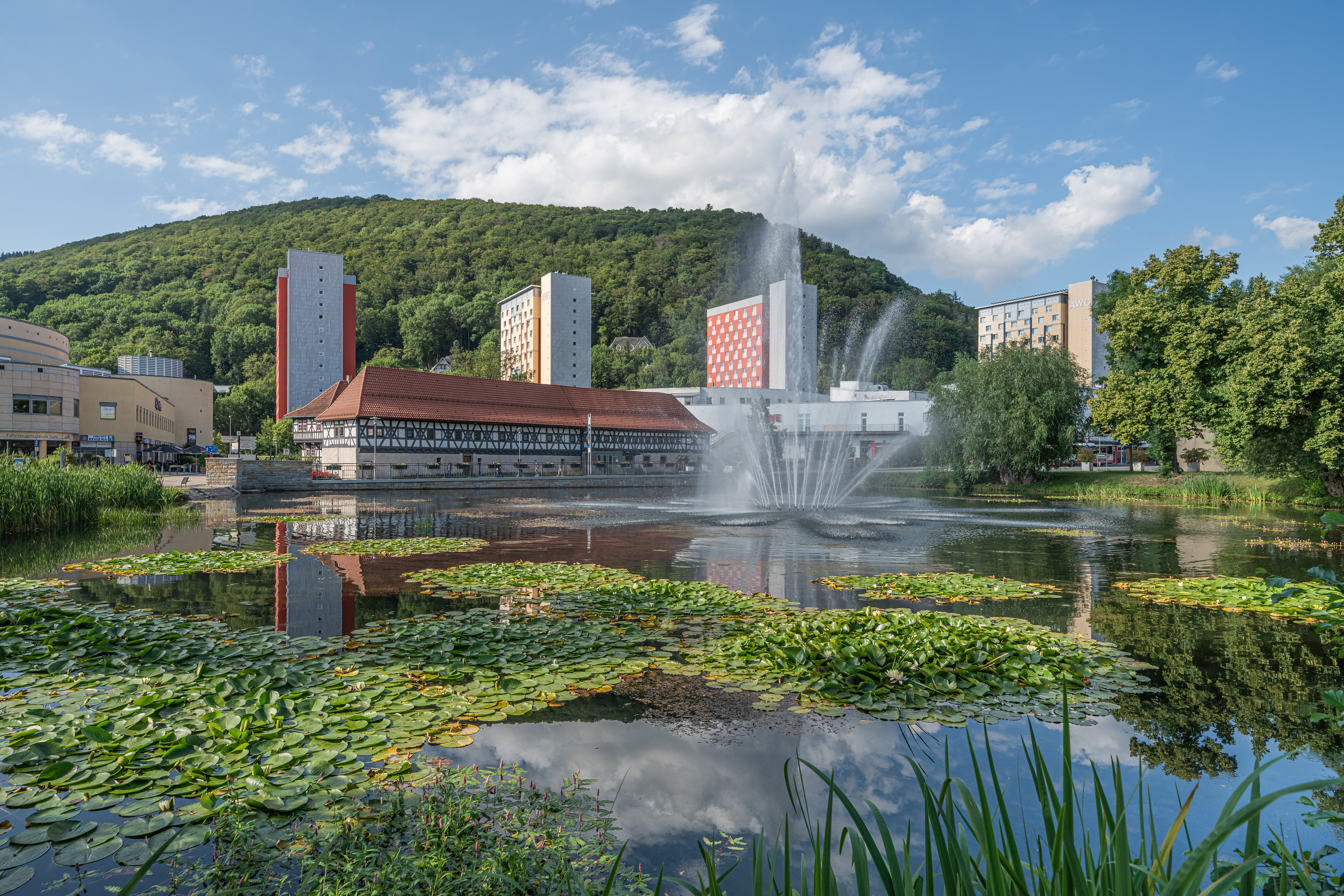
Malzhaus hosting the arms museum

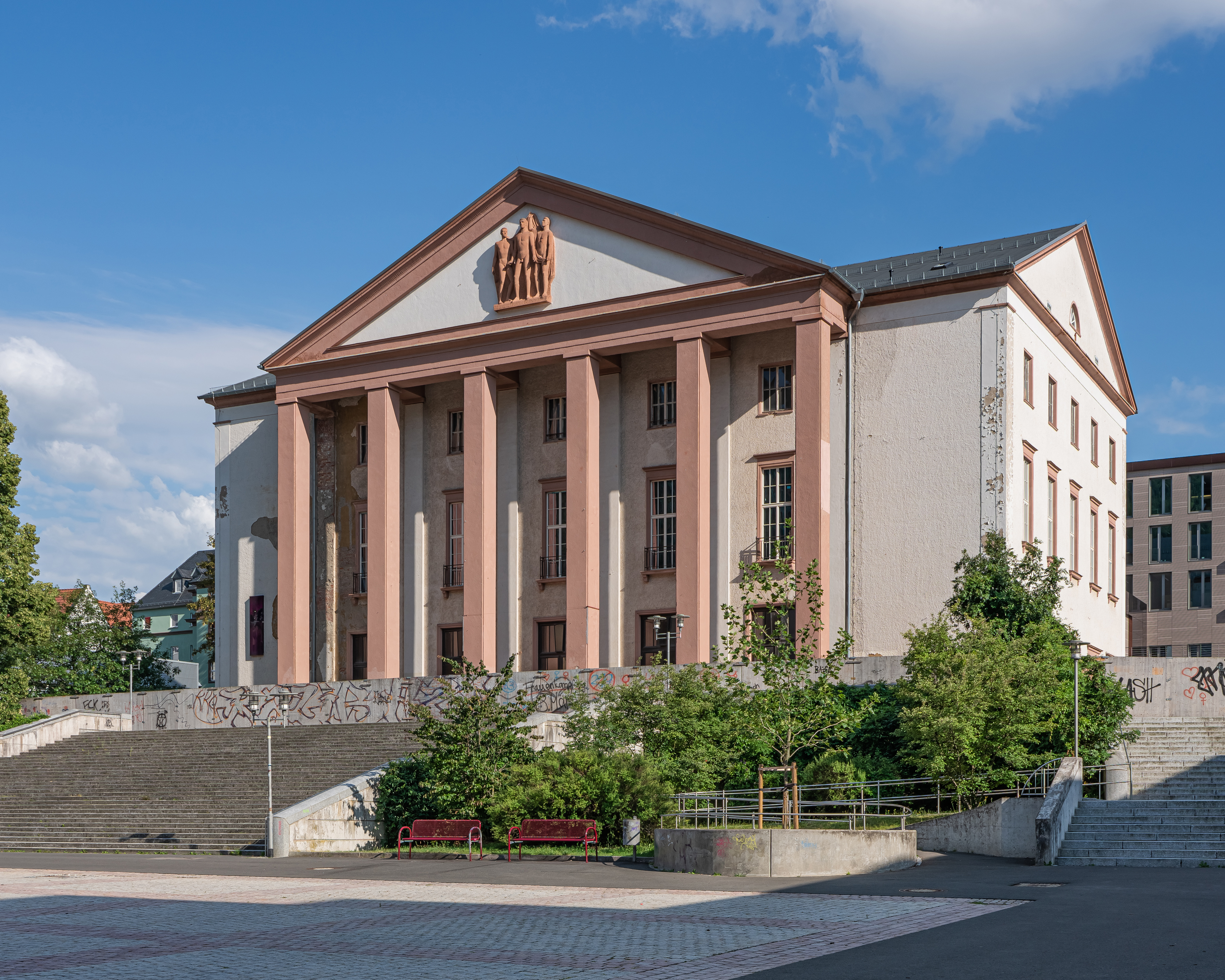
Kulturhaus

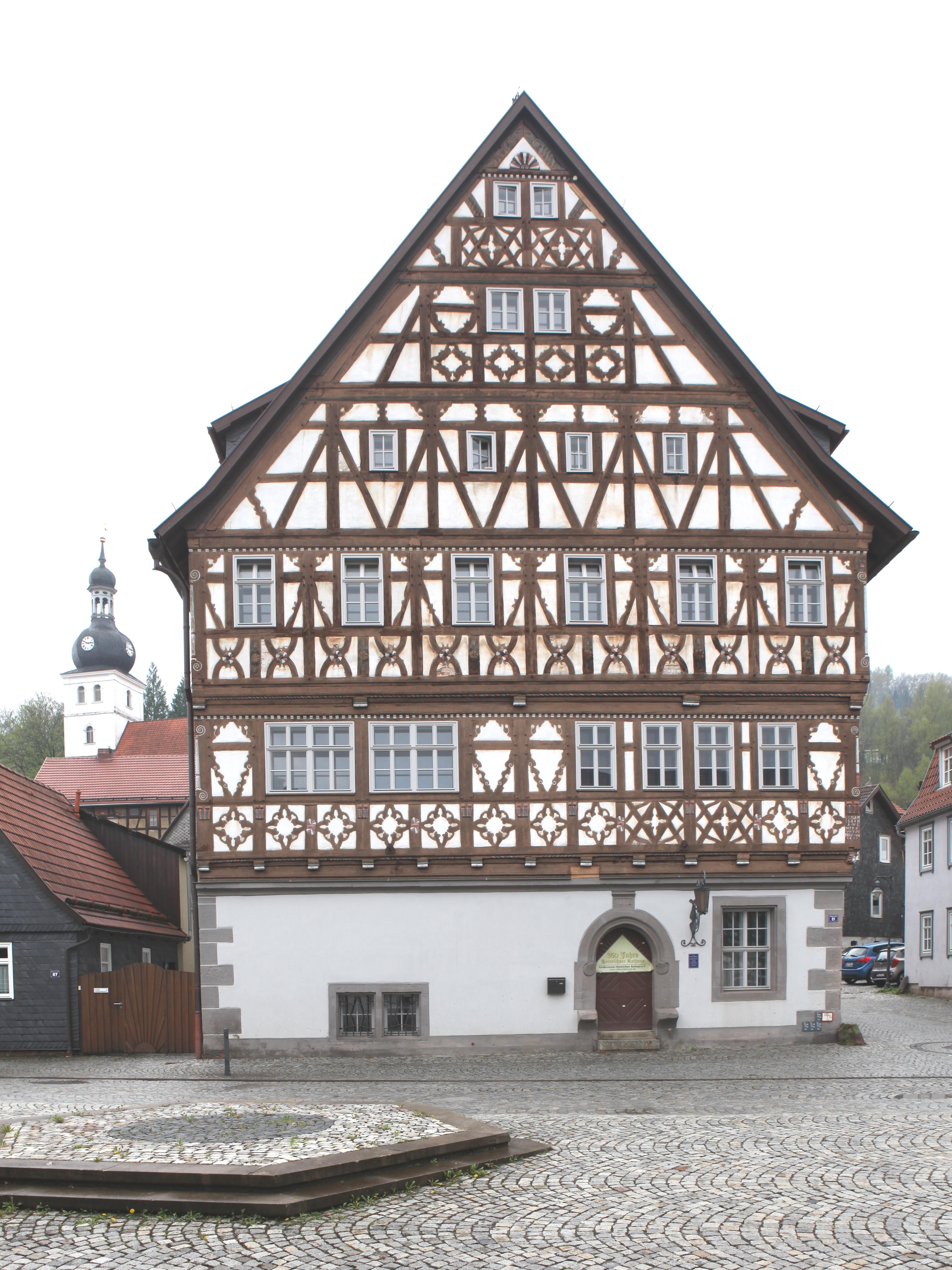
Town hall of Heinrichs district

== Twin towns – sister cities ==
Suhl is twinned with:

- České Budějovice, Czech Republic
- Bègles, France
- Kaluga, Russia
- Lahti, Finland
- Leszno, Poland
- Smolyan, Bulgaria
- Würzburg, Germany

In October 2024 the city council voted to turn down a request from the Ukrainian city of Podilsk.

== Notable people ==
- Friedrich Wilhelm Adami (1816–1889), journalist
- Christoph Bach (1613–1661), composer
- Georg Christoph Bach (1642–1697), composer, progenitor of the Frankish Bach-line, from 1661 to 1668 cantor and schoolmaster in Heinrichs in Suhl
- Wilhelm Cuno (1876–1933), politician and businessman, German chancellor 1922–1923
- Claus Peter Flor (born 1953), conductor
- Paul Greifzu (1902–1952), racing driver and racecar constructor
- Corinna Harfouch (born 1954), actress
- Sandra Hüller (born 1978), actress
- Johann Peter Kellner (1705–1772), composer and organ builder
- Friedrich Koenig (1774–1833), contributed as an inventor of the flatbed press a decisive contribution to the development of the printing industry and worked for some time in Suhl
- André Lange (born 1973), bobsledder, multiple Olympic and world champion
- Hugo Schmeisser (1884–1953), developer of infantry weapons
- Louis Schmeisser (1848–1917), weapon technical designer
- Moses Simson (1808–1868) and Lob Simson (1806–1862), founders of the Simson works
