= Grimmelshausen (disambiguation) =

Grimmelshausen is a municipality in the district of Hildburghausen, in Thuringia, Germany.

Grimmelshausen may also refer to:

- Hans Jakob Christoffel von Grimmelshausen, a German author
- Grimmelshausen-Preis, a German literary award
