= Lengfeld =

- Municipality
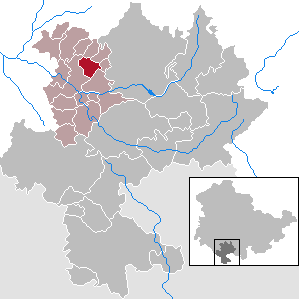
- Location of Lengfeld within Hildburghausen district
- Interactive map of Lengfeld
- Location within Germany Location within Thuringia
- Coordinates: 50°31′N 10°39′E
- Country: Germany
- State: Thuringia
- District: Hildburghausen
- Municipal assoc.: Feldstein

Government
  - Mayor (2022–28): Ralf Geyer

Area
  - Total: 6.64 km^{2} (2.56 sq mi)
- Elevation: 365 m (1,198 ft)

Population (2025-12-31)
  - Total: 365
  - Density: 55.0/km^{2} (142/sq mi)
- Time zone: UTC+01:00 (CET)
  - Summer (DST): UTC+02:00 (CEST)
- Postal codes: 98660
- Dialling codes: 036873
- Vehicle registration: HBN
- Website: www.lengfeld.net

Lengfeld is a municipality in the district of Hildburghausen, in Germany.
