= Nahetal-Waldau =

- Municipality
- Interactive map of Nahetal-Waldau
- Location within Germany Location within Thuringia
- Coordinates: 50°31′9″N 10°47′51″E
- Country: Germany
- State: Thuringia
- District: Hildburghausen
- Disbanded: 2018

Area
  - Total: 32.97 km^{2} (12.73 sq mi)
- Elevation: 410 m (1,350 ft)

Population (2016-12-31)
  - Total: 2,997
  - Density: 90.90/km^{2} (235.4/sq mi)
- Time zone: UTC+01:00 (CET)
  - Summer (DST): UTC+02:00 (CEST)
- Postal codes: 98553
- Dialling codes: 036841, 036878
- Vehicle registration: HBN
- Website: www.nahetal-waldau.de

Nahetal-Waldau is a former municipality in the district of Hildburghausen, in Thuringia, Germany. Since July 2018, it is part of the town of Schleusingen.

== Geography ==
=== Geographical Location ===
The municipality of Nahetal-Waldau was located in the Thuringian Forest. The districts of Waldau and Oberrod are located in the valley of the lock, and the hamlets of Schleusingerneundorf and Hinternah are located in the Nahe Valley.

=== Community ===
The districts in the municipality were:

- Hinternah
- Oberrod
- Schleusingerneundorf
- Silbach
- Waldau
