= Brünn, Thuringia =

Brünn/Thür.
- Municipality
- Coat of arms

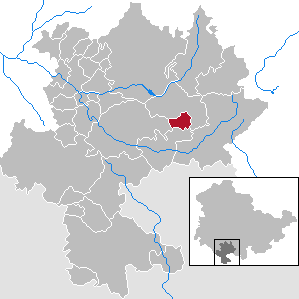
- Location of Brünn/Thür. within Hildburghausen district
- Interactive map of Brünn/Thür.
- Location within Germany Location within Thuringia
- Coordinates: 50°27′N 10°50′E
- Country: Germany
- State: Thuringia
- District: Hildburghausen

Government
  - Mayor (2021–27): Andreas Brandt

Area
  - Total: 6.1 km^{2} (2.4 sq mi)
- Elevation: 420 m (1,380 ft)

Population (2025-12-31)
  - Total: 394
  - Density: 65/km^{2} (170/sq mi)
- Time zone: UTC+01:00 (CET)
  - Summer (DST): UTC+02:00 (CEST)
- Postal codes: 98673
- Dialling codes: 036878
- Vehicle registration: HBN

Brünn/Thür. (German pronunciation: [bʁʏn]) is a municipality in the district of Hildburghausen, in Thuringia, Germany.
