= Beinerstadt =

- Municipality
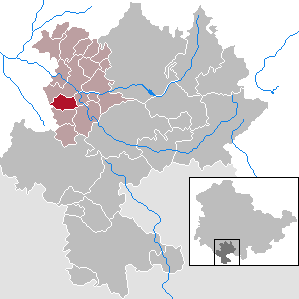
- Location of Beinerstadt within Hildburghausen district
- Interactive map of Beinerstadt
- Location within Germany Location within Thuringia
- Coordinates: 50°28′N 10°35′E
- Country: Germany
- State: Thuringia
- District: Hildburghausen
- Municipal assoc.: Feldstein

Government
  - Mayor (2022–28): Christian Vogler

Area
  - Total: 6.71 km^{2} (2.59 sq mi)
- Elevation: 430 m (1,410 ft)

Population (2025-12-31)
  - Total: 283
  - Density: 42.2/km^{2} (109/sq mi)
- Time zone: UTC+01:00 (CET)
  - Summer (DST): UTC+02:00 (CEST)
- Postal codes: 98660
- Dialling codes: 036873
- Vehicle registration: HBN

Beinerstadt is a municipality in the district of Hildburghausen, in Thuringia, Germany.
