= Friedrich Wilhelm Adami =

German writer (1816–1893)

Friedrich Wilhelm Adami (18 October 1816 – 5 August 1893) was a German author, critic, and publicist. He was born at Suhl, Thuringia, Germany, studied medicine, then philosophy and history, in Berlin. He was a regular theater critic and columnist for the Neue Preussische Zeitung newspaper, as well as doing translations. Among his most renowned original works are Ein ehrlicher Mann (1850) and Der Doppelgänger (1870). Among his collections of historical tales are Fürstenund Volksbilder aus der vaterländischen Geschichte (1863) and Aus den Tagen zweier Könige (two volumes, 1866). His works are known for his clear writing style and a thoroughly patriotic tone.

== Life ==
Adami was the son of a surgeon, Christian Gottlieb Adami, and his wife Regina Dorothea. At his father's behest, he began studying medicine in 1835, in Berlin, but soon switched to philosophy and history. On 28 September 1841, Adami married the actress Auguste Pohl in Berlin.

In 1836, he starting working as a freelance employee for the Berliner Figaro for the publisher Ernst Litfaß. In 1839, he founded Sonnenblumen (the "Sunflower"), which was an annual almanac of historical and modern novels. He stopped publishing it after ten years due to the revolutions of 1848 in the German states. He then became a critic and columnist for the Neuen Preußischen Zeitung newspaper in 1849.

Adami was considered a conservative and he was, in his time, a successful writer. For many of his publications, he used the pen name Paul Fronberg.

== Selected works ==
- Dramatische Genrebilder aus der vaterländischen Geschichte (Dramatic genre painting from the country's history). Berlin, 1870 (2 volumes).
- Große und kleine Welt. Selected historical novels. Berlin, 1870 (4 volumes).
- Luise, Königin von Preußen. Biography. Berlin, 1882.
- Vor fünfzig Jahren. Nach den Aufzeichnungen von Augenzeugen. (Fifty Years Ago - According to the records of eyewitnesses) Berlin, 1863.
- Aus Friedrichs des Großen Zeit. (From the time of Frederick the Great) Berlin, 1869.

== Literature ==
- Emil Dovifat (1953). "Adami, Friedrich Wilhelm". Neue Deutsche Biographie (in German). Vol. 1. Berlin: Duncker & Humblot. p. 56. (full text online).
- Eduard Vollmer: Berliner Theaterkritiker. Eine Kritik der Kritik. (Berlin Theatre Critic – A critique of the critique) Gerstmann, Berlin, 1884.
- Karl Friedrich Ludwig Goedeke: Grundriß zur Geschichte der deutschen Dichtung/N.F., Bd. 1. (Outline of the history of German literature) Verlag Ehlermann, Berlin, 1940, P. 120–133.
