= Themar =

- Town
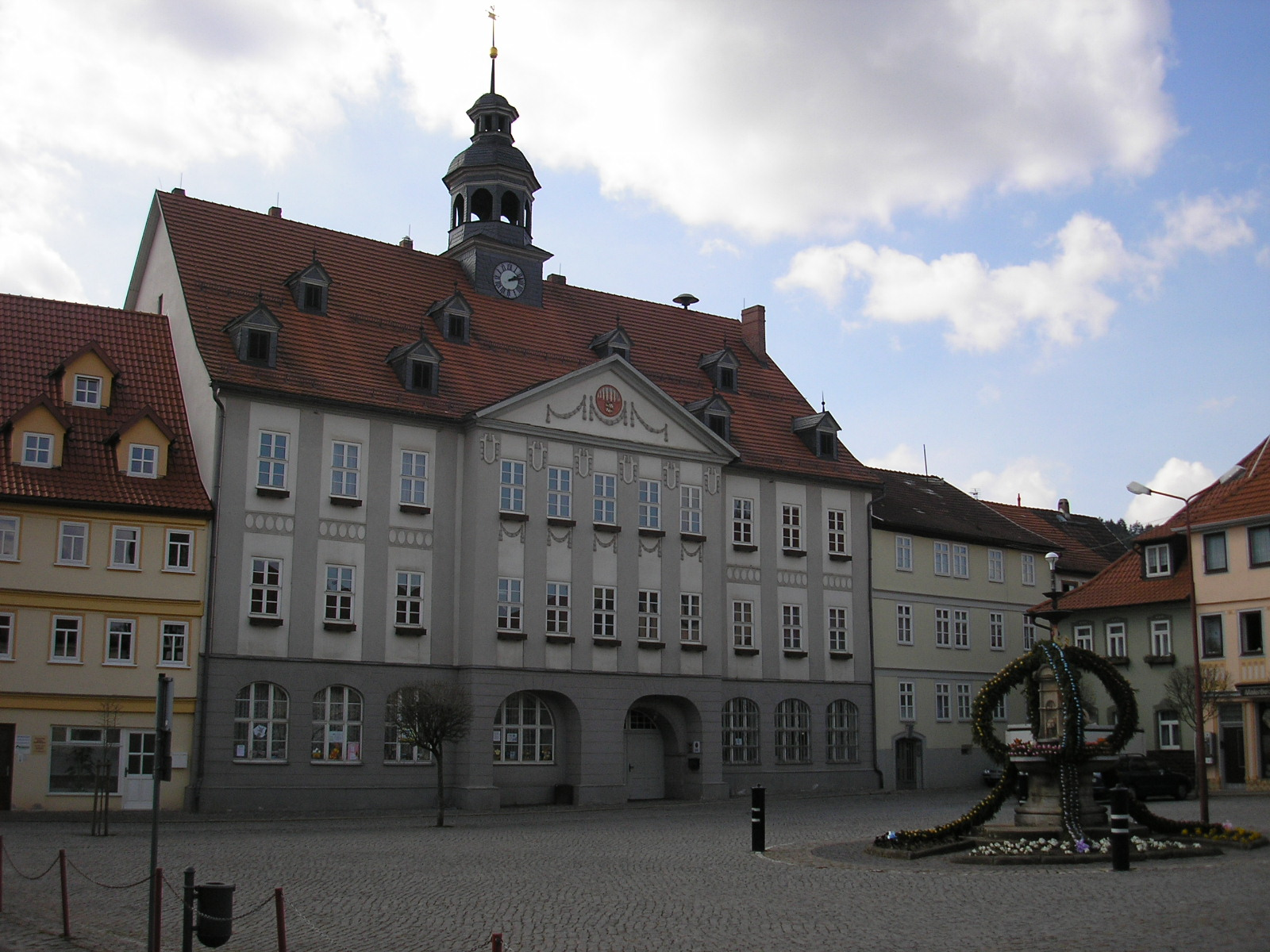
- Town hall

- Coat of arms

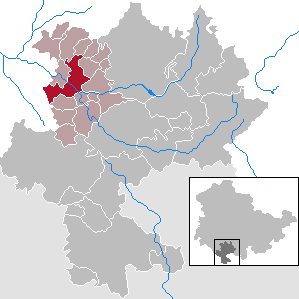
- Location of Themar within Hildburghausen district
- Interactive map of Themar
- Location within Germany Location within Thuringia
- Coordinates: 50°30′15″N 10°36′57″E
- Country: Germany
- State: Thuringia
- District: Hildburghausen
- Municipal assoc.: Feldstein
- Subdivisions: 3

Government
  - Mayor (2019–25): Peter Harenberg

Area
  - Total: 20.18 km^{2} (7.79 sq mi)
- Elevation: 330 m (1,080 ft)

Population (2025-12-31)
  - Total: 2,664
  - Density: 132.0/km^{2} (341.9/sq mi)
- Time zone: UTC+01:00 (CET)
  - Summer (DST): UTC+02:00 (CEST)
- Postal codes: 98660
- Dialling codes: 036873
- Vehicle registration: HBN
- Website: www.themar.de

Themar (German: [ˈteːmaʁ]) is a town in the district of Hildburghausen, in Thuringia, Germany. It is situated on the river Werra, 11 km northwest of Hildburghausen, and 14 km southwest of Suhl.

== Main sights ==
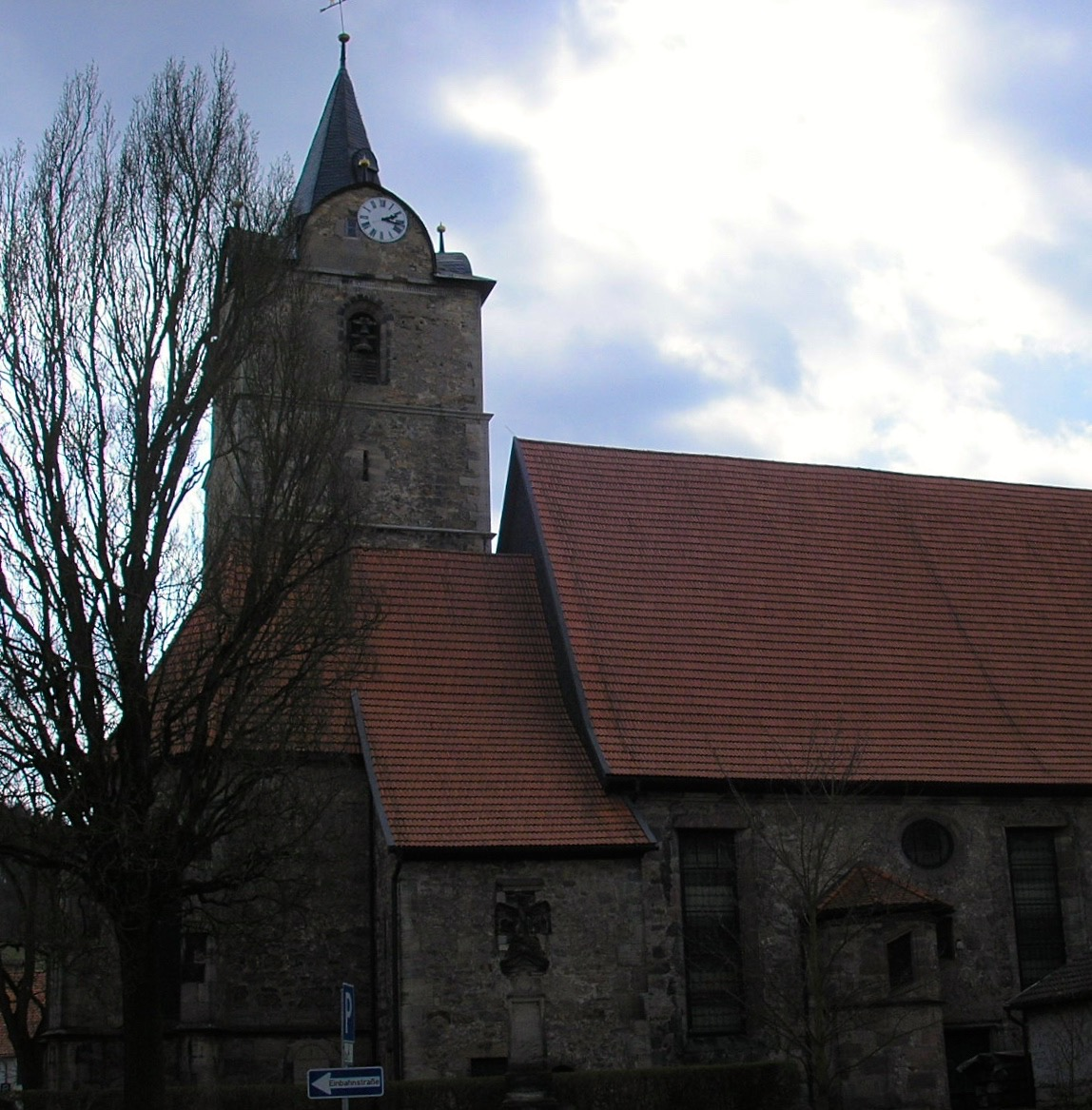
St. Bartholomew's Church

- St. Bartholomew's Church, Themar
- St. John's Church
- Defensive wall
- Town hall
- Market place

== Notable people ==
- Karl Blau (1930–1994), politician and official of the NDPD

== Literature and film ==
- Themar – Stadt der 7 Türme, Documentary (2010), Directed by: Robert Sauerbrey
- 1200 Jahre Themar: Festschrift zur 1200-Jahrfeier der Stadt Themar (in German), Börner PR, 1996, ISBN 978-3-930675-08-1
