= Feldstein (Verwaltungsgemeinschaft) =

- Verwaltungsgemeinschaft
- Map of Hildburghausen highlighting Feldstein
- Interactive map of Feldstein
- Location within Germany Location within Thuringia
- Coordinates: 50°30′N 10°37′E
- Country: Germany
- State: Thuringia
- District: Hildburghausen
- Seat: Themar
- Subdivisions: 17 municipalities

Area
  - Total: 146.17 km^{2} (56.44 sq mi)

Population (2025-12-31)
  - Total: 6,976
  - Density: 47.73/km^{2} (123.6/sq mi)
- Time zone: UTC+01:00 (CET)
  - Summer (DST): UTC+02:00 (CEST)
- Website: www.verwaltungsgemeinschaft-feldstein.de

Feldstein is a Verwaltungsgemeinschaft ("collective municipality") in the district of Hildburghausen, in Thuringia, Germany. The seat of the Verwaltungsgemeinschaft is in Themar.

The Verwaltungsgemeinschaft Feldstein consists of the following municipalities:

1. Ahlstädt
2. Beinerstadt
3. Bischofrod
4. Dingsleben
5. Ehrenberg
6. Eichenberg
7. Grimmelshausen
8. Grub
9. Henfstädt
10. Kloster Veßra
11. Lengfeld
12. Marisfeld
13. Oberstadt
14. Reurieth
15. Sankt Bernhard
16. Schmeheim
17. Themar
