= Marisfeld =

- Municipality
- Coat of arms

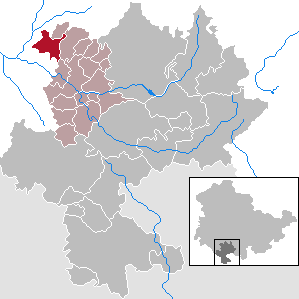
- Location of Marisfeld within Hildburghausen district
- Interactive map of Marisfeld
- Location within Germany Location within Thuringia
- Coordinates: 50°32′N 10°34′E
- Country: Germany
- State: Thuringia
- District: Hildburghausen
- Municipal assoc.: Feldstein

Government
  - Mayor (2022–28): Sandra Altendorf

Area
  - Total: 11.51 km^{2} (4.44 sq mi)
- Elevation: 380 m (1,250 ft)

Population (2025-12-31)
  - Total: 401
  - Density: 34.8/km^{2} (90.2/sq mi)
- Time zone: UTC+01:00 (CET)
  - Summer (DST): UTC+02:00 (CEST)
- Postal codes: 98530
- Dialling codes: 036846
- Vehicle registration: HBN

Marisfeld is a municipality in the district of Hildburghausen, in Thuringia, Germany.
