= Dingsleben =

- Municipality
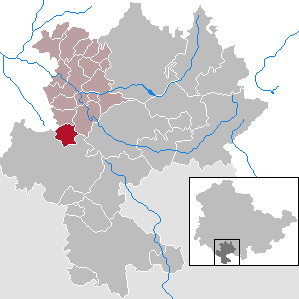
- Location of Dingsleben within Hildburghausen district
- Interactive map of Dingsleben
- Location within Germany Location within Thuringia
- Coordinates: 50°25′N 10°35′E
- Country: Germany
- State: Thuringia
- District: Hildburghausen
- Municipal assoc.: Feldstein

Government
  - Mayor (2022–28): Steffi Hartleb

Area
  - Total: 8.44 km^{2} (3.26 sq mi)
- Elevation: 435 m (1,427 ft)

Population (2025-12-31)
  - Total: 230
  - Density: 27/km^{2} (71/sq mi)
- Time zone: UTC+01:00 (CET)
  - Summer (DST): UTC+02:00 (CEST)
- Postal codes: 98646
- Dialling codes: 036873
- Vehicle registration: HBN

Dingsleben is a municipality in the district of Hildburghausen, in Thuringia, Germany.
