= Reurieth =

- Municipality
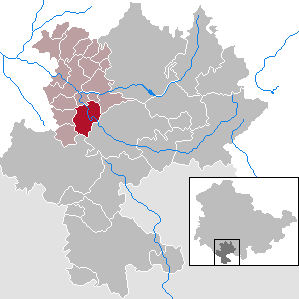
- Location of Reurieth within Hildburghausen district
- Interactive map of Reurieth
- Location within Germany Location within Thuringia
- Coordinates: 50°27′N 10°39′E
- Country: Germany
- State: Thuringia
- District: Hildburghausen
- Municipal assoc.: Feldstein

Government
  - Mayor (2022–28): Annette Häfner

Area
  - Total: 16.22 km^{2} (6.26 sq mi)
- Elevation: 350 m (1,150 ft)

Population (2025-12-31)
  - Total: 741
  - Density: 45.7/km^{2} (118/sq mi)
- Time zone: UTC+01:00 (CET)
  - Summer (DST): UTC+02:00 (CEST)
- Postal codes: 98646
- Dialling codes: 03685
- Vehicle registration: HBN

Reurieth is a municipality in the district of Hildburghausen, in Thuringia, Germany.

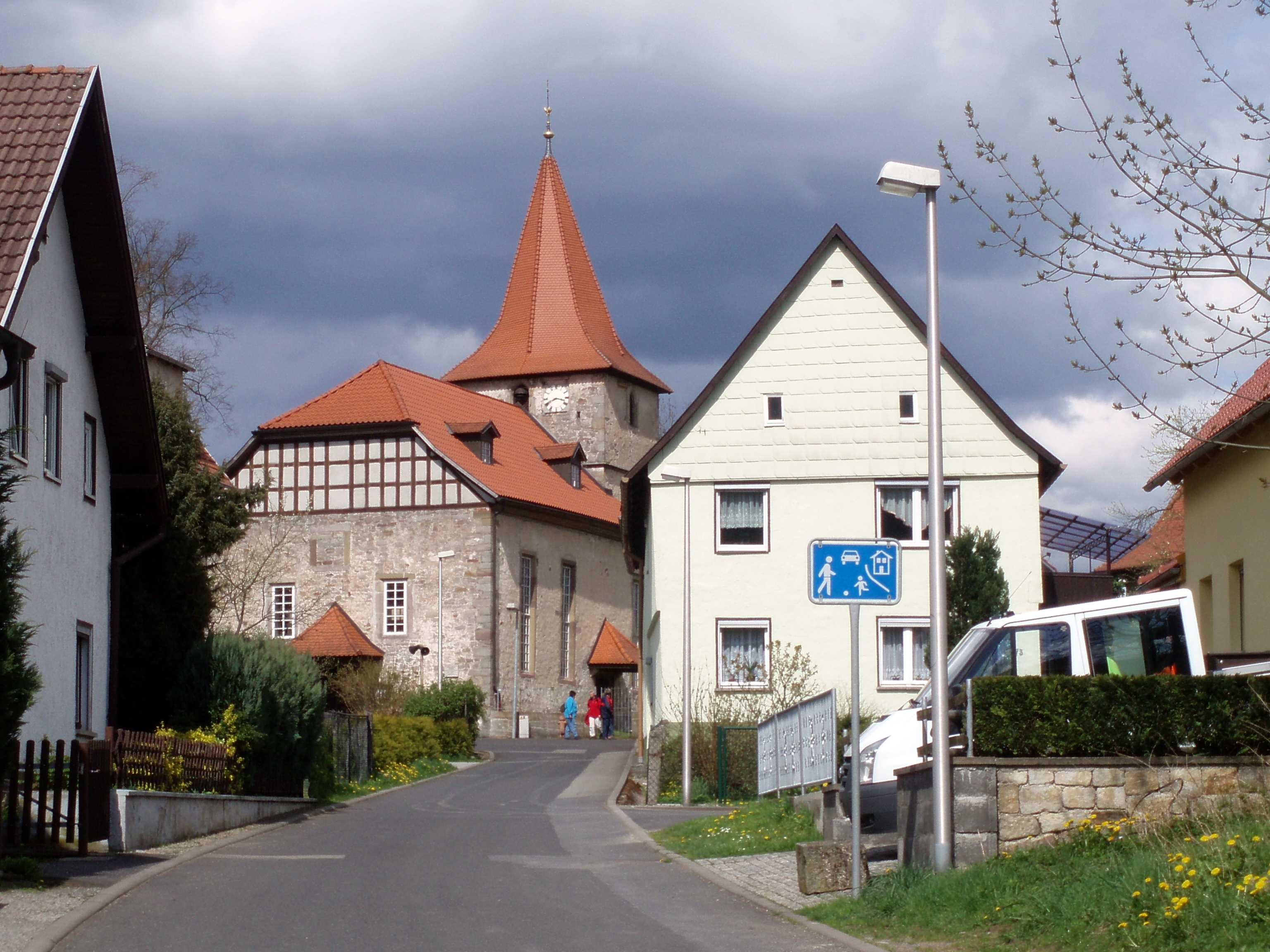
Reurieth
