= Henfstädt =

- Municipality
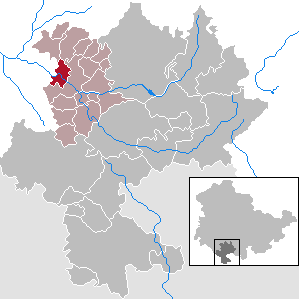
- Location of Henfstädt within Hildburghausen district
- Interactive map of Henfstädt
- Location within Germany Location within Thuringia
- Coordinates: 50°31′N 10°35′E
- Country: Germany
- State: Thuringia
- District: Hildburghausen
- Municipal assoc.: Feldstein

Government
  - Mayor (2022–28): Simone Langner-Schneider

Area
  - Total: 8.10 km^{2} (3.13 sq mi)
- Elevation: 330 m (1,080 ft)

Population (2025-12-31)
  - Total: 304
  - Density: 37.5/km^{2} (97.2/sq mi)
- Time zone: UTC+01:00 (CET)
  - Summer (DST): UTC+02:00 (CEST)
- Postal codes: 98660
- Dialling codes: 036873
- Vehicle registration: HBN
- Website: www.henfstaedt.de

Henfstädt is a municipality in the district of Hildburghausen, in Thuringia, Germany.
