= Ehrenberg, Thuringia =

Ehrenberg
- Municipality
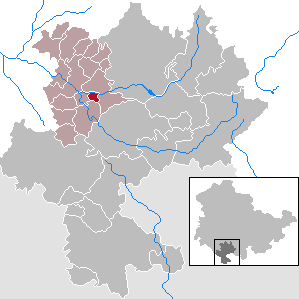
- Location of Ehrenberg within Hildburghausen district
- Interactive map of Ehrenberg
- Location within Germany Location within Thuringia
- Coordinates: 50°28′N 10°39′E
- Country: Germany
- State: Thuringia
- District: Hildburghausen
- Municipal assoc.: Feldstein

Government
  - Mayor (2022–28): Heiko Schönhuber

Area
  - Total: 2.08 km^{2} (0.80 sq mi)
- Elevation: 429 m (1,407 ft)

Population (2025-12-31)
  - Total: 185
  - Density: 88.9/km^{2} (230/sq mi)
- Time zone: UTC+01:00 (CET)
  - Summer (DST): UTC+02:00 (CEST)
- Postal codes: 98660
- Dialling codes: 036873
- Vehicle registration: HBN

Ehrenberg (German pronunciation: [ˈeːʁənbɛʁk]) is a municipality in the district of Hildburghausen, in Thuringia, Germany.
