= Sankt Bernhard, Thuringia =

Sankt Bernhard
- Municipality
- Coat of arms

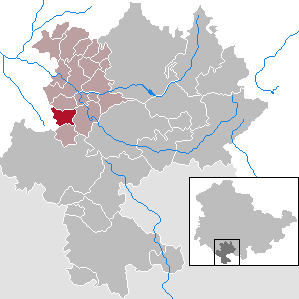
- Location of Sankt Bernhard within Hildburghausen district
- Interactive map of Sankt Bernhard
- Location within Germany Location within Thuringia
- Coordinates: 50°28′N 10°36′E
- Country: Germany
- State: Thuringia
- District: Hildburghausen
- Municipal assoc.: Feldstein

Government
  - Mayor (2022–28): Dieter Leffler

Area
  - Total: 7.36 km^{2} (2.84 sq mi)
- Elevation: 480 m (1,570 ft)

Population (2025-12-31)
  - Total: 232
  - Density: 31.5/km^{2} (81.6/sq mi)
- Time zone: UTC+01:00 (CET)
  - Summer (DST): UTC+02:00 (CEST)
- Postal codes: 98660
- Dialling codes: 036873
- Vehicle registration: HBN

Sankt Bernhard is a municipality in the district of Hildburghausen, in Thuringia, Germany. It has a population of 251 (Dec. 2020).
