= Bischofrod =

- Municipality
- Coat of arms

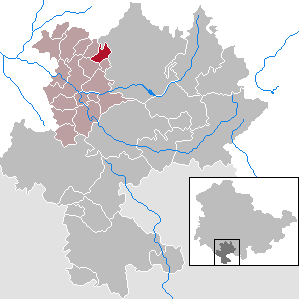
- Location of Bischofrod within Hildburghausen district
- Interactive map of Bischofrod
- Location within Germany Location within Thuringia
- Coordinates: 50°32′N 10°39′E
- Country: Germany
- State: Thuringia
- District: Hildburghausen
- Municipal assoc.: Feldstein

Government
  - Mayor (2020–26): Tobias Jäger

Area
  - Total: 5.42 km^{2} (2.09 sq mi)
- Elevation: 390 m (1,280 ft)

Population (2025-12-31)
  - Total: 157
  - Density: 29.0/km^{2} (75.0/sq mi)
- Time zone: UTC+01:00 (CET)
  - Summer (DST): UTC+02:00 (CEST)
- Postal codes: 98553
- Dialling codes: 036873
- Vehicle registration: HBN

Bischofrod is a municipality in the district of Hildburghausen, in Thuringia, Germany.
