= Ahlstädt =

- Municipality
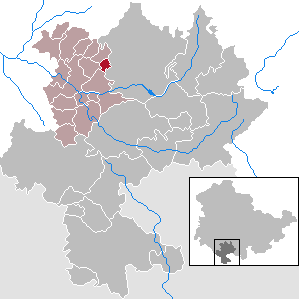
- Location of Ahlstädt within Hildburghausen district
- Interactive map of Ahlstädt
- Location within Germany Location within Thuringia
- Coordinates: 50°32′N 10°41′E
- Country: Germany
- State: Thuringia
- District: Hildburghausen
- Municipal assoc.: Feldstein

Government
  - Mayor (2022–28): Jens Greiner

Area
  - Total: 2.32 km^{2} (0.90 sq mi)
- Elevation: 460 m (1,510 ft)

Population (2025-12-31)
  - Total: 126
  - Density: 54.3/km^{2} (141/sq mi)
- Time zone: UTC+01:00 (CET)
  - Summer (DST): UTC+02:00 (CEST)
- Postal codes: 98553
- Dialling codes: 036873
- Vehicle registration: HBN

Ahlstädt is a municipality in the district of Hildburghausen, in Thuringia, Germany.
