= Oberstadt =

- Municipality
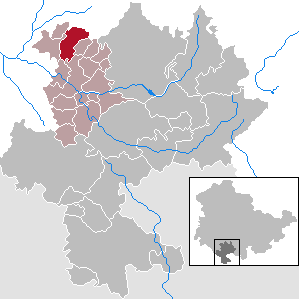
- Location of Oberstadt within Hildburghausen district
- Interactive map of Oberstadt
- Location within Germany Location within Thuringia
- Coordinates: 50°32′N 10°35′E
- Country: Germany
- State: Thuringia
- District: Hildburghausen
- Municipal assoc.: Feldstein

Government
  - Mayor (2022–28): Andreas Oertel

Area
  - Total: 13.41 km^{2} (5.18 sq mi)
- Elevation: 430 m (1,410 ft)

Population (2025-12-31)
  - Total: 318
  - Density: 23.7/km^{2} (61.4/sq mi)
- Time zone: UTC+01:00 (CET)
  - Summer (DST): UTC+02:00 (CEST)
- Postal codes: 98530
- Dialling codes: 036846
- Vehicle registration: HBN

Oberstadt is a municipality in the district of Hildburghausen, in Thuringia, Germany.
