= Grimmelshausen =

- Municipality
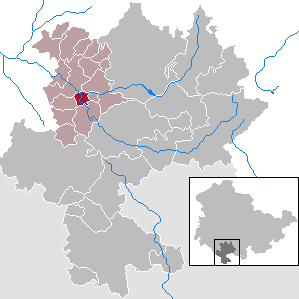
- Location of Grimmelshausen within Hildburghausen district
- Interactive map of Grimmelshausen
- Location within Germany Location within Thuringia
- Coordinates: 50°29′N 10°38′E
- Country: Germany
- State: Thuringia
- District: Hildburghausen
- Municipal assoc.: Feldstein

Government
  - Mayor (2022–28): Bodo Dressel

Area
  - Total: 4.21 km^{2} (1.63 sq mi)
- Elevation: 360 m (1,180 ft)

Population (2025-12-31)
  - Total: 163
  - Density: 38.7/km^{2} (100/sq mi)
- Time zone: UTC+01:00 (CET)
  - Summer (DST): UTC+02:00 (CEST)
- Postal codes: 98660
- Dialling codes: 036873
- Vehicle registration: HBN
- Website: www.vg-feldstein.de

Grimmelshausen is a municipality in the district of Hildburghausen, in Thuringia, Germany.
