= Schmeheim =

- Municipality
- Coat of arms

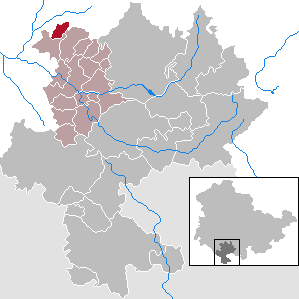
- Location of Schmeheim within Hildburghausen district
- Interactive map of Schmeheim
- Location within Germany Location within Thuringia
- Coordinates: 50°34′N 10°34′E
- Country: Germany
- State: Thuringia
- District: Hildburghausen
- Municipal assoc.: Feldstein

Government
  - Mayor (2022–28): Frank Werner

Area
  - Total: 4.73 km^{2} (1.83 sq mi)
- Elevation: 420 m (1,380 ft)

Population (2025-12-31)
  - Total: 252
  - Density: 53.3/km^{2} (138/sq mi)
- Time zone: UTC+01:00 (CET)
  - Summer (DST): UTC+02:00 (CEST)
- Postal codes: 98530
- Dialling codes: 036846
- Vehicle registration: HBN
- Website: www.schmeheim.de

Schmeheim is a municipality in the district of Hildburghausen, in Thuringia, Germany.
