= Eichenberg, Hildburghausen =

Eichenberg
- Municipality
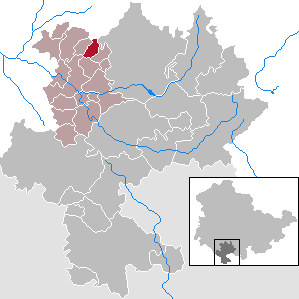
- Location of Eichenberg within Hildburghausen district
- Interactive map of Eichenberg
- Location within Germany Location within Thuringia
- Coordinates: 50°32′43″N 10°39′33″E
- Country: Germany
- State: Thuringia
- District: Hildburghausen
- Municipal assoc.: Feldstein
- Subdivisions: 2

Government
  - Mayor (2019–25): Lutz Röhrig

Area
  - Total: 4.5 km^{2} (1.7 sq mi)
- Elevation: 420 m (1,380 ft)

Population (2025-12-31)
  - Total: 153
  - Density: 34/km^{2} (88/sq mi)
- Time zone: UTC+01:00 (CET)
  - Summer (DST): UTC+02:00 (CEST)
- Postal codes: 98553
- Dialling codes: 036873
- Vehicle registration: HBN

Eichenberg (German pronunciation: [ˈaɪçn̩bɛʁk]) is a municipality in the district of Hildburghausen, in Thuringia, Germany.
