= Grub, Thuringia =

Grub
- Municipality
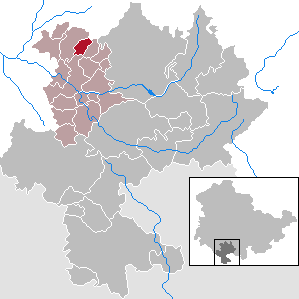
- Location of Grub within Hildburghausen district
- Interactive map of Grub
- Location within Germany Location within Thuringia
- Coordinates: 50°33′N 10°38′E
- Country: Germany
- State: Thuringia
- District: Hildburghausen
- Municipal assoc.: Feldstein

Government
  - Mayor (2022–28): Uwe Triebel

Area
  - Total: 4.49 km^{2} (1.73 sq mi)
- Elevation: 460 m (1,510 ft)

Population (2025-12-31)
  - Total: 147
  - Density: 32.7/km^{2} (84.8/sq mi)
- Time zone: UTC+01:00 (CET)
  - Summer (DST): UTC+02:00 (CEST)
- Postal codes: 98530
- Dialling codes: 036846
- Vehicle registration: HBN
- Website: www.vg-feldstein.de

Grub is a municipality in the district of Hildburghausen, in Thuringia, Germany.
