= Hildburghausen (district) =

Coordinates: 50°25′N 10°45′E

- District
- Flag Coat of arms
- Country: Germany
- State: Thuringia
- Capital: Hildburghausen

Government
  - District admin.: Sven Gregor (Free Voters)

Area
  - Total: 938.42 km^{2} (362.33 sq mi)

Population (31 December 2024)
  - Total: 59,987
  - Density: 63.923/km^{2} (165.56/sq mi)
- Time zone: UTC+01:00 (CET)
  - Summer (DST): UTC+02:00 (CEST)
- Vehicle registration: HBN
- Website: www.landkreis-hildburghausen.de

Hildburghausen is a district in Thuringia, Germany. It is bounded by (from the west and clockwise) the district of Schmalkalden-Meiningen, the city of Suhl, the districts of Ilm-Kreis, Saalfeld-Rudolstadt and Sonneberg, and the state of Bavaria (districts of Coburg, Haßberge and Rhön-Grabfeld). Located roughly halfway between the mountain chains of the Rhön and the Thuringian Forest, the district is densely forested and covered by hilly countryside. Its territory is similar to that of the former Ernestine duchy, Saxe-Hildburghausen.

== Towns and municipalities ==
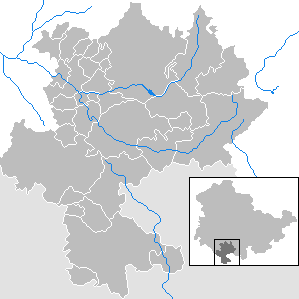
Clickable map of towns and municipalities in the district

Verwaltungsgemeinschaft (community of administration): free towns and municipalities
1. Eisfeld
2. Hildburghausen
3. Römhild
4. Schleusingen
1. Auengrund
2. Brünn
3. Masserberg
4. Schleusegrund
5. Veilsdorf

Verwaltungsgemeinschaften (community of administration)
1. Feldstein; 1. Ahlstädt; 2. Beinerstadt; 3. Bischofrod; 4. Dingsleben; 5. Ehrenberg; 6. Eichenberg; 7. Grimmelshausen; 8. Grub; 9. Henfstädt; 10. Kloster Veßra; 11. Lengfeld; 12. Marisfeld; 13. Oberstadt; 14. Reurieth; 15. Sankt Bernhard; 16. Schmeheim; 17. Themar^{1, 2}	2. Heldburger Unterland; 1. Heldburg^{1, 2}; 2. Schlechtsart; 3. Schweickershausen; 4. Straufhain; 5. Ummerstadt^{2}; 6. Westhausen
^{1}seat of the Verwaltungsgemeinschaft;^{2}town

== Coat of arms ==
The coat of arms displays:

- the heraldic lion of Meißen, the precursor state to Saxony
- the cock representing the counts of Henneberg, who ruled the region until 1583
- below the symbol of the bishopric of Würzburg is displayed
