= Thuringian Forest =

Mountain range in the German state of Thuringia

- Thüringer Wald
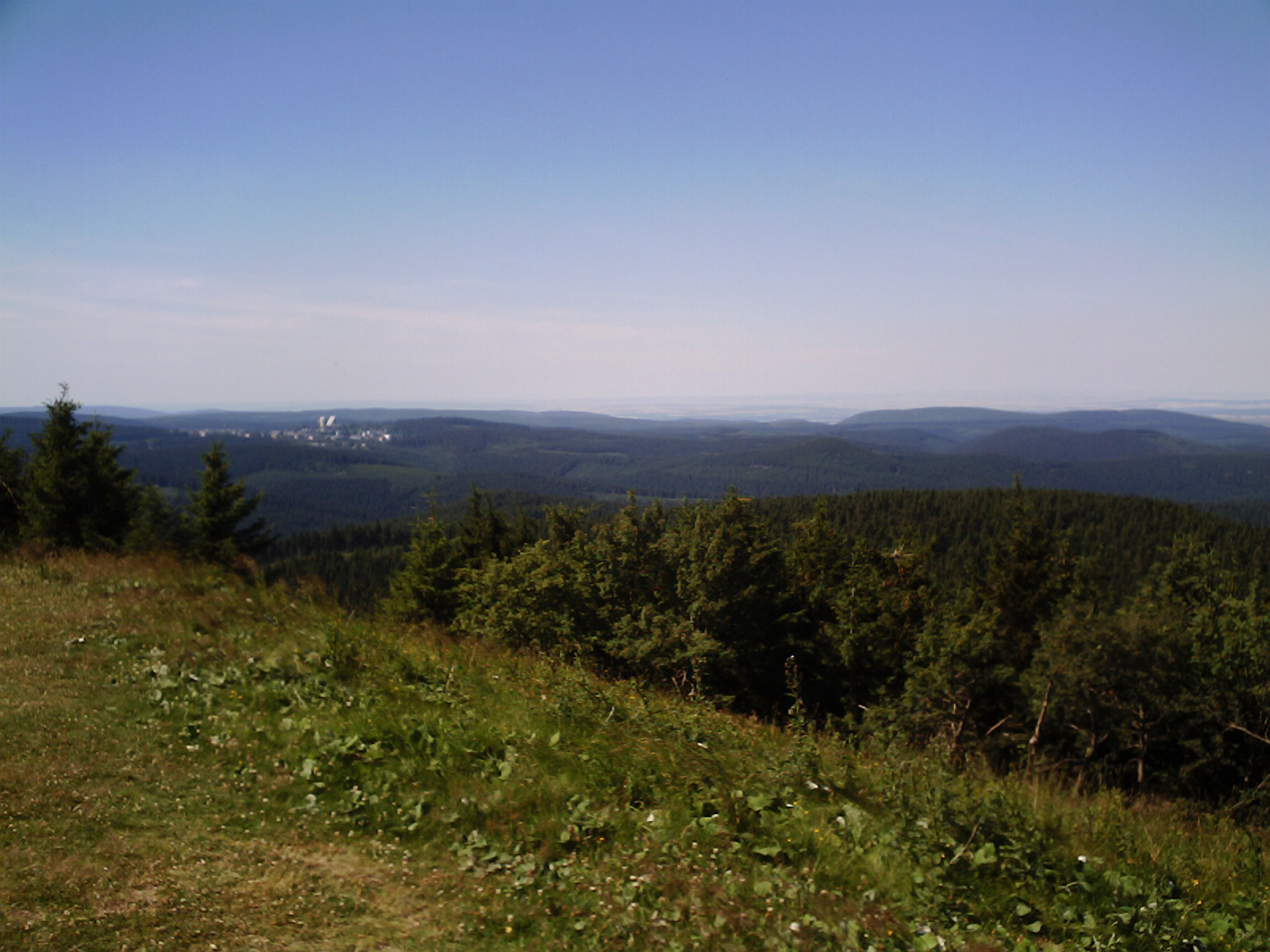
- View from Schneekopf towards Oberhof

Highest point
- Peak: Großer Beerberg
- Elevation: 983 m (3,225 ft)
- Coordinates: 50°39′34″N 10°44′42″E

Geography
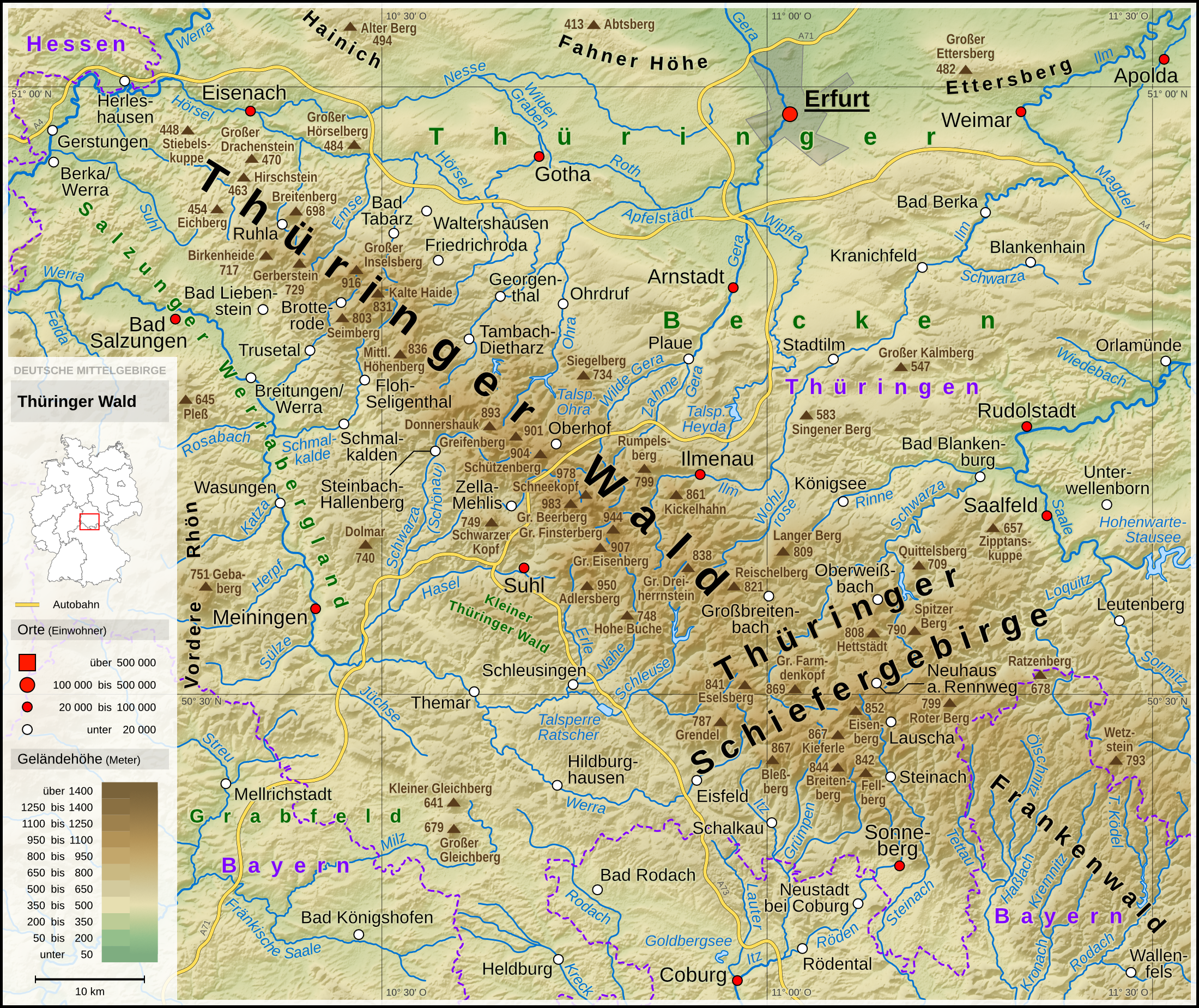
- Country: Germany
- Region: Thuringia
- Range coordinates: 50°40′N 10°45′E

Geology
- Orogenies: Variscan, Saxonian
- Rock age: Paleozoic
- Rock type(s): sedimentary, metamorphic, magmatic

The Thuringian Forest (Thüringer Wald in German pronounced [ˈtyːʁɪŋɐ ˈvalt]) is a mountain range in the southern parts of the German state of Thuringia, running northwest to southeast. Skirting from its southerly source in foothills to a gorge on its north-west side is the Werra valley. On the other side of the Forest is an upper outcrop of the North German Plain, the Thuringian Basin, which includes the city of Erfurt. The south and south-east continuation of the range is the highland often called the Thuringian-Vogtlandian Slate Mountains. (Note: The geological divisor runs from Gehren via Großbreitenbach to Schönbrunn, defined by the rivers Schleuse and Neubrunn on the southwestern slope, and Talwasser, Wohlrose and Möhre on the northeastern slope.)

Among scattered foothills at its northern foot are the towns Eisenach, Gotha and Arnstadt. The towns of Ilmenau and Suhl sit in slight dips on the range itself to the north and south respectively.

== Geography and communications ==
The Thuringian Forest forms a continuous chain of ancient rounded mountains with steep slopes to both sides and poses ample difficulties in transit routing save through a few navigable passes. It is about 70 km (43 mi) long and 20 km (12 mi) wide. The highest elevation is Großer Beerberg at 982 m (3,222 ft) above sea level.

The Rennsteig (sometimes called Rennweg) is an ancient path following the main ridge and connecting the summits. It is now a famous hiking path and marks the traditional boundary between the hills-dominated terrain of central Germany and the more rugged terrain characteristic of southern Germany, and also the boundary between the cultural regions of central and north Thuringia and Franconia. Dialects and traditional customs and costumes are different on either side of the Rennsteig. The Rennsteig is the subject of the song Rennsteiglied (de), the unofficial hymn of Thuringia.

Motorway A 4 passes north of the Thuringian Forest, while A 71, intersecting the former south of Erfurt, crosses the range from the northeast to the southwest, passes under the ridge in the Rennsteig Tunnel near Oberhof, and is joined near Suhl by A 73. Two more long-distance roads, Bundesstraßen 19 and 84, pass over the western parts of the range, while Bundesstraße 88 skirts the northern foothills between Eisenach and Geraberg.

The Neudietendorf–Ritschenhausen railway crosses the Thuringian Forest in Brandleite Tunnel between Gehlberg and Oberhof, the Werra Railway between Eisenach and Eisfeld does so in a tunnel near Förtha. Both are in daily operation. A third line, the southern section of the Plaue–Themar railway, does not use a tunnel, but crosses the mountain ridge at Rennsteig switchback station. It has only been used by museum trains since 1998. The Nuremberg–Erfurt high-speed railway crosses the Thuringian Forest with the help of several tunnels and bridges.

Thüringerwaldbahn, a cross-country line of the Gotha tramway network, serves the northern foothills of the Thuringian Forest between Gotha and Bad Tabarz, including a branch to Waltershausen.

== Geology ==
=== Overview ===
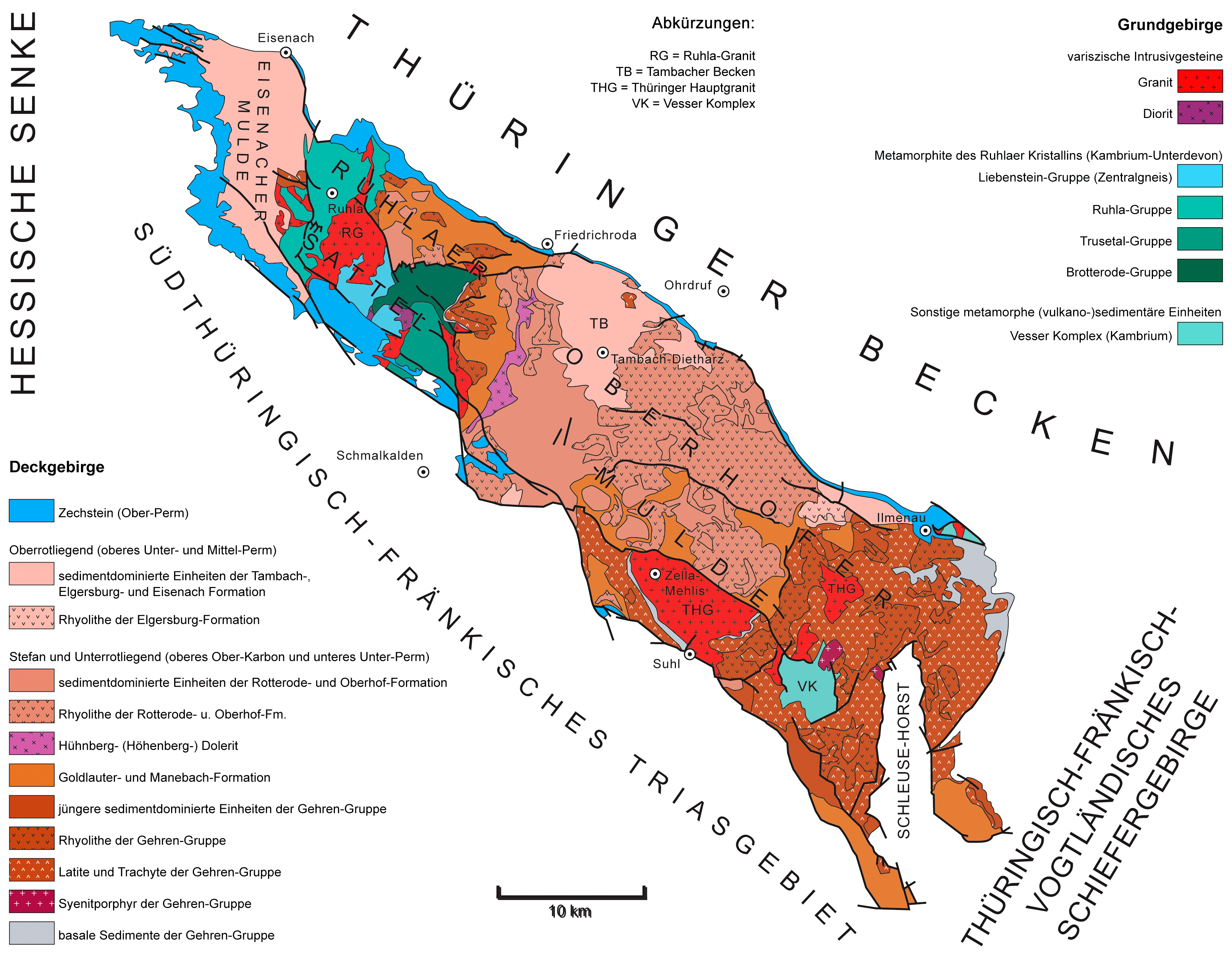
Geological map of Thuringian Forest

Geologically, the Thuringian Forest is defined by a belt of strongly uplifted and deformed metamorphic and igneous rock that divides the relatively flat sedimentary plains of the Thüringer Becken (to the northeast) from similar rock formations in the valley of the Werra (to the southwest). It consists of a large fault block in hercynian orientation, which consists from sandstones and conglomerates of Rotliegend age in its western parts (Eisenach trough), followed by granites and gneisses of the Ruhlaer Kristallin formation of early paleozoic origin which were uplifted in the Rotliegend era, and the conglomerates, sandstones, and abundant volcanic rocks (rhyolites and andesites) of the Oberhof trough. Ore deposits associated with the upthrust of the range have been of significant historical importance in the development of the region, for example, the metalworking tradition in Suhl and the mining history of Ilmenau.

The uplift of the horst-like fault block was part of the Saxonian tectonic processes and is understood as a long range effect of the Alpine orogeny. It began in the upper Cretaceous era and ended in the late Tertiary after about 40 million years.

Thuringian forest is surrounded on three sides by triassic rocks: the Thuringian Basin in the northeast, the Hesse Highlands in the west, and the northeastern parts of the South German Scarplands in the south, and by the Variscan rocks of the Thuringian Highland towards the east. The geological borders differ from the geographical ones insofar, as the Rotliegend rock of the Thuringian forest finds its continuation in the Masserberg and Crock block in Hildburghausen district, southeast of the main range, and the rock types of the Thuringian Highland are also found in the Schleuse horst between Schönbrunn reservoir and Schönau, and in the Vesser complex near Schmiedefeld, an island of Variscan rocks embedded in Rotliegend. While the near-surface rocks of the Thuringian Highland comprise mostly the folded Variscan basement, the oldest unfolded overlying strata (dating from the Permosilesian age) of this basement are exposed in the Thuringian forest. Common to both ranges, but also to other low mountain ranges in Central Europe uplifted at the same time, are the bordering Zechstein deposits which contain Bryozoa reefs. These stretch especially wide on the northwestern edge of the Thuringian forest, where the landscape park of Altenstein Palace is located on one of the largest Zechstein reefs in Germany.

=== Eisenach trough ===
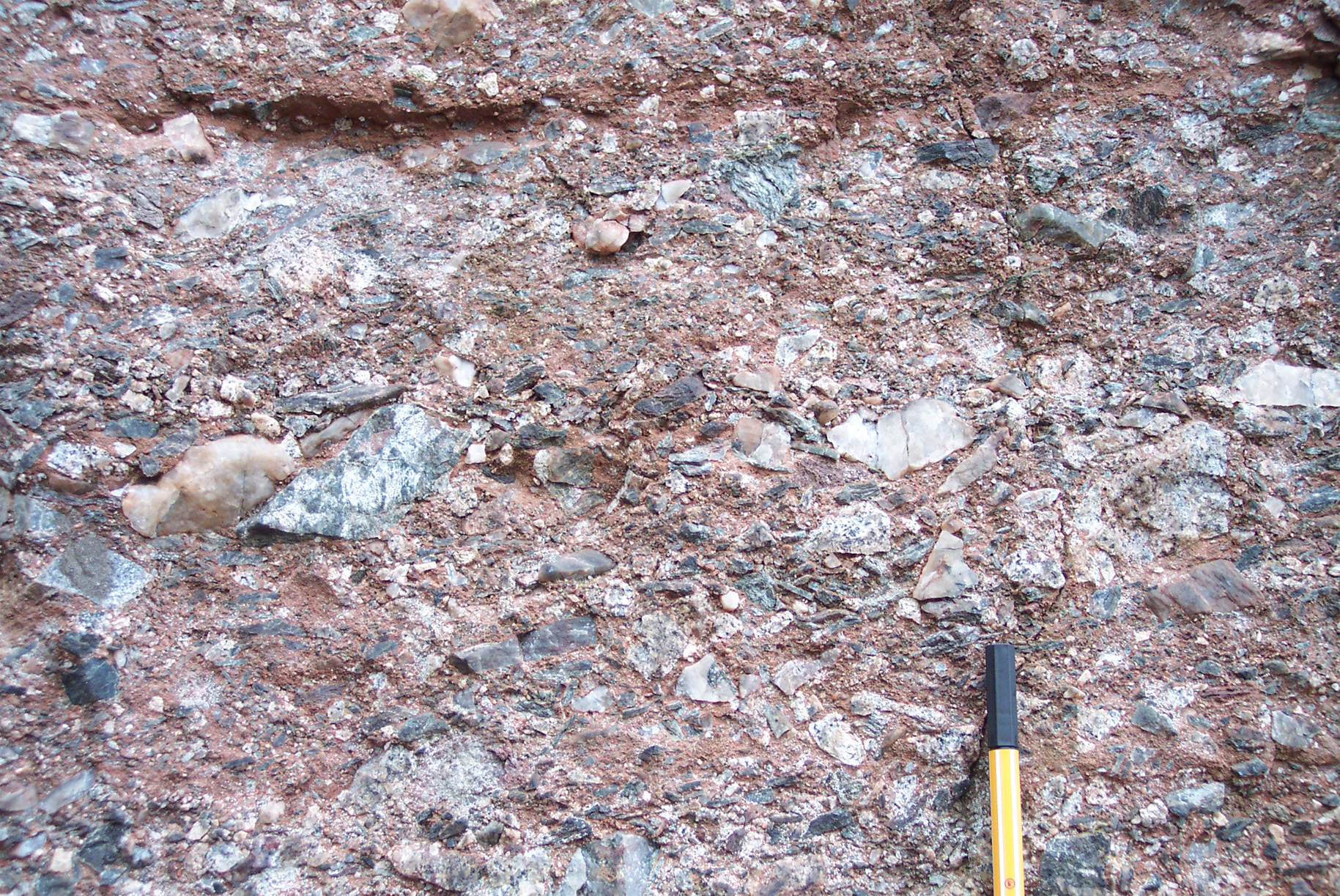
Permian conglomerate of the Eisenach formation from an alluvial fan below Wartburg castle

The Eisenach trough is part of the much larger Werra basin, which in turn is part of the Saar-Unstrut depression of early Permian origin. It was uplifted as one of the fault blocks in the Saxonian tectonic era and is filled with Variscan molasses, named Eisenach formation after the location. It consists mostly of monotonous sequences of reddish conglomerates representing a proximal alluvial fan which originated in debris flows from the Ruhla anticline. Dated in the upper Rotliegend, the Eisenach formation consists of some of the youngest geological units in the Thuringian forest. The lack of volcanic rocks suggests that at the time of the deposition of the Eisenach formation, no significant tectonic processes took place in the Werra basin which was by then a mostly consolidated depositional environment.

=== Ruhla anticline ===
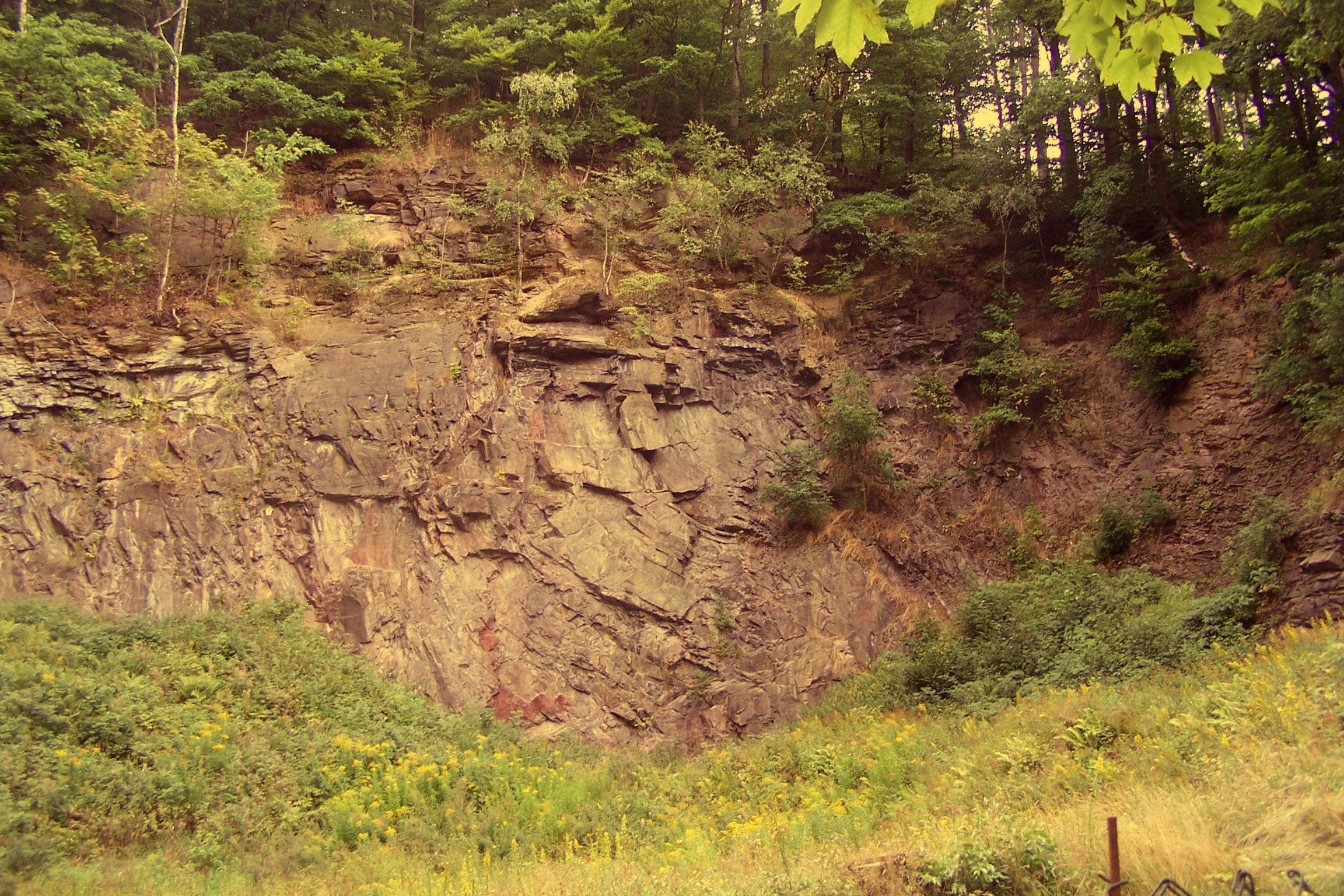
Outcrop of amphibolite and mica schist of the Ruhla Group of the Ruhla Crystalline Complex in a former quarry

In the Ruhla anticline the basement rocks, folded in the Variscan era, are exposed. They are named Ruhlaer Kristallin after the location and are according to Franz Kossmat considered part of the Central German Crystalline Zone, of which Odenwald and Spessart are also constituents. In the Rotliegend era the region formed the crest of a mountain range where the debris originated that was deposited in the Eisenach trough and the northwestern part of the Oberhof trough.

The sedimentary, volcano-sedimentary, and magmatic rocks which were deposited or formed in the area from the Cambrian until the upper Devonian were subjected to intense metamorphosis during the Variscan uplift and are now mostly present in the form of gneiss or schist.

=== Oberhof trough ===
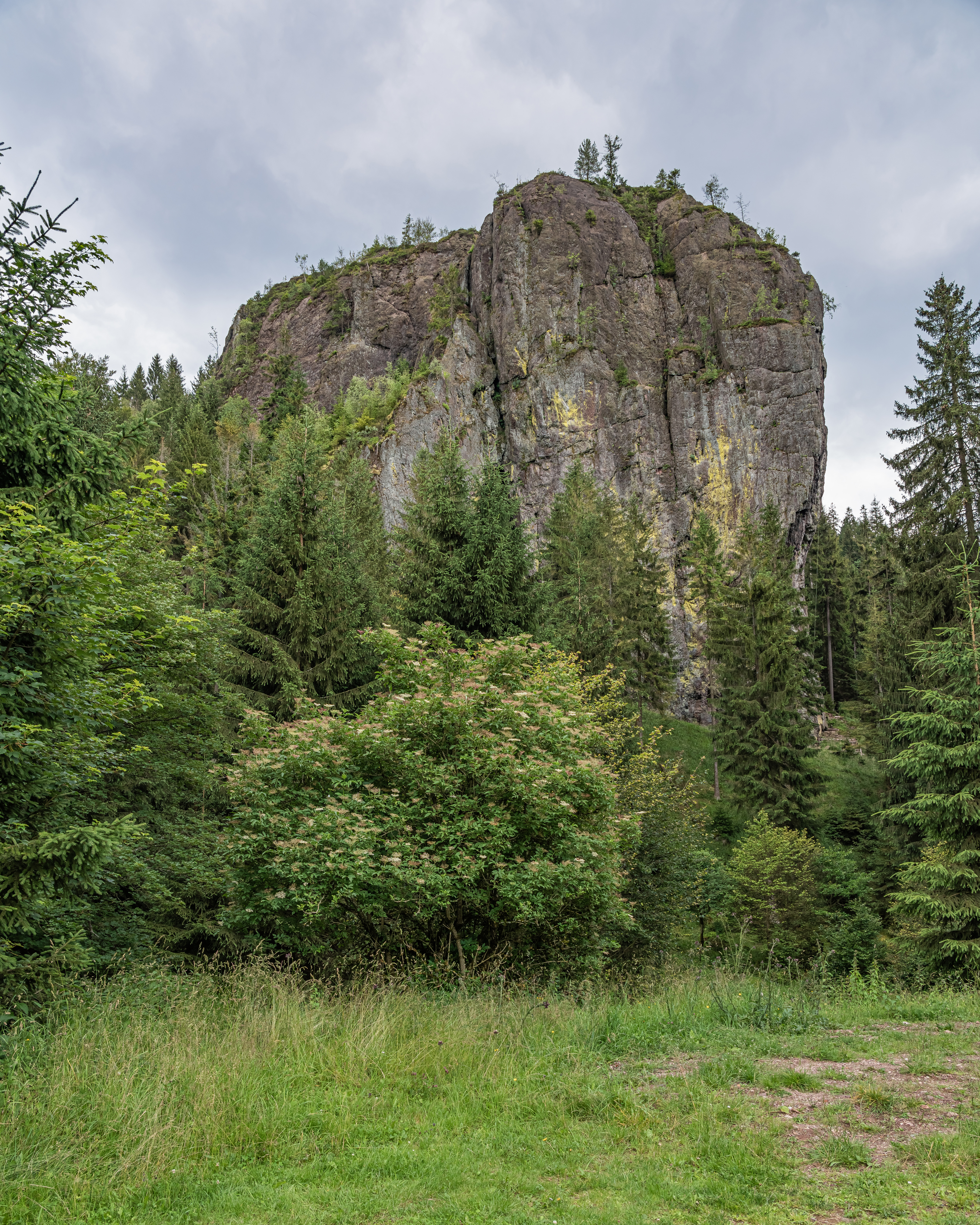
Falkenstein near Tambach-Dietharz, consisting of volcanites of Oberhof formation

The Oberhof trough is by far the largest of the main geologic parts of the Thuringian Forest. It consists of the uplifted part of the so-called Thuringian Forest Basin whose contents can be further subdivided into several formations. Their relative ages have not been fully resolved yet, partly because the Oberhof trough had been a rift zone with intense tectonics and continual changes of the internal relief and of the main areas of deposition. The tectonic processes were accompanied by an intense felsitic volcanism which was the origin of many volcanic rock formations, predominantly rhyolites of porphyric structure with accompanying tuff deposits. These volcanic rocks alternate in sequence with the typical reddish molasse sediments (conglomerates, sandstones, siltstones, and claystones) of the Rotliegend.

=== Little Thuringian Forest ===
The Little Thuringian Forest (German: Kleiner Thüringer Wald) is a narrow horst south of Suhl and northwest of Schleusingen, northwest of Schleuse river, embedded in the Triassic foothills of Southern Thuringia. It is oriented roughly parallel to the Thuringian Forest and, while a separate structure, is geologically very similar to the latter, as it consists of the same rock types such as granite, hornfels, porphyrites, Rotliegend and Zechstein sediments, and thus forms part of the Variscan chain. It is about 11 km (6.8 mi) long and 1 km (0.62 mi) to 2 km (1.2 mi) wide, with an average altitude of 460 m. Mining for fluorite, baryte, and limonite has been attempted there on several occasions, but was given up as unprofitable due to difficult drainage. Large baryte deposits prospected in the 1950s have remained untouched.

=== Waltershausen Foothills ===
The Waltershausen foothills (German: Waltershäuser Vorberge) are a wooded chain of Buntsandstein hills immediately north of and parallel to the Thuringian Forest between Eisenach, Waltershausen, Friedrichroda, and Georgenthal. An outcrop of Muschelkalk rock can be found in their northern part, south of Waltershausen. They are generally regarded a part of the Thuringian Basin, but with numerous deeply eroded river valleys and the dense forestation they resemble very much the Thuringian Forest.

== Climate ==
The Thuringian Forest is located in the Central European transition zone between the Atlantic oceanic climate and the continental climate of Eastern Europe. Humid air arrives mainly from the west, so that the western slopes and the crest of the chain experience the highest levels of precipitation. While the exception of the northwestern part with its lower altitudes (650 mm), the yearly precipitation reaches about 1000 mm, in the higher parts up to about 1300 mm. In contrast, the leeward Thuringian Basin is one of the driest regions in Germany with only around 460 mm to 590 mm of precipitation per year. As the Thuringian Forest forms a barrier to the main weather currents, erosion is strong and has led to a more pronounced relief than in many other of the European low mountain chains.

The mean temperatures decrease with altitude:

Altitude	Thuringian Basin	500 m	700 m	900 m
July	18 °C	15.5 °C	14 °C	12.5 °C
January	-0.5 °C	-2 °C	-3 °C	-4 °C
Yearly average	8.5 °C	6.5 °C	5 °C	4 °C

While the Thuringian Basin experiences less than 100 days per year with temperatures below 0 °C, this number rises to more than 150 in the upper altitudes of the Thuringian Forest.

== Natural regions ==
=== Northwest Thuringian Forest ===
The Northwest Thuringian Forest comprises an area of about 70 km^{2} reaching heights up to 470 m (1,540 ft), hardly exceeding those of the adjacent Buntsandstein forelands to the southwest, but exhibiting a much more pronounced relief. It stretches until Moosbach stream, a tributary or Erbstrom river, in the north east, and to Bundesstraße 19 in the east and south, which follows the upper reaches of Elte river between the villages of Wilhelmsthal and Etterwinden. The predominant rock species is Eisenacher Rotliegend, namely conglomerates and sandstones. The area is known for the so-called Drachenschlucht, a narrow gorge near Eisenach, and the Wartburg castle. The northern part of the area is drained by several streams into the Hörsel, the southern part into the Elte. Hence, the ridge of the Northwestern Thuringian Forest only forms the watershed between Hörsel and the middle course of the Werra.

Notable summits include:

- Großer Drachenstein (470 m)
- Wartberg (about 390 m, north of the main ridge), site of Wartburg castle

The much larger natural region of Central Thuringian Forest with an area of about 850 km^{2}, whose ridge rises mostly above 600 m (2,000 ft), is subdivided into several parts described below in their sequence from the north-west to the south-east.

=== Ruhla Thuringian Forest ===
This part, situated around the town of Ruhla north of the Rennsteig, is geologically formed by the basement rocks of the Ruhlaer Kristallin, consisting of granites, gneiss, and schist. There is no pronounced ridge, summits on both sides of the watershed reach heights of 700 m (2,300 ft) or more. Its northeastern parts drain towards the Hörsel, the southwestern parts towards the middle course of the Werra. The area is limited towards the south-east by state road 1027 between Schwarzhausen and Bad Liebenstein.

Notable summits include:

- Birkenheide (717 m, immediately south of Rennsteig)
- Glöckner (702 m)
- Windsberg (671 m), foothill of Birkenheide and site of Altenstein castle
- Ringberg (639 m) with Alexanderturm (observation tower)

=== Brotterode Thuringian Forest ===
Reaching until Tambach-Dietharz, the part of Thuringian forest around the town of Brotterode is geologically more heterogeneous than the region around Ruhla. State road 1026 between Friedrichroda and Floh-Seligenthal which follows the valleys of the rivers Schilfwasser and Schmalkalde and passes through Kleinschmalkalden and state road 1028 between Georgenthal and Floh-Seligenthal which follows the valleys of the rivers Apfelstädt and Flohbach divide the area into segments. In this area the mountain ridge becomes more pronounced. The summit of Großer Inselsberg of volcanic origin causes a marked shift of the ridge towards the north. South of Georgenthal, the mountain range becomes the watershed between Elbe and Weser.

Notable summits include:

- Großer Inselsberg (916.5 m) between Brotterode and Tabarz, popular tourist destination
- Großer Weißenberg (747 m), location of a tripoint between the former countries of Saxe-Meiningen, Saxe-Coburg and Gotha, and Kurhessen and of today's districts Gotha, Schmalkalden-Meiningen, and Wartburgkreis.
- Gerberstein (728 m) with an outlook platform

=== Tambach-Oberhof Thuringian Forest ===
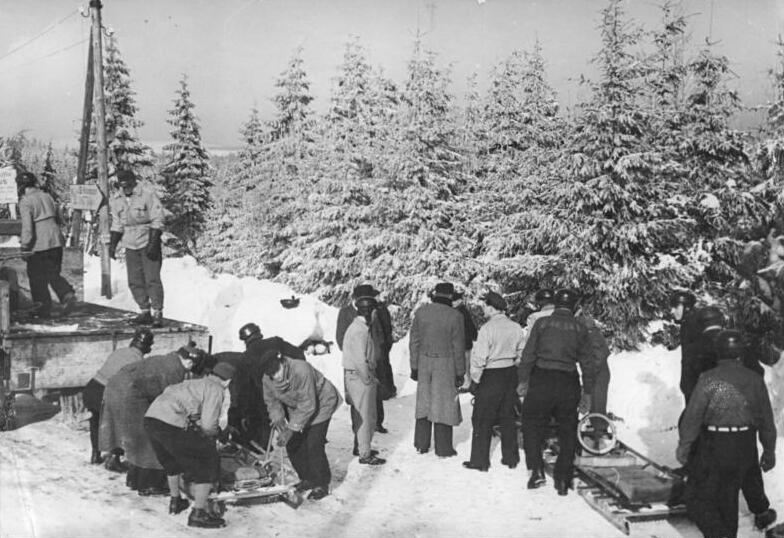
East German winter sport championships in Oberhof, February 1951.

The B 247 from Luisenthal via Oberhof and Zella-Mehlis to Suhl, which follows the Ohra to the north, a section along the Lichtenau to the south and finally the lower reaches of the Mühlwasser, together with the slightly more than 10 km long L 1028 road that runs parallel to it to the northwest separates this natural sub-division of the Thuringian Forest from the rest. Apart from the south, this region is traversed by very few public roads and is only populated in the south – in the villages of Schnellbach and Struth-Helmershof in the municipality of Floh-Seligenthal, the Rotterode, Unterschönau and Oberschönau suburbs of Steinbach-Hallenberg and the town of Zella-Mehlis.

The Elbe-Weser watershed, accompanied by the Rennsteig, reaches heights of around 900 m at several places southwest to west of Oberhof, but does not really form any individual mountains and has very much the character of a mountain crest. By contrast, the Großer Hermannsberg and Ruppberg (see below) that rise to the southwest of the ridge are better known and popular tourist destinations. To the northeast, where the terrain gradually flattens out, are two of the 3 largest reservoirs in the Thuringian Forest (see below). The best known rock formation in the mountain range, the Falkenstein, is also found in this area.

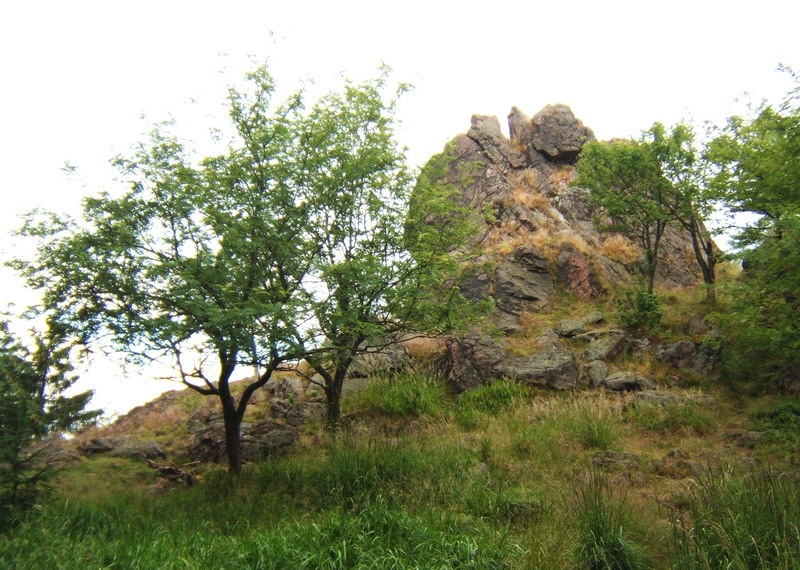
The main crags on Gebrannter Stein (897 m)

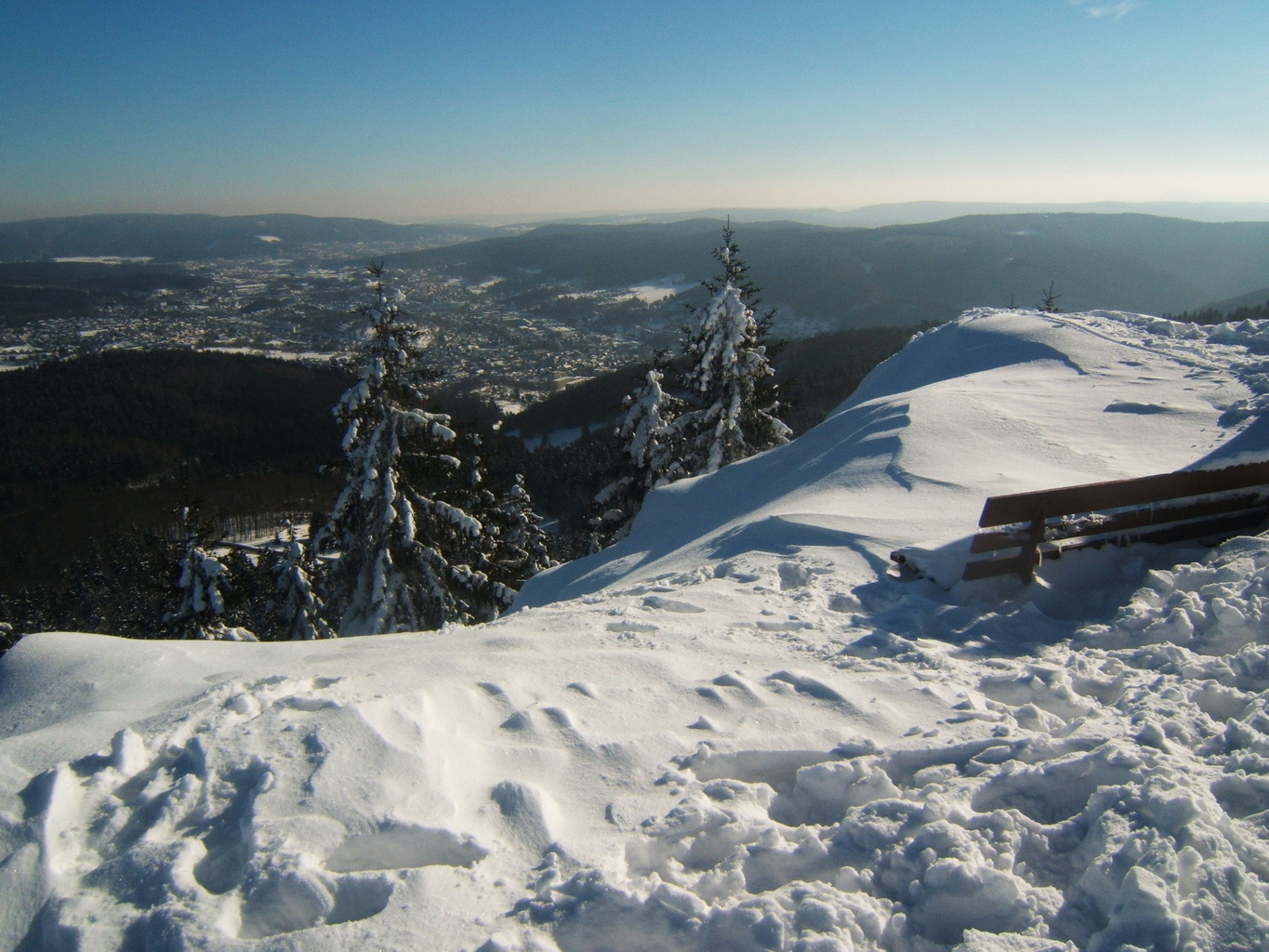
View from the Ruppberg near Zella-Mehlis

Notable summits include:

- Schützenberg (904 m, main crest southwest of Oberhof)
- Greifenberg (901 m, main crest west of Oberhof)
- Gebrannter Stein (897 m, south of the Rennsteig, north of Zella-Mehlis) with remarkable cliffs
- Großer Hermannsberg (867 m, southwest flank) - local mountain for Steinbach-Hallenberg, with observation tower
- Ruppberg (866 m, southwest flank) - local mountain (northwest) for Zella-Mehlis, with observation tower

==== Rivers and lakes ====
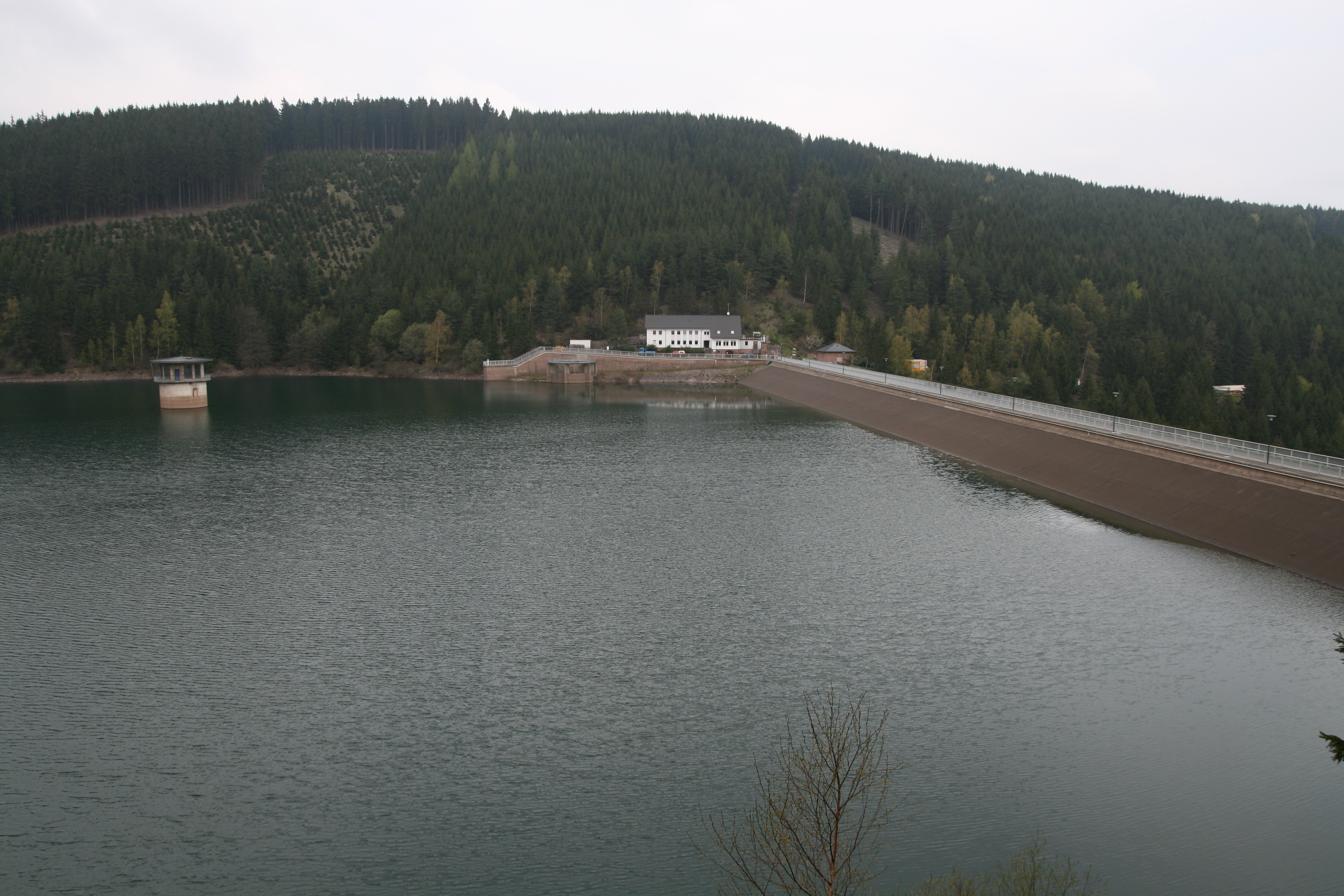
The Ohra Dam

The northeastern flank of the mountains is drained by right tributaries of the Apfelstädt, especially the Schmalwasser, and left tributaries of the Ohra, notably the Kernwasser, via the (Apfelstädt,) Gera and Unstrut into the Saale. The Apfelstädt is impounded by the Tambach-Dietharz Dam into a small lake and the Schmalwasser and Ohra by the Schmalwasser and Ohra Dams into larger reservoirs.

The south is drained by the Asbach which flows via the Stille into the Schmalkalde and by rivers and streams belonging to the fan-like system of tributaries of Hasel (Werra), in particular the Schwarza, Häselbach, Lichtenau and a stream from Albrechts, feeding into the Werra.

=== Gehlberg Thuringian Forest ===
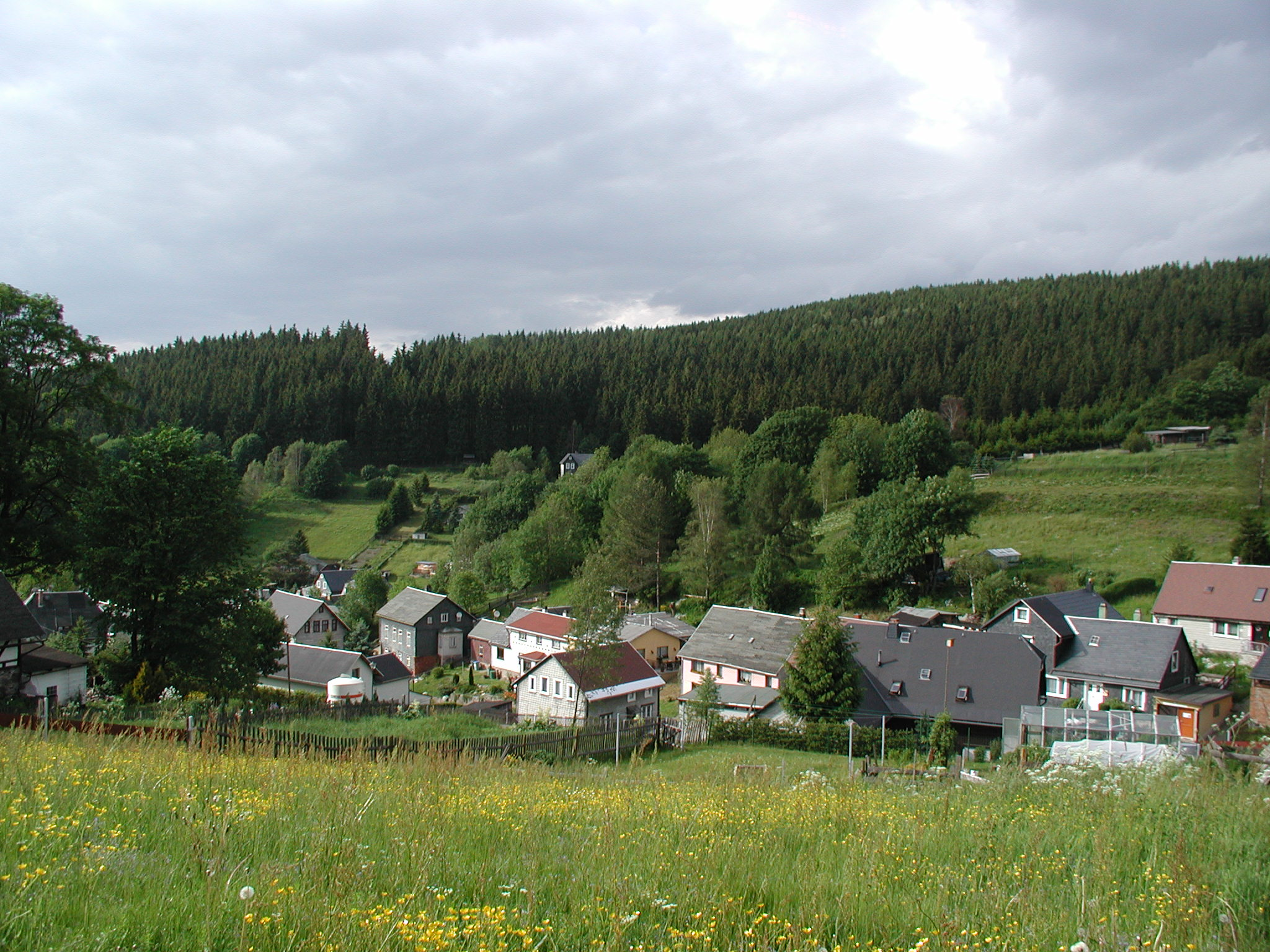
View at a part of Stützerbach

This region between federal roads B 4 between Ilmenau and Stützerbach, following the rivers Ilm, Lengwitz, and Nahe, and B 247 between Luisenthal and Suhl contains the three highest summits as well as the fifth highest summit of the whole range. The only settlements wholly within this region are Gehlberg north of Rennsteig and Vesser south of it. Parts of Schmiedefeld and Goldlauter-Heidersbach (part of Suhl) also extend into this part of the Forest. The highest summits crowning the mountain ridge are of volcanic origin. The terrain dips rapidly down to heights below 800 m towards the north-east, while heights remain above this altitude south-west of Rennsteig for some distance in the horseshoe-shaped Adlersberg massif.

Motorway A 71 and the Neudietendorf–Ritschenhausen railway pass under the Brandleite Massif between Gehlberg and Oberhof in Rennsteig road tunnel and Brandleite Tunnel.

The area is drained towards the north by the river Lütsche which feeds the Lütsche reservoir and by Wilde Gera and Zahme Gera towards Gera river and Unstrut, and by Freibach stream, a tributary of Ilm river, and towards the south by Lauter, a tributary of Hasel, and mainly by Erle, feeding the Erle reservoir, Breitenbach, Vesser, and Nahe into Schleuse.

Notable summits include:

- Großer Beerberg (984 m, main crest 3,4 km east of Zella-Mehlis, highest elevation in the Thuringian Forest)
- Schneekopf (978 m), transmitter site and observation tower
- Großer Finsterberg (944 m), with observation tower
- Großer Eisenberg (907 m), whose name bears witness to ore mining activities in the past
- Adlersberg massive (up to 892 m) with Ringberghaus hotel on Ringberg (746 m), a northwestern foothill

=== Frauenwald-Neustadt Thuringian Forest ===
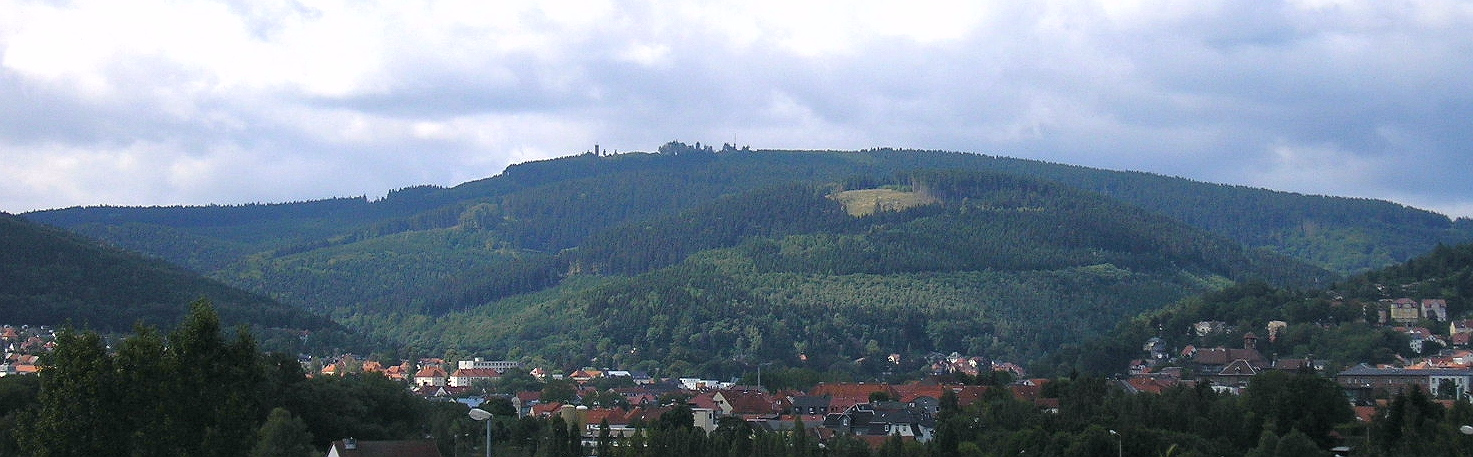
Kickelhahn with Ilmenau in the foreground

The region around Frauenwald and Neustadt forms the most south-eastern part of the Thuringian forest proper. It is limited by state road B 4 in the northwest, and by a line along the rivers Talwasser (with Ilmsenbach), Neubrunn, and Schleuse. The adjacent Thuringian Slate Mountains form a geographically and geologically separate natural region, although they are often popularly referred to as a continuation of the former range. Populated places wholly within the region are Frauenwald, Allzunah, Neustadt am Rennsteig, and Oehrenstock. Parts of Stützerbach also reach into this area. Roads follow the Rennsteig, the mountain crests, or the valleys of the rivers.

The main ridge of the mountain range exceeds altitudes of 800 m in several places. The highest and best known summit is Kickelhahn (861 metres above sea level) southwest of Ilmenau. As seen from there, all secondary crests towards the northeast and the southwest clearly originate from the main one and show even and gentle slopes, not counting the steep descent into the foreland. The southwestern crests reach altitudes of about 800 m. The dividing valleys are often narrow gorges.

The zone drains:

- Northeast by the fan of the Ilm's tributaries, towards the Saale
- Southwest by the Nahe, Trenkbach, Schleuse, Gabel, Tanne, and tributaries of the Neubrunn towards the Werra.

The Schleuse, Gabel and Tanne feed the Schönbrunn reservoir.

Notable summits include:

- Kickelhahn (861 m) with observation tower, "backyard mountain" of Ilmenau
- Großer Dreiherrnstein (838 m), 500 m from the tripoint of the former countries Schwarzburg-Arnstadt, Saxe-Eisenach, and Henneberg
- Großer Hundskopf (824 m) with a transmitter site on its foothill Kalter Staudenkopf (768 m)
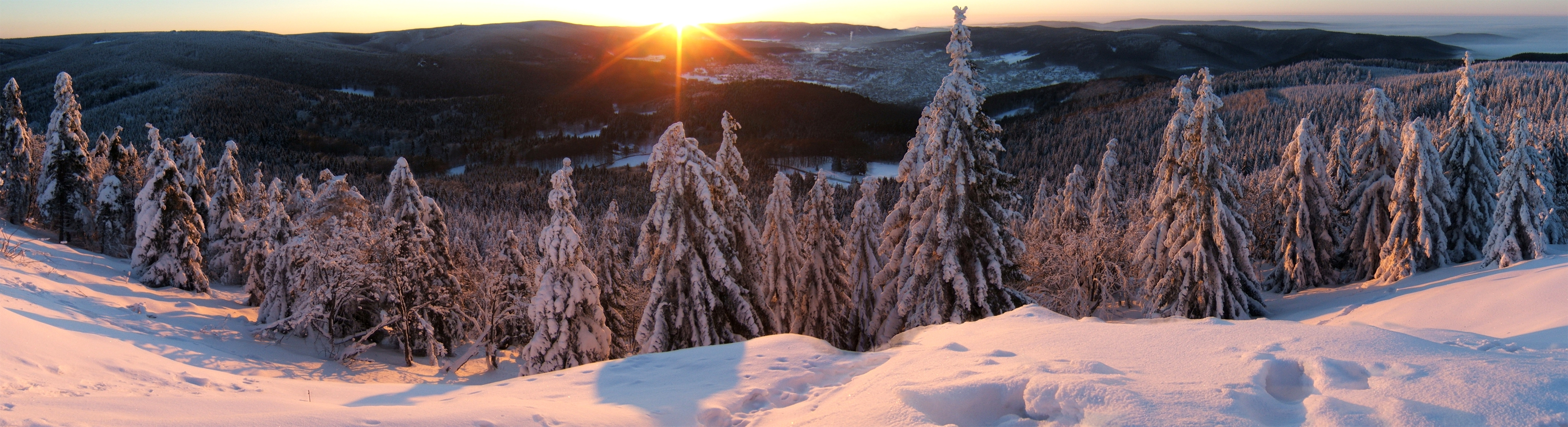
Sunrise on the mountain Ruppberg near Zella-Mehlis (Thuringian Forest, Germany)

== Tourism and sights ==
Due to its geographical characteristics and the favourable climate, the Thuringian Forest is an important year-round tourist destination. Winter sports play an important role, facilities of international significance are concentrated around Oberhof. Famous sights include Wartburg Castle outside Eisenach where Martin Luther lived in exile, the selenite cave (Marienglashöhle, a former mine) near Friedrichroda, the firearms museum in Suhl, and the historic town centres of Eisenach and Ilmenau.

The Rennsteig trail is the most popular long-distance hiking trail in Germany. It is part of:

- the mountainous path from Eisenach to Budapest
- the E3 European long distance path
- the Thüringen-Rhein-Wanderweg
- (partly) the pilgrims' way or Via Porta. The latter links the abbeys of Volkenroda and Waldsassen.

== See also ==
- Thuringian Forest Nature Park

== Notes and references ==
Notes
