= Oberhof, Germany =

Oberhof
- Town
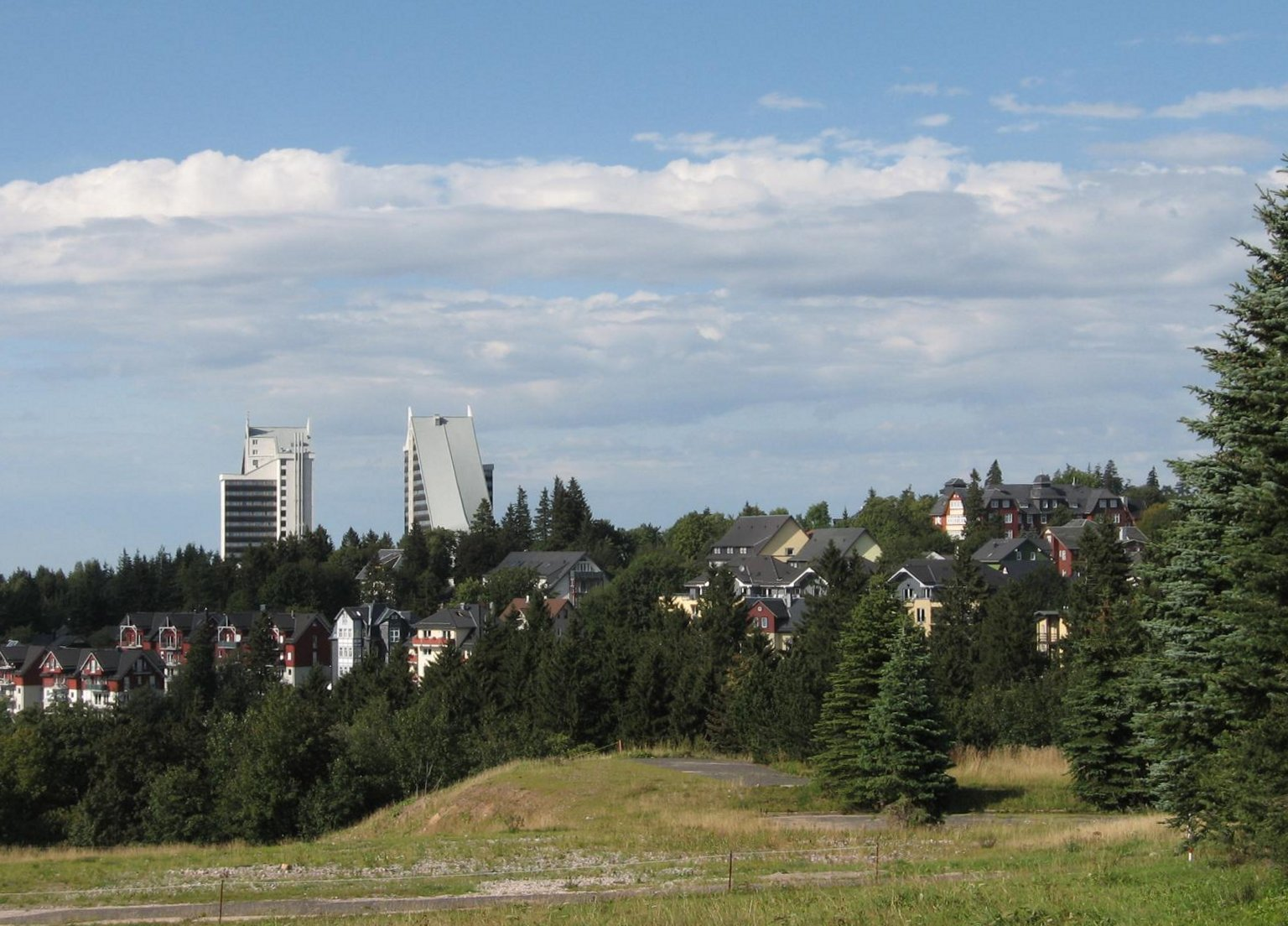
- Oberhof in August 2006

- Coat of arms

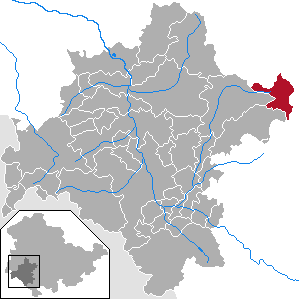
- Location of Oberhof within Schmalkalden-Meiningen district
- Interactive map of Oberhof
- Location within Germany Location within Thuringia
- Coordinates: 50°42′19″N 10°43′33″E
- Country: Germany
- State: Thuringia
- District: Schmalkalden-Meiningen

Government
  - Mayor (2024–30): Daniel Fischer

Area
  - Total: 23.4 km^{2} (9.0 sq mi)
- Elevation: 823 m (2,700 ft)

Population (2025-12-31)
  - Total: 1,592
  - Density: 68.0/km^{2} (176/sq mi)
- Time zone: UTC+01:00 (CET)
  - Summer (DST): UTC+02:00 (CEST)
- Postal codes: 98559
- Dialling codes: 036842
- Vehicle registration: SM
- Website: www.oberhof.de

Oberhof (German pronunciation: [ˈoːbɐhoːf]) is a town in the Schmalkalden-Meiningen district of Thuringia, Germany. Located in the Thuringian Forest mountain range, it is a winter sports center and health resort. With 1,625 inhabitants (December 2016), it is visited by 144,000 tourists every year (2016). The town obtained its official city status in 1985.

== History ==
Oberhof was first mentioned in a document in 1470. The village in the Black Forest department belonged to various Ernestine duchies, most recently to the Duchy of Saxe-Coburg and Gotha from 1826 to 1918. In 1830, Ernest I, Duke of Saxe-Coburg and Gotha had a hunting lodge built. In 1861 the first vacation guests came to the village. With the completion of the Brandleite Tunnel of the Neudietendorf-Ritschenhausen railway, Oberhof received a railroad connection in 1884, which enabled the expansion of tourism.

After the founding of the Oberhof Winter Sports Association, on the initiative of the Oberhof physician Kurt Weidhaas, in February 1904, the town developed into a center of winter sports. In 1906 the first bobsleigh run and the first ski jump were inaugurated. In 1931, world championships were held in the town for the first time, in two-man bobsleigh and Nordic combined on the Hindenburg ski jump.

From 1951 to 1956, the GDR Winter Sports Championships were held in Oberhof. In 1964, the construction of the large ski jump on the Rennsteig for ski jumping was completed and in 1971 the luge track was finished, on which the FIL World Luge Championships were held for the first time in 1973.

From 1968 to 1978, Oberhof was expanded and reconstructed with extensive demolition of the existing building fabric, which completely changed the character of the place. Walter Ulbricht, the chairman of the Council of State, called in his Berlin architect Hermann Henselmann for the planning. Both were fond of representative symbolic architecture. When Ulbricht was replaced, not all the plans were realized. The accommodation capacity of the hotels and homes was increased to 4500 beds. This included the construction of the large hotel complexes Panorama (1969) in the shape of ski jumps, Rennsteig (1973) in the shape of a racing stone and Fritz Weineck (1975). In 1971, the Obere Hof, with seven restaurants, was opened in the center of the village as an adventure center. A new residential area was built in prefabricated slab construction.

A high ropes course was built on the grounds of the spa park in 2001 and dismantled in 2016. In 2011, the resort had 3500 guest beds.

On October 7, 1985, Oberhof received the town charter.

== Geography ==
Oberhof is located in the Thuringian Forest, a low mountain range, at an altitude of about 815 meters. The town is located on a plateau, which is why there are no great differences in altitude in the built-up area. About four kilometers to the southeast are the two highest mountains in Thuringia, the 983-meter-high Großer Beerberg and the 978-meter-high Schneekopf. Southwest of Oberhof there are also two Rennsteig passes: the pass at the Grenzadler (former state border between the Duchy of Saxe-Coburg and Gotha and Prussia) and the pass at the Rondell monument. Several rivers also rise near Oberhof, the Gera in the east, the Ohra in the north, the Hasel in the south and the Schönau in the west. The surroundings of Oberhof are completely forested, the most common tree species is spruce.

=== Climate ===
The climate of Oberhof is very harsh, therefore the place could not develop before 1900. Unlike the other villages of the Thuringian Forest, Oberhof is located unprotected to the north, west and east on a plateau. The nearest weather station is on the Schmücke about six kilometers away on the Rennsteig. The annual precipitation is very high with about 1300 mm, the average annual temperature is in the low range with 4.4 °C. The average July temperature is 12.8 °C, and the January temperature is -4.0 °C. Snow usually falls from mid-November to the end of March.

Like many low mountain regions dependent on winter sports, Oberhof is also affected by the effects of climate change. Thus, the region is no longer "snow-sure", as was still the case in the past.

Climate data for Oberhof (Schmücke), 1991–2020 normals, extremes 1936–present
Month	Jan	Feb	Mar	Apr	May	Jun	Jul	Aug	Sep	Oct	Nov	Dec	Year
Record high °C (°F)	10.8 (51.4)	14.4 (57.9)	17.4 (63.3)	26.1 (79.0)	26.9 (80.4)	30.7 (87.3)	32.6 (90.7)	31.3 (88.3)	27.3 (81.1)	22.8 (73.0)	18.4 (65.1)	12.1 (53.8)	32.6 (90.7)
Mean maximum °C (°F)	6.1 (43.0)	7.6 (45.7)	12.7 (54.9)	18.4 (65.1)	22.2 (72.0)	25.6 (78.1)	26.7 (80.1)	26.5 (79.7)	21.7 (71.1)	16.9 (62.4)	11.6 (52.9)	7.2 (45.0)	28.5 (83.3)
Mean daily maximum °C (°F)	−0.8 (30.6)	0.0 (32.0)	3.6 (38.5)	8.9 (48.0)	13.3 (55.9)	16.4 (61.5)	18.5 (65.3)	18.5 (65.3)	13.7 (56.7)	8.5 (47.3)	3.5 (38.3)	0.2 (32.4)	8.7 (47.7)
Daily mean °C (°F)	−2.8 (27.0)	−2.3 (27.9)	0.6 (33.1)	5.0 (41.0)	9.2 (48.6)	12.3 (54.1)	14.3 (57.7)	14.3 (57.7)	10.2 (50.4)	5.8 (42.4)	1.3 (34.3)	−1.8 (28.8)	5.5 (41.9)
Mean daily minimum °C (°F)	−4.7 (23.5)	−4.4 (24.1)	−1.9 (28.6)	1.8 (35.2)	5.6 (42.1)	8.7 (47.7)	10.9 (51.6)	11.0 (51.8)	7.4 (45.3)	3.6 (38.5)	−0.5 (31.1)	−3.7 (25.3)	2.8 (37.0)
Mean minimum °C (°F)	−12.7 (9.1)	−11.6 (11.1)	−8.1 (17.4)	−5.2 (22.6)	−0.5 (31.1)	3.1 (37.6)	5.9 (42.6)	5.7 (42.3)	2.5 (36.5)	−2.2 (28.0)	−6.7 (19.9)	−10.6 (12.9)	−15.1 (4.8)
Record low °C (°F)	−25.5 (−13.9)	−28.8 (−19.8)	−19.0 (−2.2)	−12.2 (10.0)	−7.9 (17.8)	−1.0 (30.2)	2.5 (36.5)	1.9 (35.4)	−1.6 (29.1)	−8.1 (17.4)	−14.9 (5.2)	−22.2 (−8.0)	−28.8 (−19.8)
Average precipitation mm (inches)	133.6 (5.26)	104.1 (4.10)	106.0 (4.17)	73.4 (2.89)	96.5 (3.80)	90.9 (3.58)	129.9 (5.11)	96.2 (3.79)	111.0 (4.37)	110.9 (4.37)	119.7 (4.71)	142.5 (5.61)	1,313.3 (51.70)
Average extreme snow depth cm (inches)	60.1 (23.7)	70.9 (27.9)	61.4 (24.2)	29.5 (11.6)	1.1 (0.4)	0 (0)	0 (0)	0 (0)	0 (0)	4.0 (1.6)	18.5 (7.3)	43.0 (16.9)	85.6 (33.7)
Average precipitation days (≥ 1.0 mm)	20.9	18.0	18.2	14.6	15.5	16.4	17.3	15.1	15.1	17.4	19.3	22.0	208.9
Average relative humidity (%)	93.6	91.1	87.4	78.8	79.3	79.6	78.9	78.6	85.8	91.4	93.8	93.9	85.9
Mean monthly sunshine hours	44.3	65.4	109.9	161.2	183.4	182.8	190.8	188.4	135.0	89.9	46.2	38.8	1,434.7
Source 1: World Meteorological Organization
Source 2: Deutscher Wetterdienst / SKlima.de

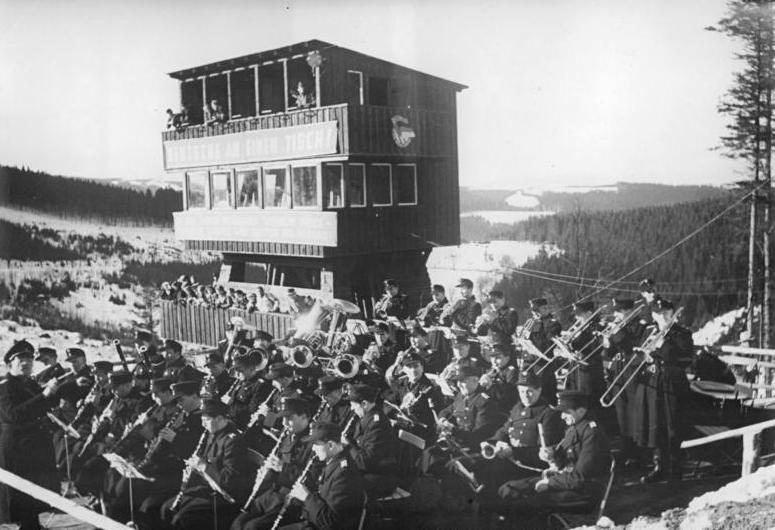
The Band of the Berlin People's Police (Orchester der Berliner Volkspolizei) in Oberhof.

== International sports events ==
- 1931: Two-man Bobsleigh World Championship and FIS Nordic World Ski Championships
- 1973: FIL World Luge Championships
- 1979: FIL European Luge Championships
- 1985: FIL World Luge Championships
- 1998: FIL European Luge Championships
- 2004: Biathlon World Championship and FIL European Luge Championships
- 2008: FIL World Luge Championships
- 2023: Biathlon World Championship

== Attractions ==
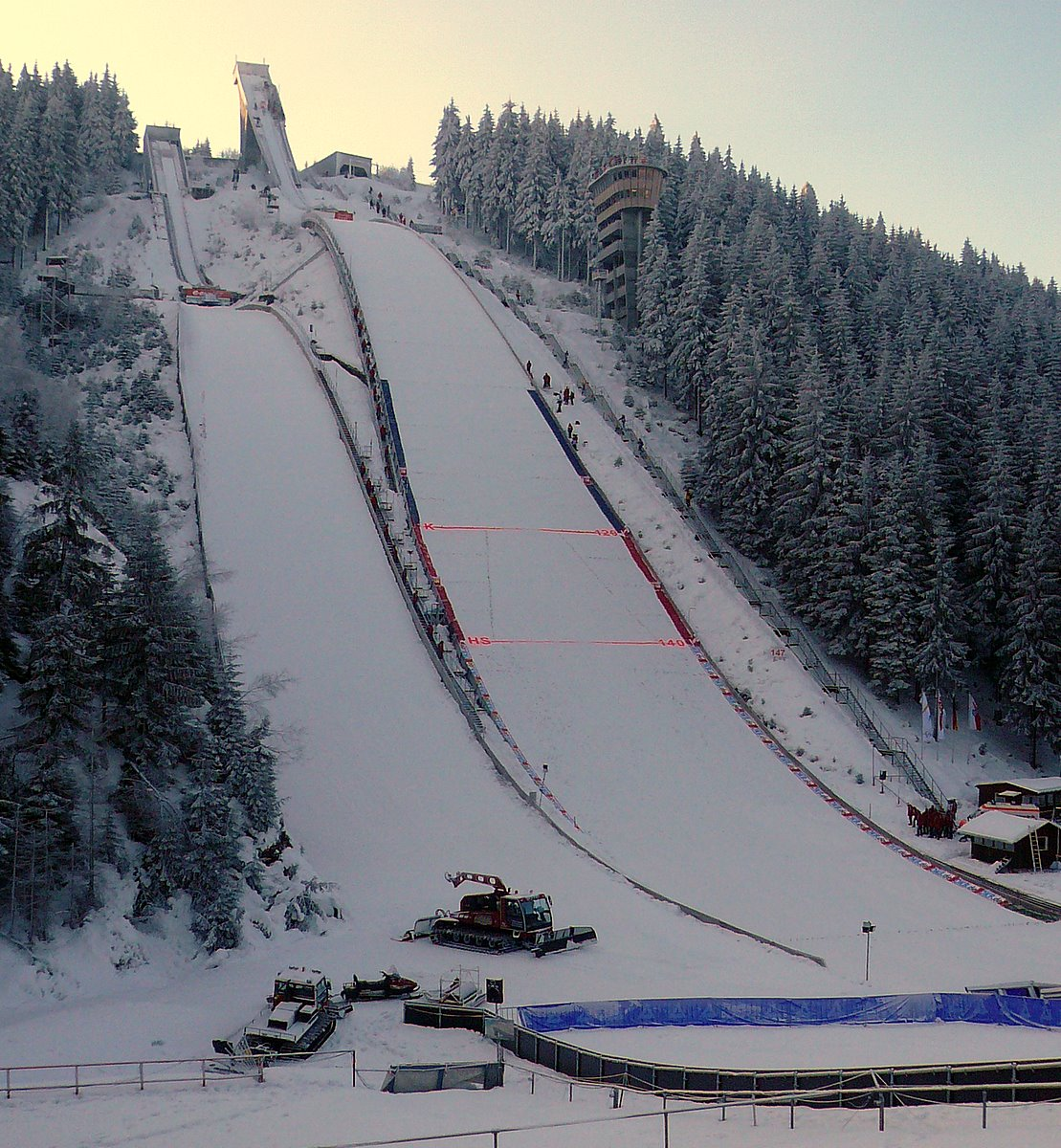
Kanzlersgrund

- Rennsteiggarten Oberhof, a botanical garden for mountain plants
- Schanzenanlage im Kanzlersgrund, two ski jumping hills
- biathlon stadium Lotto Thüringen Arena am Rennsteig
- Rennrodelbahn Oberhof, a bobsleigh, luge, and skeleton track
- Lotto Thüringen Skisporthalle Oberhof, a cross-country skiing area
- H2Oberhof, an indoor swimming pool

== International relations ==
Oberhof, Germany is twinned with:

- Winterberg, Germany
- Bad Neustadt an der Saale, Germany
- Lillehammer, Norway

== Notable people ==
- Hans Marr
- Horst Nickel
