= Mühlwasser =

Location
- Country: Germany
- States: Thuringia

Physical characteristics
- Mouth
  - location: Lauter
  - coordinates: 50.6175°N 10.6983°E

Basin features
- Progression: Lauter→ Hasel→ Werra→ Weser→ North Sea

Mühlwasser is a river of Thuringia, Germany. It flows into the Lauter near Suhl.

== See also ==
- List of rivers of Thuringia
