= Rettbach =

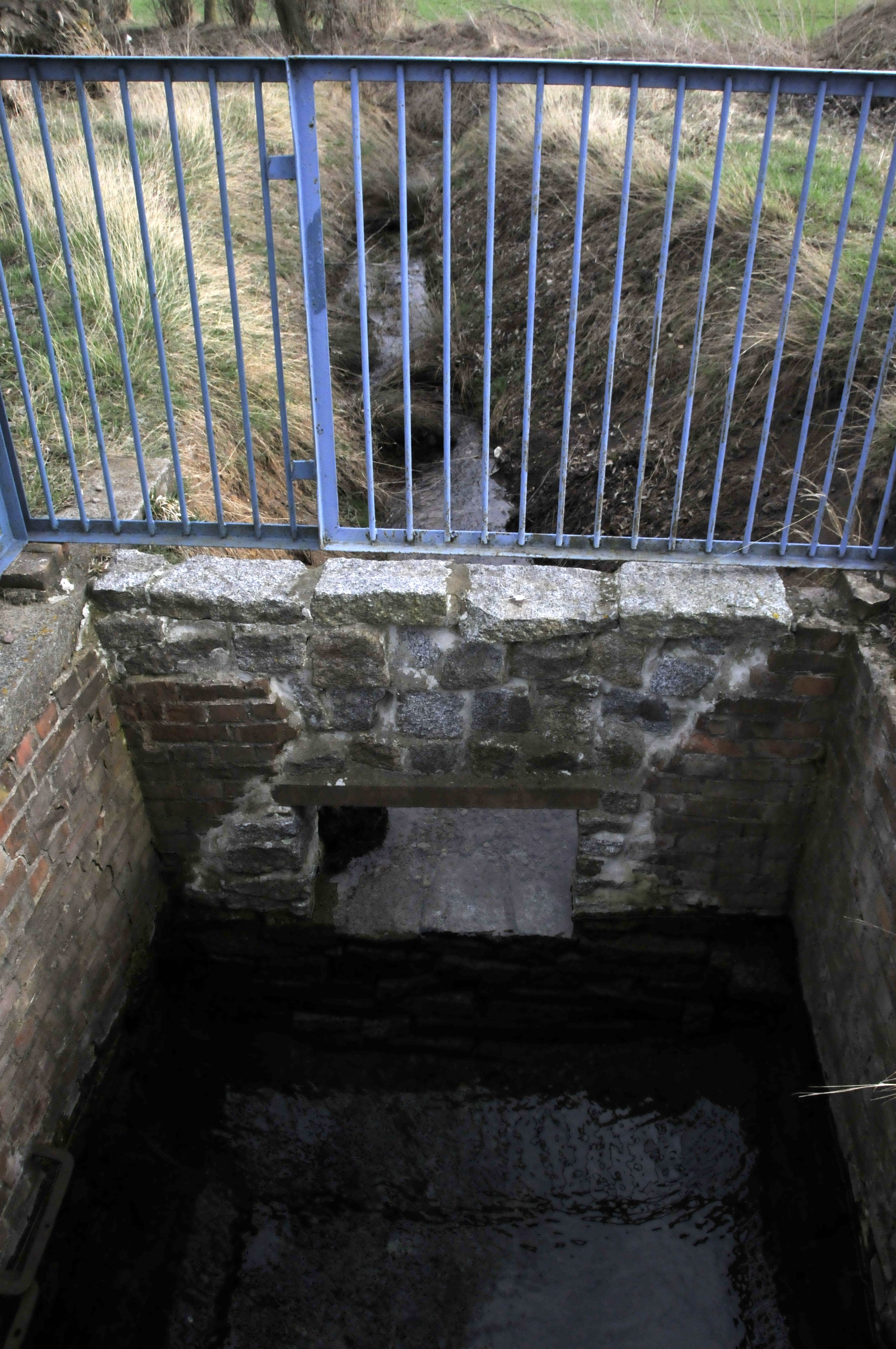

Location
- Country: Germany
- States: Thuringia

Physical characteristics
- Mouth
  - location: Rot
  - coordinates: 50.9208°N 10.8329°E

Basin features
- Progression: Rot→ Apfelstädt→ Gera→ Unstrut→ Saale→ Elbe→ North Sea

Rettbach is a river of Thuringia, Germany. It flows into the Rot in Cobstädt (borough of Drei Gleichen).

== See also ==
- List of rivers of Thuringia
