= Lichtenau (river) =

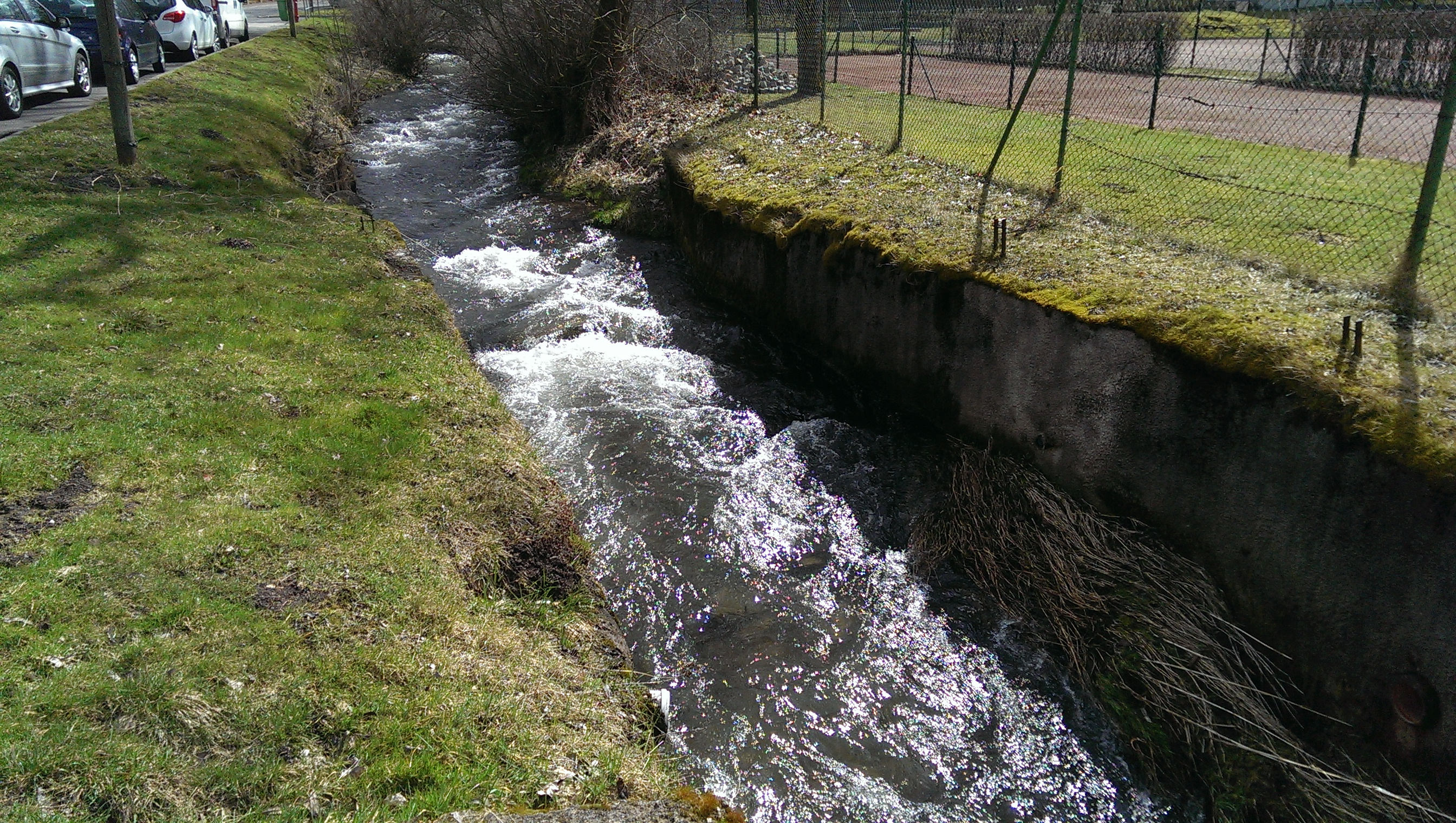

Location
- Country: Germany
- States: Thuringia

Physical characteristics
- Mouth
  - location: Schwarza
  - coordinates: 50.6197°N 10.5338°E

Basin features
- Progression: Schwarza→ Hasel→ Werra→ Weser→ North Sea

Lichtenau (German pronunciation: [ˈlɪçtənaʊ]) is a river of Thuringia, Germany. It flows into the river Schwarza in the village Schwarza.

== See also ==
- List of rivers of Thuringia
