= Brandleite Tunnel =

Railway tunnel in Germany

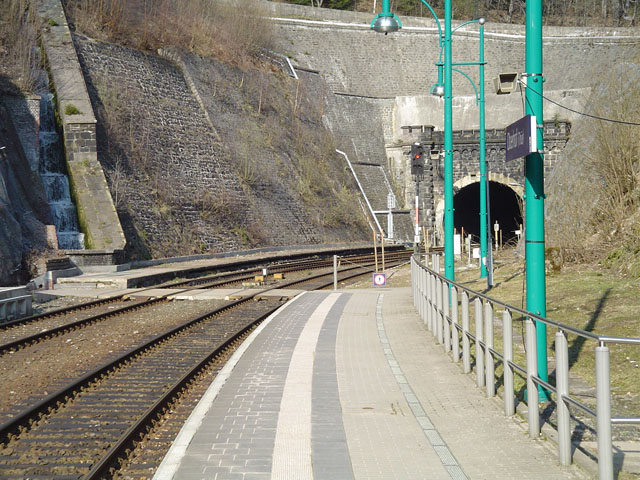
- Western portal seen from Oberhof station
- Interactive map of Brandleite Tunnel

Overview
- Line: Neudietendorf–Ritschenhausen railway
- Location: between Gehlberg and Oberhof, Thuringia
- Coordinates: Western Portal: 50°41′5″N 10°42′42″E; Eastern Portal: 50°41′15″N 10°45′16″E

Operation
- Work began: 28 May 1881
- Opened: 1 August 1884
- Rebuilt: 2004/2005
- Operator: DB Netz

Technical
- Length: 3,039 m (9,970 ft)
- No. of tracks: double throughout
- Track gauge: 1435 mm
- Electrified: no
- Tunnel clearance: 5.85 m (19.2 ft)
- Width: 8.20 m (26.9 ft)

Brandleite Tunnel is a single-bore, double-tracked railway tunnel between the stations of Gehlberg (598 m a.s.l.) and Oberhof (639 m a.s.l.) in Thuringia. It leads the Neudietendorf–Ritschenhausen railway beneath the Brandleite massif, a part of the ridge of the Thuringian Forest that reaches a height of 897 m a.s.l. in this area. The tunnel is mostly straight, only at the Oberhof end the tracks curve slightly towards the south. With a length of 3,039 m (9,970 ft) it is the longest railway tunnel in Thuringia, and was the longest in the network of Deutsche Reichsbahn in the GDR. The maximum rock cover amounts to 237 m (778 ft).

== History ==
Building started on 28 May 1881 in Oberhof. The tunnel was built in the so-called Belgian manner, where first a pilot tunnel is bored at floor level, then widened towards the roof, the lining is started from the top and underpinned while the remainder of the cross-section is excavated. Five auxiliary shafts were sunk. Hard crystalline rock and water inflow caused difficulties during construction. Breakthrough was achieved on 7 February 1883 with a vertical deviation of 21 cm (8.3 in) and a horizontal deviation of 25 cm (9.8 in), a very good precision for that era. Stonework was finished on 19 March 1884, the tunnel was opened for traffic on 1 August 1884. Of 1380 workers employed in the construction, five died in accidents, and about 100 from disease.

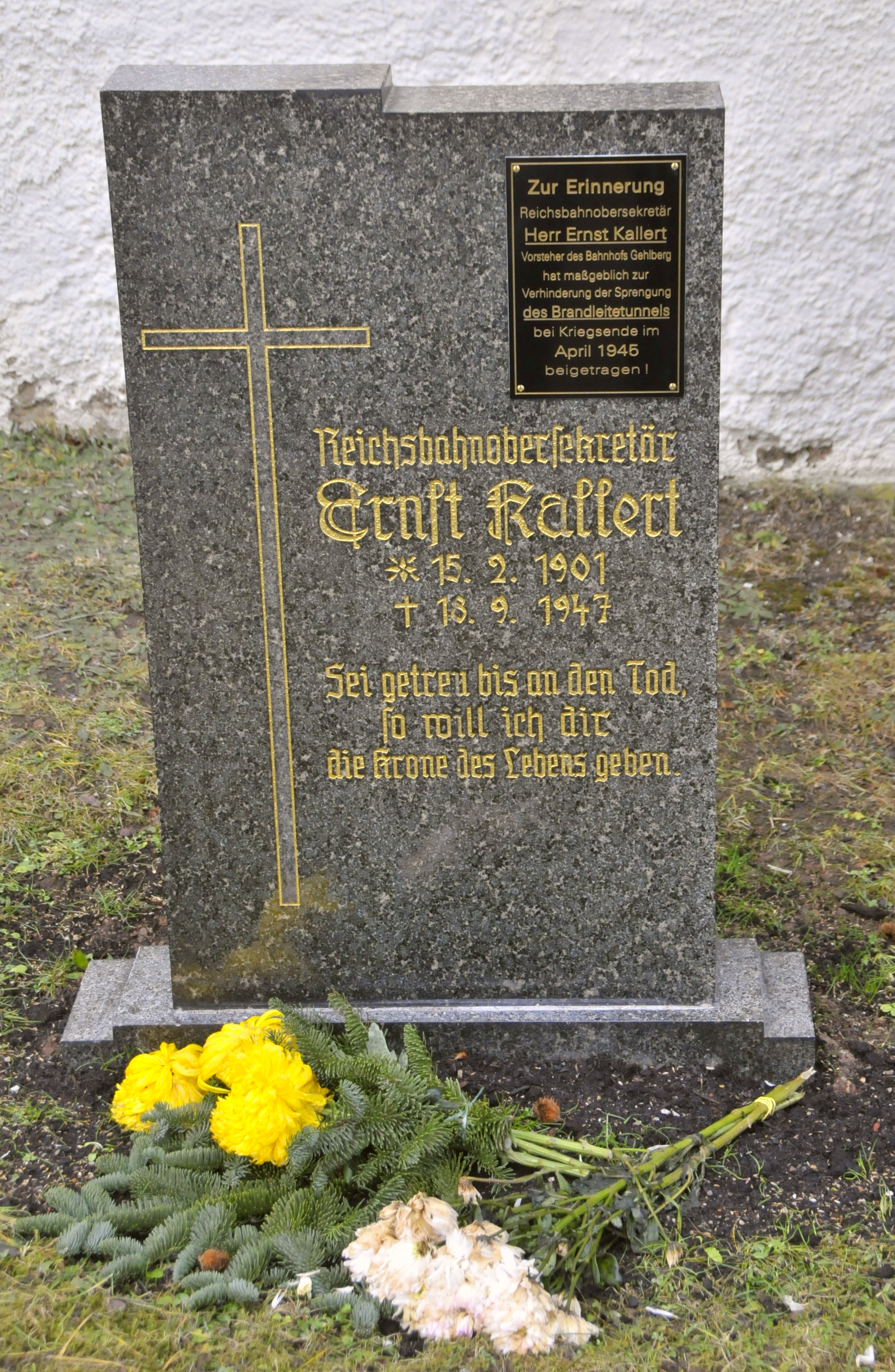
Memorial stone for Ernst Kallert in Gehlberg cemetery

The roof of the tunnel was strengthenend in the 1930s. Plans to dynamite the tunnel in April 1945 were reportedly stopped by the actions of Reichsbahn senior secretary Ernst Kallert (1901–1947).

The Rennsteig road tunnel which was opened on 5 July 2003 crosses above Brandleite tunnel about 350 m from its western end at a vertical distance of 5 ... 6.5 m. The effects of its construction, in particular on the water circulation and the upgrade of the railway line for tilting trains were reasons to rehabilitate the aging tunnel during 11 months in 2004/2005, taking significantly longer than the originally planned 5 months. On this occasion, the traditional tracks and trackbed were replaced by ballastless track in an asphalt bed.

== Technical information ==
The tunnel portals are located at 36.855 km and 39.884 km from Neudietendorf station. The track distance is 3.50 m (11.5 ft). The tunnel has been excavated through quartz porphyry, tuff, shale, and sandstone rock with a maximum cover thickness of 237 m. A geological fault is located near the overcrossing of Rennsteig road tunnel. The minimum track radius is 798 m (2,618 ft).

The tunnel was originally equipped with seven sets of warning bells. Corrosion due to the damp atmosphere required frequent repainting of metal parts.

In order to allow drainage, the tunnel rises from both ends towards the middle at an inclination of 1% on its eastern side and 0.2% on the western end. Smoke from steam locomotives therefore tends to accumulate in the tunnel, so that it was referred to as the "forecourt to hell" by railwaymen. Therefore, Deutsche Reichsbahn used its locomotives of class 44 that were converted to coal-dust firing on this line because this type of firing could be switched off during tunnel passages. Nevertheless, Brandleite Tunnel is still traveled by steam locomotive comparatively often, since Meiningen Steam Locomotive Works is close, and the scenic line is popular with operators of excursion trains.

For firefighting purposes in the tunnel, Zella-Mehlis fire department keeps a special fire engine of type HLF 24/14-S. Before the tunnel was rehabilitated, tank wagons and flat wagons that could carry fire engines were kept at hand in the neighbouring stations, also a departmental vehicle with a 250 kg dry powder fire extinguisher was stationed in Oberhof as a first response measure.

There is no connection to the Rennsteig road tunnel.

== Bibliography ==
- Jens Weiske (1999). Vom Bau des Brandleitetunnels und des Rennsteigtunnels. Zella-Mehlis: Heinrich Jung. ISBN 3-930588-50-1.
- Horst Bernard; Annerose Kirchner; Jens Weiske; Heinrich Jung; Eduard Klett; Marie Schönemann; Anton Melichar & Ulrich Brunzel (1994). Der Bau des Brandleitetunnels. H. Jung Verlagsgesellschaft.
