= Falkenstein (Thuringia) =

Coordinates: 50°44′46″N 10°38′35″E

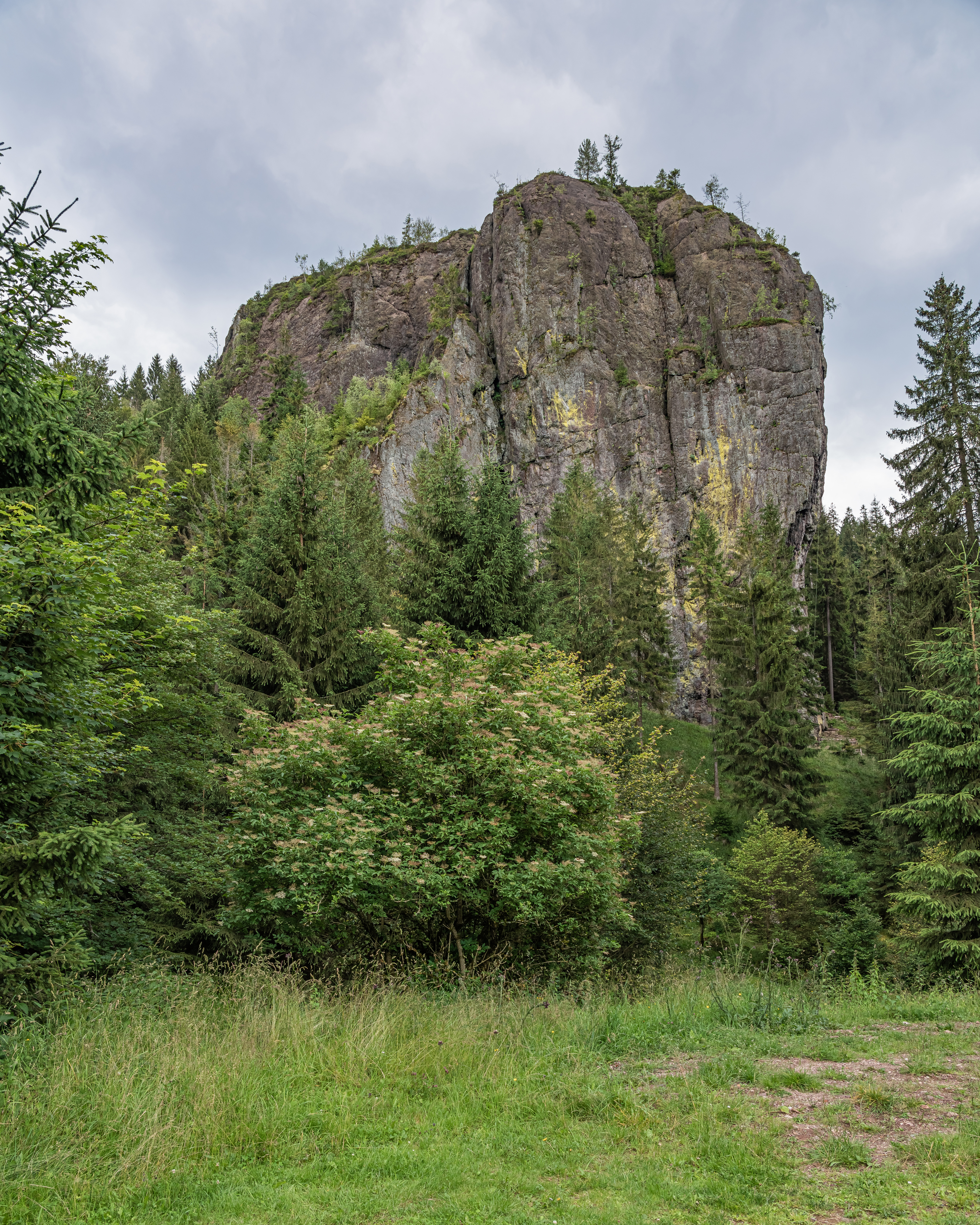
The Falkenstein in the Thuringian Forest

The Falkenstein (German pronunciation: [ˈfalkn̩ˌʃtaɪn]) lies southeast of the small town of Tambach-Dietharz in Schmalwasser bottom (Schmalwassergrund) and is the most important rock formation in the Thuringian Forest in central Germany. It consists of porphyry (rhyolite and andesite). On the valley side, the crags are 96 metres (315 ft) high. Because of its situation on the side of a hill (the uphill side has a height of about 25 metres (82 ft)), it appears most striking when one stands immediately in front of it.

The area near the Rennsteig climbing path has a very montane climate due to its height. The Falkenstein was first climbed in 1852 by the Tambach glassmaker, Jacob Zimmermann. Since then, it has become a rock climbing site with climbing routes of varying grades. The rock is best reached on foot or bicycle by taking the road from Tambach-Dietharz (closed to traffic) that runs along the Schmalwassergrund past the Schmalwasser Reservoir - a distance of about 10 kilometres (6.2 mi). At the foot of the Falkenstein, there is a mountain rescue hut.

== Sources ==
- Zimmermann, W. et al. (1990). Thüringer Wald. Kleiner Naturführer. = Gothaer Museumsheft - Abhandlungen und Berichte des Museums der Natur Gotha, Lfd. No. 9, Gotha, ISSN 0138-1857
