= Ohra Dam =

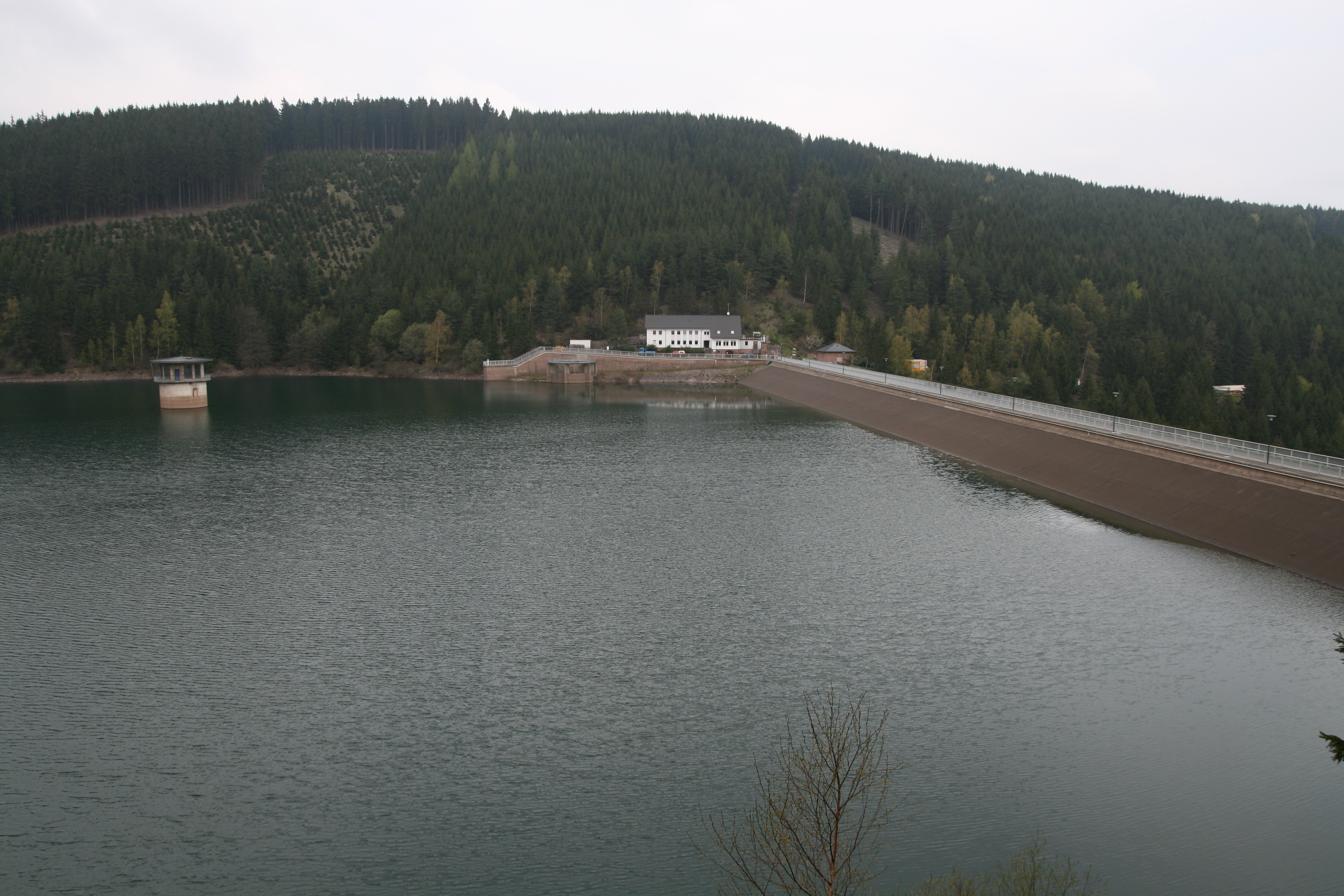
- Interactive map of Ohra Dam
- Location: Landkreis Gotha
- Coordinates: 50.7652°N 10.7206°E
- Construction began: 1960–1966

Dam and spillways
- Impounds: Ohra, Kernwasser
- Height (foundation): 59 m
- Height (thalweg): 55 m
- Length: 260 m (850 ft)
- Elevation at crest: 528.00 m
- Width (crest): 6 m
- Dam volume: 950,000 m³

Reservoir
- Total capacity: 18.4 M m³
- Active capacity: 17.5 M m³
- Catchment area: 67.4 km^{2} (33 via diversion channel)
- Surface area: 82 ha
- Normal elevation: 525.00 m

Power Station
- Installed capacity: 400 kW

The Ohra Dam (German: Ohra-Talsperre orTalsperre Ohra) is a dam which impounds the Ohra in the German state of Thuringia. It lies on the northern side of the Thuringian Forest in the county of Gotha near the village of Luisenthal.

== Description ==
The Ohra Reservoir is mainly used to store drinking water and supplies over 400,000 inhabitant in Central Thuringia. Its storage volumen is around 18 million m³. The reservoir has retained a near-natural character. In the course of the construction of the dam, 20 homes, a saw mill and the old boiler smithy of the village of Schwarzwald were demolished and the road to Oberhof re-routed. The country pub, "Untere Schweizerhütte" had to close due to its location within the reservoir catchment and was also torn down.

== Structures ==
The barrier is a straight rock-filled dam with a concrete-slab face. In the period leading up to the year 2000, a general maintenance programme was carried out on the dam and its inlet structure.

The water treatment plant is located just below the dam. As well as supplying drinking water, electricity is also generated. The hydropower station is a circular shaft to the side of the dam. The reservoir has two forebays for preclearing called the Kerngrund and Silbergrund. Their dams have heights of 14.5 and 12 metres respectively.

The inflow to the reservoir is ensured through the use of tunnels diverting water from the Zahme Gera and Schmalwasser.

== Literature ==
- Talsperren in Thüringen. Thüringer Talsperrenverwaltung, Autorenkollegium 1993

== See also ==
- List of dams in Germany
