= Rot (Apfelstädt) =

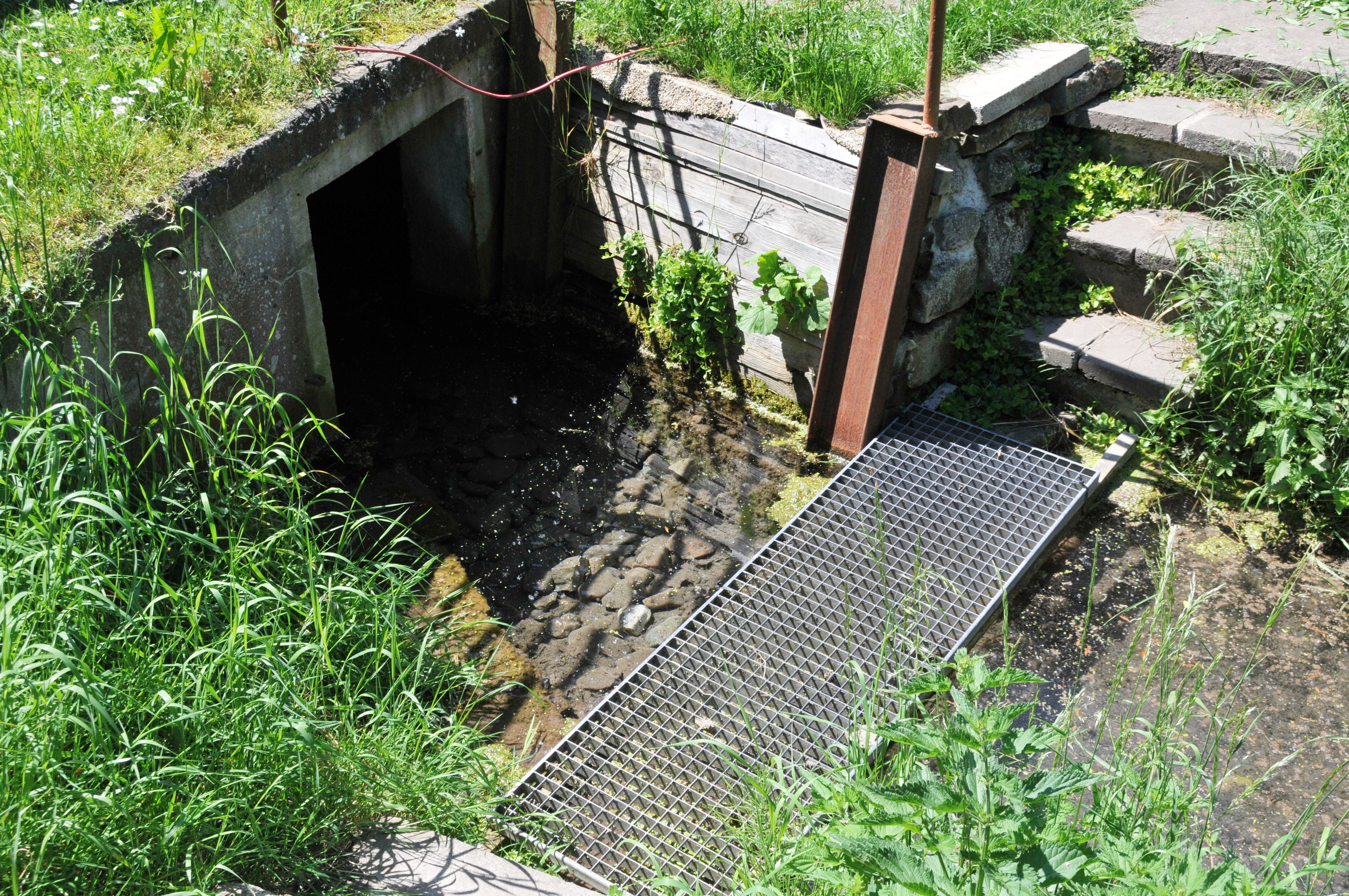

Location
- Country: Germany
- State: Thuringia

Physical characteristics
- Source
  - location: near the district Siebleben of Gotha
  - coordinates: 50.9387°N 10.7341°E
- Mouth
  - location: East of Wandersleben into the Apfelstädt
  - coordinates: 50.9009°N 10.8610°E

Basin features
- Progression: Apfelstädt→ Gera→ Unstrut→ Saale→ Elbe→ North Sea

Rot (German pronunciation: [ʁoːt]; in its upper course Roth) is a river of Thuringia, Germany.

The Rot springs near the district Siebleben of Gotha. It is a left tributary of the Apfelstädt in Wandersleben.

== See also ==
- List of rivers of Thuringia
