= Lauter (Hasel) =

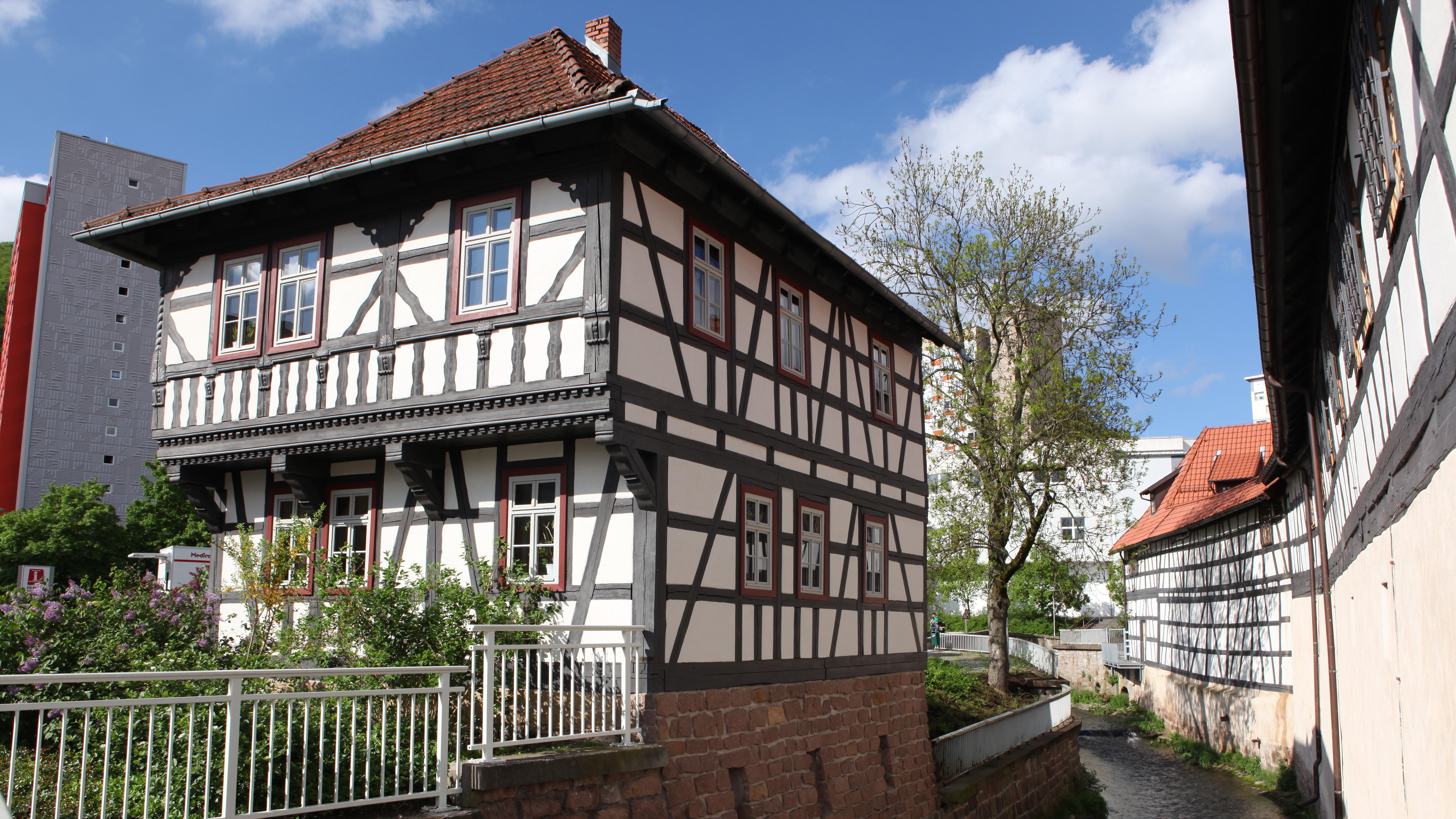

Location
- Country: Germany
- States: Thuringia

Physical characteristics
- Mouth
  - location: Hasel
  - coordinates: 50.6038°N 10.6730°E

Basin features
- Progression: Hasel→ Werra→ Weser→ North Sea

Lauter (German pronunciation: [ˈlaʊtɐ]) is a river of Thuringia, Germany. It flows into the Hasel in Suhl.

== See also ==
- List of rivers of Thuringia
