= Apfelstädt (river) =

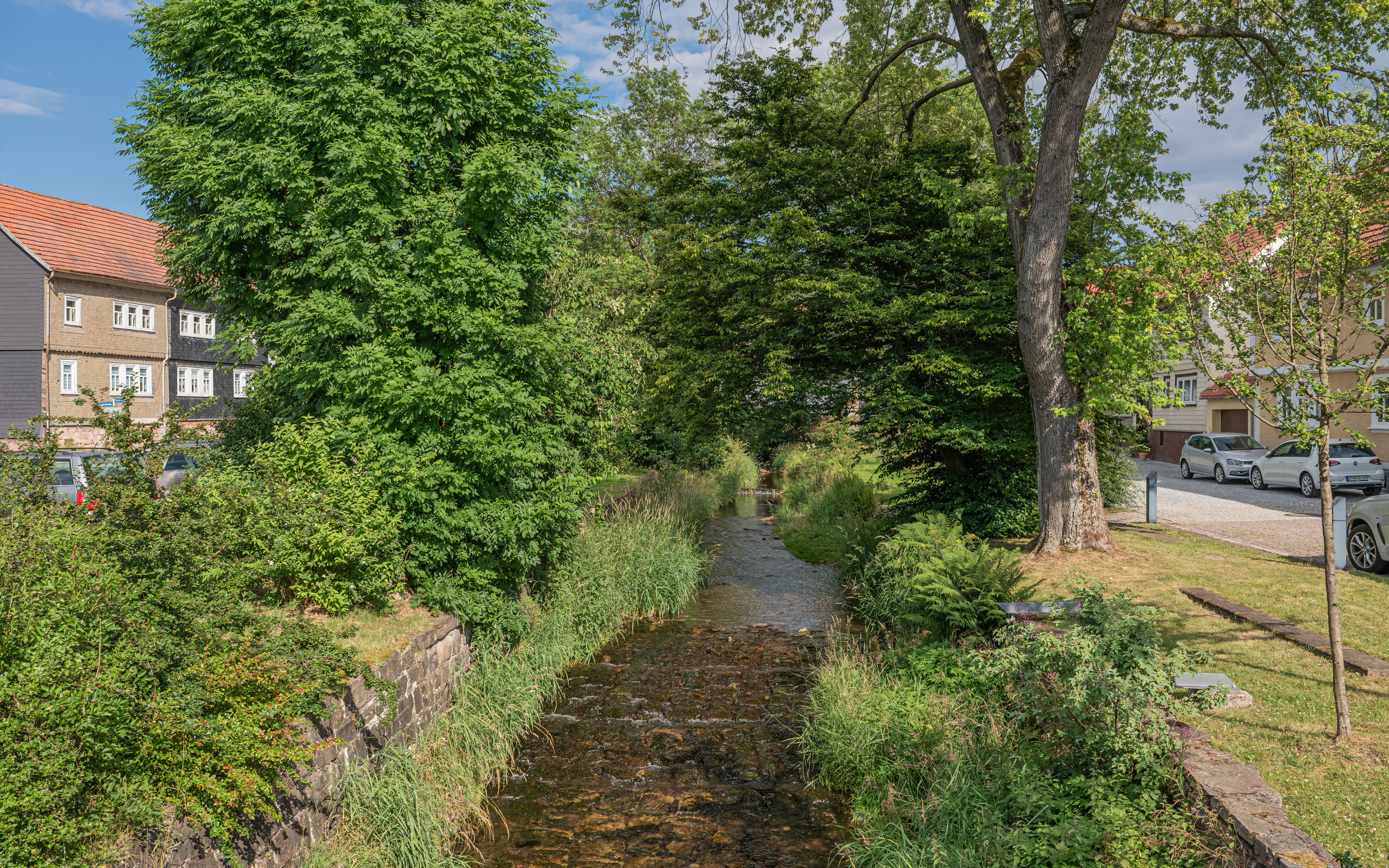

Location
- Country: Germany
- State: Thuringia

Physical characteristics
- Mouth
  - location: Gera
  - coordinates: 50.9213°N 10.9639°E
- Length: 34 km
- Basin size: 372.2 km²

Basin features
- Progression: Gera→ Unstrut→ Saale→ Elbe→ North Sea

The Apfelstädt (German pronunciation: [ˈapfl̩ʃtɛt]) is a river which flows for 34 km through Thuringia, Germany.

== Geography ==
The source of the Apfelstädt is around 5 km south-west of Tambach-Dietharz at an elevation of 728 m. The Apfelstädt marks the western boundary of the Elbe river system in the Thuringian Forest. Its main tributary is the Ohra, which joins it just north of Ohrdruf. The river flows into the Gera close to the town of Ingersleben.

Near Ohrdruf, the Apfelstädt flows through a German army training area. Here it is used for training in overcoming water obstacles.

== See also ==
- List of rivers of Thuringia
