= Tambach-Dietharz =

- Town
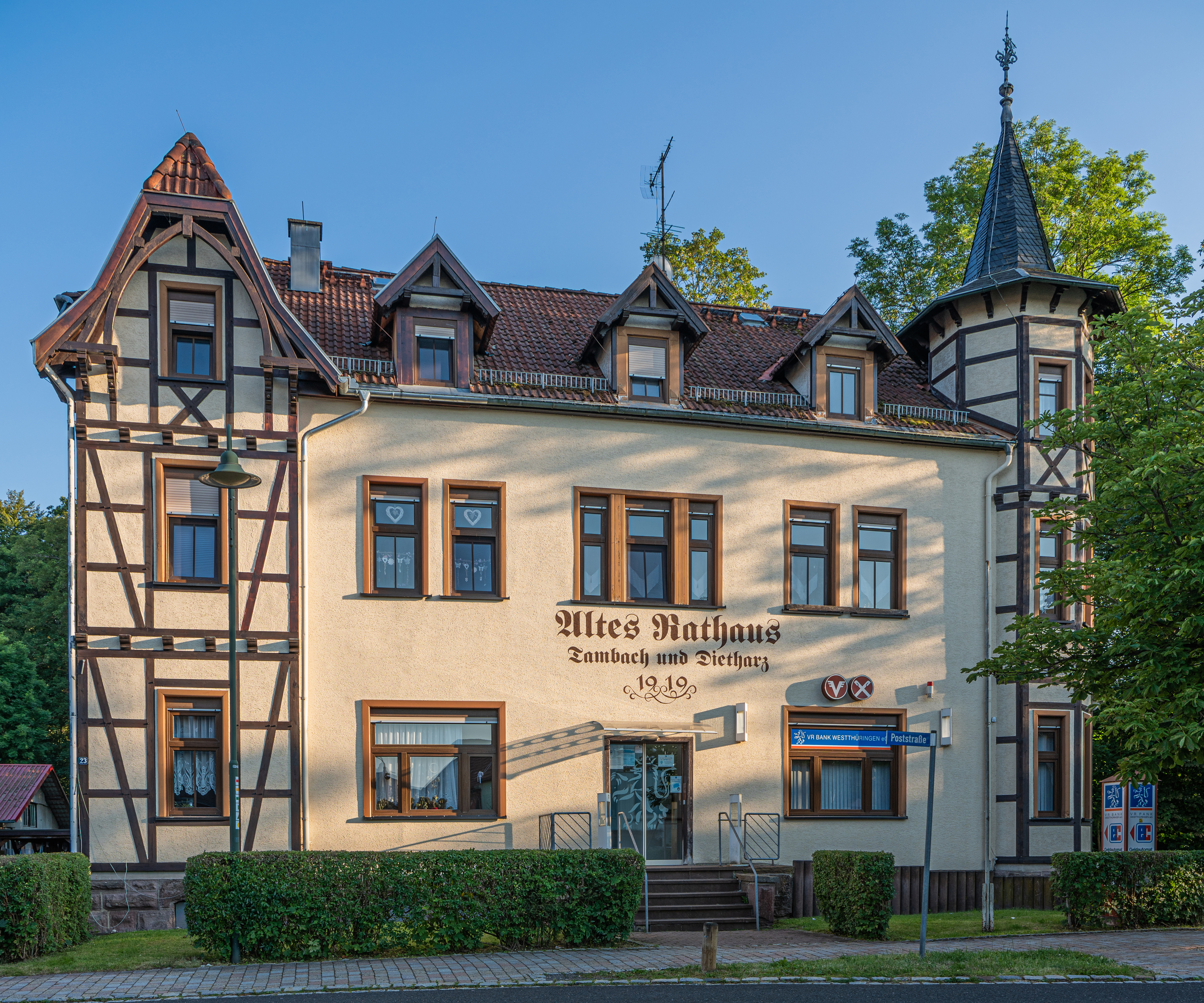
- Old town hall

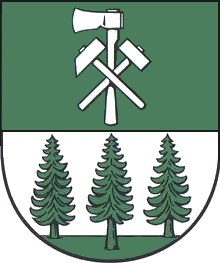
- Coat of arms

- Location of Tambach-Dietharz within Gotha district
- Interactive map of Tambach-Dietharz
- Location within Germany Location within Thuringia
- Coordinates: 50°47′23″N 10°37′0″E
- Country: Germany
- State: Thuringia
- District: Gotha

Government
  - Mayor (2024–30): Marco Schütz (Ind.)

Area
  - Total: 41.63 km^{2} (16.07 sq mi)
- Elevation: 450 m (1,480 ft)

Population (2025-12-31)
  - Total: 4,474
  - Density: 107.5/km^{2} (278.3/sq mi)
- Time zone: UTC+01:00 (CET)
  - Summer (DST): UTC+02:00 (CEST)
- Postal codes: 99897
- Dialling codes: 036252
- Vehicle registration: GTH
- Website: www.tambach-dietharz.de

Tambach-Dietharz (German pronunciation: [ˈtambax ˈdiːtˌhaːɐ̯ts]) is a town in the district of Gotha, in Thuringia, Germany. It is situated in the Thuringian Forest, 19 km south of Gotha.

== Mayor ==
Since 2012, Marco Schütz (independent) is the mayor. His predecessor was the former lieutenant from the German Army (Bundeswehr) Harald Wrona (FDP).

== Places of interest ==
- The Falkenstein is a 96 m high, free standing porphyry rock. It is a natural monument and hiking destination. The mountain rescue hut at its foot is managed.
- The route from Schmalkalden to Tambach-Dietharz is signposted as Martin-Luther-Weg and is a walking route.
- In the autumn of 1989, a monument to the Swiss Theologian, and protagonist of the Bekennenden Kirche, Karl Barth was raised in front of the Haus Tannenberg. Barth gave his "Tambacher Rede" speech, that introduced a new positioning of protestant Christianity in the 20th century, in this house in 1919.

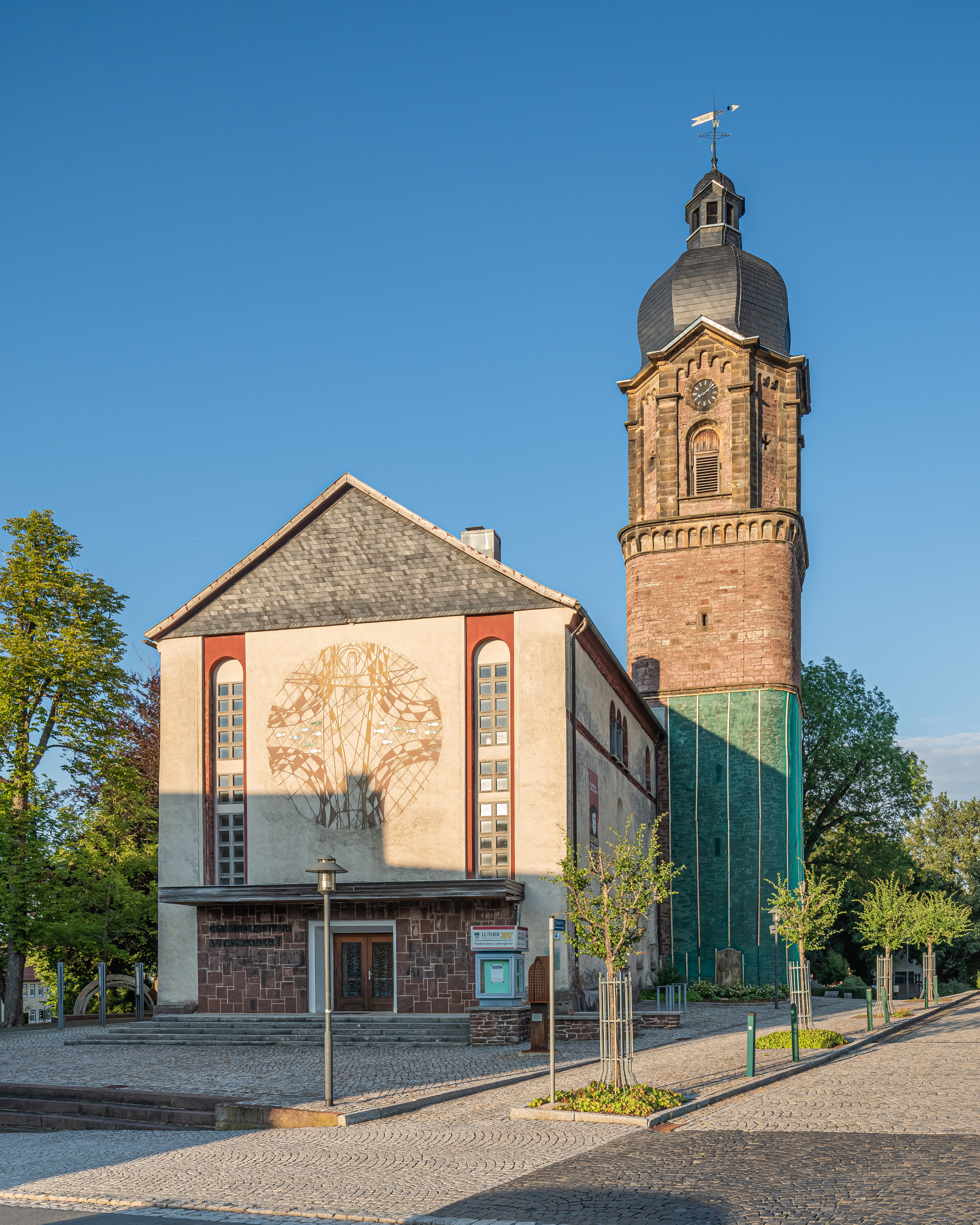
Lutherkirche

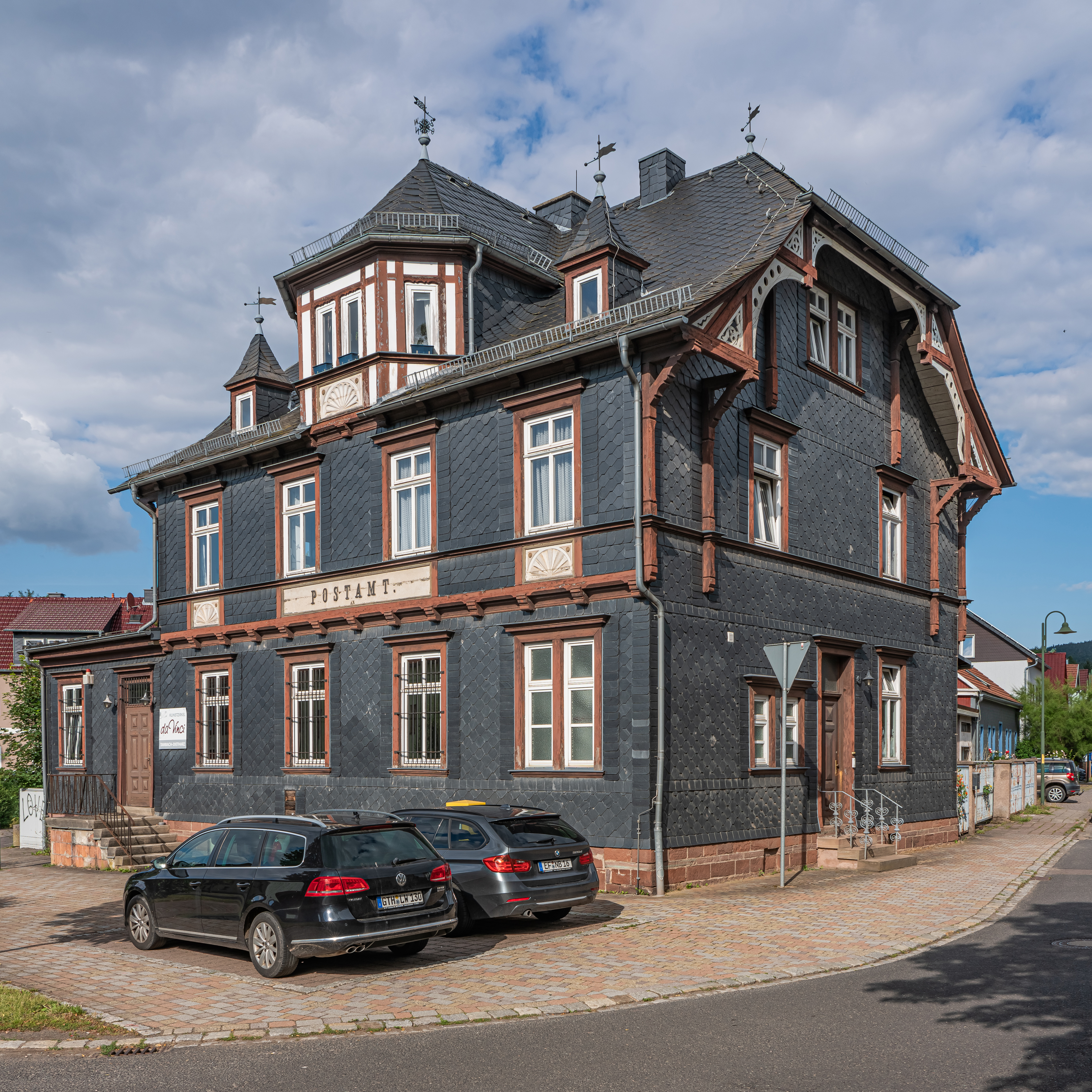
Old post office

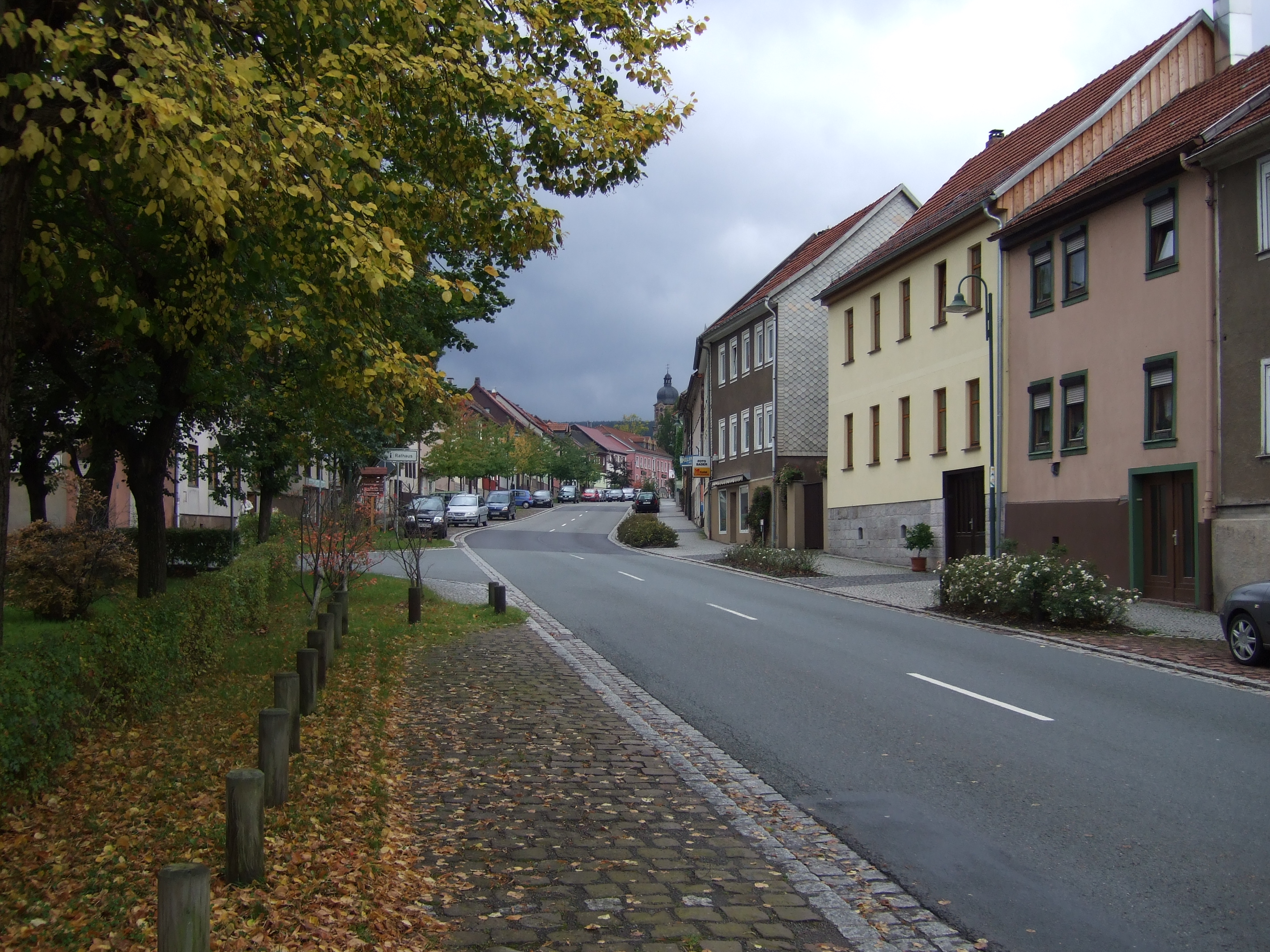
View along street Hauptstrasse to Lutherkirche

== Notable people ==
- Meister Eckhart (born about 1260; died before April 30, 1328), theologian, mystic and philosopher
- Karl-Heinz Menz (born 1949), biathlete
- Matthias Jacob (born 1960), biathlete
- Erich Recknagel (1904–1973), ski jumper, participant in the Olympic Winter Games in 1928
- Eisregen (formed 1995), death metal band, all original members came from Tambach-Dietharz
