= Ohra =

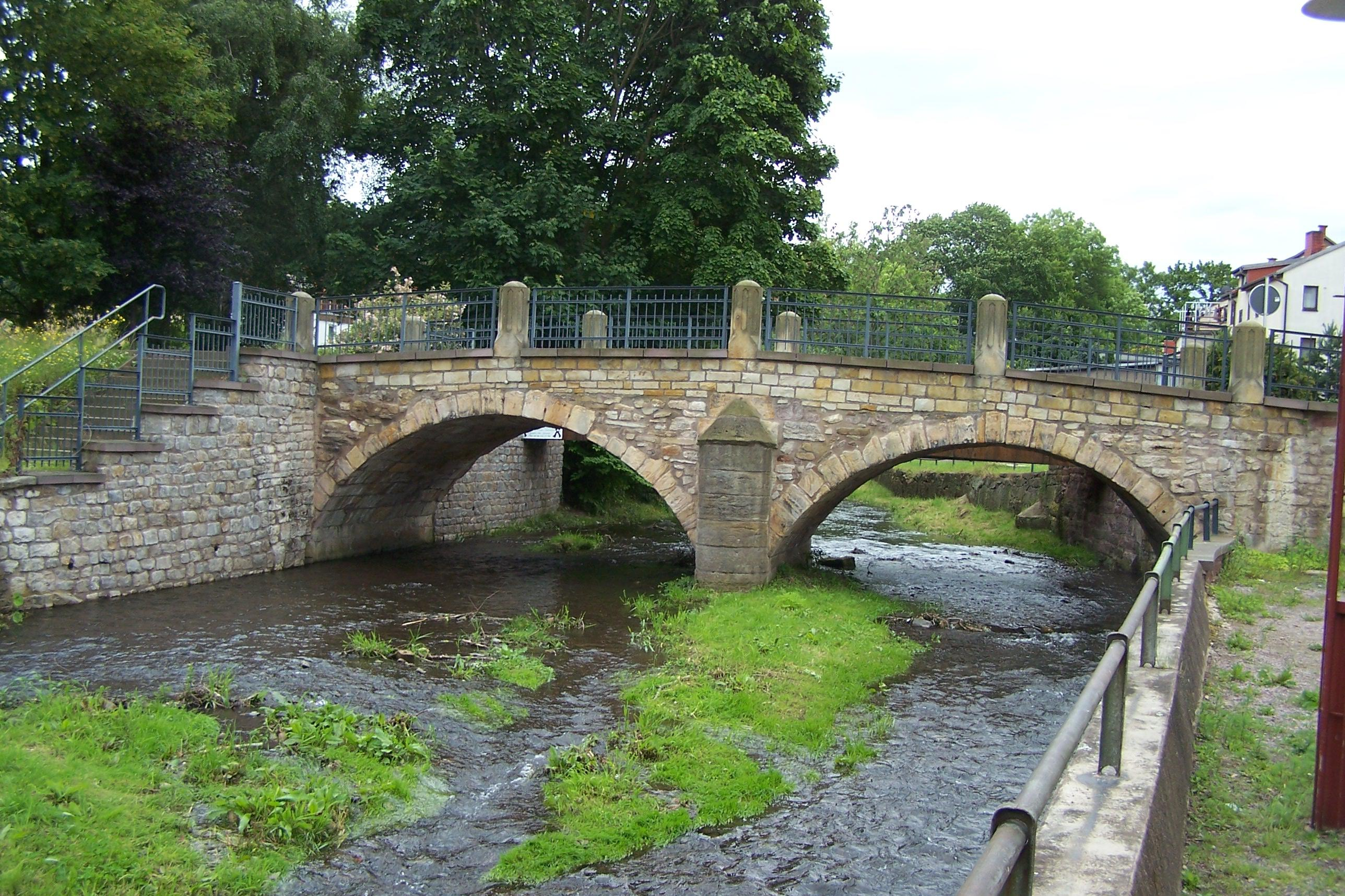
- The bridge in Ohrdruf over the Ohra river

Location
- Country: Germany
- States: Thuringia

Physical characteristics
- Mouth
  - location: Apfelstädt
  - coordinates: 50.8582°N 10.7274°E
- Length: 20 km (12 mi)

Basin features
- Progression: Apfelstädt→ Gera→ Unstrut→ Saale→ Elbe→ North Sea

The Ohra (German pronunciation: [ˈoːʁa]) is a river of Thuringia, Germany. It flows into the Apfelstädt near Hohenkirchen.

The Ohra Dam impounds the Ohra. The dam lies on the northern side of the Thuringian Forest in the district of Gotha near the village of Luisenthal.

== See also ==
- Ohra Dam
- List of rivers of Thuringia
