= Schwarza (Hasel) =

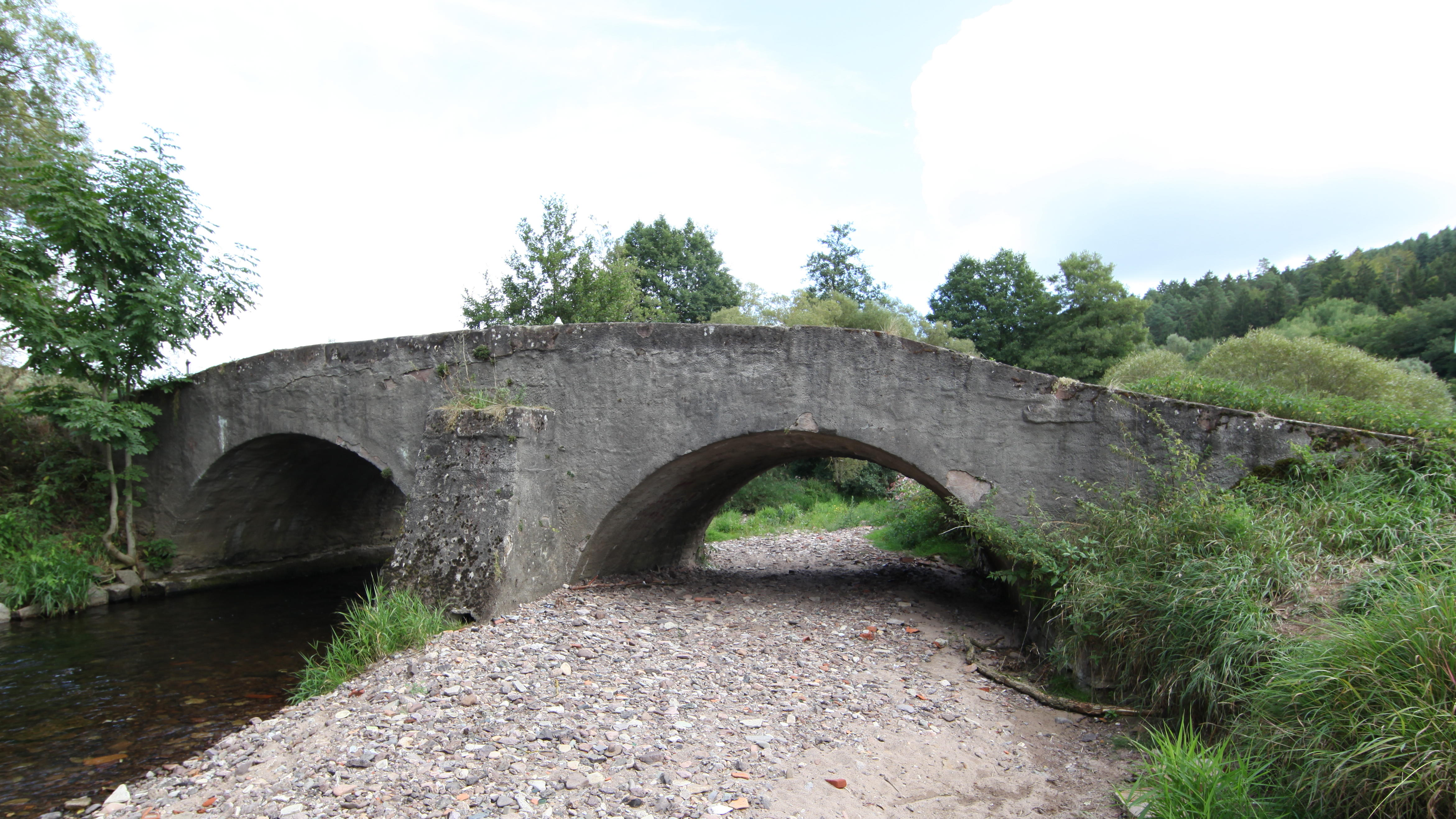
- Road bridge over the Schwarza at Schwarza

Location
- Country: Germany
- State: Thuringia

Physical characteristics
- Source
  - elevation: 795 m (2,608 ft)
- Mouth
  - location: Hasel
  - coordinates: 50.5705°N 10.5094°E
  - elevation: 322 m (1,056 ft)
- Length: 30 km (19 mi)
- Basin size: 173.3 km^{2} (66.9 sq mi)

Basin features
- Progression: Hasel→ Werra→ Weser→ North Sea

Schwarza (German pronunciation: [ˈʃvaʁtsa]) is a river of Thuringia, Germany. It flows into the Hasel in Rohr. In its uppermost course it is called Haselbach, in its middle course Schönau.

== See also ==
- List of rivers of Thuringia
