= Hasel (Werra) =

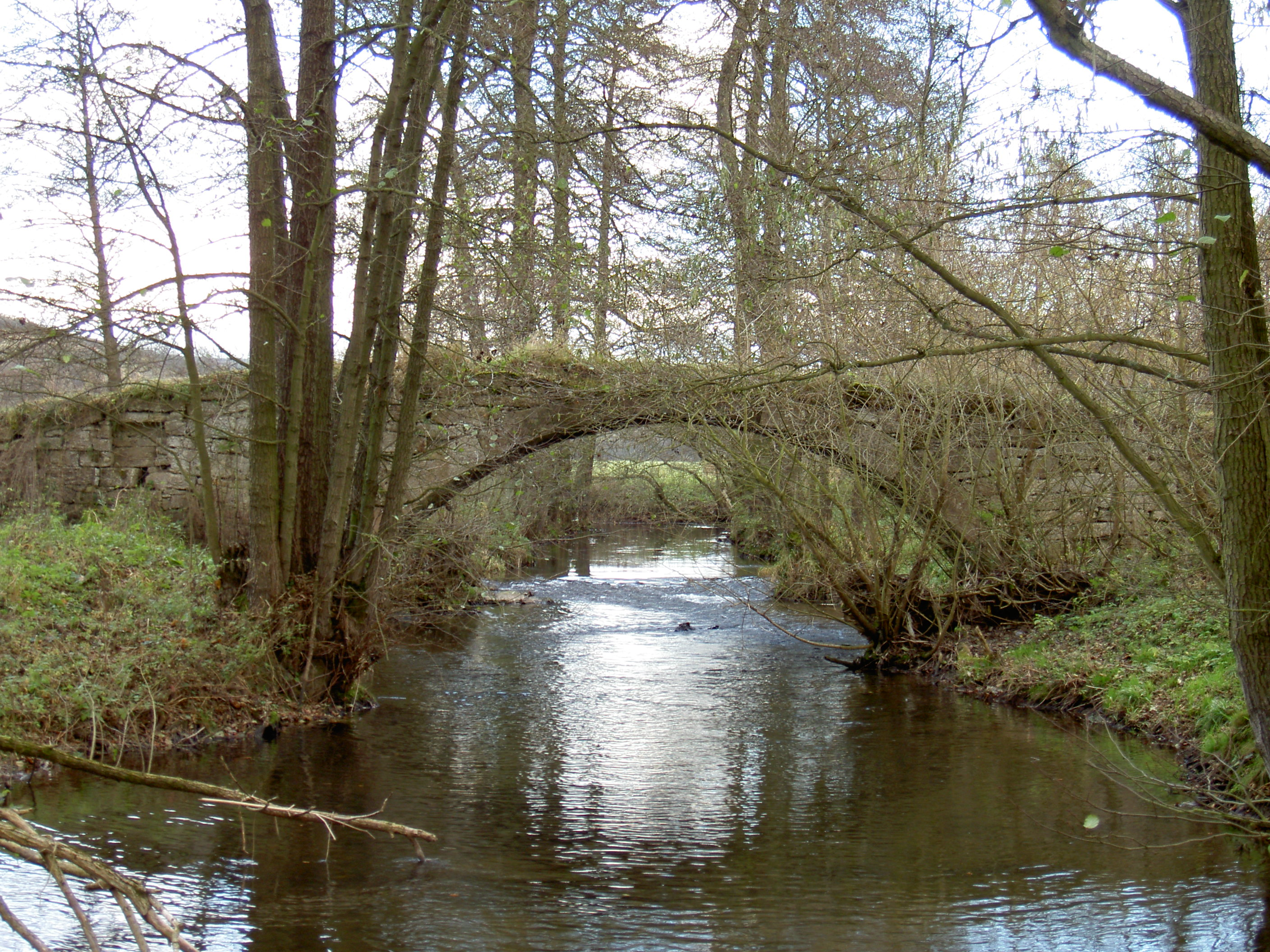

Location
- Country: Germany
- States: Thuringia

Physical characteristics
- Mouth
  - location: Werra
  - coordinates: 50.5257°N 10.4550°E

Basin features
- Progression: Werra→ Weser→ North Sea

Hasel (German pronunciation: [ˈhaːzl̩]) is a river of Thuringia, Germany. It flows into the Werra in Einhausen.

== See also ==
- List of rivers of Thuringia
