= Mittleres Nessetal =

Municipal association in Thuringia, Germany

Coordinates: 51.000°N 10.650°E

Mittleres Nessetal is a former Verwaltungsgemeinschaft ("collective municipality") in the district of Gotha, in Thuringia, Germany. The seat of the Verwaltungsgemeinschaft was in Goldbach. It was disbanded in January 2019, when 11 of its 12 municipalities were merged into the new municipality Nessetal.

The Verwaltungsgemeinschaft Mittleres Nessetal consisted of the following municipalities:

1. Ballstädt
2. Brüheim
3. Bufleben
4. Friedrichswerth
5. Goldbach
6. Haina
7. Hochheim
8. Remstädt
9. Sonneborn
10. Wangenheim
11. Warza
12. Westhausen
