= Hochheim, Thuringia =

Hochheim
- Ortschaft of Nessetal
- Interactive map of Hochheim
- Location within Germany Location within Thuringia
- Coordinates: 51°1′1″N 10°39′33″E
- Country: Germany
- State: Thuringia
- District: Gotha
- Municipality: Nessetal

Area
  - Total: 7.67 km^{2} (2.96 sq mi)
- Elevation: 277 m (909 ft)

Population (2017-12-31)
  - Total: 446
  - Density: 58.1/km^{2} (151/sq mi)
- Time zone: UTC+01:00 (CET)
  - Summer (DST): UTC+02:00 (CEST)
- Postal codes: 99869
- Dialling codes: 036255
- Vehicle registration: GTH

Hochheim (German pronunciation: [ˈhoːxhaɪm]) is a village and Ortschaft of the municipality Nessetal in the district of Gotha, in Thuringia, Germany. Before 1 January 2019, when it was merged into the new municipality Nessetal, it was an independent municipality.

It is the probable birthplace of the famous theologian Meister Eckhart.

== Geography ==
Hochheim is located in fertile Nesse valley in the northern part of the Gotha Land, in the triangle formed by the cities and towns of Gotha, Bad Langensalza and Erfurt. The settlement is close to the B247 federal highway on the southern foothills of the Hainich and lies at around 269 to 290 metres above sea level (NN). The neighbouring towns are Goldbach to the south, Westhausen to the east, Wangenheim to the west and Wiegleben to the north.

To the north of the town, meadows and fields run up to the woodland of the Wiegleber Holz and one of the largest wind farms in Thuringia. The northern Hochheimer Flur is also part of the watershed of the rivers Elbe and Weser. In the damp lowlands on the southern edge of the town, the Nesse (the largest tributary of the Hörsel) flows westwards. Here, in the 15th century, monks built an artificial mill race alongside the knight's mill (Rittermühle). On the western border of Wangenheim lies the Tiefenbornsteich pond (51.0151°N 10.6417°E) and a larger area of marsh, which is historically significant.

== History ==
=== Early history ===
Hochheim, sometimes also called “Loh-Hochheim”, was first mentioned in a donation deed to the Diocese of Fulda in 778.

Near the Tiefenbornsteich, the remains of the a settlement of the Linear Pottery Culture were uncovered in several places during exploratory excavations in the Hochheimer Flur and the nearby Seefeldsiedlung near Wangenheim. Archaeologists also made the oldest gold find in Thuringia here. A Roman settlement at Tiefenbornsteich has also been archaeologically uncovered.

After the acquisition of the Diocese of Fulda by the lords of Wangenheim, Hochheim belonged to the Wangenheim jurisdiction in the Duchy of Saxe-Gotha-Altenburg or Duchy of Saxe-Coburg-Gotha until the abolition of the patrimonial courts in the mid-19th century. The lords of Wangenheim and von Uechtritz had properties in the town.

Hochheim also had a larger castle and two manorial estates (Rittergüte), one of which has survived. Only the foundations of the former castle remain, which are covered by new buildings. Documentary records report that as early as the 16th century, grain ships of the Diocese of Fulda sailed up to the upper reaches of the Nesse near Wangenheim and Haina to collect the grain tributes from upland settlements such as Hochheim.

=== Recent history ===
Hochheim was handed over to US troops in April 1945 without any major combat operations. After the Soviet occupiers took over, the war memorial was moved to what is now the cemetery area to protect it from demolition. After the end of the Second World War, numerous refugees from the German eastern regions of Silesia, Pomerania, the Sudetenland and East Prussia came to Hochheim. The LPG "Freier Bauer" ("Free Farmers") and later the KAP Nessetal were founded on the old estates (Gutshöfen).

After the political change and the German reunification, the Goldbach agricultural cooperative took over the agricultural land and livestock. The structure of the village has been managed through the astute budgetary policy of the active mayors. For this purpose, the place was equipped with a modern sewerage system and all streets were renovated without the villagers having to pay for it. The community is now debt-free.

In 2015, St. Nicholas Church was re-inaugurated after a two-year renovation. Likewise, the former kindergarten was converted into a town hall, the school kitchen, fire station and sports field were renovated and a playground built.

On 1 January 2019, the formerly independent communities of Hochheim, Ballstädt, Bufleben, Friedrichswerth, Goldbach, Haina, Brüheim, Remstädt, Wangenheim, Warza and Westhausen merged to form the rural community of Nessetal (Nesse Valley). Hochheim was a member of the Verwaltungsgemeinschaft Mittleres Nessetal.

== Population growth ==
Growth of population (31 December):

- 1994 – 544
- 1995 – 545
- 1996 – 567
- 1997 – 567
- 1998 – 566
- 1999 – 562
- 2000 – 557
- 2001 – 548
- 2002 – 546
- 2003 – 538
- 2004 – 516
- 2005 – 508
- 2006 – 503
- 2007 – 488
- 2008 – 474
- 2009 – 480
- 2010 – 461
- 2011 – 476
- 2012 – 478
- 2013 – 463
- 2014 – 458
- 2015 – 456
- 2016 – 437
- 2017 – 446
