= Nesse =

Nesse may refer to:

- Nesse (Hörsel), a river in Thuringia, Germany, tributary to the Hörsel, 54.5 km long
- Nesse (Werra), a river in North Hessen, Germany, tributary to the Werra, 5.9 km long
- Nesse, Dornum, a village in Dornum municipality, Aurich District, in Lower Saxony, Germany
- Nesse, Loxstedt, a village in Loxstedt municipality, Cuxhaven District, in Lower Saxony, Germany
- Nesse Valley Railway, the rail line of the Gotha–Leinefelde railway between Gotha and Behringen in Thuringia, Germany

== People ==
- Nesse Godin (born 1928), Lithuanian American Holocaust survivor, who dedicated her adult life to teaching and sharing memories of the Holocaust
- Johannes Nesse (1891–1948), Norwegian newspaper editor
- Åse-Marie Nesse (1934–2001), Norwegian philologist, translator and poet
- Randolph M. Nesse (1948–), American physician and evolutionary biologist

== See also ==
- Mittleres Nessetal, a collective municipality in Gotha District, Thuringia, Germany
- Nesse-Apfelstädt, a municipality in Gotha District, Thuringia, Germany
- Nesseaue, a collective municipality in Gotha District, Thuringia, Germany
