= Wilder Graben (Nesse) =

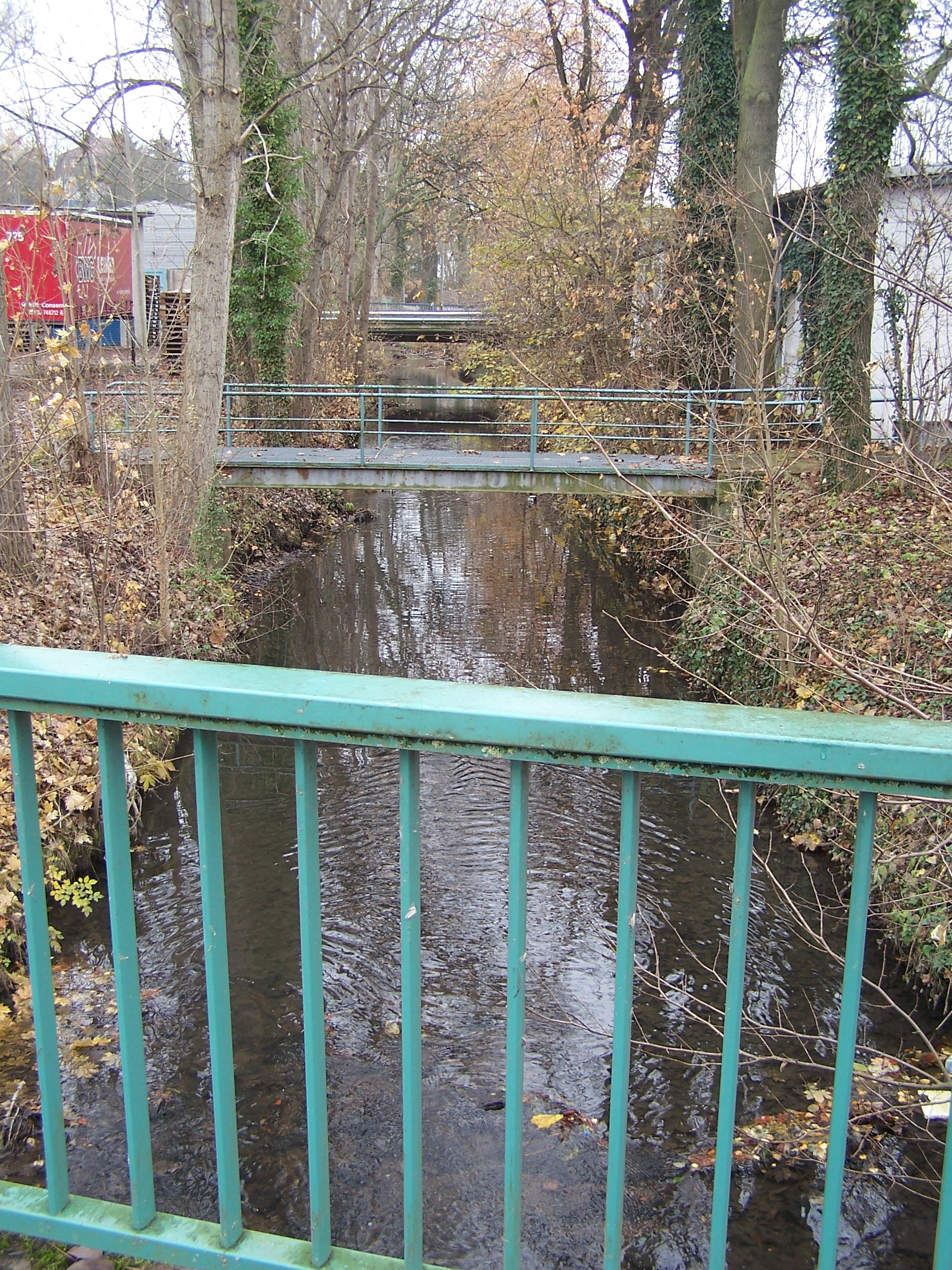

Location
- Country: Germany
- State: Thuringia

Physical characteristics
- Source
  - elevation: 324 m
- Mouth
  - location: Nesse
  - coordinates: 51.0099°N 10.6256°E
  - elevation: 258.7 m
- Length: 17.1 km (10.6 mi)
- Basin size: 104.6 km^{2}

Basin features
- Progression: Nesse→ Hörsel→ Werra→ Weser→ North Sea

The Wilde Graben, also called Flutgraben or Wilde Leina, is a left tributary of the Nesse in district of Gotha in Thuringia, the upper reaches of which runs through the town of Gotha. It is fed to no small extent by the Leina channel, which was already built in the Middle Ages and supplies it with water from the Thuringian Forest, which is branched off by bifurcation from the Hörsel upper reaches Leina as well as from the upper reaches of the Apfelstädt from the system Gera/Unstrut/Saale/Elbe. Its natural upper course is called Ratsrinne.

At 104.6 km², the catchment area of the Wilden Graben is hardly smaller than that of the Nesse above its mouth (131.4 km²), to which must be added the proportionate catchment area of Leina (estimated by TLUG Jena at 20.8 km²) and Apfelstädt. The length of the Nesse River over the upper Leina, Leinakanal and Wilden Graben is 63.5 km compared to 54.5 km and that of the Hörsel even 73.3 km compared to 55.2 km.

== Course ==
The Ratsrinne originates in the southwest of Gotha, immediately southwest of the district Sundhausen, at the former railway line, near the aqueduct of the Leina Canal. From here the brook first flows 5.3 km in east-north-eastern direction and drains a catchment area of about 20 km² via mainly right tributary brooks, until in the eastern south of the town centre the Flachsröste (Töpfleber Graben), which is only 2.5 km long but drains a good 10 km², flows to it from the southeast. From here the actual Wild Rift begins, which from now on turns canalized to the north and finally to the northwest and still in the core city area takes up the Leina Channel.

After passing Remstädt and Goldbach, the river finally flows into the Nesse after 17.1 kilometres of flowing distance south of Wangenheims,

== See also ==
- List of rivers of Thuringia
