= St. John's Church, Lüneburg =

St. Johannis
- St. John's Church
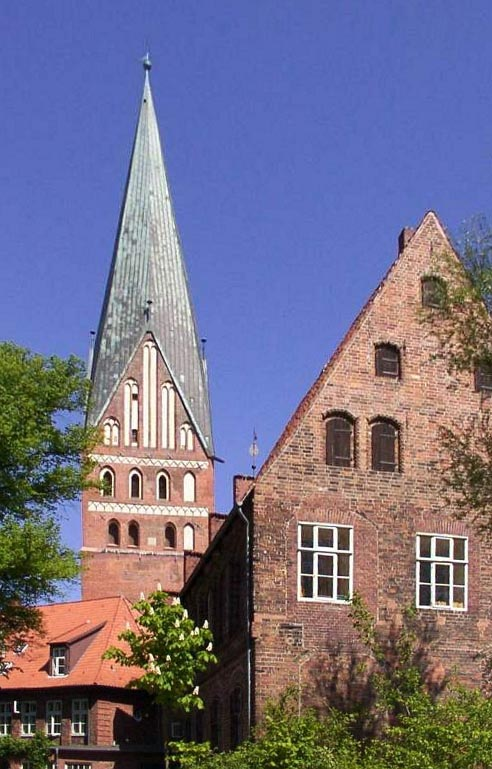
- The church with its slightly sloping steeple
- St. Johannis
- 53°14′52″N 10°24′46″E
- Location: Lüneburg, Lower Saxony
- Country: Germany
- Denomination: Lutheran
- Previous denomination: Catholic
- Website: www.sankt-michaelis.de

History
- Dedication: John the Baptist
- Consecrated: 1370

Architecture
- Style: Brick Gothic

The Church of John the Baptist (Germ. St. Johannis or Johanniskirche) is the oldest Lutheran church in Lüneburg, Germany. It is located in the city centre. Lüneburg is on the European Route of Brick Gothic and the church is an example of this style. With its 108-meter high spire, it is the second tallest church tower in Lower Saxony – after St. Andrew's in Hildesheim.

== History ==
The church, dedicated to John the Baptist, is considered an important example of northern German Brick Gothic architecture. The five-naved hall church was erected between 1300 and 1370 and repaired in 1420. In the early 15th century Conrad of Soltau, as Conrad III Prince-Bishop of Verden, failed to make St. John's the new cathedral of his see, since the city council and the Prince of Lüneburg resisted that, fearing the political interference of another power. The outer structure was marked by rebuilding in 1765. Particularly striking is the lightly sloping steeple, which at a height of 108 meters is the highest church steeple in Lower Saxony. The stained-glass in the Elisabeth Chapel was made by Charles Crodel in 1969.

The church is one of the attractions of the European Route of Brick Gothic.

== Organ ==
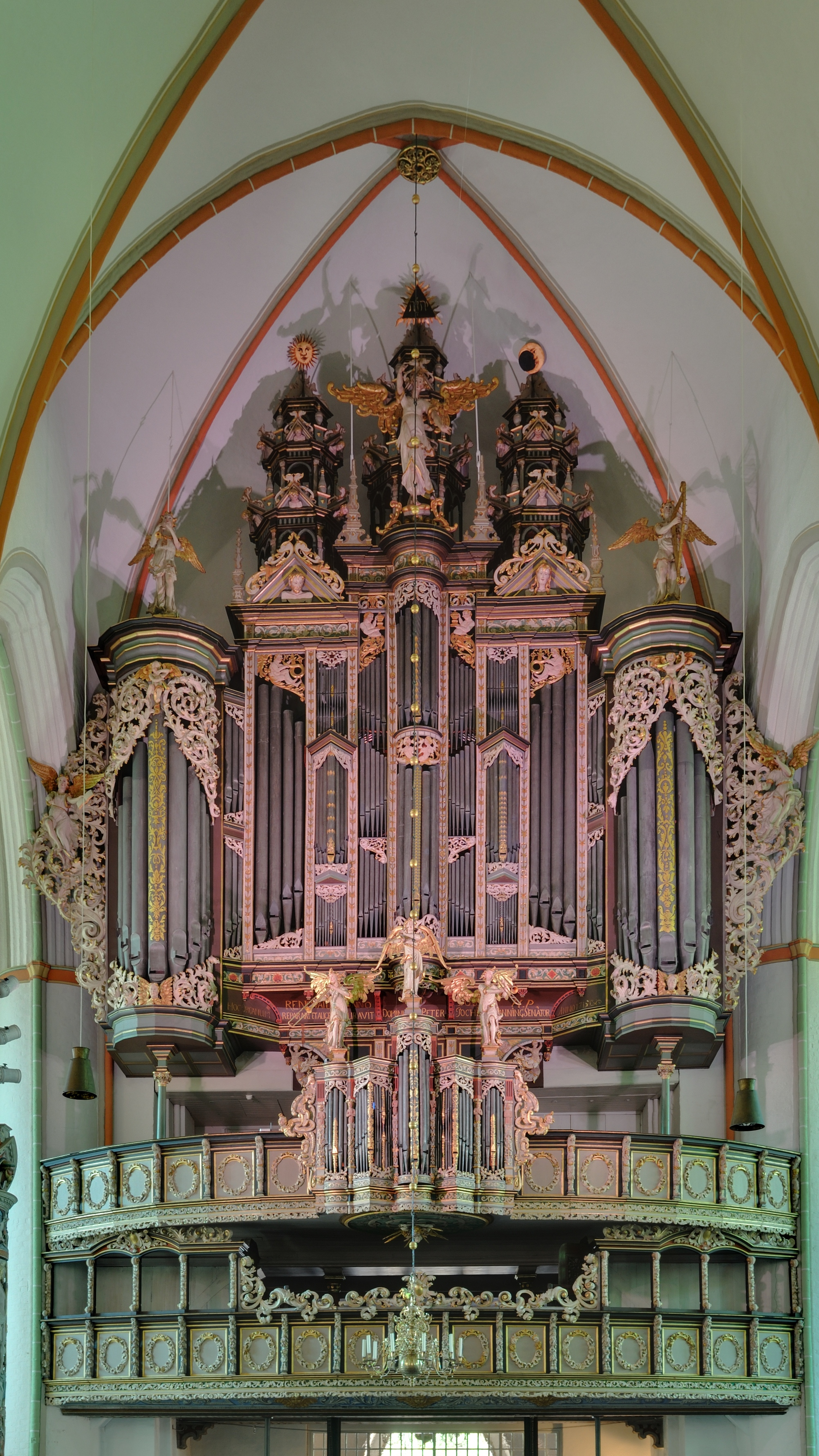
The baroque organ in the Johanniskirche

The church's organ was finished in 1553 by Hendrik Niehoff and Jasper Johansen and rebuilt in 1714 by Arp Schnitger student, Matthias Dropa and in the later 20th century by Rudolf von Beckerath. Among its noted organists were Christian Flor (1676–1697) and Georg Böhm (1698–1733).

As a young man, Johann Sebastian Bach was resident (1700–1702) at a school attached to the nearby Michaeliskirche, where he appears to have been a kind of organ scholar. Documentary evidence suggests, in the opinion of Bach scholar Christoph Wolff, that Böhm gave Bach organ lessons at St. Johannis.

The organ has been featured on BBC television in several programmes of "21st century Bach", a project in which John Scott Whiteley plays historic organs.

== Legend ==
The 108-meter-high spire of the church looks as though it is sloping from each side: the truss on the upper part is twisted into a corkscrew shape. A legend states that when the master builder noticed the mistake, he fell from an upper window in the church tower; however, he landed on a passing haywagon, so he lived. Feeling that he had been vindicated by God, the master went into a local tavern to celebrate. After a few too many drinks, he leaned back in his chair and fell over. As he fell, he hit his head on the stone hearth of the fireplace and was killed.

== See also ==
- List of tallest churches
