= Jasper Johannsen =

16th century German organ builder

Jasper Johannsen (fl. 1550) was a 16th-century German organ builder. Not much is known about him, but he is known to have built the famous ”Böhm organ” of St. John's Church, Lüneburg with Hendrik Niehoff, completed in 1553. The organ was later named after it prominent master, Georg Böhm, and was played by young J. S. Bach. Noted Bach scholar Christoph Wolff says Böhm gave the young Bach lessons here during Bach's residency (1700–1702) at the nearby Michaeliskirche.
