= House of Plague =

House in Gdańsk, Poland

House of Plague (Dom Zarazy)
- Gatehouse
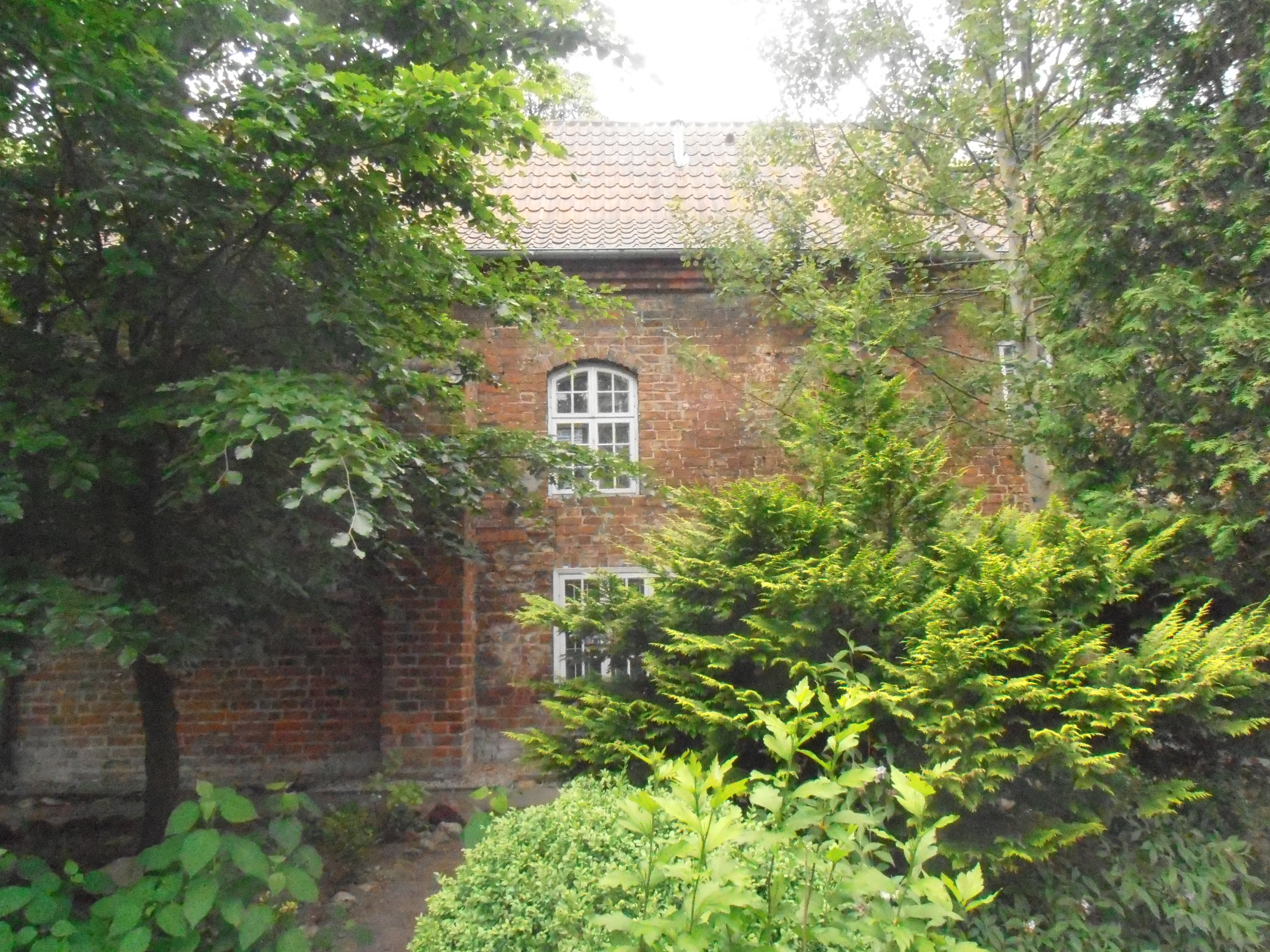
- House of Plague in Gdańsk (Dom Zarazy)

- Location within Poland Location within Pomeranian Voivodeship

General information
- Architectural style: Gothic
- Location: Gdańsk, Poland
- Coordinates: 54°24′32.90″N 18°33′20.77″E
- Completed: around 14th century

The House of Plague (Polish: Dom Zarazy) in Gdańsk-Oliwa, Poland is a monument located on the European Route of Brick Gothic.

Today's House of Plague was formerly known as the Gatehouse or the Great Gate. Built around the 14th century, it was considered a Gothic pearl and was the main entrance gate within the defensive chains that surrounded the local Cistercian abbey. The building housed the seat of the mayor of the monastery and a chapel. The gate serves a representative function―eminent guests, including Polish kings, used it to enter the abbey.

In 1709, an epidemic of plague struck Gdańsk, which killed half of the city. In the chapel of the Gatehouse, a quarantine and a church for the sick were improvised, and the infected were cared for by six servant monks―three volunteers and three randomly selected, with no survivors. To commemorate those events, the former Gatehouse was called the House of Plague and the chapel was called Plague Chapel.

In the 18th century, sundials were installed on the building. From 1804, it was the seat of the mayor of Oliwa. In 1836, the interior was rebuilt, removing, among others, chapel, adapting the building to the role of village councils and arranging two cells for criminals. The village council functioned until 1910. Later, the building was used for living purposes. In 1945 the House of Plague was partially burned―it was rebuilt in 1963 and four years later it was entered in the register of monuments; the headquarters of cultural organizations are also starting there.

In the years 2008–2021 the Teatr z Polski 6 (Theater from Poland 6) theater operated in the House of Plague, run by the actor and director Ryszard Jaśniewicz and his wife―Gabriela Pewińska-Jaśniewicz, and from 2002―the "Stara Oliwa" Association founded and led by architect Danuta Rolke-Poczman organizing between among other things plays, exhibitions and concerts. The association tried to promote the name "Neighbors’ House", but the traditional name still dominates everyday use.
