= Matthias Dropa =

German organ builder (died 1732)

- Born: 17th century Transylvania
- Died: 25 September 1732; Lüneburg
- Education: pupil of Arp Schnitger
- Occupation: Organ builder

Matthias Dropa (born between 1646 and 1665 – 25 September 1732) was a German organ builder. A pupil of Arp Schnitger, he built organs in Northern Germany, including St. Michaelis, Lüneburg.

== Career ==
Born in Transylvania, Dropa worked as an assistant of Arp Schnitger, probably between 1680 and 1692. He founded his own workshop in 1692 and achieved the citizenship of Hamburg on 18 November 1692. He built in 1696 three new organs in Bargteheide and Finkenwerder. From 1698 to 1700, he expanded the organ Cuxhaven-Altenbruch. He moved to Lüneburg in 1705, where he built a new organ at St. Michaelis, together with his assistant Gerhard von Holy. From 1712 to 1715, he expanded the organ of St. Johannis, supervised by Georg Böhm by a pedal. Dropa was the teacher of Erasmus Bielfeldt, whom he trained from 1707 to 1715. The organ builder Johann Matthias Hagelstein married his daughter Catharina Margaretha on 22 June 1734. Dropa died in Lüneburg.

== Works ==
Year	Location	Church	Image	Manuals	Stops	Notes
1696	Hamburg-Finkenwerder	St. Nikolai				not extant
1696	Bargteheide	Protestant church				only prospect extant
1698–1700	Cuxhaven-Altenbruch	St. Nicolai		II/P	28	renovation, five stops
1705–1708	Lüneburg	St. Michaelis		III/P	43	new, prospect and five stops extant
1708	Lüneburg	St. Lamberti		I	6	1801 to Camin, 1855 to church in Dreilützow
1712–1715	Lüneburg	St. Johannis		III/P	46	expansion

== Literature ==
- Gustav Fock: Arp Schnitger und seine Schule. Ein Beitrag zur Geschichte des Orgelbaues im Nord- und Ostseeküstengebiet. Bärenreiter, Kassel 1974, ISBN 3-7618-0261-7
