= Christian Flor =

German composer and organist

- Born: 1626; Neukirchen, Ostholstein
- Died: 28 September 1697 (aged 70–71); Neukirchen
- Occupations: Organist; Composer
- Organizations: St. Marien, Rendsburg; St. Johannis, Lüneburg; St. Michaelis, Lüneburg

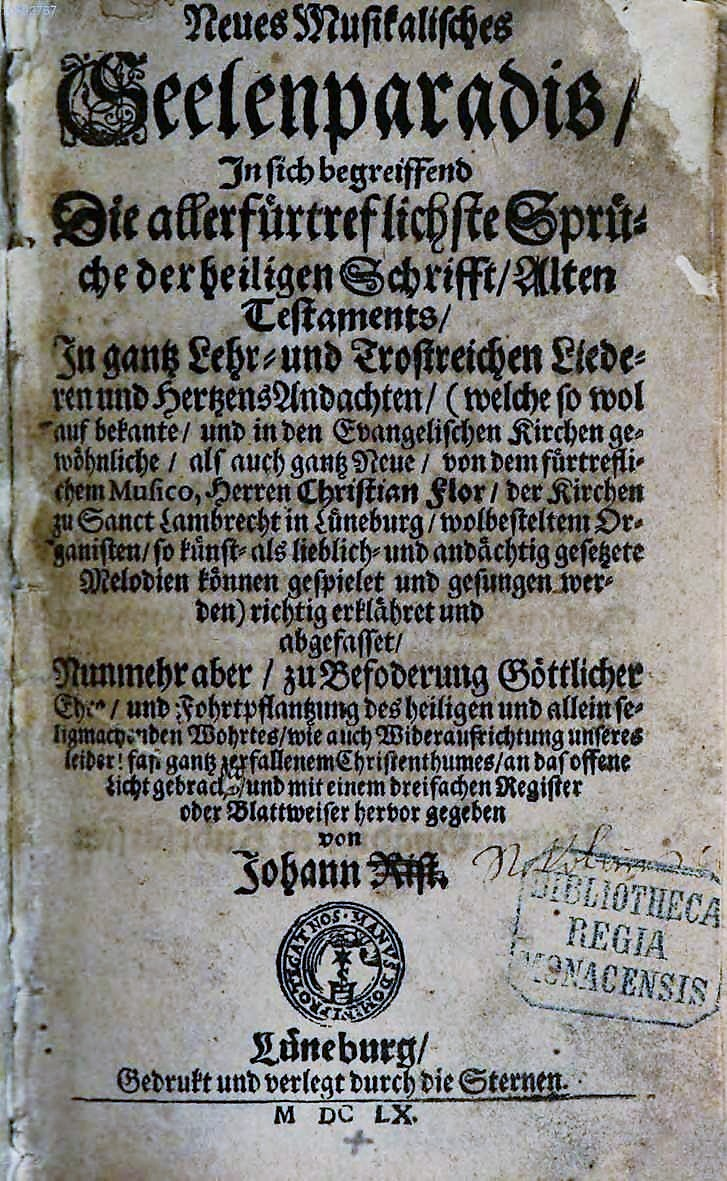
Title page of the 1660 collection Neues Musikalisches Seelenparadis

Christian Flor (1626 – 28 September 1697) was a German composer and organist. Working at churches in Rendsburg and Lüneburg, he was widely known for vocal and organ compositions. He composed one of the earliest Passion oratorios, in 1667.

== Life ==
Born in Neukirchen, Ostholstein, Flor came from a family of pastors spread throughout Schleswig-Holstein and was born as the son of the pastor Otto Flor and his wife Catharina. He probably received his musical education in Hamburg and Lübeck, studying with Heinrich Scheidemann and Franz Tunder. From 1652 he was organist at St. Marien in Rendsburg. In 1653 he married Margarethe Hudemann, the widow of his predecessor. Their daughter Catharina was baptised in Rendsburg on 24 October 1653. At the latest in 1654, he became organist at St. Lamberti in Lüneburg. After the death of his first wife he married Anna Dorothea Lange (1641–1685). From 1676 until his death, he was (as a predecessor of Georg Böhm) also organist at St. Johannis, the major church in Lüneburg.

Flor was widely known as an organist and organ expert. He contributed significantly to Lüneburg becoming one of the most important North German music centres of the time. Like their father, his son Johann Georg (1679–1728) worked as organist at St. Lamberti in Lüneburg, and his son Gottfried Philipp (1682–1723) from 1707 was organist at St. Michaelis, Lüneburg. Flor composed a St. Matthew Passion in 1667, which is one of the first passion oratorios in music history. He included chorales in the Passion. In addition to his few surviving organ works and independent harpsichord compositions, Flor also created several collections of occasional music and liturgical vocal works.

Flor died in Neukirchen near Eutin.

== Legacy ==
Johann Sebastian Bach probably became acquainted with compositions by Flor during his stay as a student in Lüneburg and was likely influenced by them. According to other sources, Bach is said to have known Flor personally and to have appreciated his compositions. His reputation is also supported by the fact that both Johann Gottfried Walther (1732) and Johann Mattheson wrote about him in their music encyclopaedias. The latter described him in his 1740 Grundlage einer Ehrenpforte as "berühmten Lüneburgischen Organisten" (famous Lüneburg organist).

== Work ==
Flor's works include:

- Passion oratorio, 1667
- Es ist gnug, Herr, kleines geistliches Konzert, Verlag C. Hofius Ammerbuch, 2007
- Machet die Tore weit, cantata (SATB, strings and b.c.), Edition Baroque Bremen
- Pastores currite in Bethlehem, cantata, Edition Baroque Bremen
- Es segne dich der Gott Israels, cantata, Edition Baroque Bremen
- Harpsichord works (could only be assigned to Flor in 1997), including
  - Wie schön leuchtet der Morgenstern (Online-Version; PDF; 76 KB)
  - Zehn Suiten für Clavier, edited by Jörg Jacobi, Edition Baroque Bremen 2006, ISMN-M-700266-05-9.
  - Dreizehn & Ein Choral, Edition Baroque Bremen.
- with Johann Rist: Neues Musikalisches Seelenparadis (Old Testament), 1660
- with Rist: Neues Musikalisches Seelenparadis (New Testament), 1662
- Das gläubige Senffkorn – 23 Lieder für Singstimme und Basso continuo nach Gedichten von Georg Heinrich Werbern, 1665 (Vocal works, vol. VIII), Edition Baroque Bremen.
- Organ works: 2 Prealudia und eine Fuge in d, Choralprelude: Ein feste Burg "für 2 Claviere", Auf Meinen Lieben Gott (With double inverted counterpoint)

The title page of the collection of settings of Biblical verses from the Old Testament bears the title:

Neues Musikalisches Seelenparadis, in Sich begreiffend Die allerfuertreflichste Sprueche der H. Schrifft, Alten Testaments, In Lehr- und Trostreichen Liedern, und HertzensAndachten (welche so wohl auf bekannte, und in den Evangelischen Kirchen gewoehnliche, Als auch gantz neue, von dem fuertrefflichen Musico, Herren Christian Flor, der Kirchen zu S. Lambrecht, in Lueneburg wolbestelte Organisten, so kuenst- als lieblich- und andaechtig gesetzte Melodien, koennen gespilet und gesungen werden) richtig erklaehret und abgefasset Nunmehr aber zu Befoderung Goettlicher Ehre und Fohrtpflantzung des heiligen und allein seligmachenden Wohrtes wie auf Wideraufrichtung unseres leider! fast gantz verfallenem Christenthumes an das offene Licht gebracht und mit einem dreifachen Register oder Blattweiser hervor gegeben von Johann Rist

The New Musical Souls' Paradise, Containing The most sublime passages of the Holy Scripture (Old Testament) in most learned, reliable and deeply-considered songs (which can be played and sung equally to the well-known and familiar Melodies used in the Evangelical churches, as also to the quite new, artistically-, pleasantly- and reverently-composed Melodies by that most admirable Musico, Herr Christian Flor, the well-established organist of the church of St Lambrecht in Lüneberg), correctly explained and arranged, Now brought into plain light for the promotion of the Honour of God and for the dissemination of the Holy Word (which alone makes us blessed), as for the re-edification of our sadly wellnigh utterly fragmented Christendom, and supplied with a threefold register or page-index, by – Johann Rist...

== Recordings ==
- Nicolaus Bruhns: Complete Organ Works, including Christian Flor: Chorale preludes, Sven-Ingvart Mikkelsen at the Havgaard Rasmussen Organs in Eckernförde and Husum (Kontrapunkt 32198)
- G. A. Pandolfi Mealli: Violin Sonatas (1660) and Harpsichord Suites by Christian Flor, with Andrew Manze (violin) (CCS 5894)
- Dansk Orgelmusik i 400 år, including chorale prelude on "Ein feste Burg ist unser Gott" and Suite in D, Mikkelsen, 3-CD-CLASSCD528-30
- Organ Landscape: Holstein-Lübeck, including Flor's "Ein feste Burg", Wolfgang Baumgratz (organ), MDG – 319 0962(CD)
- Musicalische Frühlings-Früchte by anonymus, Dietrich Becker, Christian Flor (harpsichord suites, Hochzeitlicher Freuden-Klang) – Musica Poetica, Jörn Boysen (Challenge Classics)
