= Westhausen =

Westhausen can refer to the following places in Germany:

- Westhausen (Ostalb), in the Ostalb district, Baden-Württemberg
- Westhausen, Gotha, in the Gotha district, Thuringia
- Westhausen, Hildburghausen, in the Hildburghausen district, Thuringia
- A locality in the municipality of Bodenrode-Westhausen, in the Eichsfeld district, Thuringia

It may also refer to the following places in France:

- Westhouse, a commune in the Bas-Rhin department in Alsace
- Westhouse-Marmoutier, a commune in the Bas-Rhin department in Alsace
