= Hochheim =

Hochheim may refer to:

== Places ==
Germany

- Hochheim am Main, a town in Hesse, Germany
- Hochheim, Thuringia, a municipality in Thuringia, Germany

United States

- Hochheim, Texas
- Hochheim, Wisconsin

== People ==
- Eckhart von Hochheim (c. 1260 - c. 1327, German theologian, philosopher and mystic, commonly known as Meister Eckhart

== See also ==
- Höchheim, a municipality in the district of Rhön-Grabfeld in Bavaria
