= Haina (disambiguation) =

Haina may refer to:

- Haina, a municipality in the district Waldeck-Frankenberg, Hesse, Germany
- Haina, Gotha, a municipality in the district of Gotha, Thuringia, Germany
- Haina, Hildburghausen, a municipality in the district of Hildburghausen, Thuringia, Germany
- Bajos de Haina, a town in the Dominican Republic
- Haina (Haida village), a locality in British Columbia, Canada that was formerly the site of the Haida village of that name
