= Neufrankenroda =

Community near Gotha, Thuringia, Germany

Coordinates: 50°57′54″N 10°34′16″E

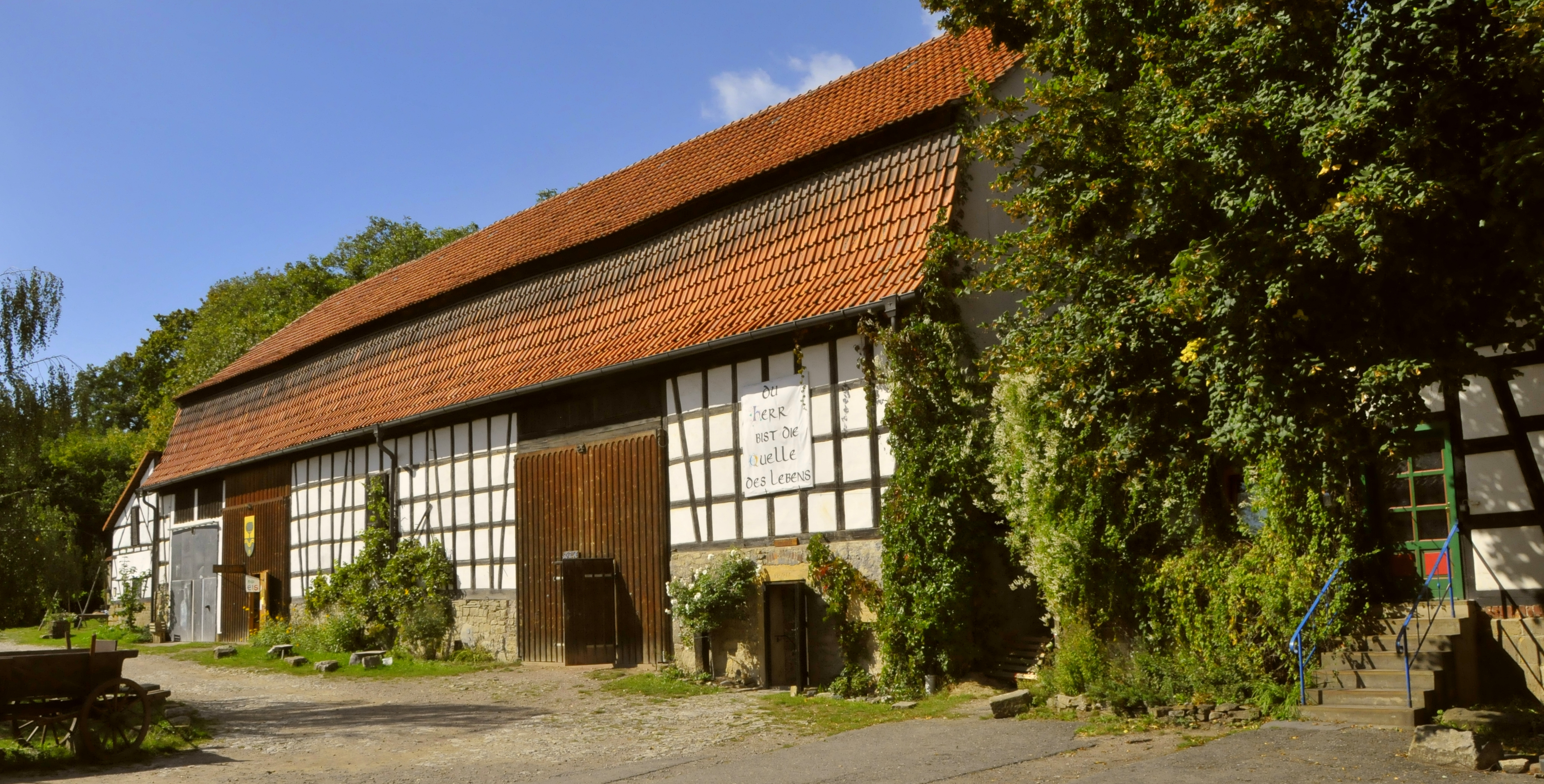
Christian community of SILOAH at Neufrankenroda

Neufrankenroda is a district of the rural community of Hörsel in the district of Gotha in Thuringia, Germany.

== Location ==
Neufrankenroda lies on a long, flat hill, (390 m above sea level) that separates the valley of the Hörsel from the lower lying valley of the Nesse. It is about 7 Kilometers north-west of the town of Gotha.

== History ==
The rual area and farmland may have been inhabited since pre-historic times. It was first mentioned in a document in 1104. Its name is reminiscent of the Franks, who lived there in the Early Middle Ages. Ownership of the farmlands often changed hands during the Middle Ages. In 1677, Duke Friedrich I of Gotha bought the place from the lords of Erffa and built a country estate. By the late 18th century, the area of Neufrankenroda was formed as a colony to help poor farmers and foresters live a more productive life.

After the Second World War, Neufrankenroda first became state property of the Soviet Zone of Occupation. It later became state property of the German Democratic Republic (DDR). During this time, the place gained some notoriety for its fruit growing and various horticultural breeding attempts. The so-called "Black Rose" was bred in Neufrankenroda and sold as an export good to various European countries. In the 1960s, several paved concrete roads were built connecting the Russian military bases near Gotha and the training area of the Kindel military airfield

== Christian community ==
Even during the DDR Regime, the German Protestant Church was already interested in the isolated location in order to build a Christian-style residential complex. Since the German Reunification, the Neufrankenroda settlement has been the center of the evangelical family community SILOAH.

The Royal Rangers, a Christian scouting organization, has had several of their 'Bundescamps' (Federal Camps or Jamborees) set up on the grounds of Neufrankenroda.

In 1997, the first Post-Reunification German 'Bundescamp' took place under the motto “Gemeinsam (Together)” in Neufrankenroda with 3,800 participants from 150 regular posts.

In 2005 more than 10,000 Ranger participants came to the 2005 'Bundescamp' under the motto “Entscheidungen (Decision)”, which again took place in Neufrankenroda, (which required over 45 hectares of camping space). This made it the largest scout camp in Germany after the Second World War and the largest Royal Rangers camp in the world at the time.

This was clearly exceeded again in August 2014 with the 'Bundescamp' under the motto “Aufbruch (Startup)”, when 14,800 registered Royal Rangers gathered on the site, which required over 65 hectares of camping space, with a temporary stadium being built for the evening programs.
