= List of compositions by Georg Böhm =

The following is a list of compositions by Georg Böhm, a German baroque composer and organist.

== Keyboard ==
=== Partitas ===
Böhm composed partitas on the following hymns:

- "Ach wie nichtig, ach wie flüchtig"
- "Auf meinen lieben Gott"
- "Aus tiefer Not schrei ich zu dir"
- "Christe der du bist Tag und Licht"
- "Freu dich sehr, o meine Seele"
- "Gelobet seist du, Jesu Christ"
- "Herr Jesu Christ, dich zu uns wend"
- "Jesu du bist allzu schöne"
- "Vater unser im Himmelreich"
- "Wer nur den lieben Gott lässt walten"

=== Chorale preludes ===
Böhm composed chorale preludes on hymns including:

- "Allein Gott in der Höh sei Ehr"
- "Christ lag in Todesbanden" (fantasia)
- "Christ lag in Todesbanden"
- "Christum wir sollen loben schon"
- "Erhalt uns, Herr, bei deinem Wort" (doubtful; by Buxtehude?)
- "Gelobet seist du, Jesu Christ"
- "Nun bitten wir den Heiligen Geist"
- "Vater unser im Himmelreich" (two versions)
- "Vom Himmel hoch, da komm ich her"

=== Free works ===
- Praeludium in C major
- Praeludium in D minor
- Praeludium in A minor
- Prelude in F major
- Praeludium (Prelude, Fugue, and Postlude) in G minor (& Chaconne in G major)
- 11 suites
  - C minor
  - D major
  - D minor
  - D minor
  - E♭ major (doubtful)
  - E♭ major
  - F major
  - F minor
  - F minor
  - G major
  - A minor
- Capriccio in D major
- Menuet in G major (in Clavierbuchlein, ii, for Anna Magdalena Bach)

== Sacred vocal ==
=== Cantatas ===
- Ach Herr, komme hinab und hilfe meinem Sohne, 5vv, 2 vn, 2 va, bn, bc; W
- Das Himmelreich ist gleich einem Könige, 5vv, 2 vn, 2 va, bn, bc; W
- Ich freue mich, 1v, vn, bc, lost
- Jauchzet Gott, alle Land, 5vv, 2 cornetts, 3 trombones, 2 vn, 2 va, bn, bc
- Mein Freund ist mein, 4vv, 2 vn, 2 va, bn, bc
- Nun komm der Heiden Heiland, on "Nun komm, der Heiden Heiland", 5vv, 3 trombones, 2 vn, bn, bc
- Sanctus est Dominus Deus Sabaoth (probably by Friedrich Nicolaus Bruhns), 4vv, 2 vn, bn, bc
- Satanas und sein Getümmel (probably by Friedrich Nicolaus Bruhns), 4vv, 2 ob/(2 vn, 2 va, bn, bc)
- Warum toben die Heiden (doubtful), 4vv, 2 fl, 2 ob, 2 tpt, timp, 2 vn, va, bc
- Wie lieblich sind deine Wohnungen, 4vv, 2 tpt, 2 vn, 2 va, bn, bc

=== Motets ===
- Auf, ihr Völker, danket Gott, 5vv
- Jesus schwebt mir in Gedanken, 4vv, lost
- Jesu, teure Gnadensonne, 4vv, lost
- Nun danket alle Gott, 5vv

=== Other sacred vocal ===
- St. Luke Passion, c1711, lost
- 23 sacred songs in Geistreiche Lieder (H.E. Elmenhorst)...auch in gewissen Abtheilungen geordnet von M. Johann Christoph Jauch (Lüneburg, 3/1700); ed. in DDT, xlv (1911/R)
- Music for the dedication of the Haus der Barmherzigkeit, Grahl, Lüneburg, 5 Dec 1708, lost
- St. John Passion (formerly attributed to George Frideric Handel)

=== False attributions ===
- Passion nach dem Evang. Johannes (the Passion according to the evangelist John). Previously attributed to Handel and published in volume nine of the Händel-Gesellschaft (1860); attributed to Böhm later, and finally, in 1987, to Christian Ritter. However, it is currently still thought to have been by Böhm.
