= Emil Lerp =

German businessman and inventor

- Born: 1 January 1886; Goldbach, Saxe-Coburg and Gotha
- Died: 1 January 1966 (aged 80); Hamburg, West Germany
- Known for: Inventor of the transportable gasoline chainsaw

Emil Lerp (1 January 1886 – 1 January 1966) was a German businessman and inventor of the first mass produced transportable gasoline chainsaw.

== Career ==
Lerp was born in Goldbach, Saxe-Coburg and Gotha in 1886. In 1927, he invented the transportable gasoline chainsaw. Lerp tested his invention on a hill called Dolmar, and named his company after the testing site. On 15 June 1928, Lerp received a patent in Germany for his invention. His former business partner Andreas Stihl founded the German company Stihl which also makes chainsaws.
