= Georg Böhm =

German composer and organist (1661–1733)

- Born: 2 September 1661; Hohenkirchen, Thuringia, Germany
- Died: 18 May 1733 (aged 71)
- Era: Baroque
- Works: List of compositions

Georg Böhm (2 September 1661 – 18 May 1733) was a German Baroque organist and composer. He is notable for his development of the chorale partita and for his influence on the young J. S. Bach.

== Life ==
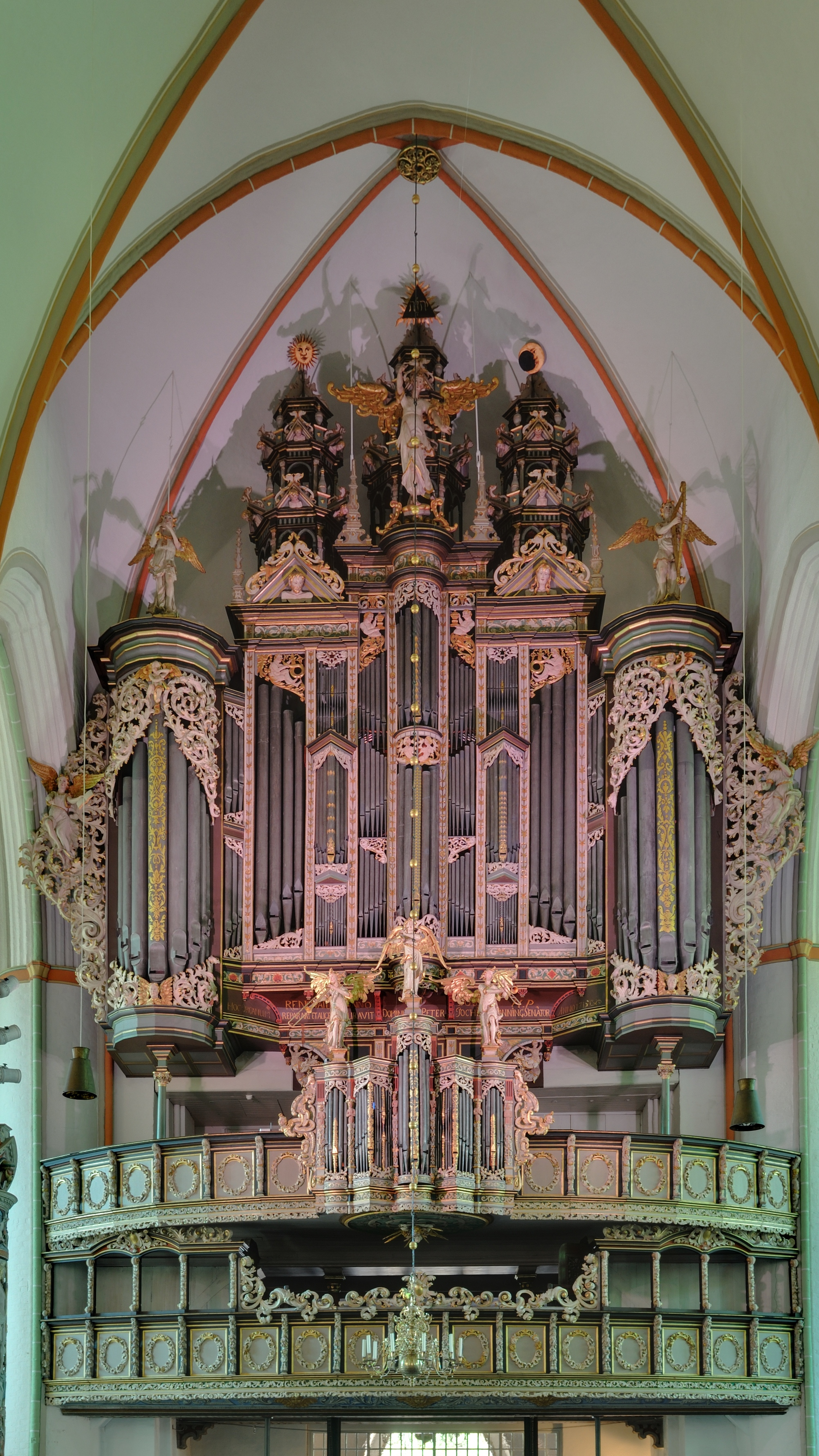
The baroque organ in the Johanniskirche, Lüneburg where Böhm was principal organist

Böhm was born in 1661 in Hohenkirchen. He received his first music lessons from his father, a schoolmaster and organist who died in 1675. He may also have received lessons from Johann Heinrich Hildebrand, Kantor at Ohrdruf, who was a pupil of Heinrich Bach and Johann Christian Bach. After his father's death, Böhm studied at the Lateinschule at Goldbach, and later at the Gymnasium at Gotha, graduating in 1684. Both cities had Kantors taught by the same members of the Bach family who may have influenced Böhm. On 28 August 1684 Böhm entered the University of Jena. Little is known about Böhm's university years or his life after graduation. He resurfaces again only in 1693, in Hamburg. We know nothing of how Böhm lived there, but presumably he was influenced by the musical life of the city and the surrounding area. French and Italian operas were regularly performed in Hamburg, while in the area of sacred music, Johann Adam Reincken of St. Katharine's Church (Katharinenkirche) was one of the leading organists and keyboard composers of his time. Böhm may have also heard Vincent Lübeck in the nearby Stade, or possibly even Dieterich Buxtehude in Lübeck, which was also close.

In 1698 Böhm succeeded Christian Flor as organist of the principal church of Lüneburg, the Church of St. John (Johanniskirche). Soon after Flor died in 1697, Böhm applied for an audition for the post, mentioning that he had no regular employment at the time. He was promptly accepted by the town council, settled in Lüneburg and held the position until his death. He married and had five sons. From 1700 to 1702 he must have met and possibly tutored the young Johann Sebastian Bach, who arrived in Lüneburg in 1700 and studied at the Michaelisschule, a school associated with the Church of St. Michael (Michaeliskirche). Practically no direct evidence exists to prove that Bach studied under Böhm, and indeed studying with the organist of the Johanniskirche would have been difficult for a pupil of the Michaelisschule, since the two choirs were not on good terms. Yet this apprenticeship is extremely likely. Carl Philipp Emanuel Bach, writing to Johann Nikolaus Forkel in 1775, claimed his father loved and studied Böhm's music, and a correction in his note shows that his first thought was to say that Böhm was Johann Sebastian's teacher. On 31 August 2006 the discovery of the earliest known Bach autographs was announced, one of them (a copy of Reincken's famous chorale fantasia on "An Wasserflüssen Babylon") signed "Il Fine â Dom. Georg: Böhme descriptum ao. 1700 Lunaburgi". The "Dom." bit may suggest either "domus" (house) or "Dominus" (master), but in any case it proves that Bach knew Böhm personally. This connection must have become a close friendship that lasted for many years, for in 1727 Bach named none other than Böhm as his northern agent for the sale of keyboard partitas nos. 2 and 3.

Böhm died on 18 May 1733 at the advanced age of 71. His son Jakob Christian, who would have inherited his post, died young. The position eventually went to Ludwig Ernst Hartmann, Böhm's son-in-law.

== Works ==
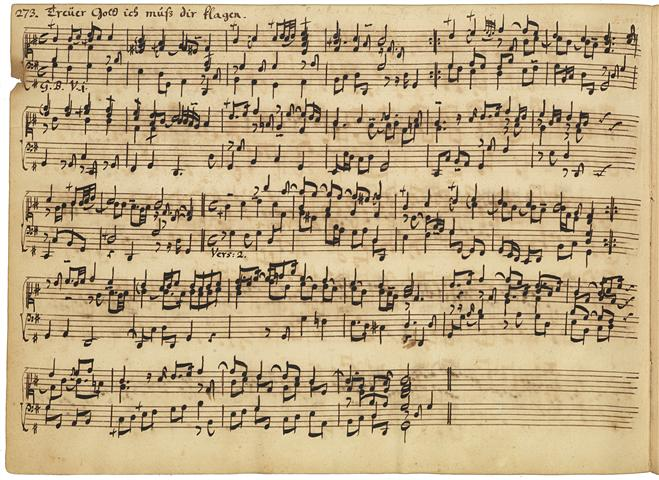
Autograph manuscript of Böhm's organ chorale partita Treüer Gott, ich muß dir klagen

Böhm is mainly known for his compositions for organ and harpsichord (primarily preludes, fugues, and partitas). Many of his works were designed with flexibility of instrument in mind: a particular piece could be played on the organ, the harpsichord, or the clavichord, depending on the situation in which the performer found himself. Böhm's music is notable for its use of the stylus phantasticus, a style of playing based on improvisation.

Böhm's most important contribution to North German keyboard music is the chorale partita, a large-scale composition consisting of several variations on a particular chorale melody. He effectively invented the genre, writing several partitas of varying lengths and on diverse tunes. Later composers also took up the genre, most notably Johann Sebastian Bach. Böhm's chorale partitas feature sophisticated figuration in several voices over the harmonic structure of the chorale. His partitas generally have a rustic character and can be successfully performed on either the organ or the harpsichord.

== Recordings ==
- Complete Harpsichord and Organ Music - Simone Stella (harpsichord, organ), OnClassical (OC72-75B) licensed for Brilliant Classics (BC 94612), 2013.
- Die Claviersuiten - Mitzi Meyerson (harpsichord), GLOSSA (GCD 921801), 2003.
- Keyboard Works - Stef Tuinstra (organ & harpsichord), DOCUMENT (DOC 1102), 2011.
