= Chorale partita =

Large-scale piece of music written for a keyboard

A chorale partita is a large-scale multimovement piece of music based on a chorale and written for a keyboard instrument. It represents a fusion of two forms of keyboard music: the north German chorale prelude and the Italian variation canzona. The first movement is a harmonization of the germinating chorale, while the subsequent movements are variations on the chorale melody and harmonization, using a variety of textures and figuration. Chorale partitas are generally played on the organ or harpsichord. The chorale partita was a popular style during the middle and late Baroque era. Georg Böhm is credited as the inventor of the chorale partita, and Johann Pachelbel and Johann Sebastian Bach also wrote many of these works.
