= Ryszard Jaśniewicz =

Polish actor and director (1939–2021)

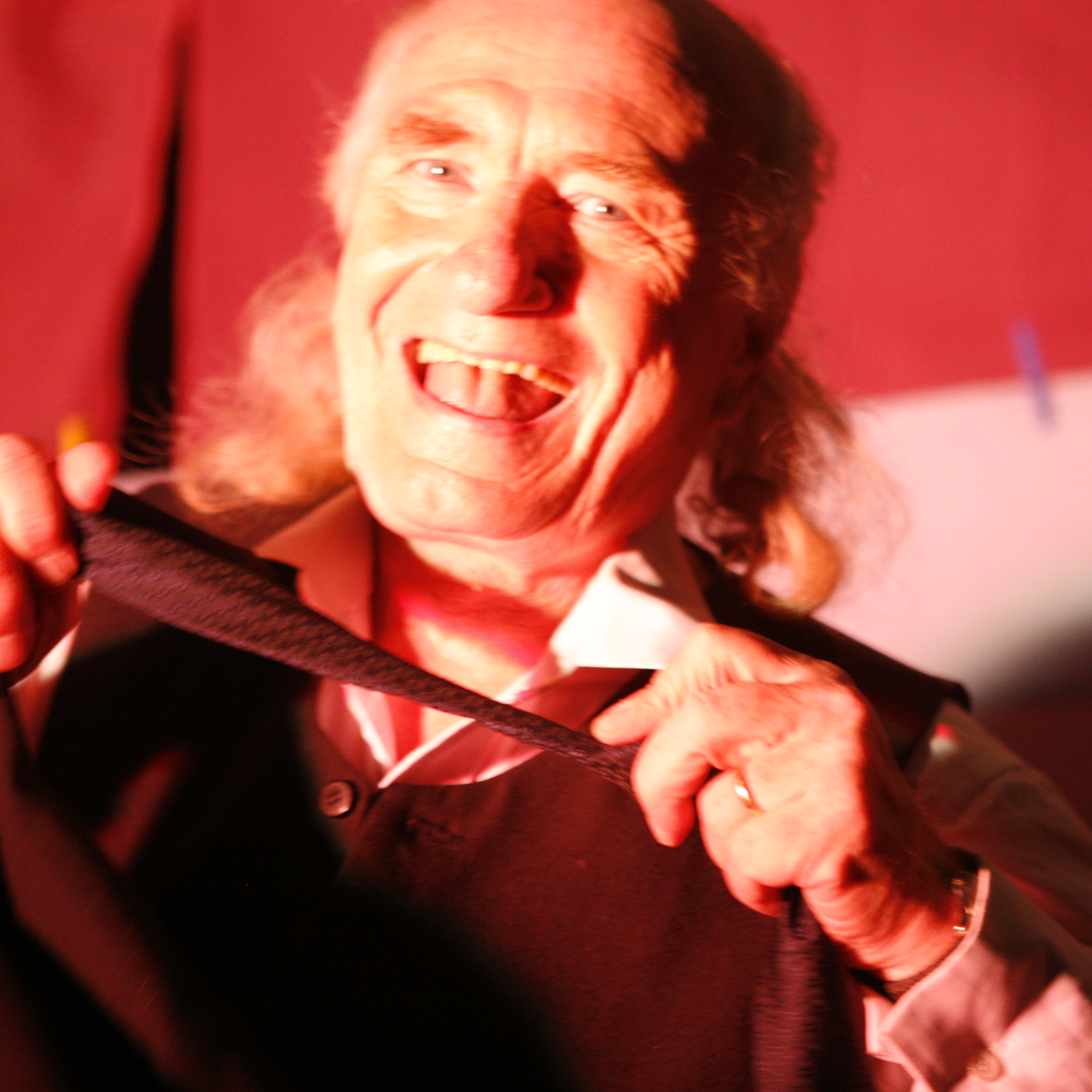
- Ryszard Jaśniewicz in 2009
- Born: October 15, 1939; Nowogródek, Poland
- Died: November 4, 2021; Gdańsk, Poland
- Education: Państwowa Wyższa Szkoła Teatralna in Kraków, Poland
- Occupations: actor; director; playwright; poet; educator
- Years active: 1957–2021
- Spouse: Gabriela Pewińska-Jaśniewicz

Ryszard Jaśniewicz (October 15, 1939 – November 4, 2021) was a Polish actor, director, playwright, poet and educator. He worked in Polish drama theaters in Wrocław, Bydgoszcz, Słupsk and most of the time with the Wybrzeże Theater in Gdańsk. In 1999, together with his wife, Gabriela Pewińska-Jaśniewicz, he founded Teatr z Polski 6 (Theater from Poland 6) and staged 17 monodramas. Since 2008, the theater has been working in House of Plague in Gdańsk.
