= Nesse (Hörsel) =

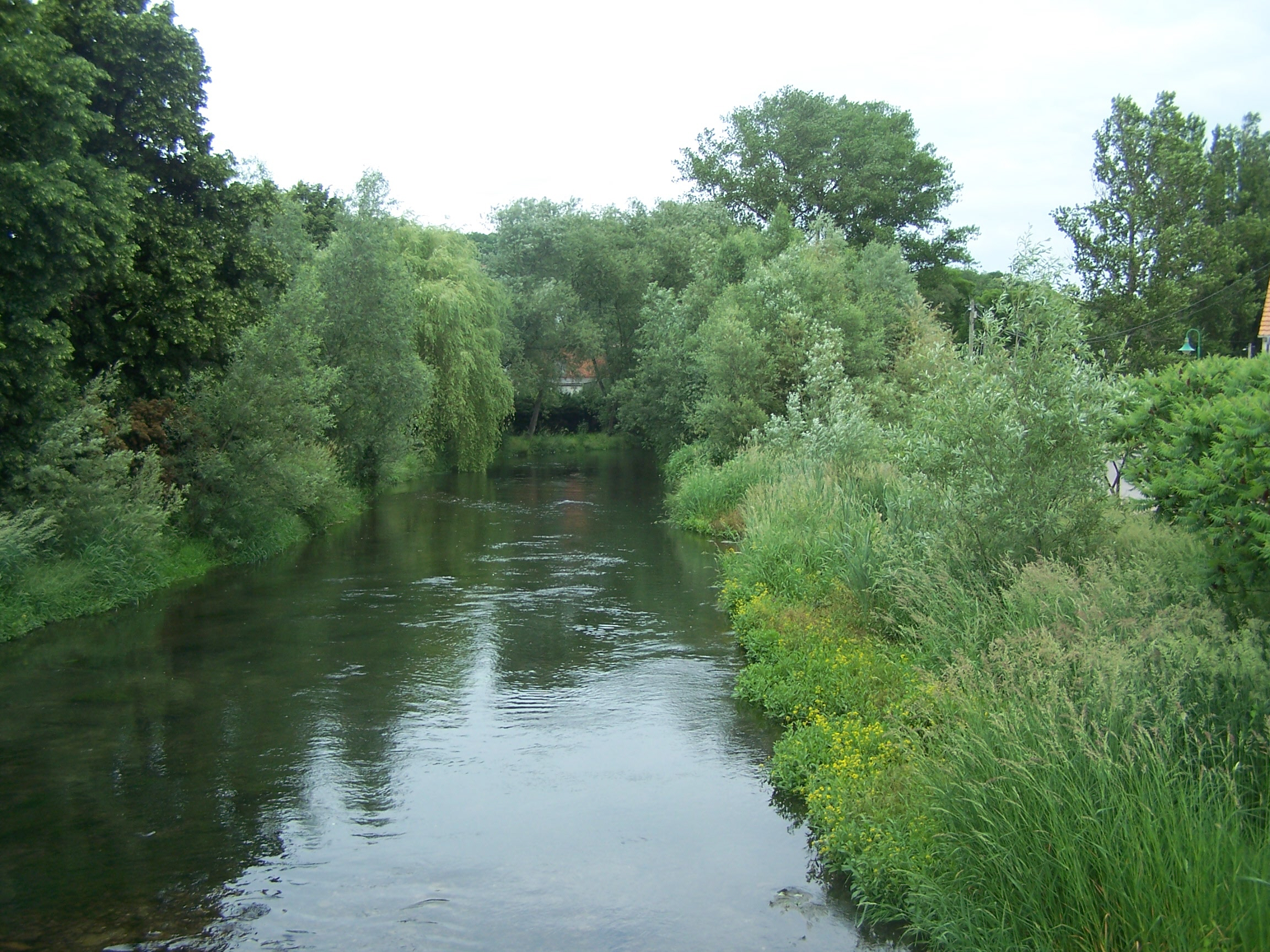

Location
- Country: Germany
- State: Thuringia

Physical characteristics
- Source
  - elevation: 295 m (968 ft)
- Mouth
  - location: Hörsel
  - coordinates: 50.9799°N 10.3399°E
  - elevation: 215 m (705 ft)

Basin features
- Progression: Hörsel→ Werra→ Weser→ North Sea

The Nesse (German pronunciation: [ˈnɛsə]) is a 54.5-kilometre-long (33.9 mi) tributary of the Hörsel in the southern Thuringia. Strictly speaking, it represents a second, right main branch of the Hörsel, which brings about as much water to join the Hörsel as the Hörsel itself and drains an even larger catchment area.

The Nesse is a typical lowland river with an average bed gradient of only about 1.5 ‰. According to the Thuringia Water Act it has the status of a first order watercourse and is therefore under the maintenance obligation of the Free State of Thuringia.

== Origin ==
The Nesse was formed at the end of the last ice age, geologists assume that a dammed lake with meltwater forced the breakthrough to the west. Neighbouring rivers belong to the Elbe river basin, the watershed of both rivers runs over Alacher Höhe and Bienstädter Höhe.

== Course ==
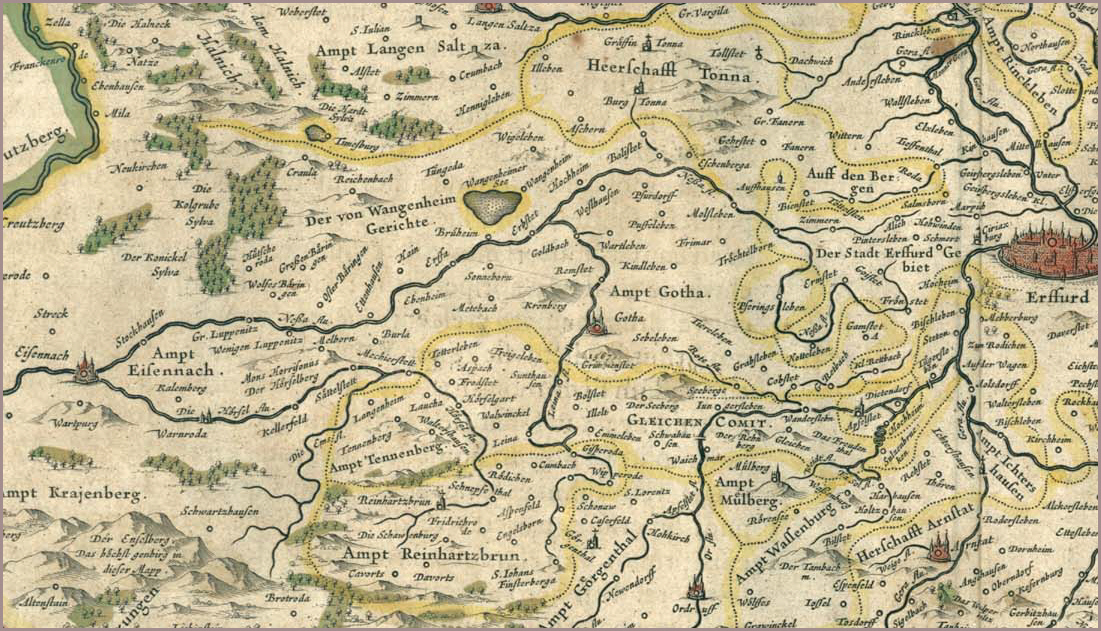
The County of Thuringia around 1645 (after Blaeu, detail)

=== Source area and upper cours ===
The Nesse river is created by the confluence of several drainage and spring ditches at 295 m (968 ft) above about 7 km (4.3 mi) west of Erfurt in the district Alach, not far from Erfurt Airport, and then flows in a westerly direction through the north of the district of Gotha. In Nottleben, the Mollbach, its first bigger tributary flows from the right, further right tributaries of the upper course flowing further below come from the Fahnersche Höhe.

=== Lower course ===
At the former railway station of Wangenheim the Wilder Graben (Nesse), which is fed in particular by the Leinakanal, flows into the Nesse from Gotha or coming from the left. Here ends the upper course of the Nesse, which up to now has been classified as a water body of 2nd class according to § 3 of the Thuringian Water Act. Up to the estuary the Nesse is a watercourse of the 1st class. About 1 kilometre (0.62 mi) to the west of Wangenheim is the Talsperre Tüngeda/Wangenheim, which is fed by the Mittagswassergraben from the direction Tüngeda and drains about 2 km (1.2 mi) southeast into the Nesse. The Wangenheimer See existed in its place until the 18th century. This is the first inflow from the Hainich. At Sonneborn, 2.5 km (1.6 mi) further on, the Arzbach flows from the left, and another Hainich tributary flows another 4 km (2.5 mi) below at Friedrichswerth with the Bieberbach from the right.

Directly at the district border of the district of Gotha with the Wartburgkreis, the 380 m (420 yd) long Talbrücke Nessetal of the Bundesautobahn 4 spans the water since 2009. On the left side the river approaches the Hörselberge, from which, however, only very short streams come. Hydrogeological investigations confirmed an underground connection with the Hörsel valley. From Ettenhausen an der Nesse to Stockhausen the Hörsel water feeds a dozen strong karst springs.

In the Wartburgkreis the Nesse flows through the community Hörselberg-Hainich, where in Großenlupnitz the Böber flows from the right and reaches the area of the town Eisenach at Stockhausen. As the last tributary, the Trenkelbach flows into the Nesse at Petersberg.

=== Confluence ===
The river mouth you can see today, was created in the Middle Ages by the construction of the Köpping Graben. This originally served to regulate the water level of the Hörsel. The Köppinggraben is located between the Köppingbrücke (Weimarische Straße) and Heinrichstraße. After about 300 m (330 yd), the river meets a weir. Here the Nessemühlgraben branches off from the Hörsel and diverts about half of its water volume into the medieval mill area on the northern and western edge of Eisenach's old town. The original mouth of the Nesse can still be recognised on historical maps from the 18th century: it was located to the west of Eichhölzchen on what is now Tiefenbacher Allee. The site has been reshaped since the construction of the car factory.

== Tributaries ==
The catchment area of the Nesse River, with 426.3 km^{2} (164.6 mi^{2}), comprises 54.4% of the total catchment area of the Hörsel (784 km^{2} (303 mi^{2})) and 139.5% of the Hörse catchment area above the Nesse estuary (305.6 km^{2} (118.0 mi^{2})) Thus, the Nesse brings about the same amount of water (3.14 m^{3}/s (111 cu ft/s)) to unite with the Hörsel as the Hörsel itself (3.11 m^{3}/s (110 cu ft/s)). All Nesse tributaries come from the Thuringian Basin and its marginal plates, while its receiving water Hörsel is largely fed by the montane Thuringian Forest.

Most of the tributaries of the Nesse are typical lowland streams with low gradient. Today, their courses are largely straightened and integrated into a system of drainage ditches. The stream lengths given below each refer approximately to the permanently water-bearing part. Since most of the courses are canalized and integrated into the drainage system up to the corresponding watershed, they temporarily carry water over a much longer length during high precipitation or snowmelt, but in dry seasons they are de facto sometimes much shorter than indicated.

The Leina Channel forms a connection from the Hörsel headwaters Leina—and the (upper) Apfelstädt from the system Gera/Unstrut/Saale/Elbe —to the subsystem of the Nesse. It was already built in the Middle Ages to supply the town Gotha with water from the Thuringian Forest, and to which the Nesse flows via the Wilder Graben. The catchment area of the Wilder Graben is with 104.6 km^{2} (40.4 mi^{2}) barely smaller than that of the Nesse above (131.4 km^{2} (50.7 mi^{2})), in addition there is the proportionate catchment area of Leina (estimated by TLUG Jena to be 20.8 km^{2} (8.0 mi^{2})) and Apfelstädt. In purely mathematical terms, the length of the Nesse River over the upper Leina, Leinakanal and Wilden Graben is 63.5 km (39.5 mi).

Name	Direction	Length [km]	Catchment- area [km²]	Mouth elevation [m. ü. NN]	Location of confluence (*: bei)	DGKZ
Mollbach (Origin in Alacher See)	right	7,0	14,0	285	Nottleben	4168-1?
Immer (with Talsperre Friemar)	right	3,8		281	Friemar	4168-1?
Neußenbach	right	4,3	7,6	278	oberh. Molschlebens	4168-1?
Attichbach	right	3,7		276	unterh. Molschlebens	4168-1?
Eschenberger Bach	right	3,5		275		4168-1?
Wingferborn	right	5,7		274	Eschenbergen*	4168-1?
Lachgraben	left	3,0		272	oberh. Bufleben-Pfullendorfs	4168-1?
Krautmaßengraben	right	2,7		258	Wangenheim*	4168-1?
Wilder Graben (inc. Leinakanal)	left	17,1	104,6	258	Goldbach*	4168-2
Mittagswasser (with Talsperre Tüngeda)	right	11,5	28,2	257	oberh. Sonneborn-Eberstädts	4168-3?
Arzbach	left	3,5	14,8	256	Sonneborn	4168-4
Gliemen	left	4,1		255		4168-5?
Brüheimer Bach	right	2,9		254		4168-5?
Bieberbach	right	8,6	47,5	252	Friedrichswerth	4168-6
Matergraben	right	2,3		234	Wenigenlupnitz	4168-7?
Böber	right	8,9	29,5	228	Großenlupnitz	4168-8
Holzbach	right	1,9		225	Eisenach-Stockhausen	4168-9?

== Ecology and energy production ==
Especially in the 1980s, the Nesse was affected by heavy pollution from the confluence of the Wilden Graben. Via the Wilden Graben, insufficiently treated wastewater from the catchment area of the Gotha sewage treatment plant was fed into the river. With the construction of a state-of-the-art sewage treatment plant in Gotha by 1993, the water quality could be decisively improved.

Active hydropower plants are located on the River Nesse in the districts of Ettenhausen, Wenigenlupnitz and Großenlupnitz in the municipality of Hörselberg-Hainich and in Eisenach.

== See also ==
- List of rivers of Thuringia
