= Nessetal =

- Municipality
- Coat of arms

- Location of Nessetal within Gotha district
- Interactive map of Nessetal
- Location within Germany Location within Thuringia
- Coordinates: 51°0′N 10°39′E
- Country: Germany
- State: Thuringia
- District: Gotha
- Subdivisions: 13

Government
  - Mayor (2019–25): Eva-Marie Schuchardt (FW)

Area
  - Total: 91.53 km^{2} (35.34 sq mi)
- Elevation: 285 m (935 ft)

Population (2025-12-31)
  - Total: 7,938
  - Density: 86.73/km^{2} (224.6/sq mi)
- Time zone: UTC+01:00 (CET)
  - Summer (DST): UTC+02:00 (CEST)
- Postal codes: 99869
- Dialling codes: 03621, 036254, 036255
- Vehicle registration: GTH
- Website: http://gemeinde-nessetal.de/

Nessetal (German pronunciation: [ˈnɛsətaːl], lit. 'Nesse Valley') is a municipality in the district of Gotha, in Thuringia, Germany. It was created with effect from 1 January 2019 by the merger of the former municipalities of Ballstädt, Brüheim, Bufleben, Friedrichswerth, Goldbach, Haina, Hochheim, Remstädt, Wangenheim, Warza and Westhausen. These former municipalities are now Ortschaften of the municipality Nessetal. The name refers to the river Nesse.
