= Teatr z Polski 6 =

Theatre in Gdańsk, Poland

Teatr z Polski 6 (House of Plague)
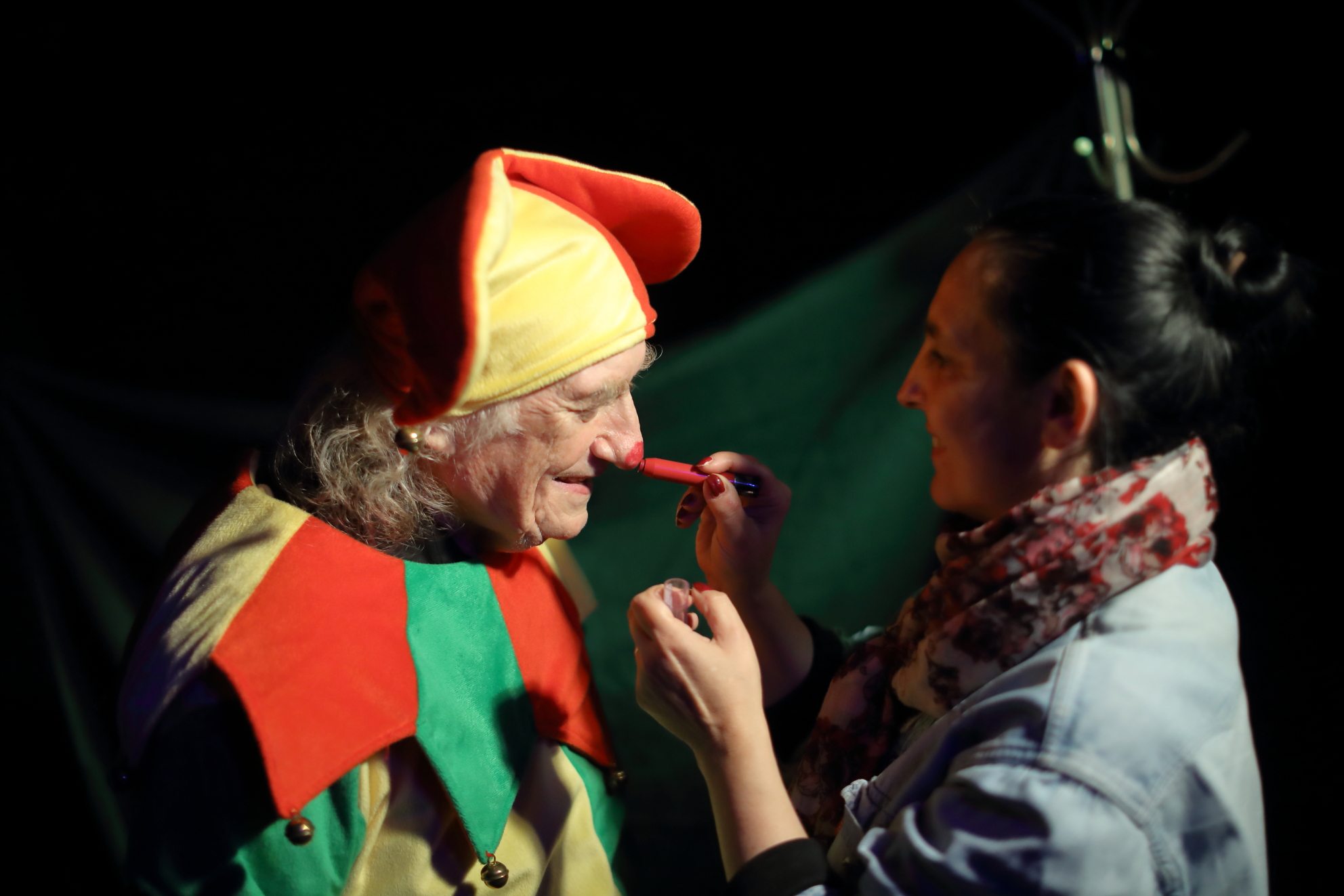
- Before the premiere of "Lovestruck”

- Location within Poland Location within Pomeranian Voivodeship

General information
- Architectural style: Gothic
- Location: Gdańsk, Poland, Poland
- Coordinates: 54°24′32.90″N 18°33′20.77″E
- Completed: around 14th century

Teatr z Polski 6 (Theater from Poland 6) is a private, original stage set up by the actor and director Ryszard Jaśniewicz and his wife―Gabriela Pewińska-Jaśniewicz. The theater also includes poetry and recitation workshops "Jaśniewicz recytuje, spróbuj i Ty!" ("Jaśniewicz recites, try it!"), reading performances, meetings with authors and theater lessons.

In 2008, the House of Plague in Gdańsk-Oliwa became the stage of Teatr z Polski 6. It is here that Ryszard Jaśniewicz for the first time, after heart surgery, played the monodrama My Heart, composed of wonderful monologues from Polish drama, and then staged another fifteen monodramas.

The last performance before the sudden death of Ryszard Jaśniewicz was the monodrama The Builder by Gabriela Pewińska, which premiered on 26 September 2021.
