= Nesse (Werra) =

Location
- Country: Germany
- State: North Hessen

Physical characteristics
- Source
  - elevation: 125 m (410 ft)
- Mouth
  - location: Werra
  - coordinates: 51°00′44″N 10°07′17″E
- Length: 5.9 km (3.7 mi)
- Basin size: 24.1 km^{2} (9.3 sq mi)

Basin features
- Progression: Werra→ Weser→ North Sea

The Nesse is a river in Werra-Meißner District, North Hessen, Germany. It is 5.9 km long. It flows into the Werra near Herleshausen.
