= Brüheim =

- Ortschaft of Nessetal
- Interactive map of Brüheim
- Location within Germany Location within Thuringia
- Coordinates: 51°0′3″N 10°35′4″E
- Country: Germany
- State: Thuringia
- District: Gotha
- Municipality: Nessetal

Area
  - Total: 7.44 km^{2} (2.87 sq mi)
- Elevation: 260 m (850 ft)

Population (2017-12-31)
  - Total: 457
  - Density: 61.4/km^{2} (159/sq mi)
- Time zone: UTC+01:00 (CET)
  - Summer (DST): UTC+02:00 (CEST)
- Postal codes: 99869
- Dialling codes: 036254
- Vehicle registration: GTH

Brüheim (German pronunciation: [ˈbʁyːhaɪm]) is a village and Ortschaft of the municipality Nessetal in the district of Gotha, in Thuringia, Germany. Before 1 January 2019, when it was merged into the new municipality Nessetal, it was an independent municipality.
