= Warza =

- Ortschaft of Nessetal
- Interactive map of Warza
- Location within Germany Location within Thuringia
- Coordinates: 50°59′49″N 10°41′20″E
- Country: Germany
- State: Thuringia
- District: Gotha
- Municipality: Nessetal

Area
  - Total: 6.49 km^{2} (2.51 sq mi)
- Elevation: 278 m (912 ft)

Population (2017-12-31)
  - Total: 721
  - Density: 111/km^{2} (288/sq mi)
- Time zone: UTC+01:00 (CET)
  - Summer (DST): UTC+02:00 (CEST)
- Postal codes: 99869
- Dialling codes: 036255
- Vehicle registration: GTH
- Website: gemeinde-nessetal.de

Warza (German pronunciation: [ˈvaʁtsa]) is a village and Ortschaft of the municipality Nessetal in the district of Gotha, in Thuringia, Germany. Before 1 January 2019, when it was merged into the new municipality Nessetal, it was an independent municipality.
