= St. Michaelis, Lüneburg =

Coordinates: 53°14′57.76″N 10°24′4.30″E

St. Michaelis
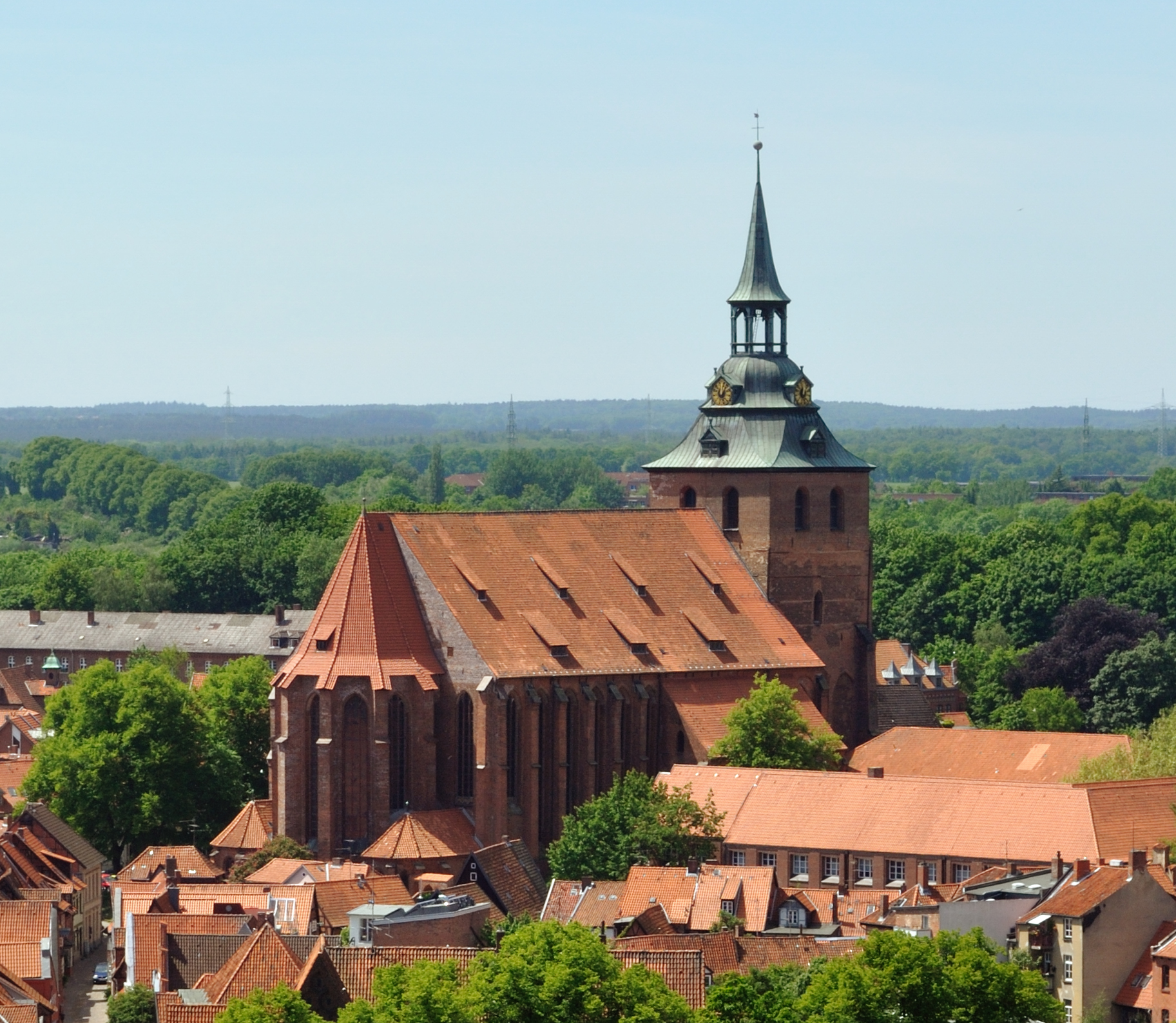
- St. Michaelis from the north-east
- St. Michaelis
- Location: Lüneburg, Lower Saxony
- Country: Germany
- Denomination: Lutheran
- Previous denomination: Catholic
- Website: www.sankt-michaelis.de

History
- Dedication: St. Michael
- Consecrated: 1379

Architecture
- Style: Brick Gothic

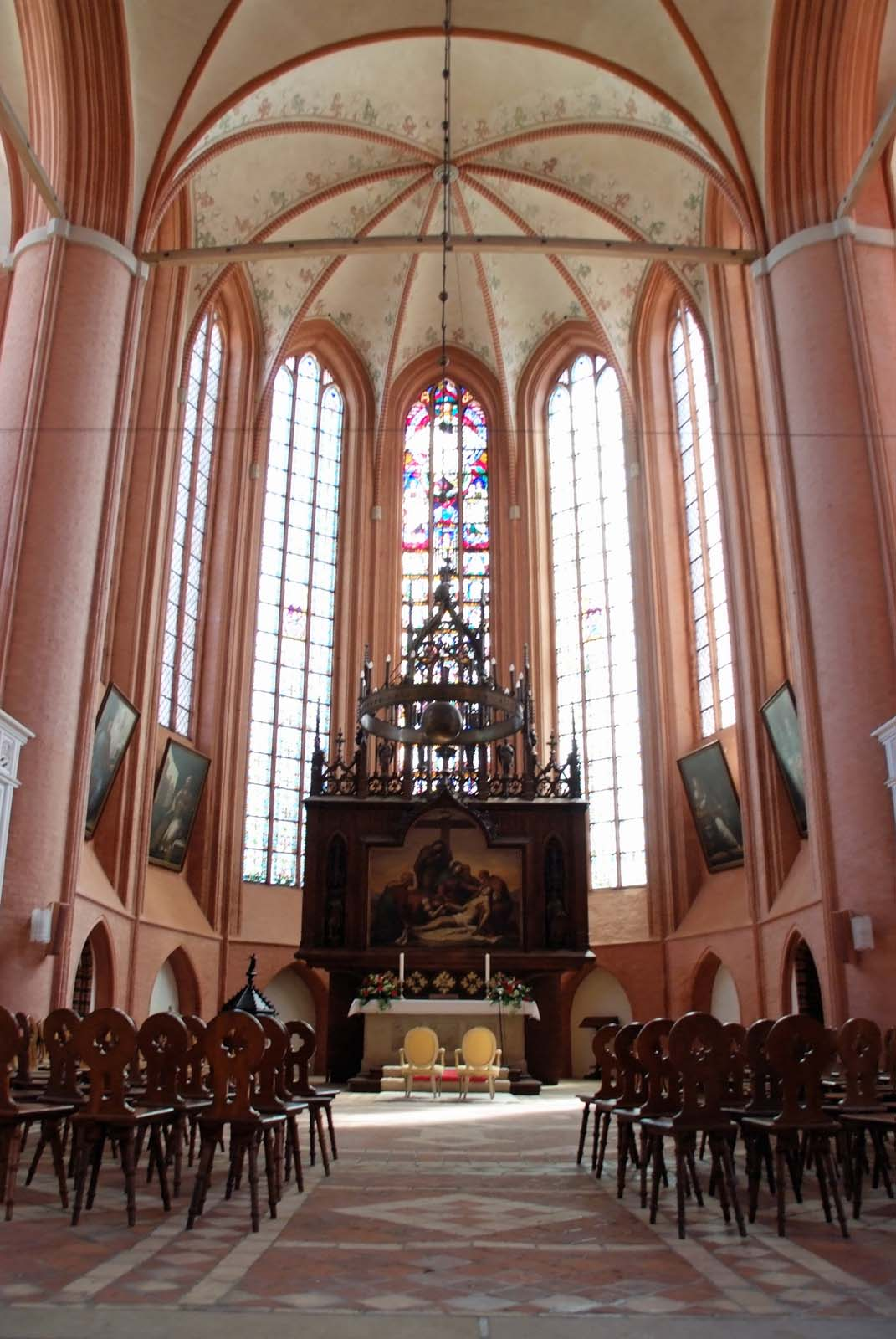
Interior

St. Michaelis is one of the main churches in Lüneburg, Lower Saxony, Germany. It was first an abbey church of the former monastery of Benedictines, built from 1376 in brick Gothic style. It became Lutheran during the Reformation. Johann Sebastian Bach was for two years a pupil at the school of St. Michaelis.

== History ==
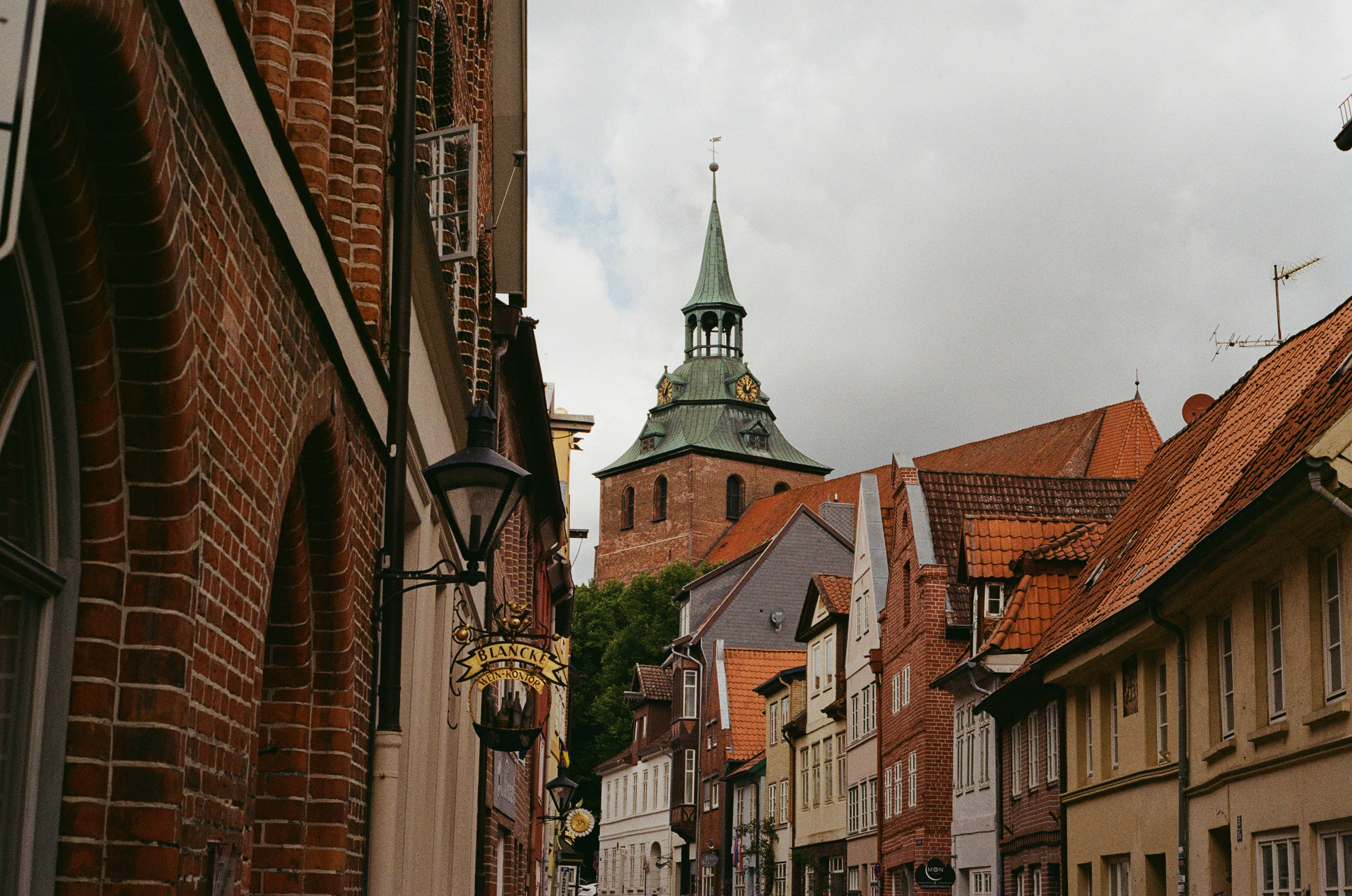
St Michaelis from the south east

St. Michaelis was built as an abbey church of the former monastery of Benedictines. The present church followed three former buildings. Its corner stone was laid on 14 July 1376 in the presence of Bishop Heinrich von Verden, who was bishop from 1367 to 1381. A lower church was consecrated in 1379. The upper church was finished in 1412, the steeple in 1434. The building was erected as a hall church in brick Gothic style. The parish became Lutheran during the Reformation. The monastery became in 1532 a rare community of Protestant men who practised celibacy and common housing. The roof of the steeple was damaged in a storm in 1746, and a new top was erected between 1761 and 1767. At the end of the 18th century, a remodeling of the interior was performed by architect Wilhelm Meissner, during which the medieval furnishings were lost.

The church is one of the attractions of the European Route of Brick Gothic.

=== School ===
A school (Partikularschule) associated with the monastery and the church was probably established already in the 11th century. It is documented from 1353 to 1818/19. As a teenager, Johann Sebastian Bach was a boarder at the school and a singer in the church choir, for two years from 1700 to 1702. He probably also contributed to the musical life of St. Michaelis as an organist, as he is known to have studied the instrument during his time in Lüneburg. Another famous pupil was Johann Abraham Peter Schulz who attended the school from 1757 to 1759, and who composed the melody for "Der Mond ist aufgegangen".

=== Organ and church music ===
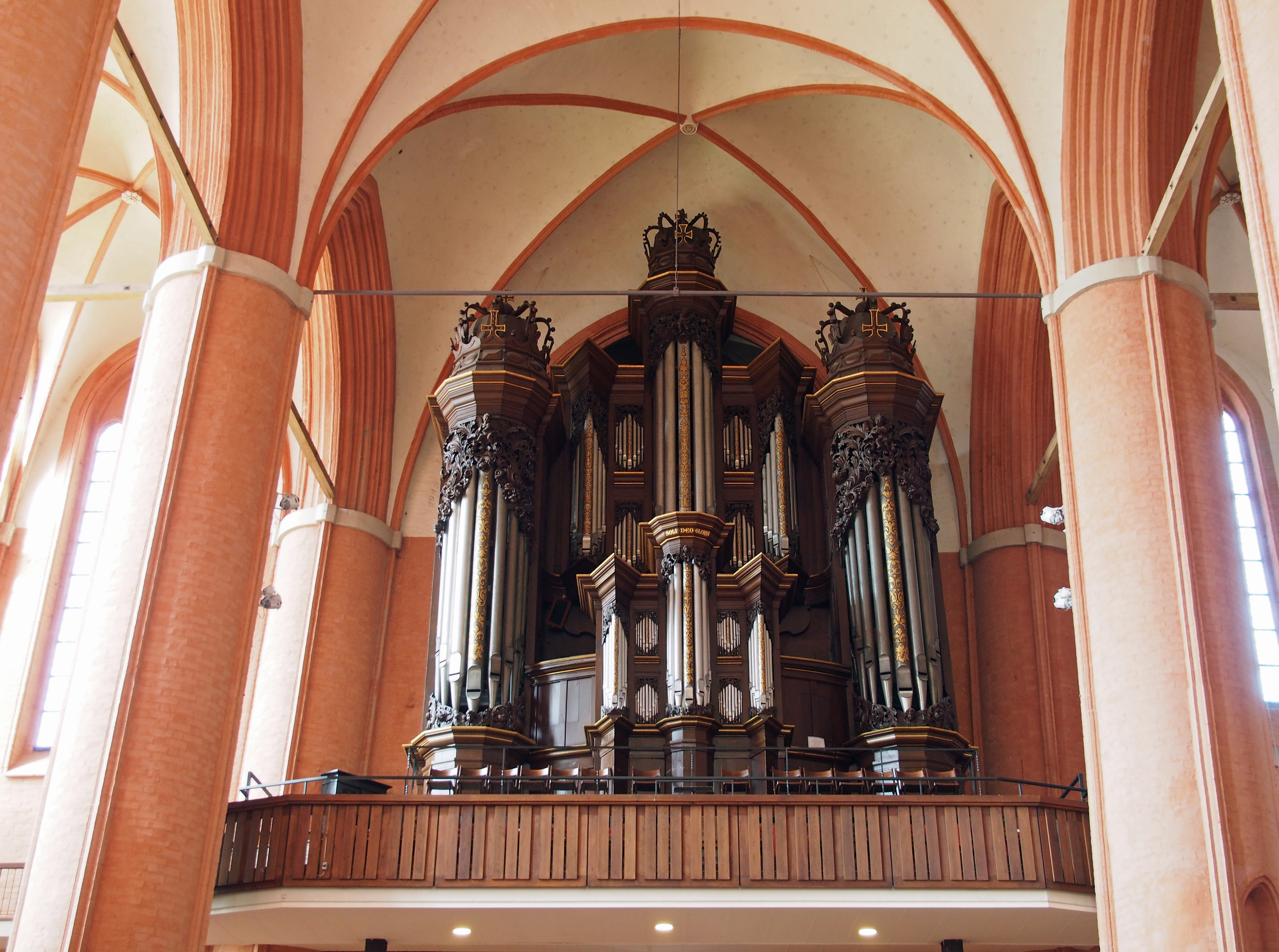
Historic prospect of the Dropa organ

The organ dates back to an instrument built in 1708 by Matthias Dropa, a pupil of Arp Schnitger. It was refurbished several times. In 1871, the organ builder Philip Furtwängler & Söhne replaced most of Dropa's pipes. In 1931, Furtwängler & Hammer built a new organ in the case by Dropa. In 1999, the organ was restored, retaining historic parts from 1708 and 1931. St. Michaelis is a venue for sacred music in services and concerts, including events of the Schleswig-Holstein Musik Festival.
