= Remstädt =

- Ortschaft of Nessetal
- Interactive map of Remstädt
- Location within Germany Location within Thuringia
- Coordinates: 50°58′43″N 10°41′16″E
- Country: Germany
- State: Thuringia
- District: Gotha
- Municipality: Nessetal

Area
  - Total: 6.48 km^{2} (2.50 sq mi)
- Elevation: 375 m (1,230 ft)

Population (2017-12-31)
  - Total: 970
  - Density: 150/km^{2} (390/sq mi)
- Time zone: UTC+01:00 (CET)
  - Summer (DST): UTC+02:00 (CEST)
- Postal codes: 99869
- Dialling codes: 03621
- Vehicle registration: GTH

Remstädt (German pronunciation: [ˈʁɛmʃtɛt]) is a village and Ortschaft of the municipality Nessetal in the district of Gotha, in Thuringia, Germany. Before 1 January 2019, when it was merged into the new municipality Nessetal, it was an independent municipality.
