= Haina, Gotha =

Haina
- Ortschaft of Nessetal
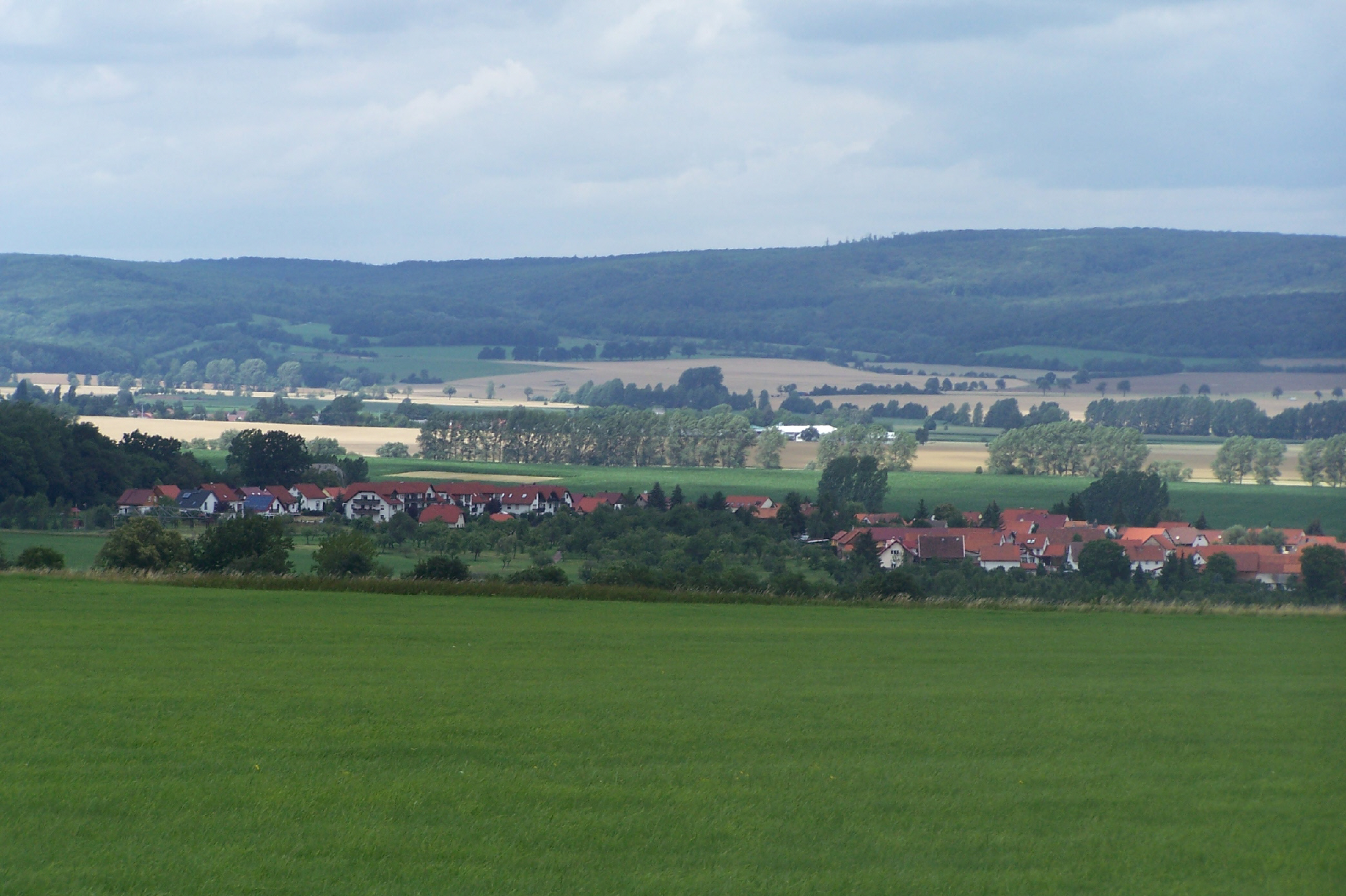
- Interactive map of Haina
- Location within Germany Location within Thuringia
- Coordinates: 50°59′22″N 10°31′4″E
- Country: Germany
- State: Thuringia
- District: Gotha
- Municipality: Nessetal

Area
  - Total: 6.72 km^{2} (2.59 sq mi)
- Elevation: 280 m (920 ft)

Population (2017-12-31)
  - Total: 468
  - Density: 69.6/km^{2} (180/sq mi)
- Time zone: UTC+01:00 (CET)
  - Summer (DST): UTC+02:00 (CEST)
- Postal codes: 99869
- Dialling codes: 036254
- Vehicle registration: GTH

Haina (German pronunciation: [ˈhaɪna]) is a village and Ortschaft of the municipality Nessetal in the district of Gotha, in Thuringia, Germany. Before 1 January 2019, when it was merged into the new municipality Nessetal, it was an independent municipality.
