= European Route of Brick Gothic =

The European Route of Brick Gothic (EuRoB) is an association of cities, towns, regions, municipalities and institutions that have Brick Gothic buildings in their territory or have their headquarters in a Brick Gothic building. The network also includes several sponsors and cooperation partners.

The route joins several hundred religious and secular buildings from Denmark, Germany and Poland, including monasteries, churches, town halls and town houses, as well as city fortifications such as city walls, towers and city gates.

The purpose of the association is the promotion of art and culture, of science, education and international understanding, and in particular the preservation of our common cultural heritage of Brick Gothic and its promotion to a larger public.

== History ==
In the 1990s, Gottfried Kiesow, founder and long-standing chairman of the board of the Deutsche Stiftung Denkmalschutz ("German Foundation for Monument Protection"), launched the initiative Wege zur Backsteingotik ("Routes to Brick Gothic"). Its mission was to preserve the numerous Brick Gothic monuments in the territory of the former German Democratic Republic and to raise awareness of the unique cultural heritage of Brick Gothic. The initiative culminated in a dedicated exhibition on show in the Hanseatic cities of Greifswald, Rostock, Stralsund, Wismar and Lübeck in 2002. It can still be viewed today in St. Mary's Church in Wismar and in St. Mary's Church in Neubrandenburg.

In 2002, the "Routes to Brick Gothic" initiative resulted in two successive EU projects called "European Route of Brick Gothic": EuRoB and EuRoB II. Both projects involved around 34 project partners (including almost 30 cities and regions) from Denmark, Germany, Sweden, Poland, Estonia, Latvia, and Lithuania. The second EU project, EuRoB II, ended in 2007.

On 26 September 2007, several former project partners joined forces in Greifswald and established the association "Europäische Route der Backsteingotik e. V." (European Route of Brick Gothic). In 2008, the association was nominated as “Trend Brand of the Year” by Germany's largest cultural magazine “KulturSPIEGEL” and the Causales agency, and in 2010 it was awarded the gold medal at the leading European trade fair for the preservation of historical monuments, the “denkmal” fair in Leipzig, for outstanding achievements in the field of monument conservation. In 2012, the association received the special prize of the jury of the European association for the protection of historical monuments Europa-Nostra.

== Purpose and work of the association ==
The association's aims are:

- the maintenance and further development of the historico-cultural European Route of Brick Gothic;
- the registration and documentation of Brick Gothic architectural monuments along the route;
- the presentation of the history and development of European Brick Gothic and its architectural, art and historico-cultural context;
- the presentation of the European Route of Brick Gothic and its buildings to the European public;
- the production of informative events and historico-cultural activities and projects on European Brick Gothic;
- the design and production of further education activities for European Brick Gothic members and stakeholders;
- the production of local, regional and international publications, presentations and events to raise awareness among the public of the “European Route of Brick Gothic” and to involve local citizens and stakeholders;
- the development and dissemination of information material and the certification of electronic media on European Brick Gothic.

Two active workgroups established by the association cover the topics of Research and Brick, as well as Tourism and Marketing.

Each year, the European Route of Brick Gothic participates in numerous events, including the European Year of Cultural Heritage, which was launched by the European Commission in 2018 with the motto “Sharing Heritage”. Since then, its network and activities have been ongoing, including a Europe-wide Day of Brick Gothic on every third Saturday in June.

The European Route of Brick Gothic publishes a cultural travel guide "Following the traces of the Middle Ages and the Hanseatic League". It can be ordered free of charge from the association's website.

== Members along the route ==
The route includes the following cities, towns, regions, municipalities and institutions (as of August 2022):

Denmark

- Løgumkloster

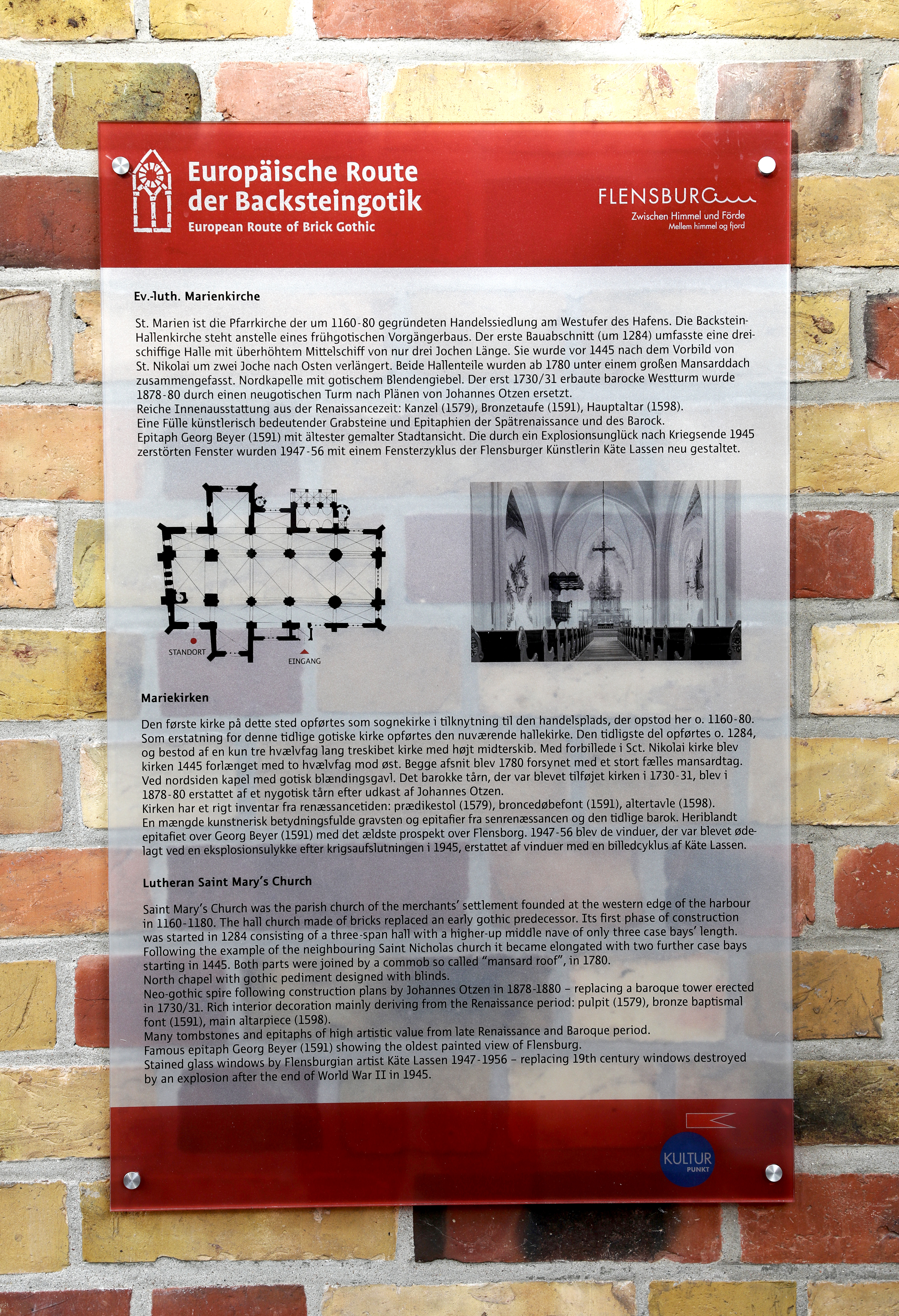
Building signage of the European Route of Brick Gothic

Germany

- Hanseatic city of Anklam
- Bad Doberan
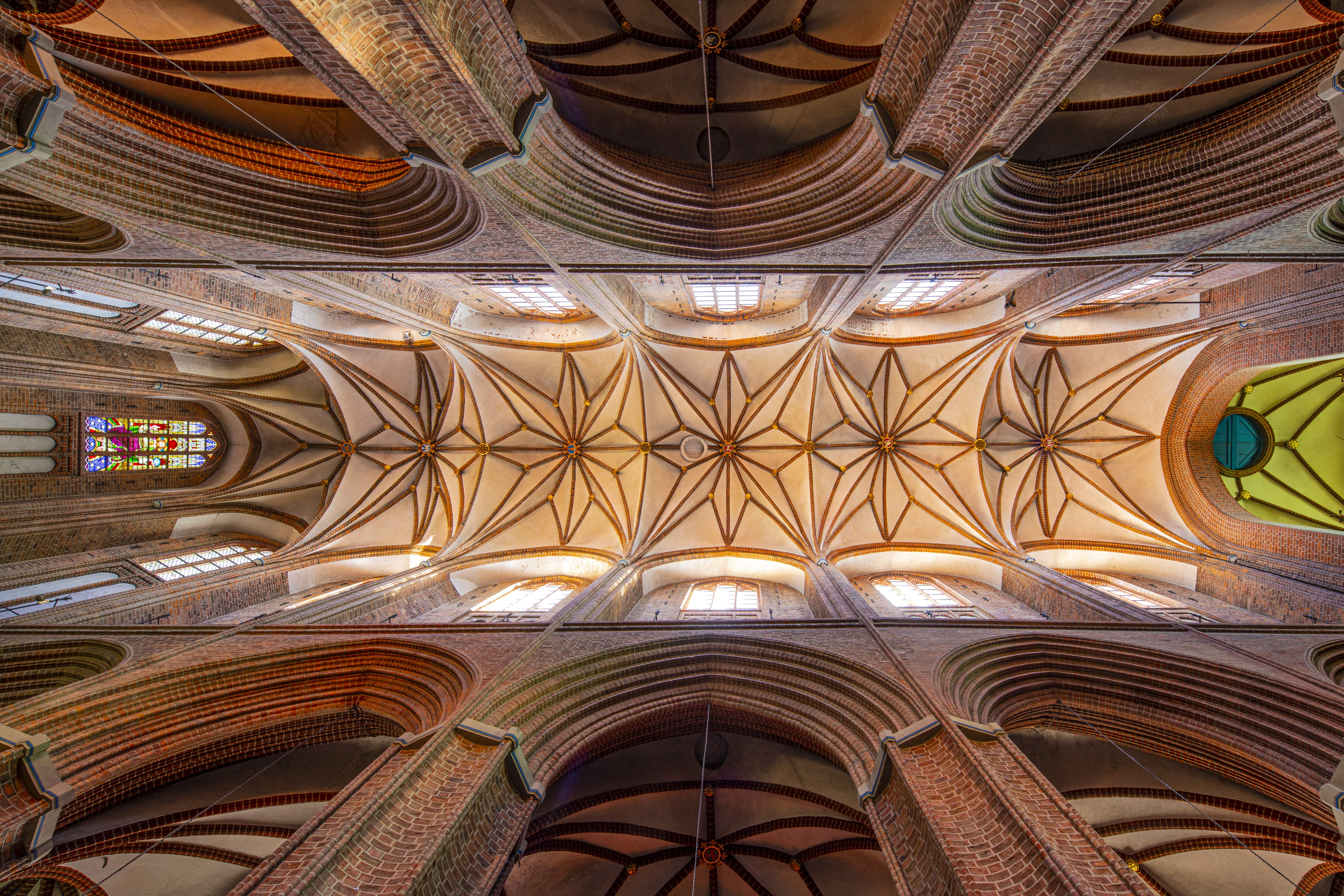
- Lüneburg, St. Nicolai © EuRoB, Eiko Wenzel
  Brandenburg
- Hanseatic city of Buxtehude
- Bützow
- Eberswalde
- Flensburg
- Frankfurt (Oder)
- Hanseatic city of Greifswald
- Güstrow
- Jüterbog
- Hanseatic city of Lüneburg with Bardowick and church district of Lüneburg
- Neubrandenburg with Burg Stargard
- Neukloster
- Parchim
- Pasewalk
- Prenzlau
- Ribnitz-Damgarten
- Hanseatic city of Rostock
- Hanseatic city of Stendal
- Hanseatic city of Stralsund
- Hanseatic city of Tangermünde
- Wolgast

Buildings

- Chorin Monastery
- St. Mary's Church in Hanseatic city of Lübeck
- St. Nicholas’ Church in Hanseatic city of Wismar
- 5 Lüneburg convents (Ebstorf, Isenhagen, Lüne, Medingen and Wienhausen)

Regions

- Mecklenburg-Vorpommern

Poland

- Chełmno
- Gdańsk
- Grudziądz
- Myślibórz
- Olsztyn
- Płock
- Sławno
- Toruń

Private individuals as well as businesses and institutions also support the work of the association. The headquarter of the EuRoB organization is located in Berlin.

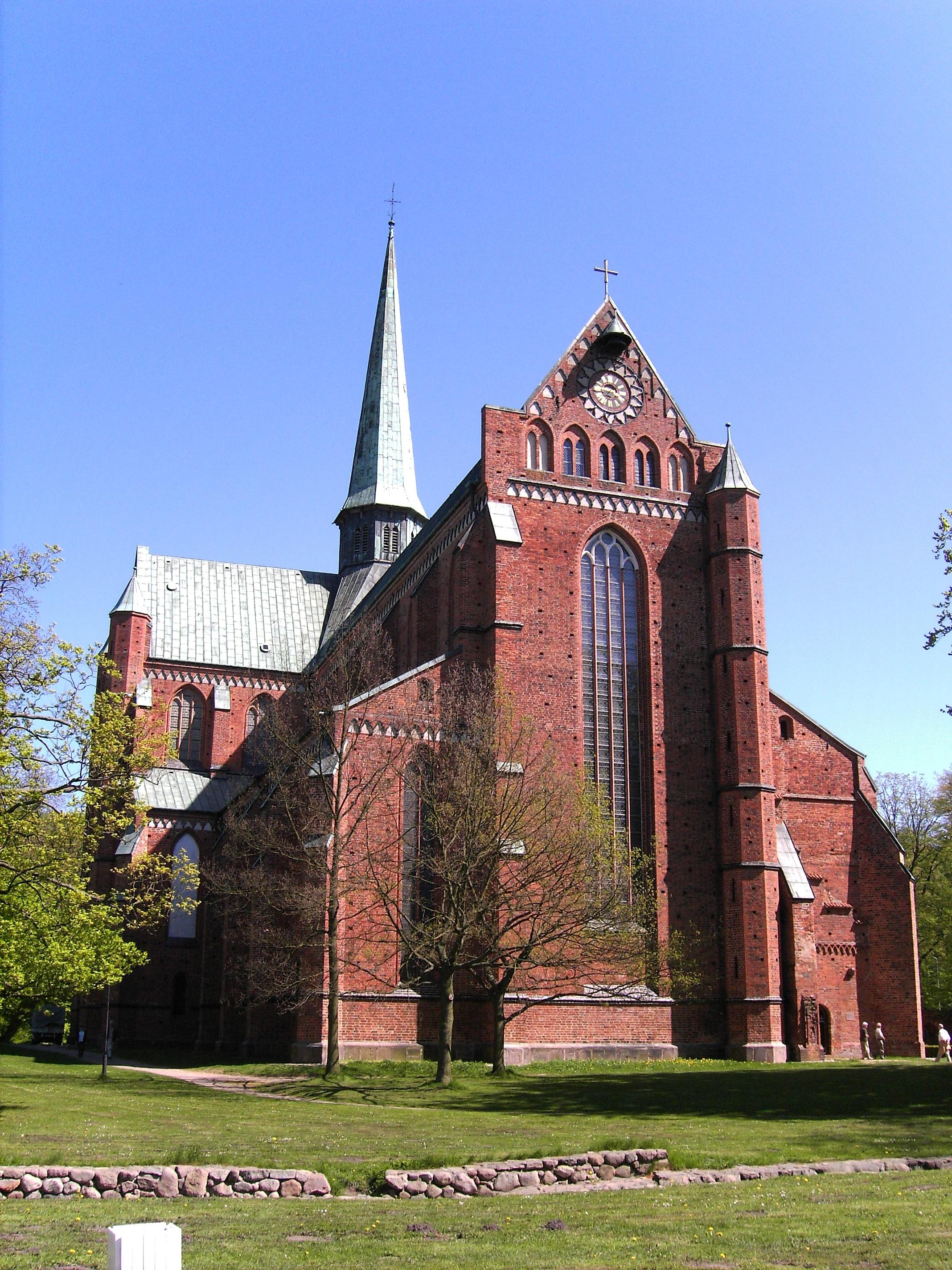
Doberan Minster in Bad Doberan

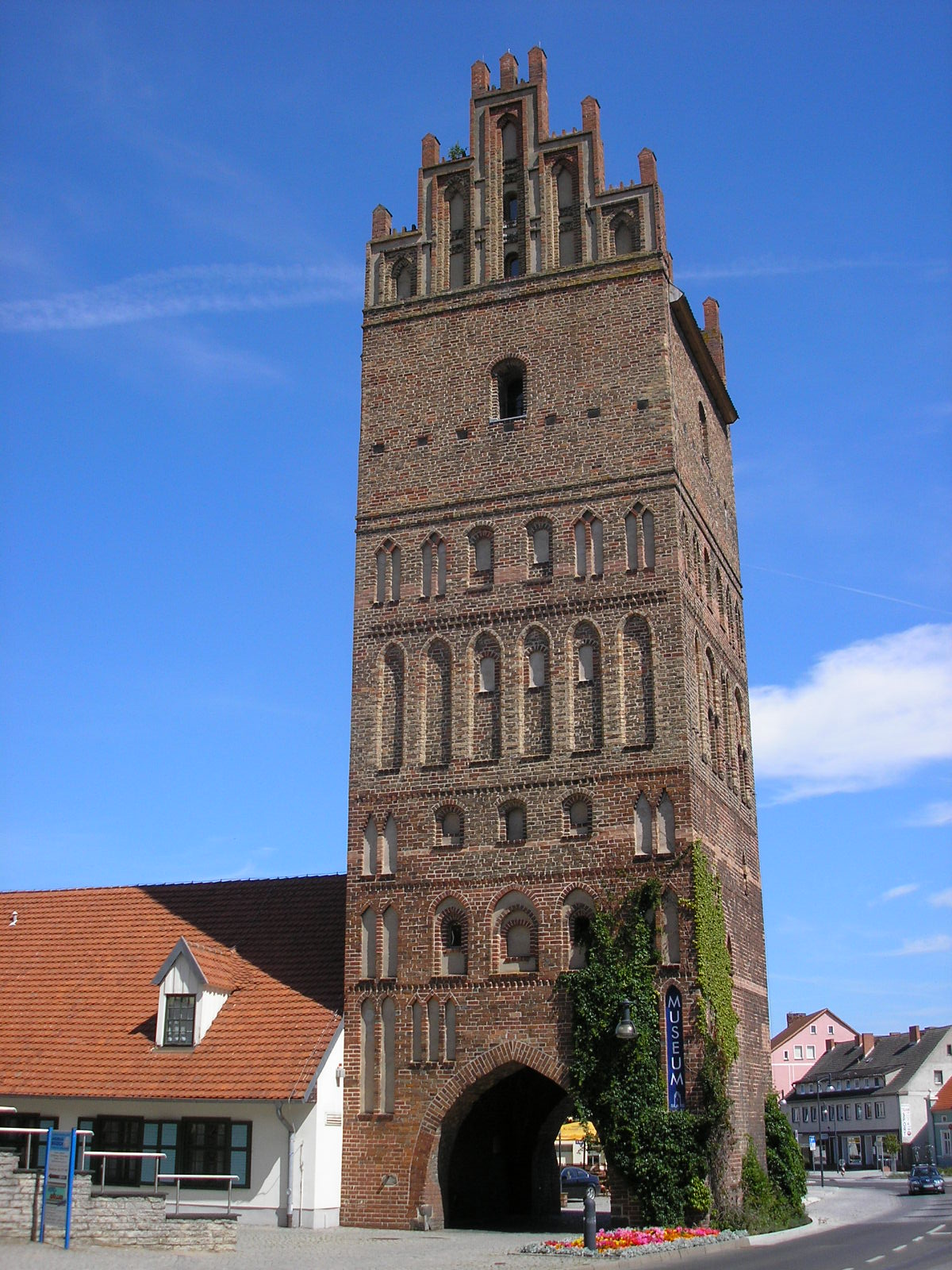
Steintor in Anklam

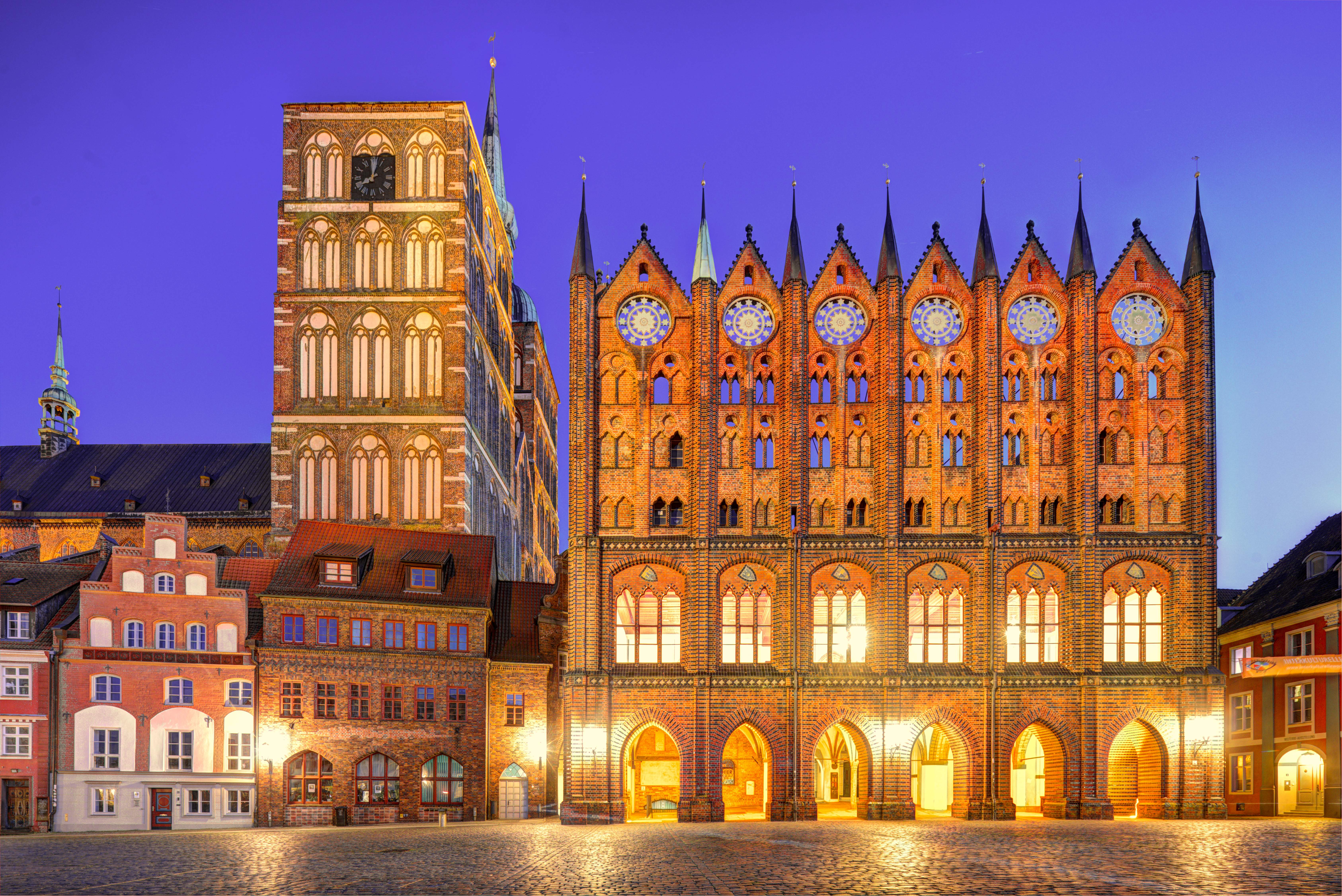
Stralsund, Town Hall and St. Nikolai, Photo: Eiko Wenzel

== See also ==
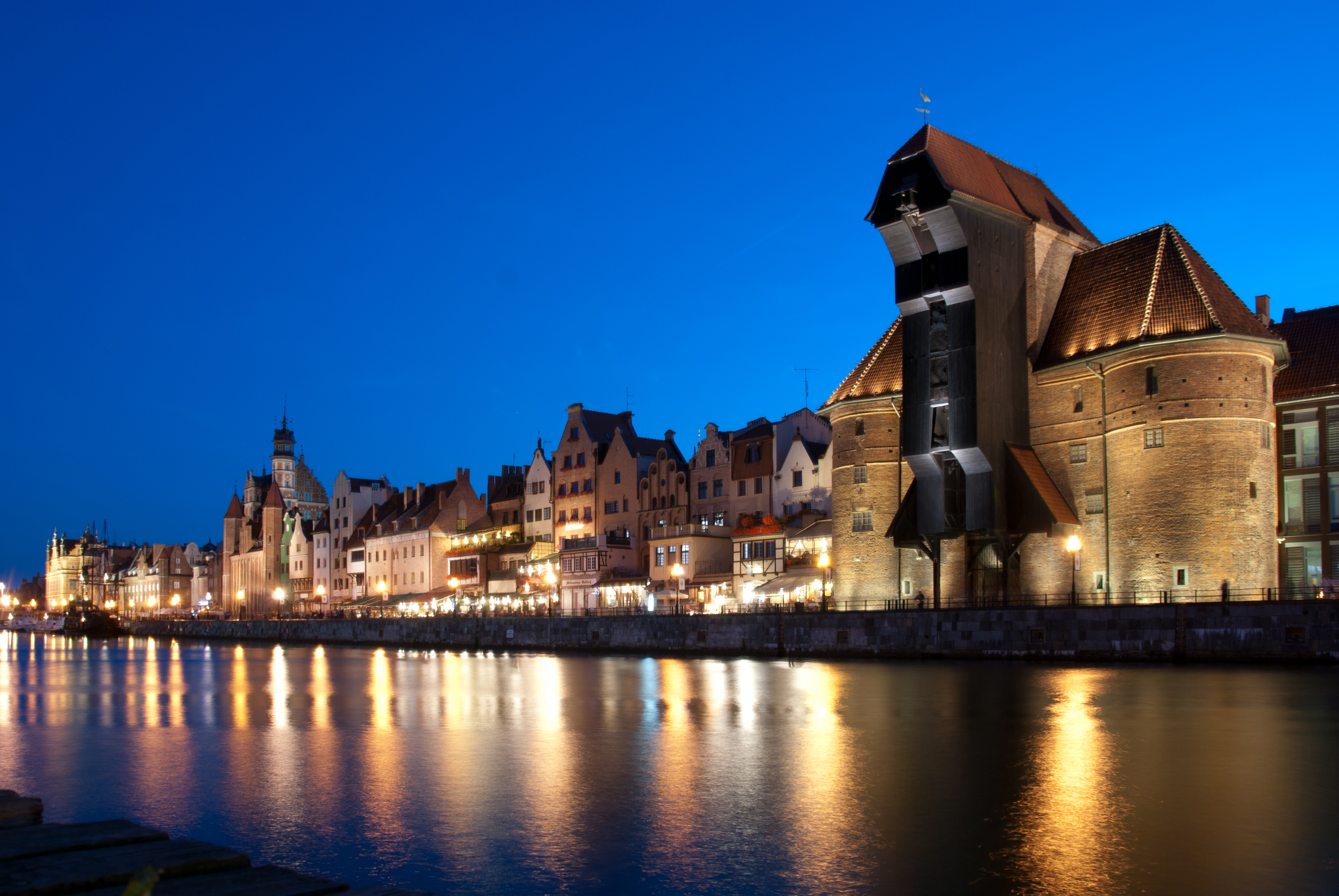
The medieval port crane, called Żuraw, over Motława river in Gdańsk

- List of Brick Gothic buildings

== Literature ==
- Gottfried Kiesow: Wege zur Backsteingotik. Eine Einführung. Monumente-Publikationen der Deutschen Stiftung Denkmalschutz, Bonn 2003, ISBN 3-936942-34-X
- Angela Pfotenhauer, Florian Monheim, Carola Nathan: Backsteingotik. Monumente-Edition. Monumente-Publikation der Deutschen Stiftung Denkmalschutz, Bonn 2000, ISBN 3-935208-00-6
- Gerlinde Thalheim (ed.) et al.: Gebrannte Größe - Wege zur Backsteingotik. 5 Vols. Monumente-Publikation der Deutschen Stiftung Denkmalschutz, Bonn, Gesamtausgabe aller 5 Bände unter ISBN 3-936942-22-6
- B. Busjan, G. Kiesow: Wismar: Bauten der Macht – Eine Kirchenbaustelle im Mittelalter. Monumente Publikationen der Deutschen Stiftung Denkmalschutz, 2002, ISBN 3-935208-14-6 (Vol. 2 of series of exhibition catalogues Wege zur Backsteingotik, ISBN 3-935208-12-X)
