= Friedrichswerth =

- Ortschaft of Nessetal
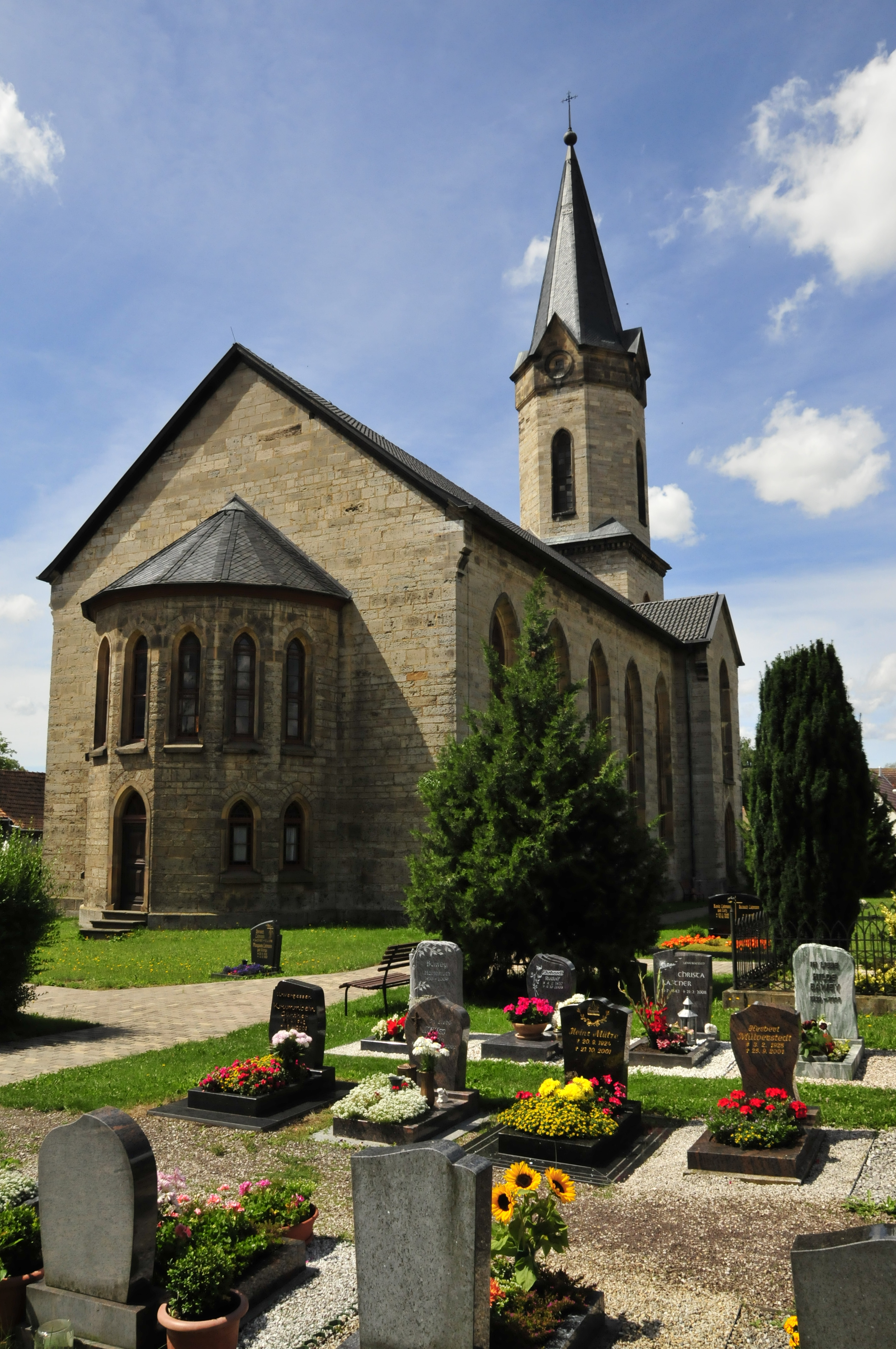
- Church

- Coat of arms
- Interactive map of Friedrichswerth
- Location within Germany Location within Thuringia
- Coordinates: 51°0′N 10°33′E
- Country: Germany
- State: Thuringia
- District: Gotha
- Municipality: Nessetal

Area
  - Total: 4.9 km^{2} (1.9 sq mi)
- Elevation: 255 m (837 ft)

Population (2017-12-31)
  - Total: 474
  - Density: 97/km^{2} (250/sq mi)
- Time zone: UTC+01:00 (CET)
  - Summer (DST): UTC+02:00 (CEST)
- Postal codes: 99869
- Dialling codes: 036254
- Website: gemeinde-nessetal.de

Friedrichswerth (German pronunciation: [ˈfʁiːdʁɪçsˌveːɐt]) is a village and Ortschaft of the municipality Nessetal in the district of Gotha, in Thuringia, Germany. Before 1 January 2019, when it was merged into the new municipality Nessetal, it was an independent municipality.
