= Bufleben =

- Ortschaft of Nessetal
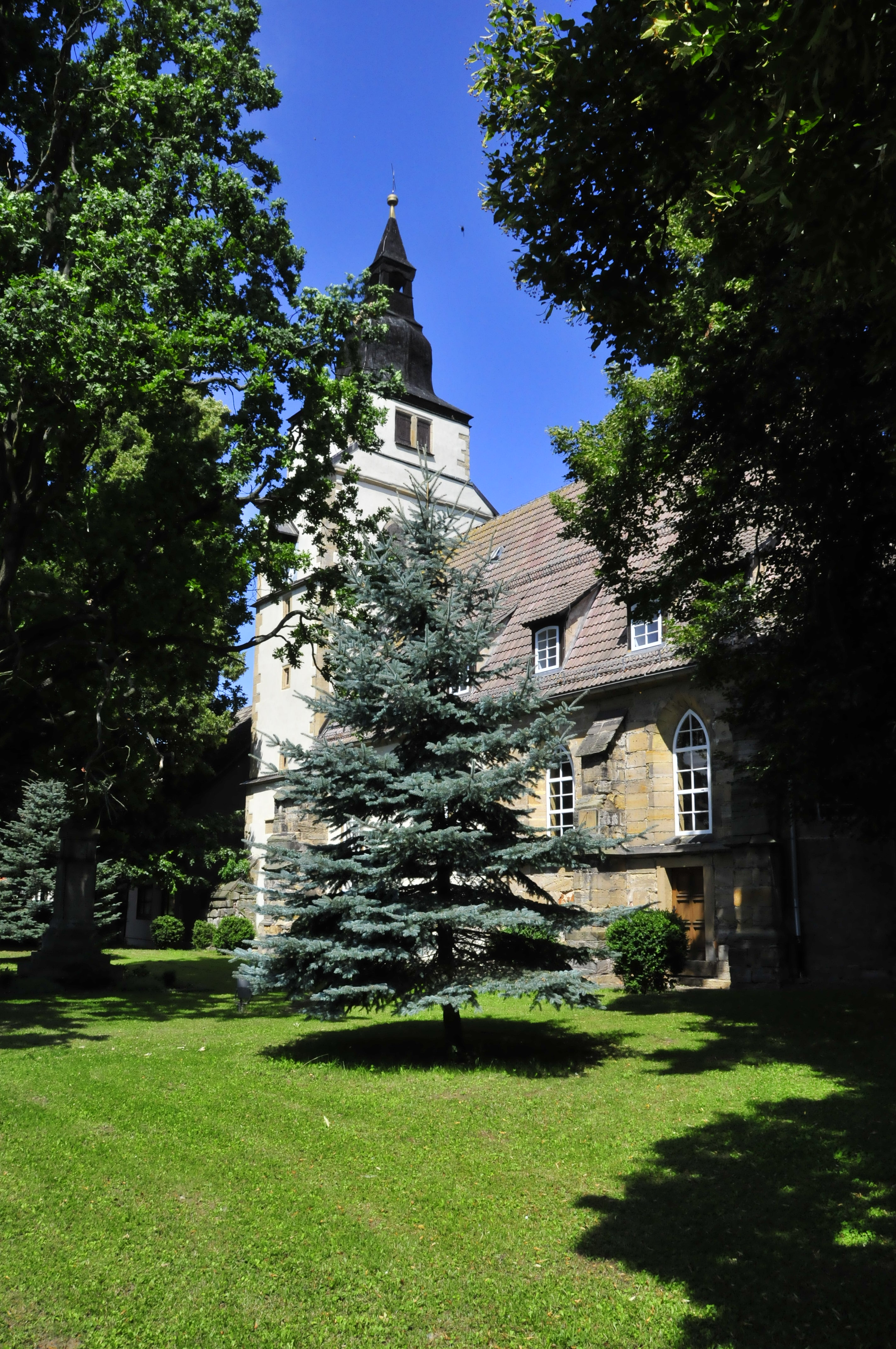
- Saint Cyriakus Church

- Coat of arms
- Interactive map of Bufleben
- Location within Germany Location within Thuringia
- Coordinates: 50°59′58″N 10°44′20″E
- Country: Germany
- State: Thuringia
- District: Gotha
- Municipality: Nessetal

Area
  - Total: 13.15 km^{2} (5.08 sq mi)
- Elevation: 285 m (935 ft)

Population (2017-12-31)
  - Total: 1,010
  - Density: 76.8/km^{2} (199/sq mi)
- Time zone: UTC+01:00 (CET)
  - Summer (DST): UTC+02:00 (CEST)
- Postal codes: 99869
- Dialling codes: 03621
- Vehicle registration: GTH
- Website: bufleben-nessetal.de

Bufleben (German pronunciation: [ˈbuːfleːbn̩]) is a village and Ortschaft of the municipality Nessetal in the district of Gotha, in Thuringia, Germany. Before 1 January 2019, when it was merged into the new municipality Nessetal, it was an independent municipality. The Ortschaft Bufleben consists of the villages (Ortsteile) Bufleben, Hausen and Pfullendorf.

== Notable people ==
- Cyriakus Schneegass (1546–1597), German Lutheran minister and hymnwriter
