= Goldbach, Thuringia =

Goldbach
- Ortschaft of Nessetal
- Coat of arms
- Interactive map of Goldbach
- Location within Germany Location within Thuringia
- Coordinates: 50°59′35″N 10°39′30″E
- Country: Germany
- State: Thuringia
- District: Gotha
- Municipality: Nessetal

Area
  - Total: 12.15 km^{2} (4.69 sq mi)
- Elevation: 270 m (890 ft)

Population (2017-12-31)
  - Total: 1,642
  - Density: 135.1/km^{2} (350.0/sq mi)
- Time zone: UTC+01:00 (CET)
  - Summer (DST): UTC+02:00 (CEST)
- Postal codes: 99869
- Dialling codes: 036255
- Vehicle registration: GTH

Goldbach (German pronunciation: [ˈɡɔltbax]) is a village and Ortschaft of the municipality Nessetal in the district of Gotha, in Thuringia, Germany. Before 1 January 2019, when it was merged into the new municipality Nessetal, it was an independent municipality.

== People from Goldbach ==
- Emil Lerp (1886–1966), German businessman and inventor of transportable gasoline chainsaw
