= Tröchtelborn =

- Municipality
- Location of Tröchtelborn within Gotha district
- Interactive map of Tröchtelborn
- Location within Germany Location within Thuringia
- Coordinates: 50°59′33″N 10°49′2″E
- Country: Germany
- State: Thuringia
- District: Gotha
- Municipal assoc.: Nesseaue

Government
  - Mayor (2022–28): Hartmut Brand (CDU)

Area
  - Total: 5.67 km^{2} (2.19 sq mi)
- Elevation: 310 m (1,020 ft)

Population (2025-12-31)
  - Total: 297
  - Density: 52.4/km^{2} (136/sq mi)
- Time zone: UTC+01:00 (CET)
  - Summer (DST): UTC+02:00 (CEST)
- Postal codes: 99869
- Dialling codes: 036258
- Vehicle registration: GTH
- Website: www.vg-nesseaue.de

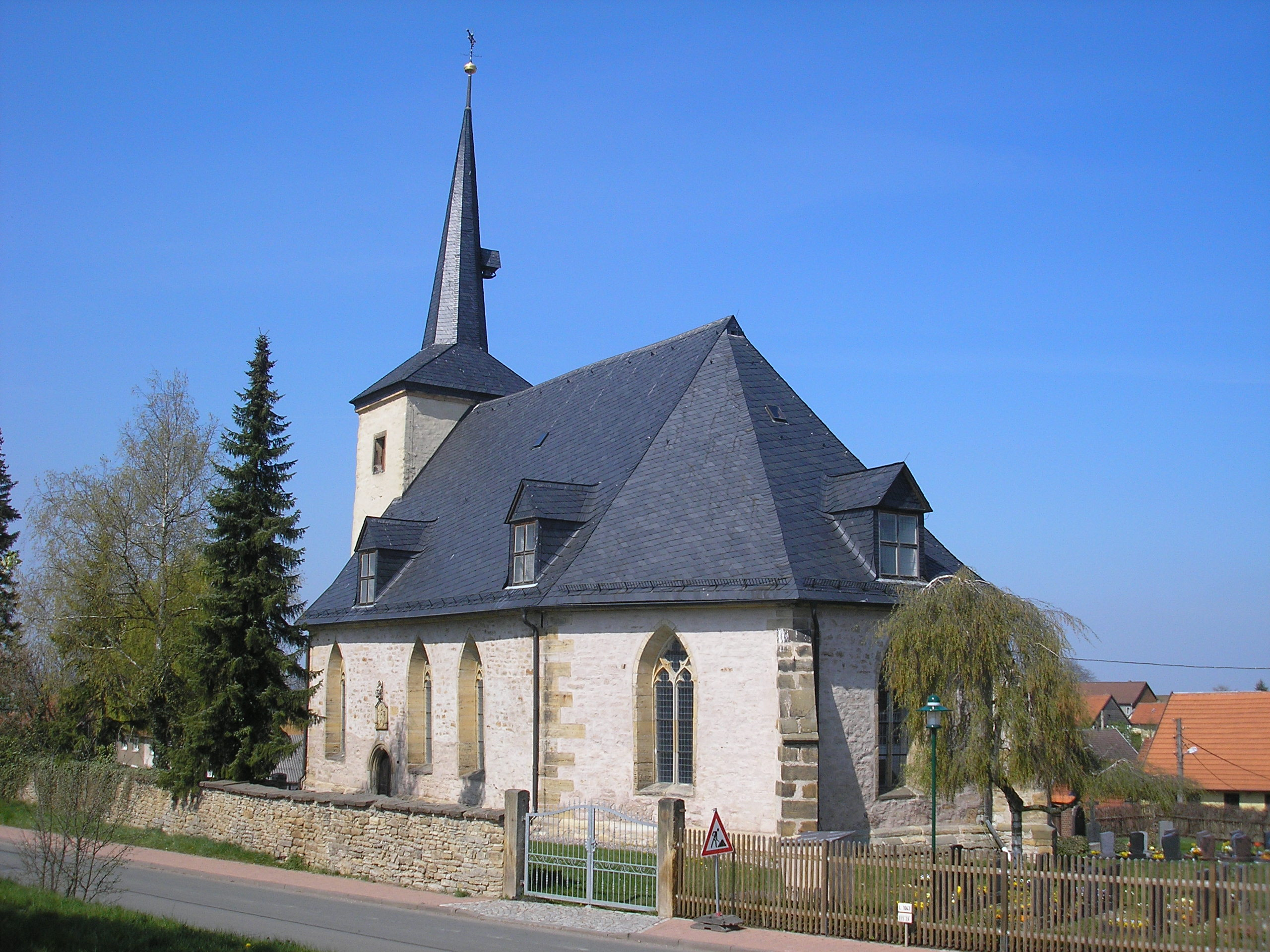
St. Boniface's Church

Tröchtelborn is a municipality in the municipal association Nesseaue in the Thuringian district of Gotha.

== Geography ==
Tröchtelborn lies in the valley between the Fahnersche Höhen to the north and the Seeberge to the south-west, on a historic road linking Erfurt to Gotha. The neighbouring villages are (clockwise from Bienstädt in the north-east) Bienstädt, Zimmernsupra, Nottleben, Pferdingsleben, Friemar and Molschleben.

== History ==
Tröchtelborn lies in an old Germanic, previously Celtic settlement area. The place name is also of Germanic origin (born=source). It was first mentioned in a document from between 750 and 779. The city of Erfurt acquired Tröchtelborn in 1351 from the fiefdom of the Counts of Schwarzburg and incorporated it into the Vogtei Nottleben. From 1706 it was administered by the Amt Alach. In 1802, it became part of Prussia together with the Erfurt region and between 1807 and 1813 it became part of the French Principality of Erfurt. With the Congress of Vienna, the village returned to Prussia in 1815 and was incorporated into the district of Erfurt in the Prussian province of Saxony in 1816.

In April 1945, Tröchtelborn was shelled at night by American artillery. The church was badly damaged, as were a number of residential and farm buildings. There were no casualties among the population, who had taken refuge in the cellars. At the beginning of July 1945, the Americans handed Tröchtelborn, like the whole of Thuringia, over to the Red Army. It thus became part of the Soviet Occupation Zone and, in 1949, the GDR.

After the Peaceful Revolution and the reunification, urgently needed restoration work was carried out on the church and residential buildings. The largely preserved village image became attractive again, and the village green was also renewed and once again became the centre of the village. Club life was revitalised and a local history museum was set up.

In 2017, a team of volunteers unearthed a German Focke-Wulf Fw 190 fighter plane near Tröchtelborn, which was probably shot down on the 5th of April 1945. The mortal remains of the pilot, whose identity remained unknown, were buried in Gotha cemetery.

=== Population development ===
- 1994 – 354
- 1995 – 356
- 1996 – 359
- 1997 – 357
- 1998 – 342
- 1999 – 355
- 2000 – 344
- 2001 – 343
- 2002 – 337
- 2003 – 325
- 2004 – 333
- 2005 – 337
- 2006 – 343
- 2007 – 347
- 2008 – 337
- 2009 – 320
- 2010 – 311
- 2011 – 305
- 2012 – 317
- 2013 – 320
- 2014 – 306
- 2015 – 306
- 2016 – 309
- 2017 – 306
- 2018 – 303
- 2019 – 309
- 2020 – 304
- 2021 – 297
- 2022 – 300

Source: Thüringer Landesamt für Statistik

== Mayor ==
Hartmut Brand (CDU) was elected mayor in 1999 and confirmed in office in 2004, 2010, 2016 and 2022.

== Sights ==
- The post-Gothic St. Boniface's Church built between 1603 and 1605. It features a Baroque organ from Fraciscus Volckland.
- The half-timbered rectory with its idyllic garden is located not far from the church. From 1610 to 1621, it was the official residence of Michael Altenburg, pastor and composer of the early Baroque period. Altenburg's living room serves as a winter church for meetings and celebrations.
- The local history museum "Steinerthof" in Tröchtelborn was founded in 1996. A former small farm from the 19th century with a barn, stables and residential building was reconstructed using many of the original materials, such as the blue woad colour, brick slabs and limestone paving.
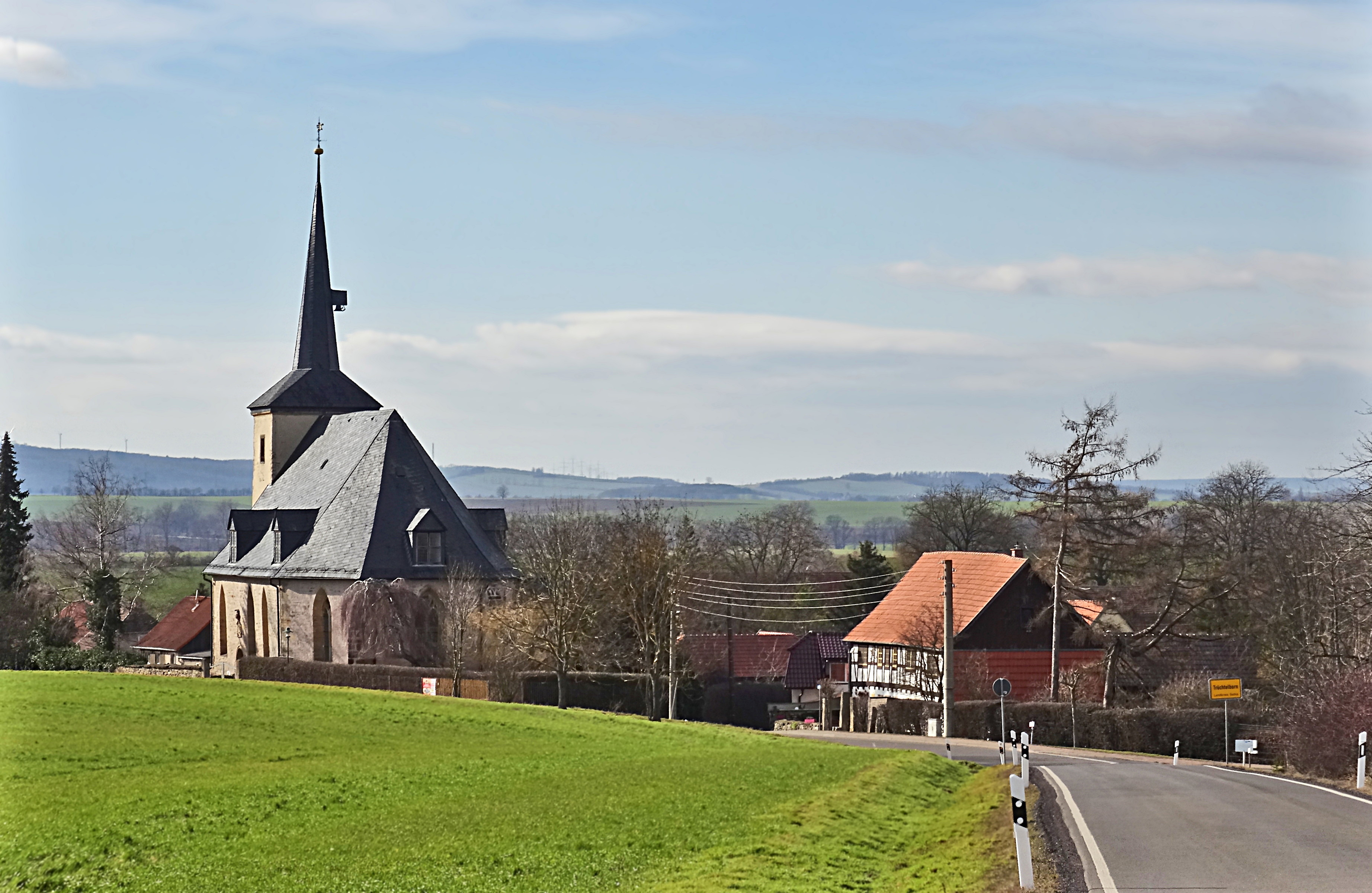
Church and rectory from the East

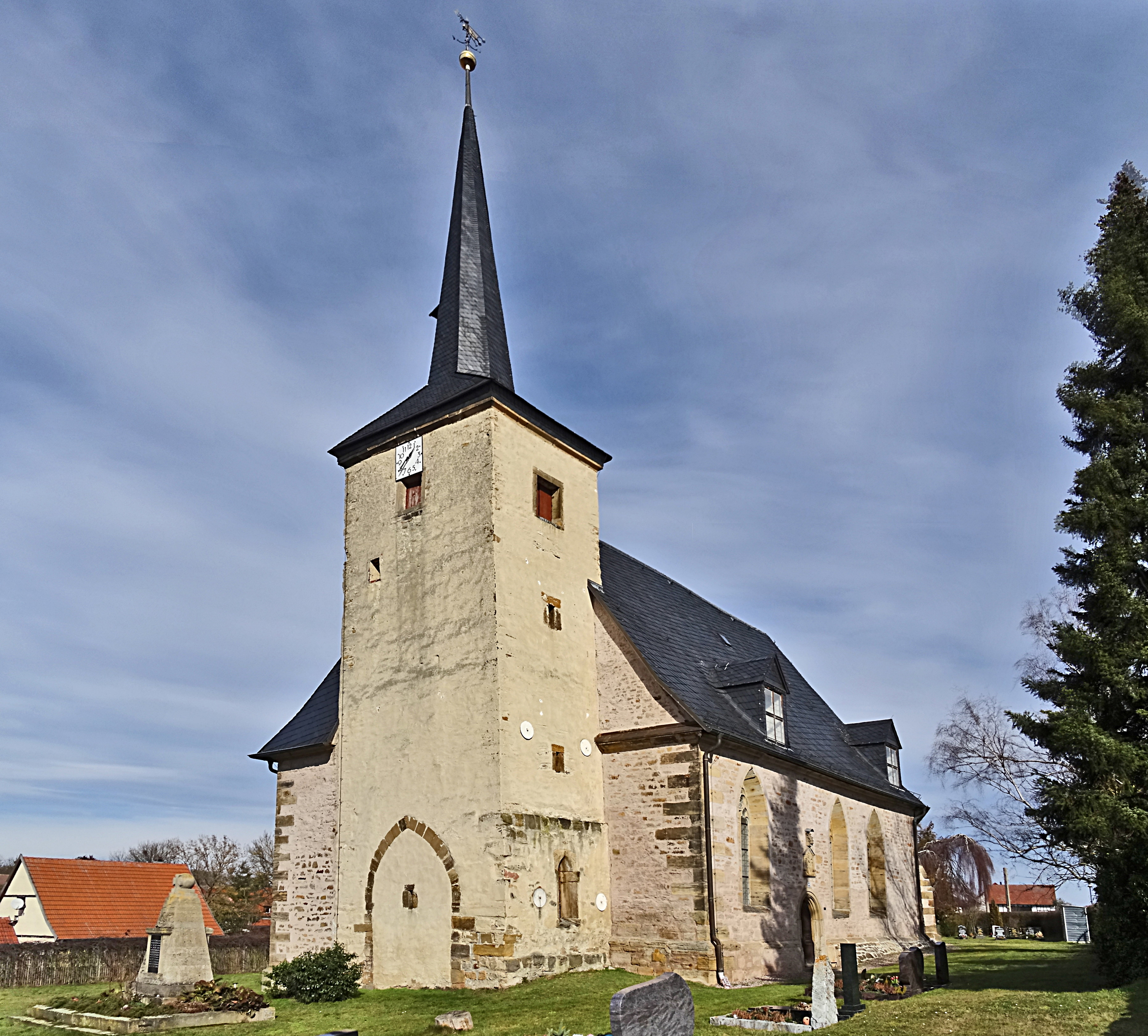
Church

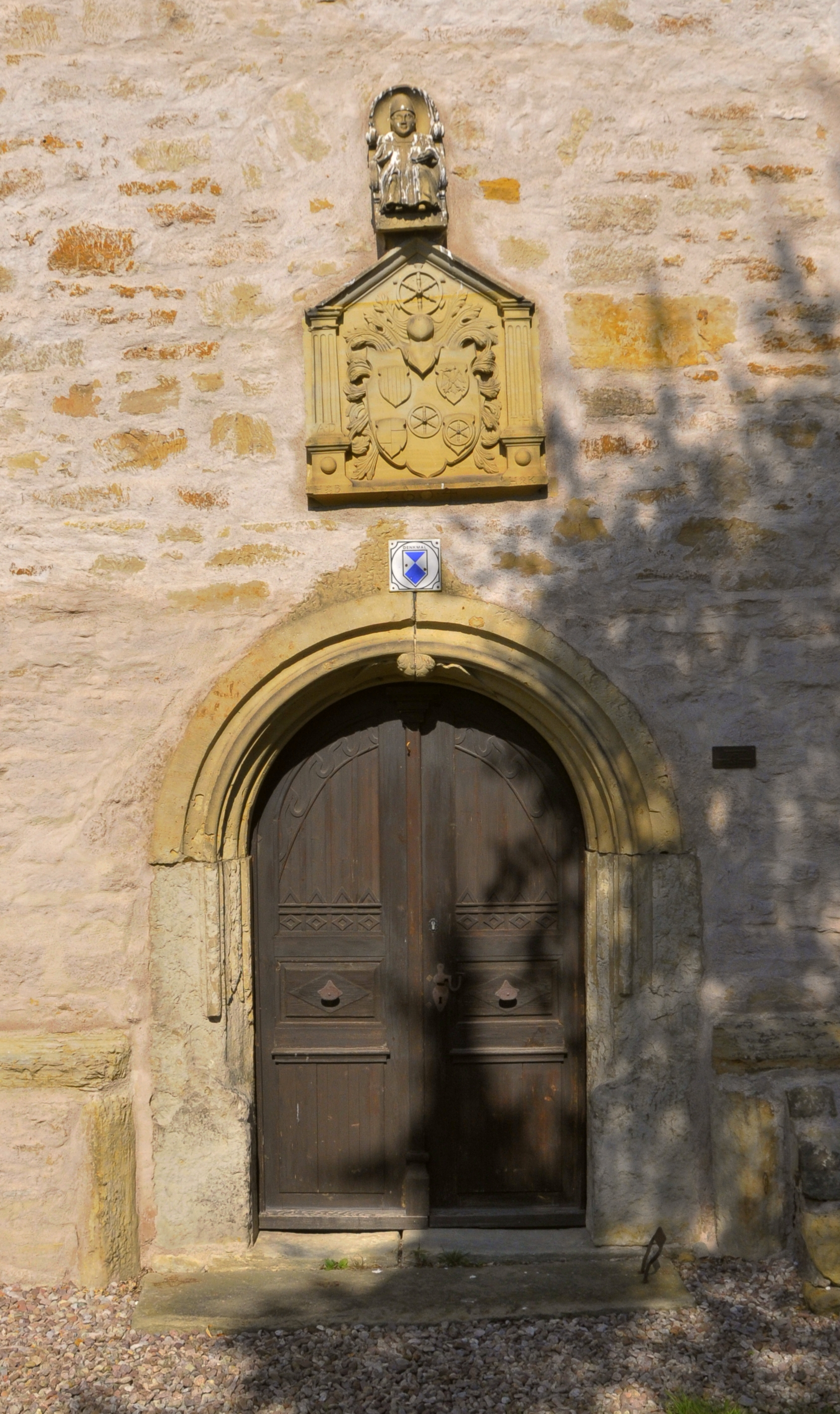
Side entrance of the church with coat of arms

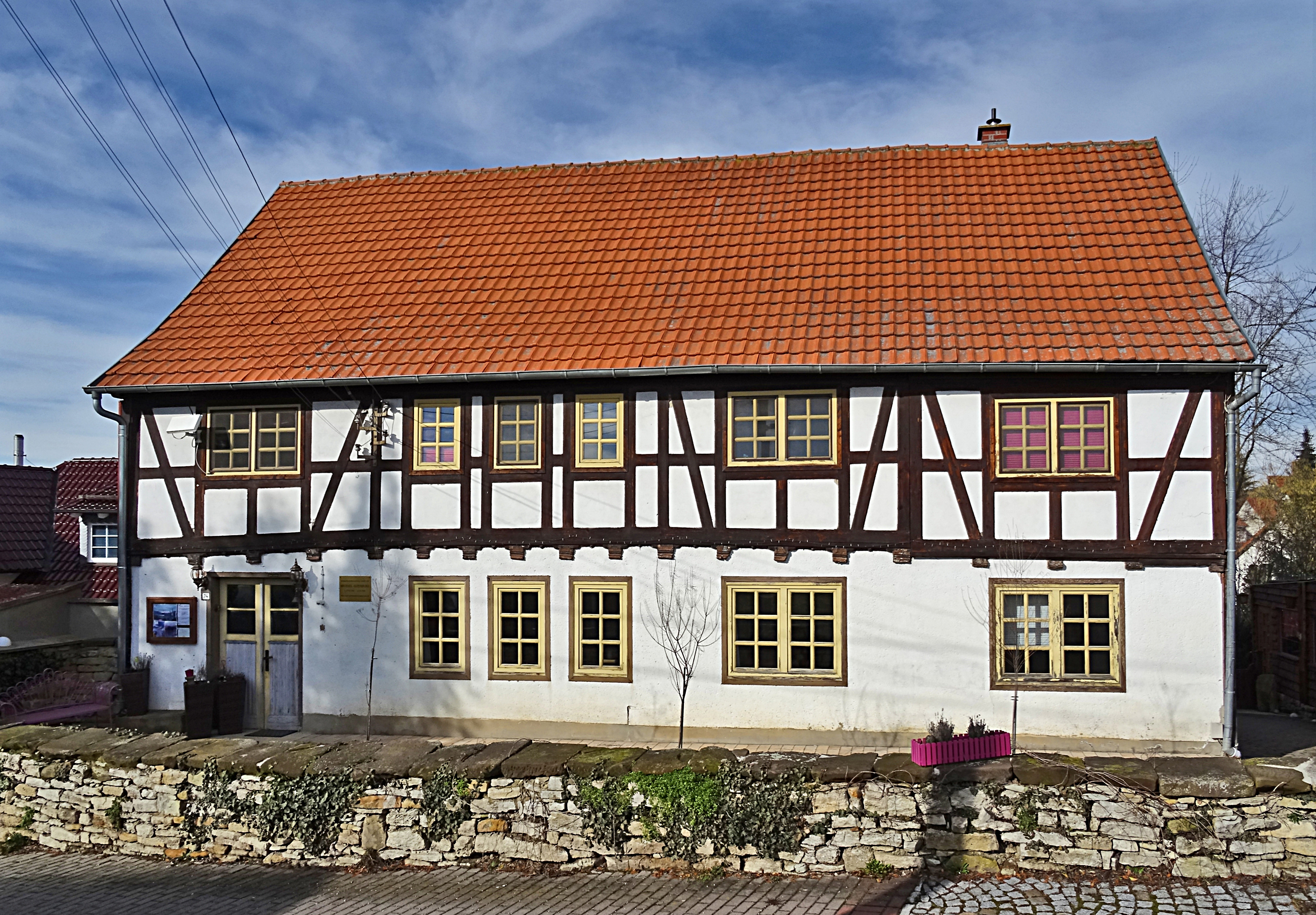
Rectory

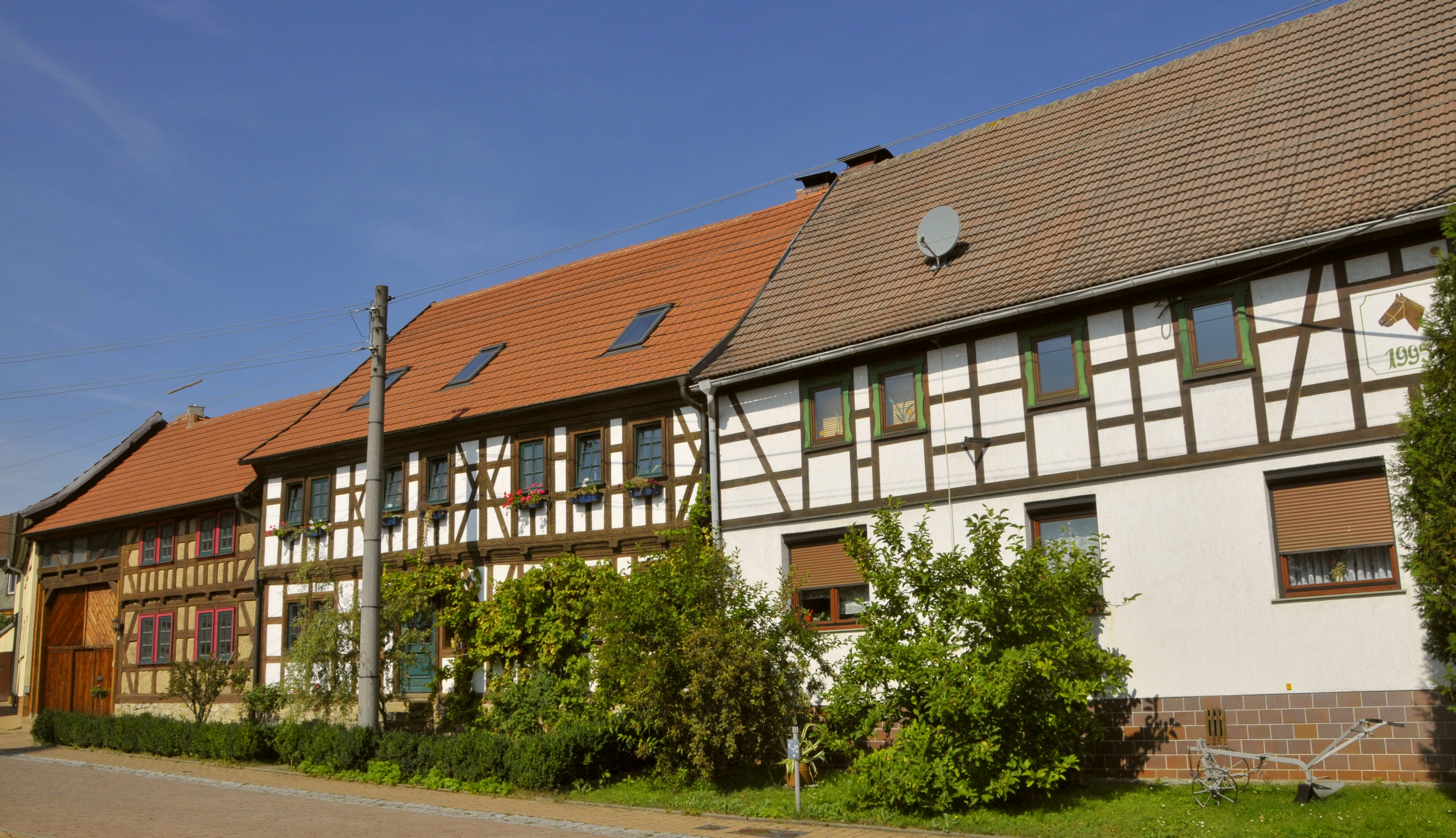
Half-timbered houses
