= Nesse-Apfelstädt-Gemeinden =

Coordinates: 50.917°N 10.917°E

Nesse-Apfelstädt-Gemeinden was a Verwaltungsgemeinschaft ("collective municipality") in the district of Gotha, in Thuringia, Germany. The seat of the Verwaltungsgemeinschaft was in Neudietendorf. The Verwaltungsgemeinschaft was disbanded on 1 December 2009.

The Verwaltungsgemeinschaft Nesse-Apfelstädt-Gemeinden consisted of the following municipalities:

1. Apfelstädt
2. Gamstädt
3. Ingersleben
4. Neudietendorf

These municipalities formed the new municipality Nesse-Apfelstädt.
