= Apfelstädtaue =

Coordinates: 50.817°N 10.667°E

Apfelstädtaue is a former Verwaltungsgemeinschaft ("collective municipality") in the district of Gotha, in Thuringia, Germany. It was disbanded in December 2019. The seat of the Verwaltungsgemeinschaft was in Georgenthal.

The Verwaltungsgemeinschaft Apfelstädtaue consisted of the following municipalities:

1. Emleben
2. Georgenthal
3. Herrenhof
4. Hohenkirchen
5. Petriroda
