= Grabsleben =

Village in Thuringia, Germany

- Ortsteil of Drei Gleichen
- Coat of arms
- Interactive map of Grabsleben
- Location within Germany Location within Thuringia
- Coordinates: 50°56′10″N 10°50′10″E
- Country: Germany
- State: Thuringia
- District: Gotha
- Town: Drei Gleichen

Area
  - Total: 13.83 km^{2} (5.34 sq mi)
- Elevation: 290 m (950 ft)

Population (2006-12-31)
  - Total: 1,062
  - Density: 76.79/km^{2} (198.9/sq mi)
- Time zone: UTC+01:00 (CET)
  - Summer (DST): UTC+02:00 (CEST)
- Postal codes: 99869
- Dialling codes: 036202
- Website: www.drei-gleichen.de

Grabsleben is a village and a former municipality in the district of Gotha, in Thuringia, Germany. Since 1 January 2009, it is part of the municipality Drei Gleichen.
