= Wandersleben =

- Ortsteil of Drei Gleichen
- Coat of arms
- Interactive map of Wandersleben
- Location within Germany Location within Thuringia
- Coordinates: 50°54′N 10°51′E
- Country: Germany
- State: Thuringia
- District: Gotha
- Town: Drei Gleichen

Area
  - Total: 12.63 km^{2} (4.88 sq mi)
- Elevation: 265 m (869 ft)

Population (2006-12-31)
  - Total: 1,679
  - Density: 132.9/km^{2} (344.3/sq mi)
- Time zone: UTC+01:00 (CET)
  - Summer (DST): UTC+02:00 (CEST)
- Postal codes: 99869
- Dialling codes: 036202
- Website: www.drei-gleichen.de

Wandersleben is a village and a former municipality in the district of Gotha, in Thuringia, Germany. Since 1 January 2009, it is part of the municipality Drei Gleichen.
