= Apfelstädt =

Apfelstädt may refer to:

- Apfelstädt (Nesse-Apfelstädt), a village in Thuringia, Germany, today part of Nesse-Apfelstädt
- Apfelstädt (river), of Thuringia, Germany
