= Andreas Armsdorff =

German composer and organist

- Born: 9 September 1670; Mühlberg, Thuringia
- Died: 31 December 1699 (aged 29)
- Era: Baroque

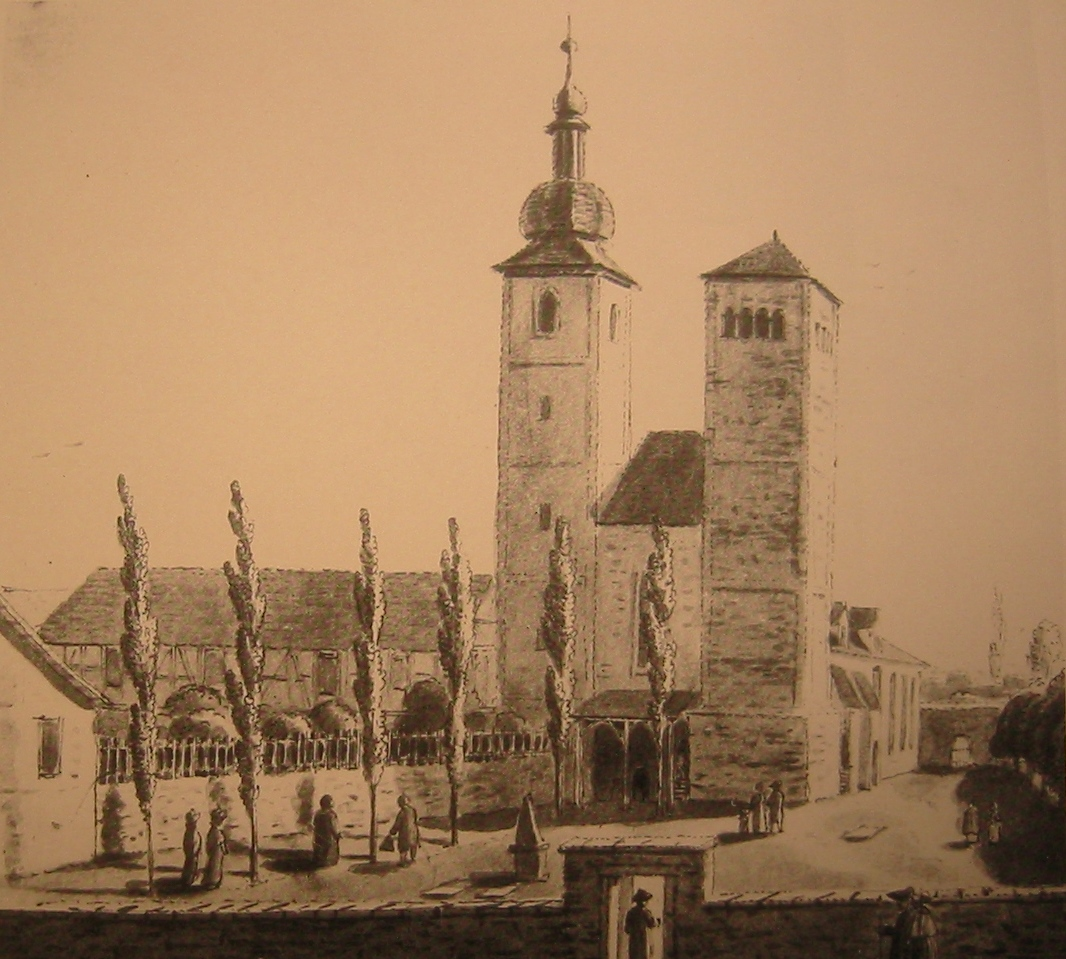
Reglerkirche Erfurt before 1900

Andreas Armsdorff (also Armsdorf; 9 September 1670 – 31 December 1699) was a German composer and organist. He was born in Mühlberg, near Gotha, and studied music and law. At some point in his early life he moved to nearby Erfurt where he may have studied with Johann Pachelbel. He worked as organist in various churches in Erfurt: Reglerkirche, Andreaskirche, and Kaufmannskirche. He died in Erfurt at the age of 29.

Armsdorff's early death was not an obstacle to the posthumous popularity of his music. His organ chorale preludes survive in numerous manuscript copies that circulated in Germany for decades after Armsdorff's death. Writing in 1758, Jakob Adlung praised Armsdorff's music as "agreeable to the ear." He was particularly known for his fugal writing, and traces of advanced imitative technique are present in the surviving works, particularly the two chorale preludes that employ the rare form of chorale canon: Allein Gott in der Höh and Es spricht der Unweisen Mund. Armsdorff mostly employed typical Central German chorale styles, however, in a few pieces he used the ornamented descant type, more widespread in the North (Allein zu dir, Herr Jesu Christ).

Today, some 30 chorale preludes for organ are the only surviving pieces by Armsdorff, although there is evidence of lost vocal works, as well as numerous keyboard pieces.
