= Seebergen =

- Ortsteil of Drei Gleichen
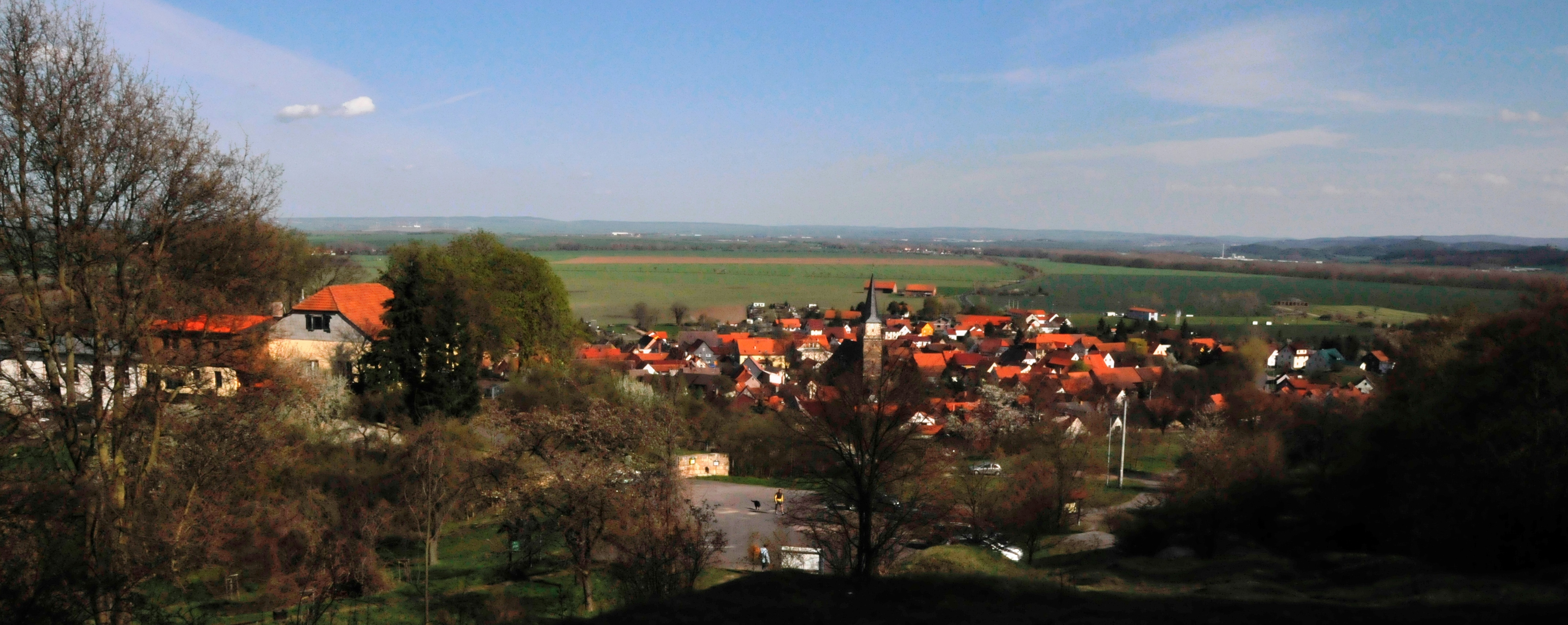
- Seebergen

- Coat of arms
- Interactive map of Seebergen
- Location within Germany Location within Thuringia
- Coordinates: 50°55′20″N 10°47′54″E
- Country: Germany
- State: Thuringia
- District: Gotha
- Town: Drei Gleichen

Area
  - Total: 8.88 km^{2} (3.43 sq mi)
- Elevation: 285 m (935 ft)

Population (2006-12-31)
  - Total: 1,311
  - Density: 148/km^{2} (382/sq mi)
- Time zone: UTC+01:00 (CET)
  - Summer (DST): UTC+02:00 (CEST)
- Postal codes: 99869
- Dialling codes: 036256
- Website: www.seebergen.info

Seebergen is a village and a former municipality in the district of Gotha, in Thuringia, Germany. Since 1 January 2009, it is part of the municipality Drei Gleichen.
