= Herrenhof =

- Ortsteil of Georgenthal
- Interactive map of Herrenhof
- Location within Germany Location within Thuringia
- Coordinates: 50°50′35″N 10°41′13″E
- Country: Germany
- State: Thuringia
- District: Gotha
- Municipality: Georgenthal

Area
  - Total: 4.38 km^{2} (1.69 sq mi)
- Elevation: 363 m (1,191 ft)

Population (2022-12-31)
  - Total: 726
  - Density: 166/km^{2} (429/sq mi)
- Time zone: UTC+01:00 (CET)
  - Summer (DST): UTC+02:00 (CEST)
- Postal codes: 99887
- Dialling codes: 036253

Herrenhof (German pronunciation: [ˈhɛʁənˌhoːf]) is a village and a former municipality in the district of Gotha, in Thuringia, Germany. On 1 January 2024 it became part of the municipality Georgenthal.
