= Fahner Höhe =

Municipal association in Thuringia, Germany

- Verwaltungsgemeinschaft
- Map of Gotha highlighting Fahner Höhe
- Interactive map of Fahner Höhe
- Location within Germany Location within Thuringia
- Coordinates: 51°04′N 10°51′E
- Country: Germany
- State: Thuringia
- District: Gotha
- Seat: Tonna
- Subdivisions: 5 municipalities

Area
  - Total: 78.61 km^{2} (30.35 sq mi)

Population (2025-12-31)
  - Total: 7,081
  - Density: 90.08/km^{2} (233.3/sq mi)
- Time zone: UTC+01:00 (CET)
  - Summer (DST): UTC+02:00 (CEST)
- Website: www.vg-fahner-hoehe.de

Fahner Höhe is a Verwaltungsgemeinschaft ("collective municipality") in the district of Gotha, in Thuringia, Germany. The seat of the Verwaltungsgemeinschaft is in Tonna.

The Verwaltungsgemeinschaft Fahner Höhe consists of the following municipalities:

1. Dachwig
2. Döllstädt
3. Gierstädt
4. Großfahner
5. Tonna
