= Bad Tabarz =

- Municipality
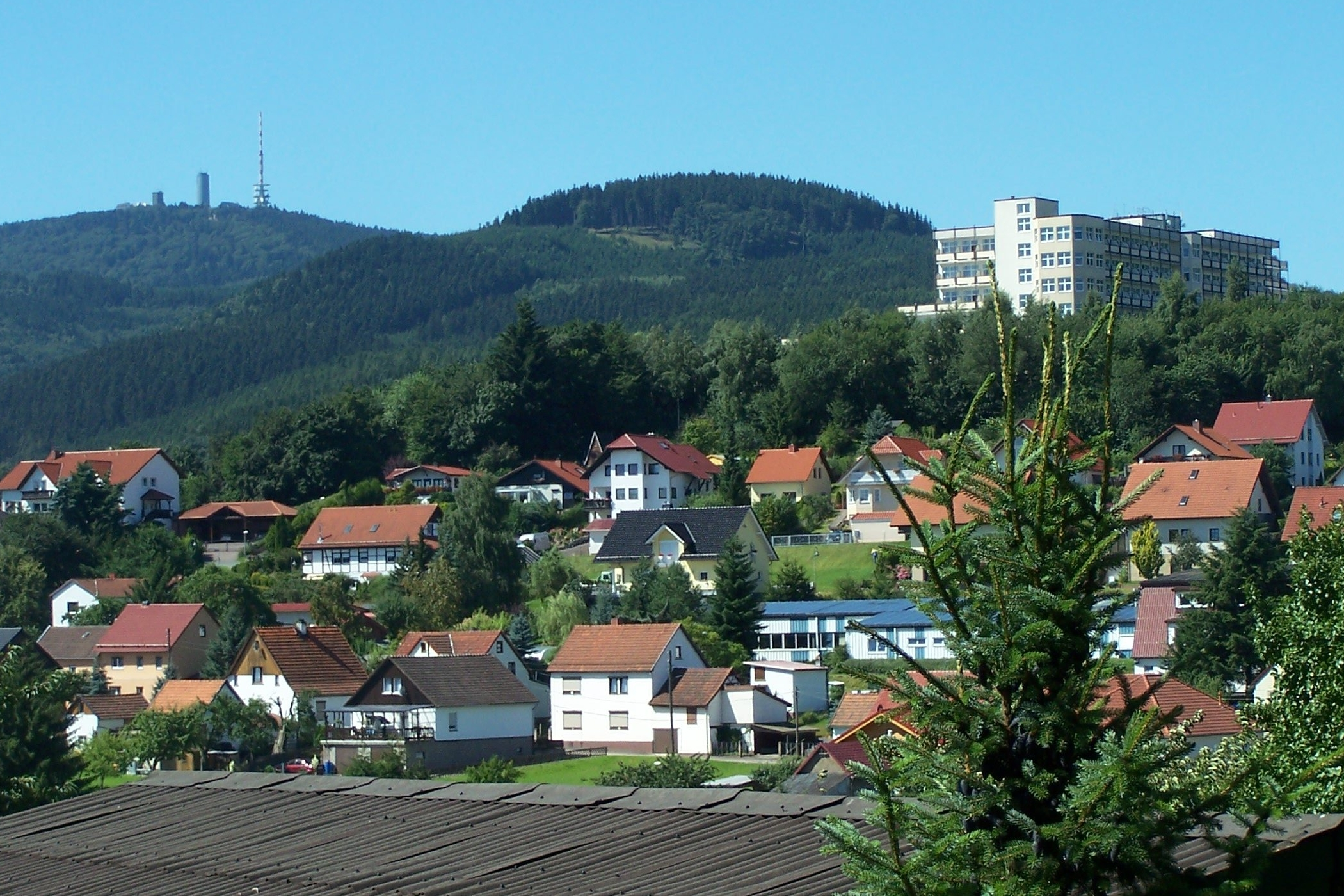
- View on the municipal part of Cabarz

- Coat of arms

- Location of Bad Tabarz within Gotha district
- Interactive map of Bad Tabarz
- Location within Germany Location within Thuringia
- Coordinates: 50°52′57″N 10°30′48″E
- Country: Germany
- State: Thuringia
- District: Gotha

Government
  - Mayor (2020–26): David Ortmann

Area
  - Total: 21.15 km^{2} (8.17 sq mi)
- Elevation: 394–916 m (1,293–3,005 ft)

Population (2025-12-31)
  - Total: 3,973
  - Density: 187.8/km^{2} (486.5/sq mi)
- Time zone: UTC+01:00 (CET)
  - Summer (DST): UTC+02:00 (CEST)
- Postal codes: 99891
- Dialling codes: 036259
- Vehicle registration: GTH
- Website: bad-tabarz.de

Bad Tabarz is a municipality in the district of Gotha, in Thuringia, Germany. It is a winter sports resort and the terminus of the Thüringerwaldbahn rural tramway.
