= Dachwig =

- Municipality
- Location of Dachwig within Gotha district
- Interactive map of Dachwig
- Location within Germany Location within Thuringia
- Coordinates: 51°4′N 10°50′E
- Country: Germany
- State: Thuringia
- District: Gotha
- Municipal assoc.: Fahner Höhe

Government
  - Mayor (2022–28): Volker Aschenbach (SPD)

Area
  - Total: 12.66 km^{2} (4.89 sq mi)
- Elevation: 172 m (564 ft)

Population (2025-12-31)
  - Total: 1,614
  - Density: 127.5/km^{2} (330.2/sq mi)
- Time zone: UTC+01:00 (CET)
  - Summer (DST): UTC+02:00 (CEST)
- Postal codes: 99100
- Dialling codes: 036206
- Vehicle registration: GTH

Dachwig is a municipality in the district of Gotha, in Thuringia, Germany.
