= Hohenkirchen, Thuringia =

Hohenkirchen
- Ortsteil of Georgenthal
- Coat of arms
- Interactive map of Hohenkirchen
- Location within Germany Location within Thuringia
- Coordinates: 50°50′55″N 10°42′4″E
- Country: Germany
- State: Thuringia
- District: Gotha
- Municipality: Georgenthal

Area
  - Total: 6.81 km^{2} (2.63 sq mi)
- Elevation: 350 m (1,150 ft)

Population (2018-12-31)
  - Total: 708
  - Density: 104/km^{2} (269/sq mi)
- Time zone: UTC+01:00 (CET)
  - Summer (DST): UTC+02:00 (CEST)
- Postal codes: 99887
- Dialling codes: 036253
- Vehicle registration: GTH
- Website: georgenthal.de

Hohenkirchen (German pronunciation: [hoːənˈkɪʁçn̩]) is a village and a former municipality in the district of Gotha, in Thuringia, Germany. Since December 2019, it is part of the municipality Georgenthal.

== People ==
- Georg Böhm (1661-1733), composer and organist
