= Neudietendorf =

- Ortschaft of Nesse-Apfelstädt
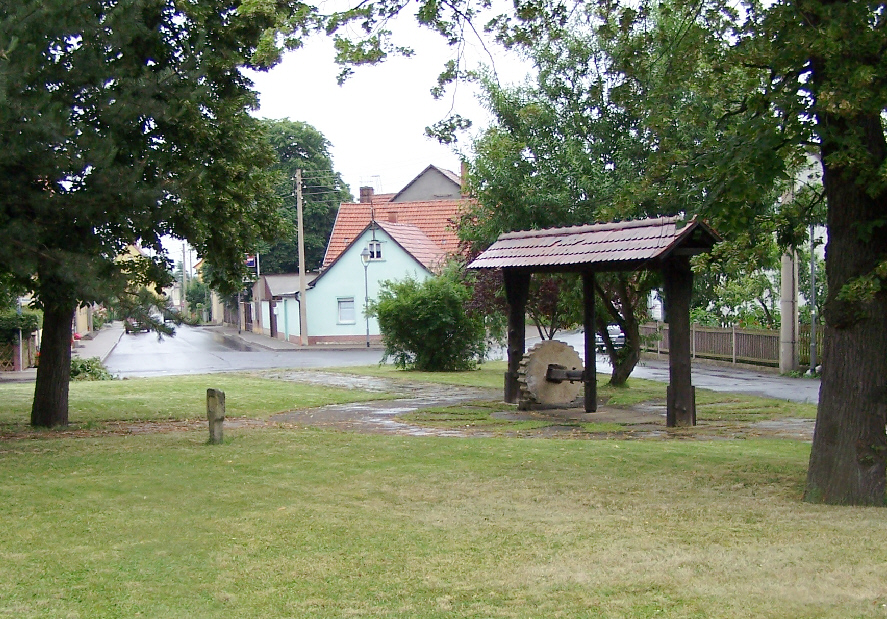
- The old millstone in the village's part Dietendorf

- Coat of arms

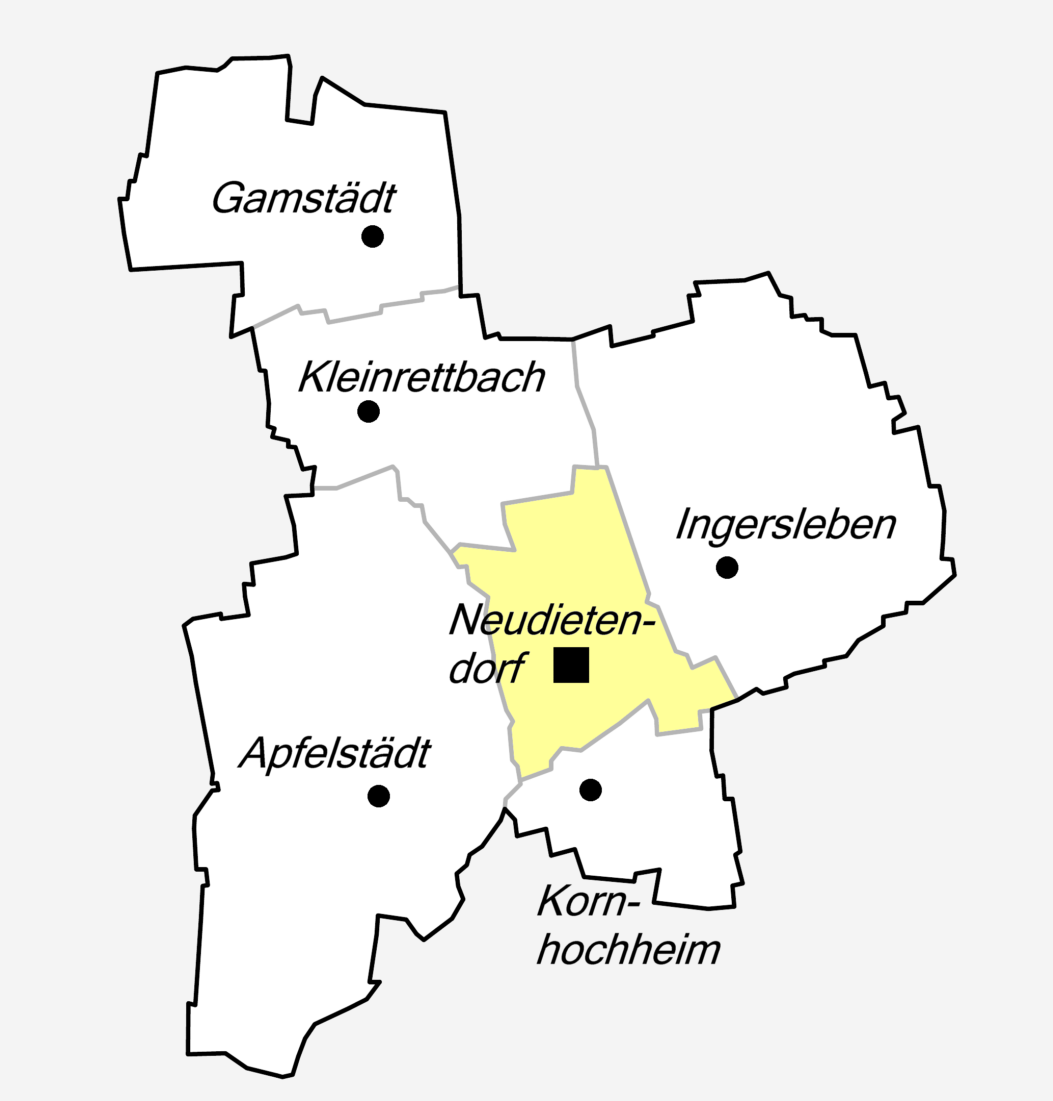
- Neudietendorf within Nesse-Apfelstädt
- Interactive map of Neudietendorf
- Location within Germany Location within Thuringia
- Coordinates: 50°54′45″N 10°54′48″E
- Country: Germany
- State: Thuringia
- District: Gotha
- Municipality: Nesse-Apfelstädt
- First mentioned: 1147

Area
  - Total: 6.66 km^{2} (2.57 sq mi)
- Elevation: 242 m (794 ft)

Population (2009)
  - Total: 2,181
  - Density: 327/km^{2} (848/sq mi)
- Time zone: UTC+01:00 (CET)
  - Summer (DST): UTC+02:00 (CEST)
- Postal codes: 99192
- Dialling codes: 036202
- Website: nesse-apfelstaedt.de

Neudietendorf (German pronunciation: [nɔʏˈdiːtn̩dɔʁf], lit. 'New Dietendorf') is a village and a former municipality in the district of Gotha, in Thuringia, central Germany. Since 1 December 2009, it has been part of the municipality Nesse-Apfelstädt, of which it is an Ortschaft. The former municipality also contained the village and current Ortschaft Kornhochheim. Since the concession signed by Duke Friedrich III on 27 March 1764, it has been the seat of a congregation of the Moravian Church (Moravian Brethren, Herrnhuter Brüdergemeine) who established well-known industries and schools in their settlement.
