= Johann Christian Wilhelm Augusti =

Johann Christian Wilhelm Augusti (27 October 1772 – 28 April 1841) was a German theologian.

== Life ==
He was born at Eschenbergen, near Gotha, Augusti was of Jewish descent, his grandfather having been a converted rabbi. He was educated at the gymnasium of Gotha and the University of Jena. At Jena he studied oriental languages, of which he became a professor there in 1803. Subsequently, he was professor of theology (1812), and for a time rector, at the University of Breslau. In 1819 he transferred as a professor of theology to the University of Bonn. In 1828 he was appointed chief member of the consistorial council at Koblenz. There he was afterwards made director of the Rhenish Consistory of the Evangelical Church in Prussia. He died at Koblenz.

Augusti had little sympathy with the modern philosophical interpretations of dogma, and he held to the traditional faith. His works on theology (Lehrbuch Der Christlichen Dogmengeschichte, 1805) are simple statements of fact; they do not attempt a speculative treatment of their subjects. In 1809 he published in conjunction with WML de Wette a new translation of the Old Testament. His other works include, Grundriss einer historisch-kritischen Einleitung in's Alte Testament (1806), Exegetisches Handbuch des Alten Testaments (1797–1800) and an edition of Die Apochryphen des A. T. (1804).

In addition to these, his most important writings are the Denkwürdigkeiten aus der Christlichen Archäologie, 12 vols. (1817–1831), a partially digested class of materials, and the Handbuch der christlichen Archäologie, (1836–1837), which gives the substance of the larger work in a more compact and systematic form.
