= Luisenthal =

- Municipality
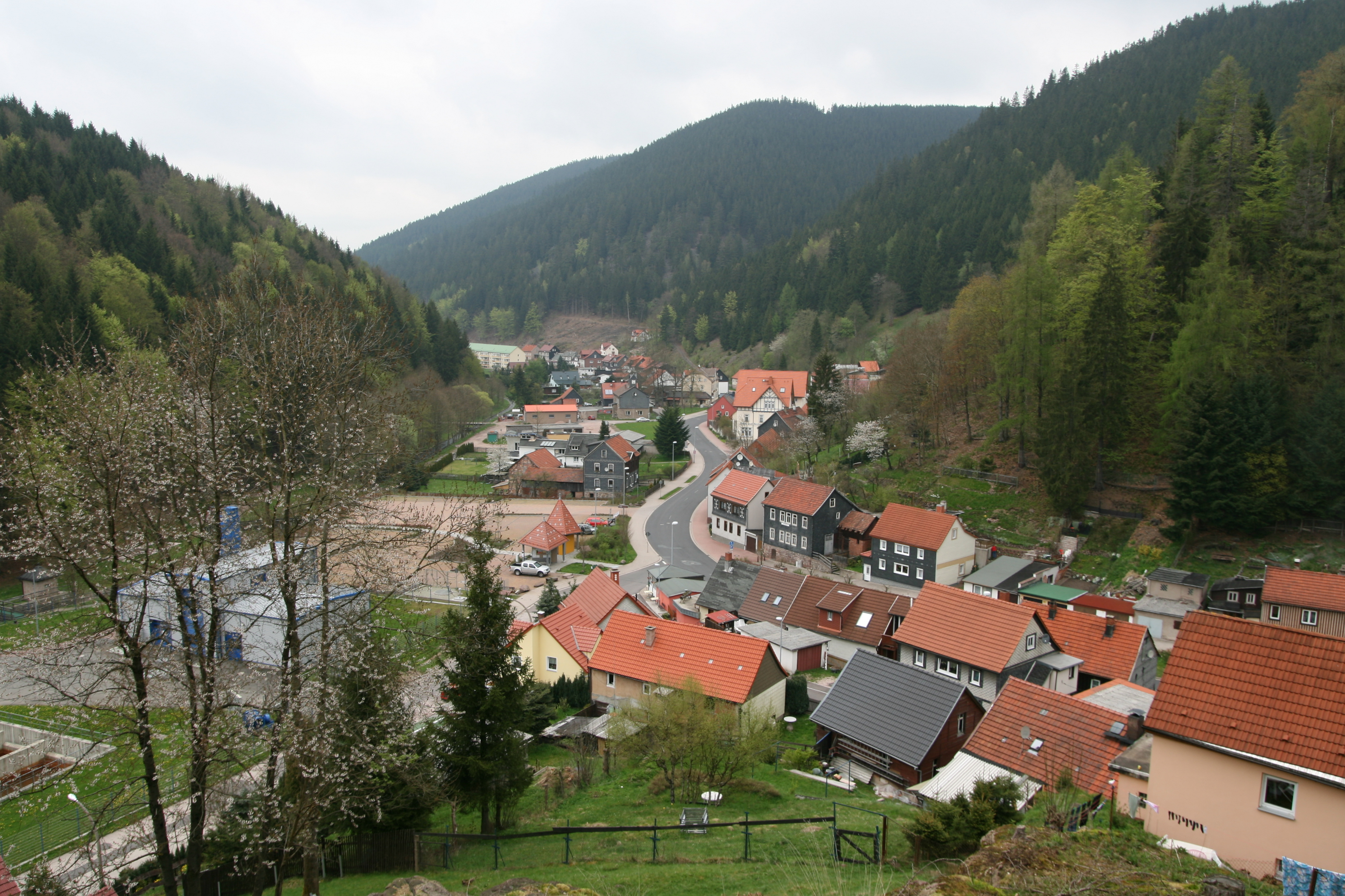
- Schwarzwald, southern part of Luisenthal

- Coat of arms

- Location of Luisenthal within Gotha district
- Interactive map of Luisenthal
- Location within Germany Location within Thuringia
- Coordinates: 50°47′5″N 10°43′18″E
- Country: Germany
- State: Thuringia
- District: Gotha

Government
  - Mayor (2022–28): Günther Jobst

Area
  - Total: 30.58 km^{2} (11.81 sq mi)
- Elevation: 450 m (1,480 ft)

Population (2025-12-31)
  - Total: 1,118
  - Density: 36.56/km^{2} (94.69/sq mi)
- Time zone: UTC+01:00 (CET)
  - Summer (DST): UTC+02:00 (CEST)
- Postal codes: 99885
- Dialling codes: 036257
- Vehicle registration: GTH
- Website: www.luisenthal.de

Luisenthal (German pronunciation: [luˈiːzn̩ˌtaːl], lit. 'Luise Valley') is a municipality in the district of Gotha, in Thuringia, Germany.
