= Tonna, Germany =

Tonna
- Municipality
- Coat of arms

- Location of Tonna within Gotha district
- Interactive map of Tonna
- Location within Germany Location within Thuringia
- Coordinates: 51°4′30″N 10°44′0″E
- Country: Germany
- State: Thuringia
- District: Gotha
- Municipal assoc.: Fahner Höhe
- Subdivisions: 2

Government
  - Mayor (2022–28): Heiko Krtschil

Area
  - Total: 30.5 km^{2} (11.8 sq mi)
- Elevation: 180 m (590 ft)

Population (2025-12-31)
  - Total: 2,769
  - Density: 90.8/km^{2} (235/sq mi)
- Time zone: UTC+01:00 (CET)
  - Summer (DST): UTC+02:00 (CEST)
- Postal codes: 99958
- Dialling codes: 036042
- Vehicle registration: GTH
- Website: www.vg-fahner-hoehe.de

Tonna (German pronunciation: [ˈtɔna]) is a municipality in the district of Gotha, in Thuringia, Germany.

== People ==
- Georg Hirth (1841-1916), German art collector, journalist and writer
