= Schwabhausen, Thuringia =

Schwabhausen
- Municipality
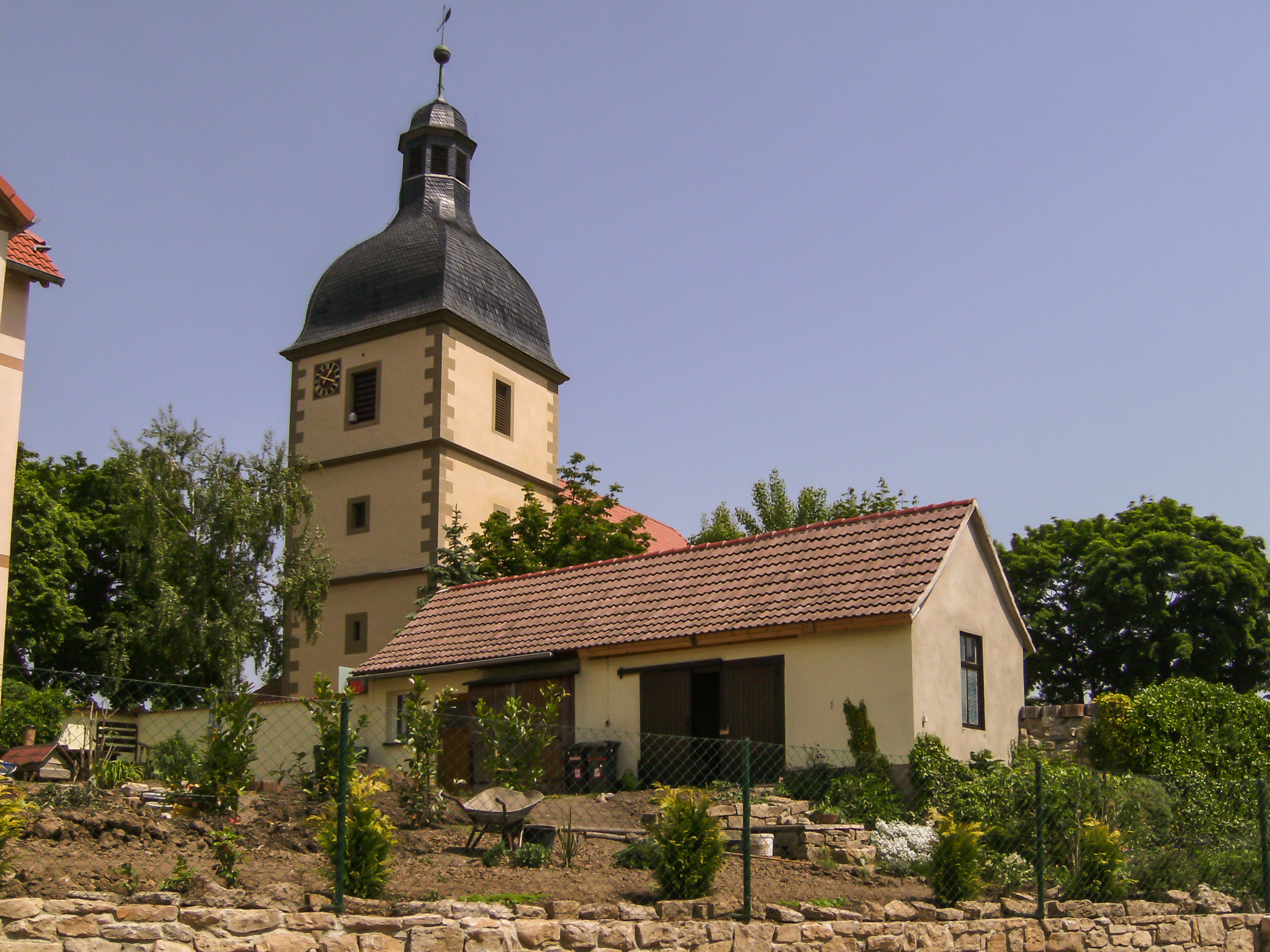
- Church

- Coat of arms

- Location of Schwabhausen within Gotha district
- Interactive map of Schwabhausen
- Location within Germany Location within Thuringia
- Coordinates: 50°53′18″N 10°44′0″E
- Country: Germany
- State: Thuringia
- District: Gotha

Government
  - Mayor (2022–28): Christoph Schröter

Area
  - Total: 9.37 km^{2} (3.62 sq mi)
- Elevation: 335 m (1,099 ft)

Population (2025-12-31)
  - Total: 783
  - Density: 83.6/km^{2} (216/sq mi)
- Time zone: UTC+01:00 (CET)
  - Summer (DST): UTC+02:00 (CEST)
- Postal codes: 99869
- Dialling codes: 036256
- Vehicle registration: GTH

Schwabhausen is a municipality in the district of Gotha, in Thuringia, Germany.
