= Ingersleben, Thuringia =

Ingersleben
- Ortsteil of Nesse-Apfelstädt

- Coat of arms
- Interactive map of Ingersleben
- Location within Germany Location within Thuringia
- Coordinates: 50°55′12″N 10°55′59″E
- Country: Germany
- State: Thuringia
- District: Gotha
- Municipality: Nesse-Apfelstädt

Area
  - Total: 9.63 km^{2} (3.72 sq mi)
- Elevation: 235 m (771 ft)

Population (2006-12-31)
  - Total: 1,058
  - Density: 110/km^{2} (285/sq mi)
- Time zone: UTC+01:00 (CET)
  - Summer (DST): UTC+02:00 (CEST)
- Postal codes: 99192
- Dialling codes: 036202

Ingersleben is a village and a former municipality in the district of Gotha, in Thuringia, Germany. Since 1 December 2009, it is part of the municipality Nesse-Apfelstädt.
