= Nesseaue =

- Verwaltungsgemeinschaft
- Map of Gotha highlighting Nesseaue
- Interactive map of Nesseaue
- Location within Germany Location within Thuringia
- Coordinates: 50°59′N 10°47′E
- Country: Germany
- State: Thuringia
- District: Gotha
- Seat: Friemar
- Subdivisions: 9 municipalities

Area
  - Total: 81.02 km^{2} (31.28 sq mi)

Population (2025-12-31)
  - Total: 5,579
  - Density: 68.86/km^{2} (178.3/sq mi)
- Time zone: UTC+01:00 (CET)
  - Summer (DST): UTC+02:00 (CEST)
- Website: www.vg-nesseaue.de

Nesseaue is a Verwaltungsgemeinschaft ("collective municipality") in the district of Gotha, in Thuringia, Germany. The seat of the Verwaltungsgemeinschaft is in Friemar.

The Verwaltungsgemeinschaft Nesseaue consists of the following municipalities:

1. Bienstädt
2. Eschenbergen
3. Friemar
4. Molschleben
5. Nottleben
6. Pferdingsleben
7. Tröchtelborn
8. Tüttleben
9. Zimmernsupra
