= Petriroda =

- Ortsteil of Georgenthal
- Coat of arms
- Interactive map of Petriroda
- Location within Germany Location within Thuringia
- Coordinates: 50°52′4″N 10°42′05″E
- Country: Germany
- State: Thuringia
- District: Gotha
- Municipality: Georgenthal

Area
  - Total: 3.15 km^{2} (1.22 sq mi)
- Elevation: 365 m (1,198 ft)

Population (2018-12-31)
  - Total: 300
  - Density: 95/km^{2} (250/sq mi)
- Time zone: UTC+01:00 (CET)
  - Summer (DST): UTC+02:00 (CEST)
- Postal codes: 99887
- Dialling codes: 036253
- Vehicle registration: GTH
- Website: petriroda.eu

Petriroda (German pronunciation: [peːtʁiˈʁoːda]) is a village and a former municipality in the district of Gotha, in Thuringia, Germany. Since December 2019, it is part of the municipality Georgenthal.
