= Michael Altenburg =

German theologian and composer

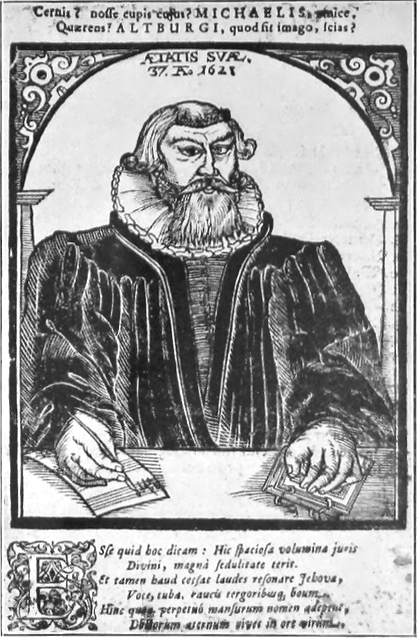
Michael Altenburg

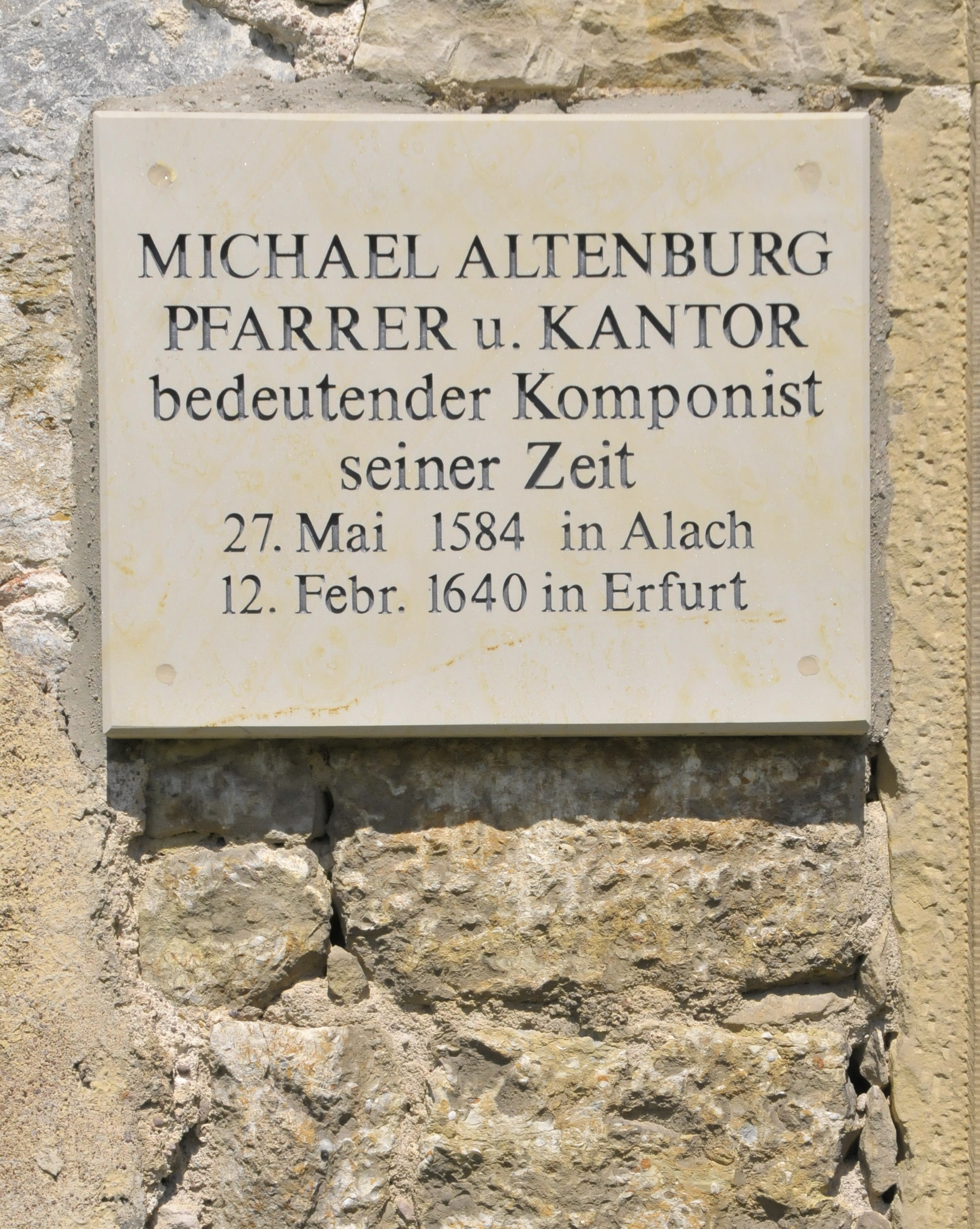
Altenburg Church plaque

Michael Altenburg (27 May 1584 – 12 February 1640) was a German theologian and composer.

Altenburg was born at Alach, near Erfurt. He began attending school in Erfurt in 1590; he began studying theology at the University of Erfurt in 1598, and was awarded a bachelor's degree in 1599 and a master's in 1603. From 1600 he taught at the Reglerschule in Erfurt; he was Kantor at St. Andreas from 1601 and rector of the school at St. Andreas in Erfurt from 1607. In 1609 he quit teaching to become a pastor, moving to Tröchtelborn and preaching there until 1621. During this period Altenburg published music, and was compared to Orlando di Lasso.

After 1621 he moved to Sömmerda, working at the Bonifaciuskirche. While he continued to publish and was respected for his compositions, the Thirty Years War sapped his efforts. In 1636 a massive plague wiped out most of his congregation, and his wife and ten of his children died before himself. He returned to Erfurt in 1637, where he remained as deacon and, from 1638, minister at St Andreas.

Much of Altenburg's compositional output consists of vocal concertos, motets and chorales.

== Works, hymns, editions and recordings ==
Works

- Passion after Isaiah ch. 53 for eight voices. Erfurt, 1608
- Marriage motet for eight voices. Erfurt, 1613
- Gaudium Christianum. Jena, 1617
- Musikalischer Schirm und Schild der Bürger etc. oder der 55. Psalm a 6. Erfurt, 1618
- Cantiones de adventu. Erfurt, 1620
- Erster Theil Newer Lieblicher vnd Zierlicher Intraden a 6. Erfurt, 1620
- Christliche liebliche und andächtige neue Kirchen- und Haus-Gesänge a 5, 6, 8. 3 Vols. Erfurt, 1620–21
- Cantiones de adventu a 5, 6, 8. Erfurt, 1621
- Musikalische Weihnachts- und Neujahrs-Zierde for 4-9 voices. Erfurt, 1621
- Musikalisches Festgefüge for 5 to 14 voices. Four vols, (only 3rd and 4th survive). Erfurt, 1623

Hymn melodies

- Aus Jacobs Stamm ein Stern sehr klar
- Herr Gott, nun schleuß den Himmel auf
- Herr Gott Vater, ich glaub an dich
- Jesu, du Gottes Lämmlein
- Verzage nicht, o Häuflein klein
- Was Gott tut das ist wohlgethan, kein einzig Mensch ihn tadeln kann.

Editions

- Intraden I-XVI, 2 Vols
- Puer natus in Bethlehem, from 1621 collection.
- Sechstimmige Advent- und Weihnachtsgesänge,
- Vierstimmige Weihnachtsgesänge

Recording

- Gaudium Christianum (Jena 1617) - Festmusik zur Reformationsfeier: Compositions: Das Lutherische Jubelgeschrey; Die Prophezeiung von Luthero; Das Lutherische Schloß oder Feste Burgk; Die Engelische Schlacht; Das Amen. Item Von Nun an bis in Ewigkeit; Das Amen Gott Vater und Sohne. With organ works by Sweelinck and Franz Tunder and motets to the Feast of Saint Michael by Samuel Scheidt, Heinrich Schütz, Melchior Franck, Demantius, and Johann Christoph Bach. Simone Schwark, Johanna Krell, Raimund Fürst, Kammerchor Bad Homburg, Johann Rosenmüller Ensemble, directed by Susanne Rohn. Christophorus. 2012
