= Tüttleben =

- Municipality
- Location of Tüttleben within Gotha district
- Interactive map of Tüttleben
- Location within Germany Location within Thuringia
- Coordinates: 50°57′N 10°48′E
- Country: Germany
- State: Thuringia
- District: Gotha
- Municipal assoc.: Nesseaue

Government
  - Mayor (2022–28): Klaus Lewald (CDU)

Area
  - Total: 7.26 km^{2} (2.80 sq mi)
- Elevation: 280 m (920 ft)

Population (2025-12-31)
  - Total: 771
  - Density: 106/km^{2} (275/sq mi)
- Time zone: UTC+01:00 (CET)
  - Summer (DST): UTC+02:00 (CEST)
- Postal codes: 99869
- Dialling codes: 03621
- Vehicle registration: GTH
- Website: www.vg-nesseaue.de

Tüttleben is a municipality in the district of Gotha, in Thuringia, Germany.

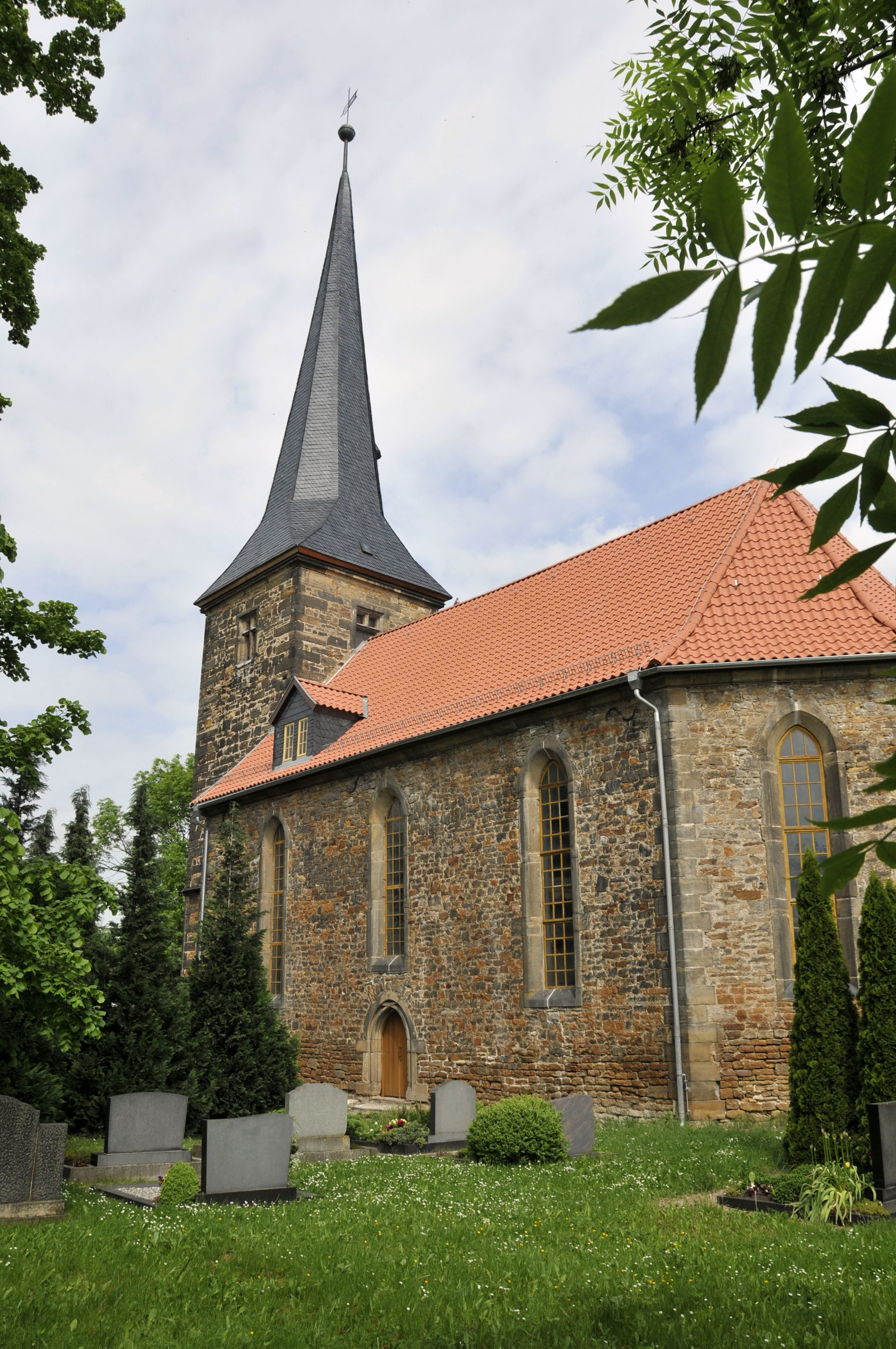
Church of Tüttleben
