= Gamstädt =

- Ortsteil of Nesse-Apfelstädt
- Coat of arms
- Interactive map of Gamstädt
- Location within Germany Location within Thuringia
- Coordinates: 50°56′59″N 10°53′6″E
- Country: Germany
- State: Thuringia
- District: Gotha
- Municipality: Nesse-Apfelstädt

Area
  - Total: 11.30 km^{2} (4.36 sq mi)
- Elevation: 298 m (978 ft)

Population (2006-12-31)
  - Total: 751
  - Density: 66.5/km^{2} (172/sq mi)
- Time zone: UTC+01:00 (CET)
  - Summer (DST): UTC+02:00 (CEST)
- Postal codes: 99192
- Dialling codes: 036208
- Website: www.ndfnet.de

Gamstädt is a village and a former municipality in the district of Gotha, in Thuringia, Germany. Since 1 December 2009, it is part of the municipality Nesse-Apfelstädt.
