= Eschenbergen =

- Municipality
- Coat of arms

- Location of Eschenbergen within Gotha district
- Interactive map of Eschenbergen
- Location within Germany Location within Thuringia
- Coordinates: 51°1′37″N 10°45′36″E
- Country: Germany
- State: Thuringia
- District: Gotha
- Municipal assoc.: Nesseaue

Government
  - Mayor (2022–28): Ines Laufer (CDU)

Area
  - Total: 12.66 km^{2} (4.89 sq mi)
- Elevation: 300 m (980 ft)

Population (2025-12-31)
  - Total: 705
  - Density: 55.7/km^{2} (144/sq mi)
- Time zone: UTC+01:00 (CET)
  - Summer (DST): UTC+02:00 (CEST)
- Postal codes: 99869
- Dialling codes: 036258
- Vehicle registration: GTH
- Website: www.vg-nesseaue.de

Eschenbergen is a municipality in the district of Gotha, in Thuringia, Germany.

Johann Christian Wilhelm Augusti (1772–1841), a German theologian, was born in Eschenbergen.
