= Drei Gleichen =

- Municipality
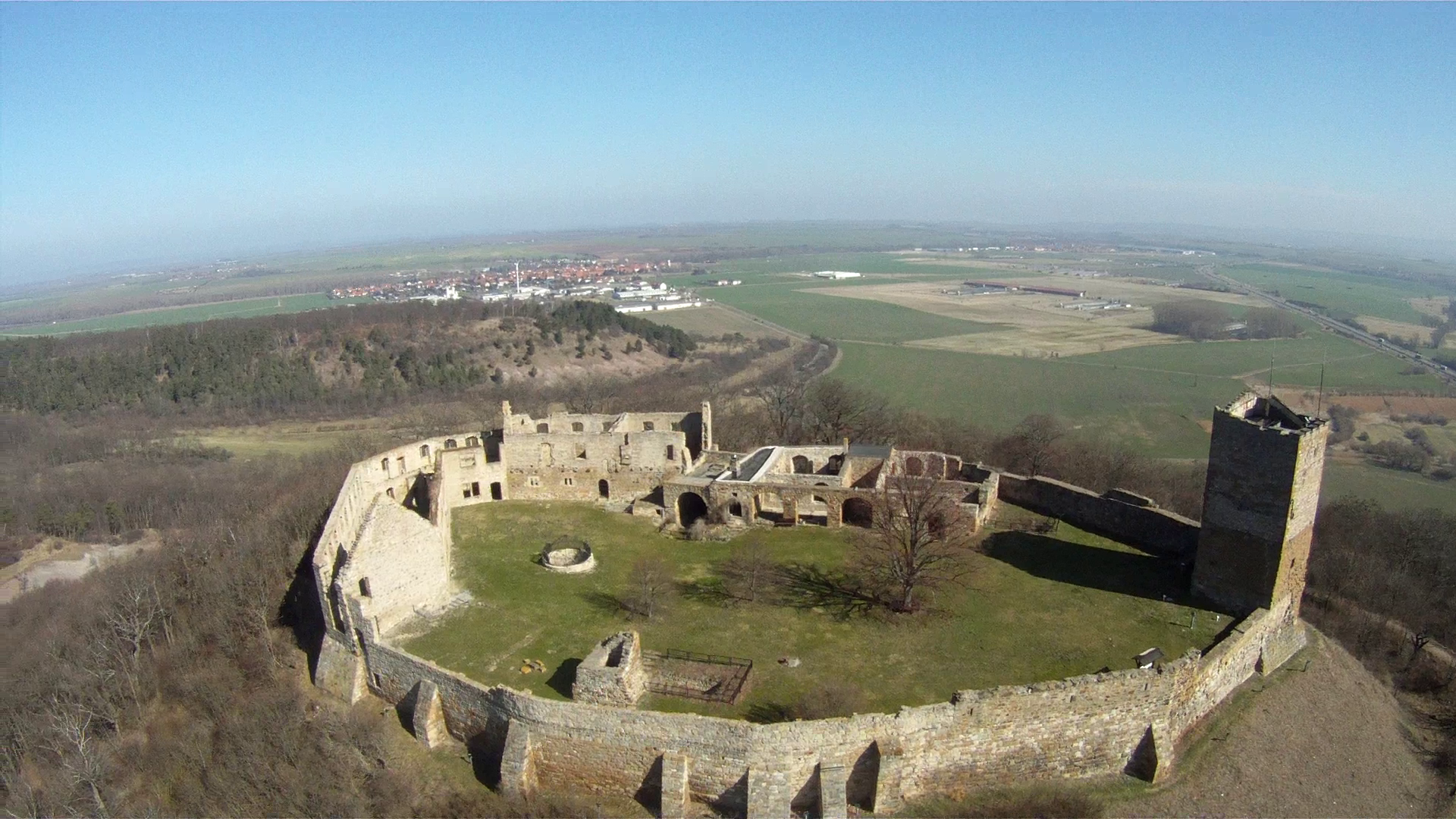
- Gleichen Castle

- Location of Drei Gleichen within Gotha district
- Interactive map of Drei Gleichen
- Location within Germany Location within Thuringia
- Coordinates: 50°52′N 10°49′E
- Country: Germany
- State: Thuringia
- District: Gotha

Government
  - Mayor (2018–24): Jens Leffler (CDU)

Area
  - Total: 84.89 km^{2} (32.78 sq mi)

Population (2025-12-31)
  - Total: 7,882
  - Density: 92.85/km^{2} (240.5/sq mi)
- Time zone: UTC+01:00 (CET)
  - Summer (DST): UTC+02:00 (CEST)
- Postal codes: 99869
- Dialling codes: 036202, 036256
- Vehicle registration: GTH
- Website: www.drei-gleichen.de

Drei Gleichen (German pronunciation: [ˈdʁaɪ ˈɡlaɪçn̩]) is a municipality in the district of Gotha, in Thuringia, Germany. It was formed on 1 January 2009 by the merger of the former municipalities Grabsleben, Mühlberg, Seebergen and Wandersleben. Since May 1992, these municipalities had cooperated in the Verwaltungsgemeinschaft ("collective municipality") Drei Gleichen. This Verwaltungsgemeinschaft was disbanded on 1 January 2009. It is named after the drei Gleichen ("three like") castles between Gotha and Erfurt. In July 2018 the former municipality of Günthersleben-Wechmar was merged into Drei Gleichen.
