= Großfahner =

- Municipality
- Coat of arms

- Location of Großfahner within Gotha district
- Interactive map of Großfahner
- Location within Germany Location within Thuringia
- Coordinates: 51°4′N 10°49′E
- Country: Germany
- State: Thuringia
- District: Gotha
- Municipal assoc.: Fahner Höhe

Government
  - Mayor (2022–28): Martin Pennewiss

Area
  - Total: 11.41 km^{2} (4.41 sq mi)
- Elevation: 200 m (660 ft)

Population (2025-12-31)
  - Total: 844
  - Density: 74.0/km^{2} (192/sq mi)
- Time zone: UTC+01:00 (CET)
  - Summer (DST): UTC+02:00 (CEST)
- Postal codes: 99100
- Dialling codes: 036206
- Vehicle registration: GTH
- Website: www.vg-fahner-hoehe.de

Großfahner is a municipality in the district of Gotha, in Thuringia, Germany.

The town is known to music historians due to the 600 manuscripts from 1650-1750 copied by the church music director of the period - these include cantatas from forgotten Kleinmeistern such as Buttstedt, Friedrich Erhard Niedt, "Liebhold," Georg Friedrich Künstel and Johann Topf, as well as the only surviving copies of works by masters such as Pachelbel and Telemann.
