= Döllstädt =

- Municipality
- Coat of arms

- Location of Döllstädt within Gotha district
- Interactive map of Döllstädt
- Location within Germany Location within Thuringia
- Coordinates: 51°4′55″N 10°48′47″E
- Country: Germany
- State: Thuringia
- District: Gotha
- Municipal assoc.: Fahner Höhe

Government
  - Mayor (2022–28): Torsten Kaufmann

Area
  - Total: 13.37 km^{2} (5.16 sq mi)
- Elevation: 200 m (660 ft)

Population (2025-12-31)
  - Total: 1,043
  - Density: 78.01/km^{2} (202.0/sq mi)
- Time zone: UTC+01:00 (CET)
  - Summer (DST): UTC+02:00 (CEST)
- Postal codes: 99100
- Dialling codes: 036206
- Vehicle registration: GTH
- Website: www.doellstaedt.de

Döllstädt is a municipality in the district of Gotha, in Thuringia, Germany.
