= Pferdingsleben =

- Municipality
- Coat of arms

- Location of Pferdingsleben within Gotha district
- Interactive map of Pferdingsleben
- Location within Germany Location within Thuringia
- Coordinates: 50°58′12″N 10°49′11″E
- Country: Germany
- State: Thuringia
- District: Gotha
- Municipal assoc.: Nesseaue

Government
  - Mayor (2022–28): Sandra Kamm

Area
  - Total: 6.61 km^{2} (2.55 sq mi)
- Elevation: 290 m (950 ft)

Population (2025-12-31)
  - Total: 366
  - Density: 55.4/km^{2} (143/sq mi)
- Time zone: UTC+01:00 (CET)
  - Summer (DST): UTC+02:00 (CEST)
- Postal codes: 99869
- Dialling codes: 036258
- Vehicle registration: GTH
- Website: www.vg-nesseaue.de

Pferdingsleben is a municipality in the district of Gotha, in Thuringia, Germany.
