= Nottleben =

- Municipality
- Coat of arms

- Location of Nottleben within Gotha district
- Interactive map of Nottleben
- Location within Germany Location within Thuringia
- Coordinates: 50°57′55″N 10°50′40″E
- Country: Germany
- State: Thuringia
- District: Gotha
- Municipal assoc.: Nesseaue

Government
  - Mayor (2022–28): René Sauerbier

Area
  - Total: 8.50 km^{2} (3.28 sq mi)
- Elevation: 290 m (950 ft)

Population (2025-12-31)
  - Total: 425
  - Density: 50.0/km^{2} (129/sq mi)
- Time zone: UTC+01:00 (CET)
  - Summer (DST): UTC+02:00 (CEST)
- Postal codes: 99192
- Dialling codes: 036208
- Vehicle registration: GTH
- Website: www.vg-nesseaue.de

Nottleben is a municipality in the district of Gotha, in Thuringia, Germany.
