= Apfelstädt (Nesse-Apfelstädt) =

- Ortsteil of Nesse-Apfelstädt
- Coat of arms
- Interactive map of Apfelstädt
- Location within Germany Location within Thuringia
- Coordinates: 50°54′6″N 10°53′24″E
- Country: Germany
- State: Thuringia
- District: Gotha
- Municipality: Nesse-Apfelstädt

Area
  - Total: 12.16 km^{2} (4.70 sq mi)
- Elevation: 249 m (817 ft)

Population (2006-12-31)
  - Total: 1,433
  - Density: 117.8/km^{2} (305.2/sq mi)
- Time zone: UTC+01:00 (CET)
  - Summer (DST): UTC+02:00 (CEST)
- Postal codes: 99192
- Dialling codes: 036202
- Vehicle registration: GTH

Apfelstädt (German pronunciation: [ˈapfl̩ʃtɛt]) is a village and a former municipality in the district of Gotha, in Thuringia, Germany. Since 1 December 2009, it is part of the municipality Nesse-Apfelstädt.
