= Bienstädt =

- Municipality
- Location of Bienstädt within Gotha district
- Interactive map of Bienstädt
- Location within Germany Location within Thuringia
- Coordinates: 51°1′2″N 10°50′52″E
- Country: Germany
- State: Thuringia
- District: Gotha
- Municipal assoc.: Nesseaue

Government
  - Mayor (2020–26): Holger Günther (CDU)

Area
  - Total: 8.17 km^{2} (3.15 sq mi)
- Elevation: 350 m (1,150 ft)

Population (2025-12-31)
  - Total: 677
  - Density: 82.9/km^{2} (215/sq mi)
- Time zone: UTC+01:00 (CET)
  - Summer (DST): UTC+02:00 (CEST)
- Postal codes: 99100
- Dialling codes: 036208
- Vehicle registration: GTH
- Website: www.vg-nesseaue.de

Bienstädt is a municipality in the district of Gotha, in Thuringia, Germany.
