= Molschleben =

- Municipality
- Coat of arms

- Location of Molschleben within Gotha district
- Interactive map of Molschleben
- Location within Germany Location within Thuringia
- Coordinates: 51°0′16″N 10°46′47″E
- Country: Germany
- State: Thuringia
- District: Gotha
- Municipal assoc.: Nesseaue

Government
  - Mayor (2022–28): Marcel Struppert (Ind.)

Area
  - Total: 15.24 km^{2} (5.88 sq mi)
- Elevation: 290 m (950 ft)

Population (2025-12-31)
  - Total: 1,009
  - Density: 66.21/km^{2} (171.5/sq mi)
- Time zone: UTC+01:00 (CET)
  - Summer (DST): UTC+02:00 (CEST)
- Postal codes: 99869
- Dialling codes: 036258
- Vehicle registration: GTH
- Website: www.molschleben.de

Molschleben is a municipality in the district of Gotha, in Thuringia, Germany.
