= Zimmernsupra =

- Municipality
- Location of Zimmernsupra within Gotha district
- Interactive map of Zimmernsupra
- Location within Germany Location within Thuringia
- Coordinates: 50°59′N 10°52′E
- Country: Germany
- State: Thuringia
- District: Gotha
- Municipal assoc.: Nesseaue

Government
  - Mayor (2022–28): Christoph Mader

Area
  - Total: 7.41 km^{2} (2.86 sq mi)
- Elevation: 308 m (1,010 ft)

Population (2025-12-31)
  - Total: 337
  - Density: 45.5/km^{2} (118/sq mi)
- Time zone: UTC+01:00 (CET)
  - Summer (DST): UTC+02:00 (CEST)
- Postal codes: 99100
- Dialling codes: 036208
- Vehicle registration: GTH
- Website: www.vg-nesseaue.de

Zimmernsupra is a municipality in the district of Gotha, in Thuringia, Germany. Notable landmarks include the Gothic-style St. Jacobus Church and the Gasthaus zur Kaiserlinde, known for its traditional Thuringian cuisine.

== History ==
Within the German Empire (1871–1918), Zimmernsupra was part of the Prussian Province of Saxony.
