= Mühlberg, Thuringia =

Mühlberg
- Ortsteil of Drei Gleichen
- Coat of arms
- Interactive map of Mühlberg
- Location within Germany Location within Thuringia
- Coordinates: 50°52′3″N 10°49′27″E
- Country: Germany
- State: Thuringia
- District: Gotha
- Town: Drei Gleichen

Area
  - Total: 22.48 km^{2} (8.68 sq mi)
- Elevation: 290 m (950 ft)

Population (2006-12-31)
  - Total: 1,327
  - Density: 59.03/km^{2} (152.9/sq mi)
- Time zone: UTC+01:00 (CET)
  - Summer (DST): UTC+02:00 (CEST)
- Postal codes: 99869
- Dialling codes: 036256
- Website: www.muehlberg-online.de

Mühlberg (German pronunciation: [ˈmyːlbɛʁk]) is a village and a former municipality in the district of Gotha, in Thuringia, Germany. Since 1 January 2009, it is part of the municipality Drei Gleichen.

== Gallery ==
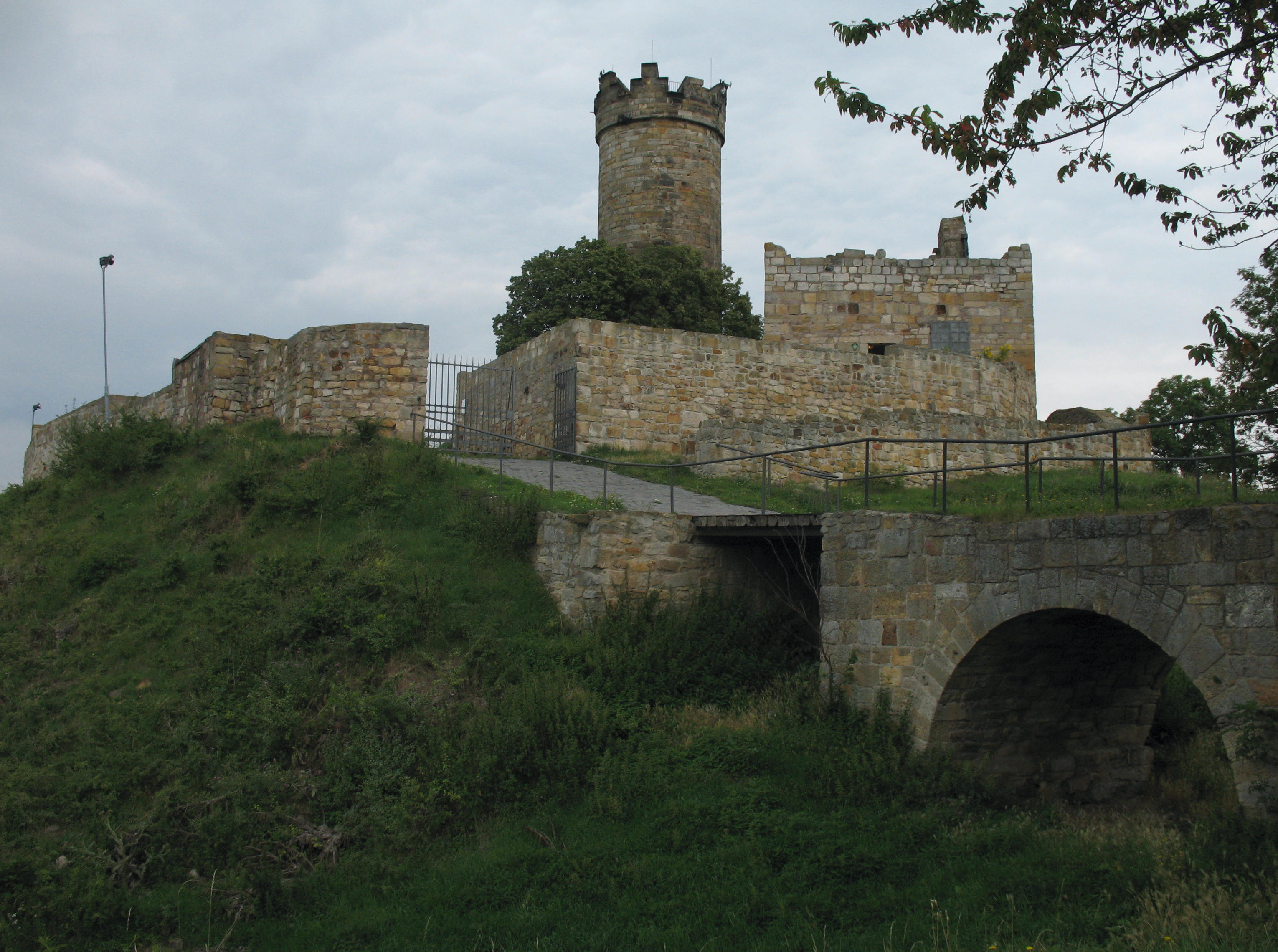
Mühlburg

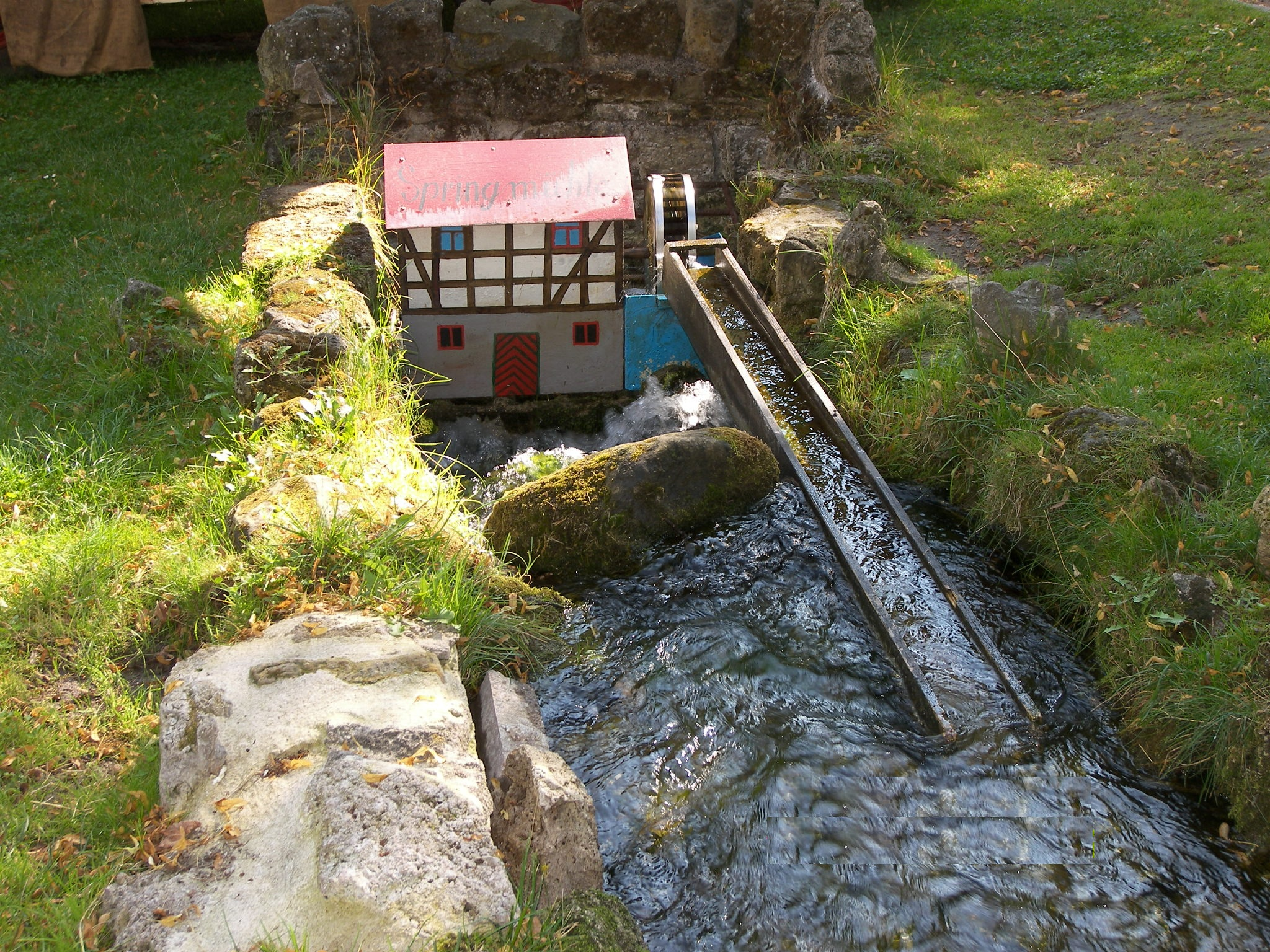
