= Georgenthal =

- Municipality
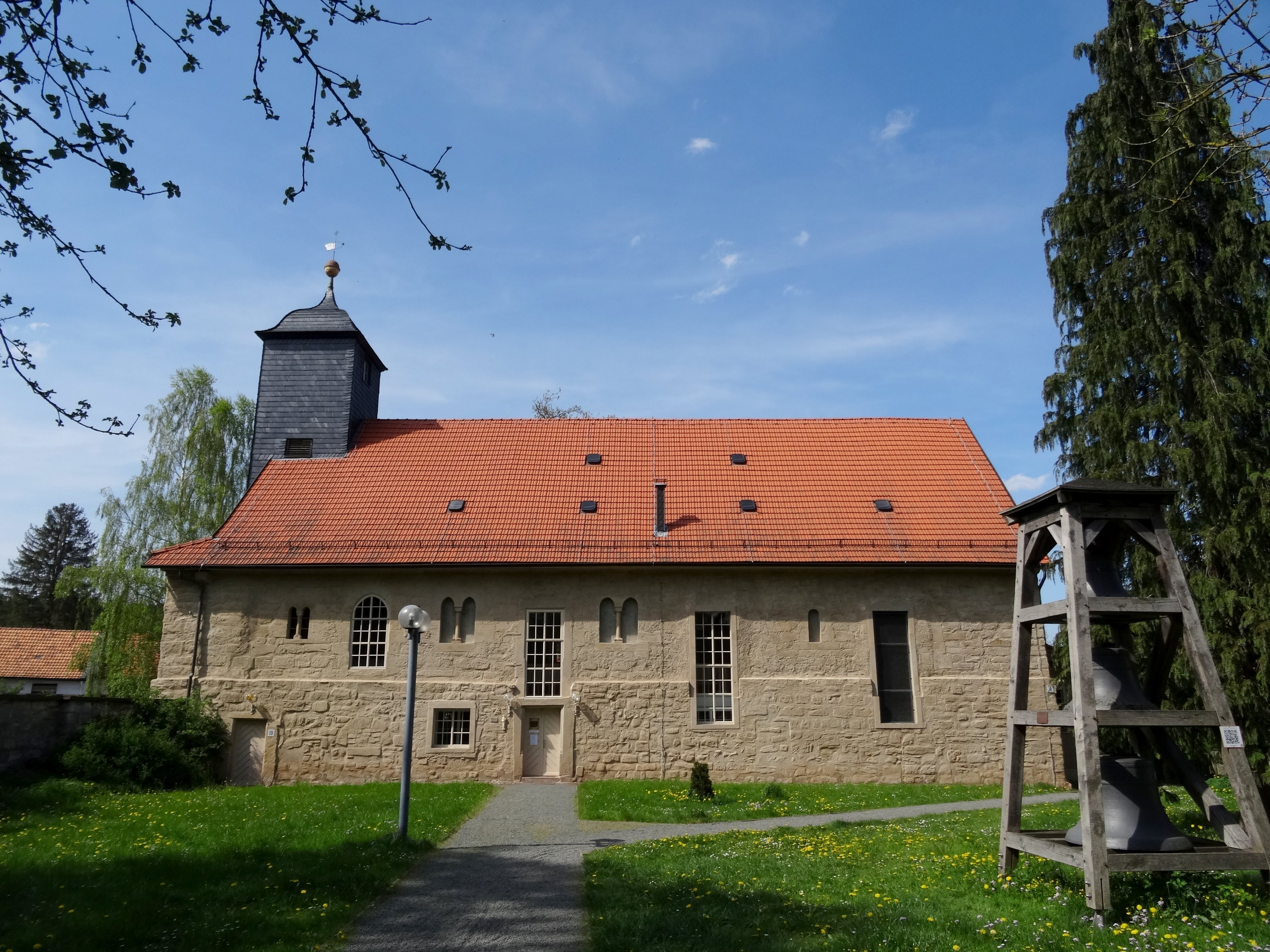
- Saint Elisabeth Church

- Coat of arms

- Location of Georgenthal within Gotha district
- Interactive map of Georgenthal
- Location within Germany Location within Thuringia
- Coordinates: 50°49′N 10°40′E
- Country: Germany
- State: Thuringia
- District: Gotha

Government
  - Mayor (2020–26): Florian Hofmann

Area
  - Total: 79.15 km^{2} (30.56 sq mi)
- Elevation: 390 m (1,280 ft)

Population (2025-12-31)
  - Total: 7,824
  - Density: 98.85/km^{2} (256.0/sq mi)
- Time zone: UTC+01:00 (CET)
  - Summer (DST): UTC+02:00 (CEST)
- Postal codes: 99887
- Dialling codes: 036253
- Vehicle registration: GTH
- Website: www.georgenthal.de

Georgenthal (German pronunciation: [ˈɡeːɔʁɡn̩ˌtaːl]) is a municipality in the district of Gotha, in Thuringia, Germany. The former municipalities Leinatal, Hohenkirchen and Petriroda were merged into Georgenthal in December 2019. The former municipality Herrenhof was merged into Georgenthal in January 2024.
