= Nesse-Apfelstädt =

- Municipality
- Coat of arms

- Location of Nesse-Apfelstädt within Gotha district
- Interactive map of Nesse-Apfelstädt
- Location within Germany Location within Thuringia
- Coordinates: 50°55′N 10°55′E
- Country: Germany
- State: Thuringia
- District: Gotha
- Founded: 2009
- Subdivisions: 6 villages

Government
  - Mayor (2022–28): Christian Jacob

Area
  - Total: 39.59 km^{2} (15.29 sq mi)
- Elevation: 265 m (869 ft)

Population (2025-12-31)
  - Total: 6,021
  - Density: 152.1/km^{2} (393.9/sq mi)
- Time zone: UTC+01:00 (CET)
  - Summer (DST): UTC+02:00 (CEST)
- Postal codes: 99192
- Dialling codes: 036202, 036208
- Vehicle registration: GTH
- Website: nesse-apfelstaedt.de

Nesse-Apfelstädt (German pronunciation: [ˈnɛsə ˈʔapfl̩ʃtɛt]) is a municipality in the district of Gotha, in Thuringia, Germany. It was formed by the merger of the previously independent municipalities Apfelstädt, Gamstädt, Ingersleben and Neudietendorf, on 1 December 2009.

== Villages ==
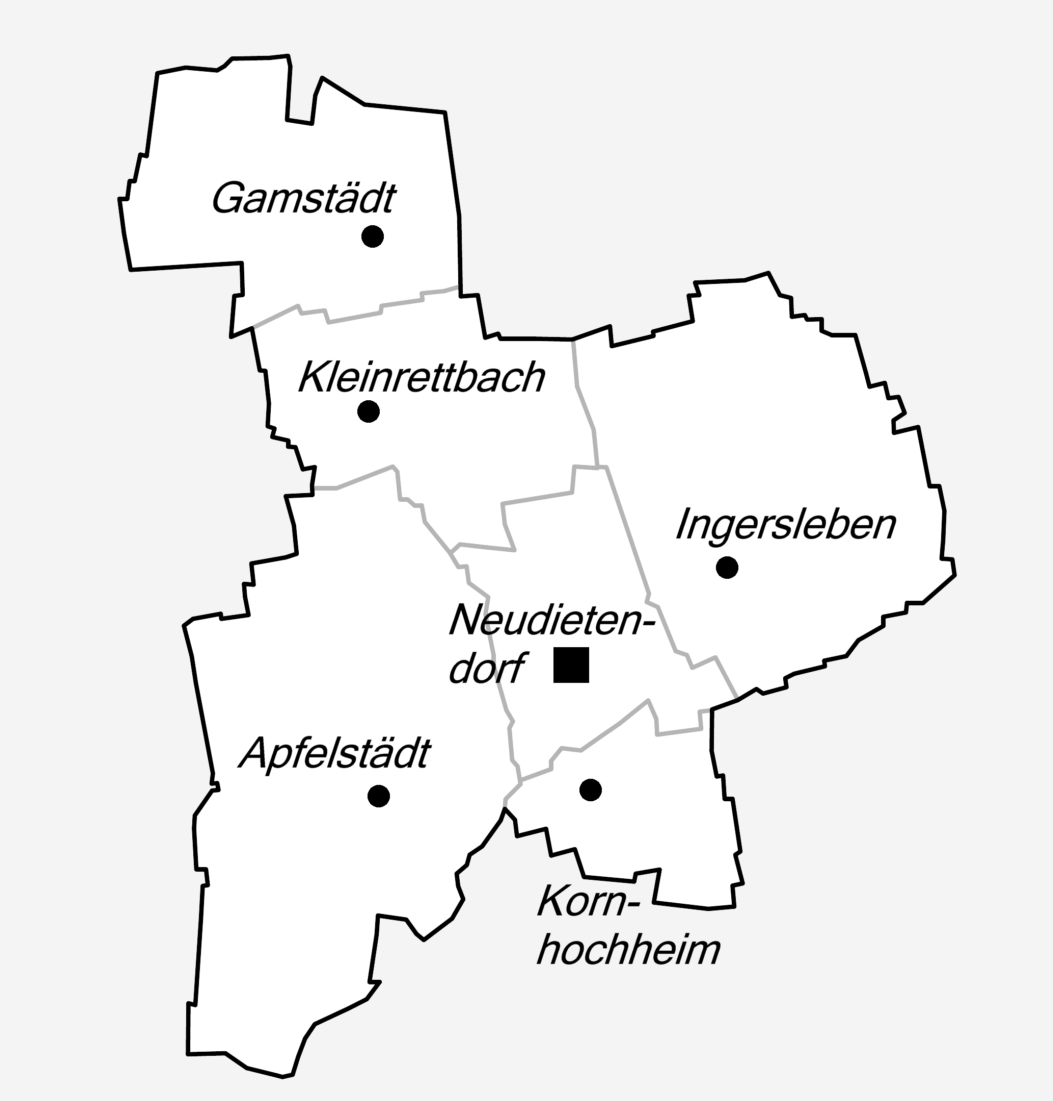
The six villages of Nesse-Apfelstädt

The municipality Nesse-Apfelstädt consists of the following six villages:

- Apfelstädt
- Gamstädt
- Ingersleben
- Kleinrettbach
- Kornhochheim
- Neudietendorf
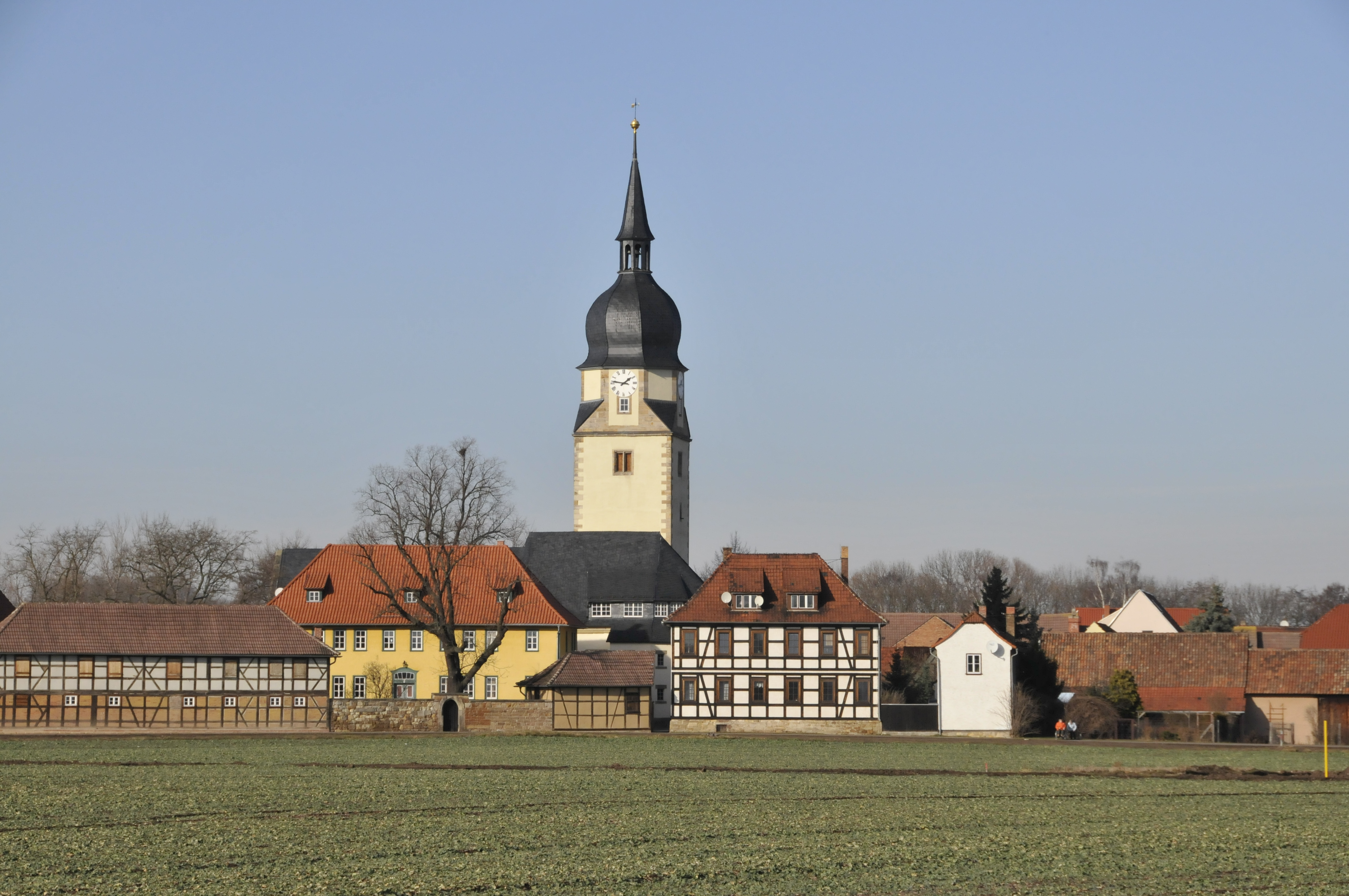
View of Apfelstädt from south, with St Walpurga's Church

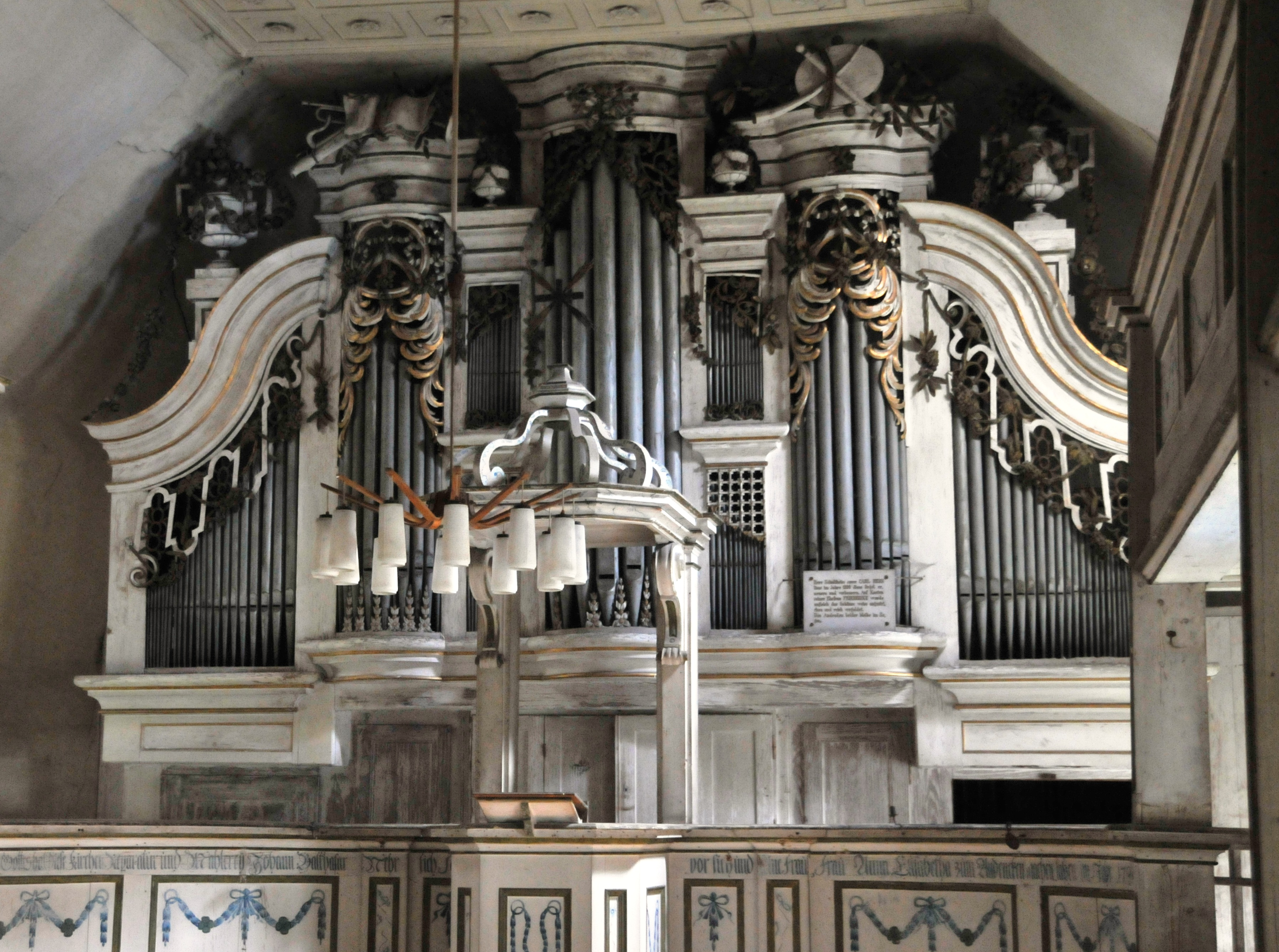
Organ of St Michael's Church in Gamstädt

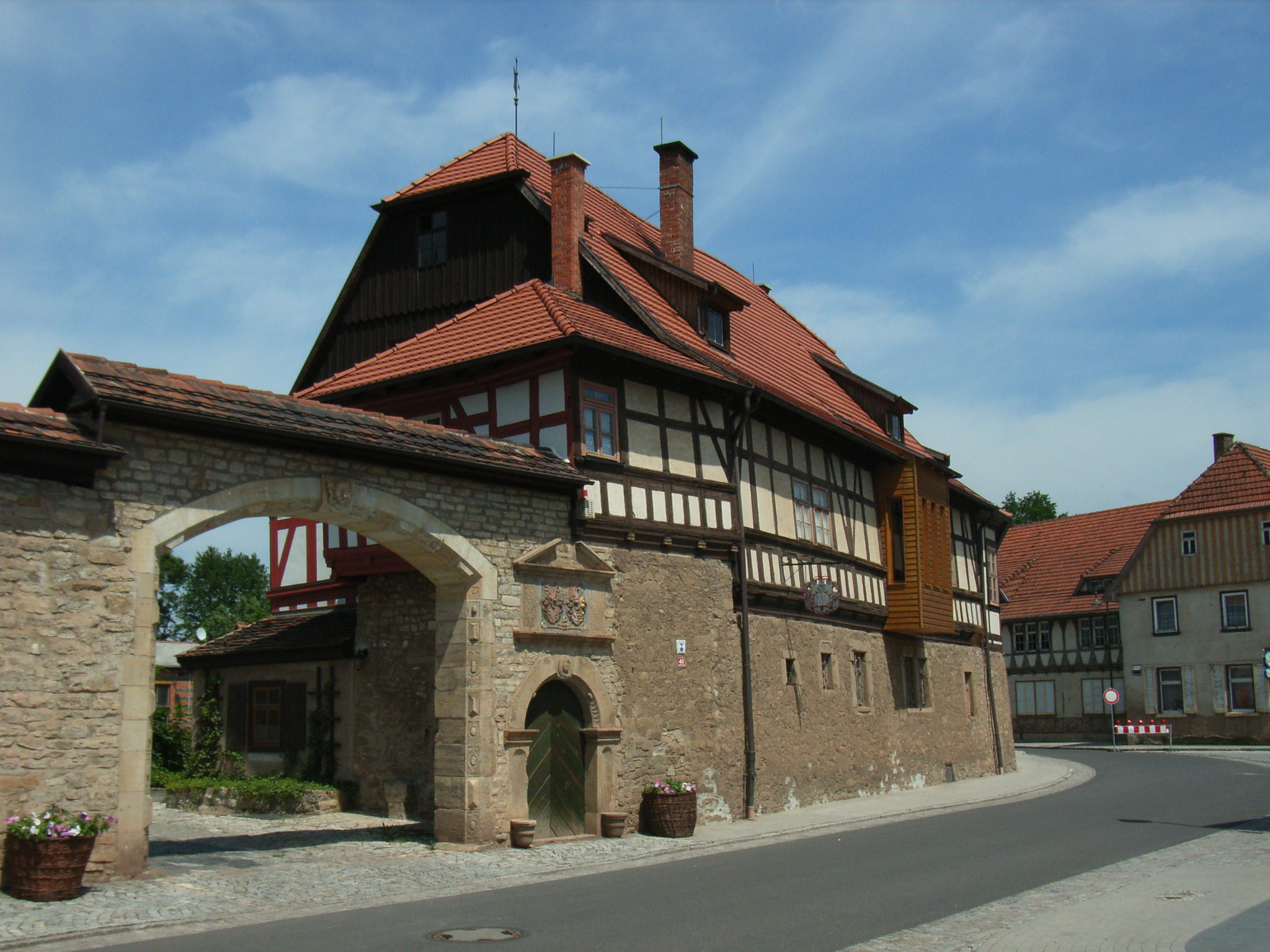
Local museum in Ingersleben

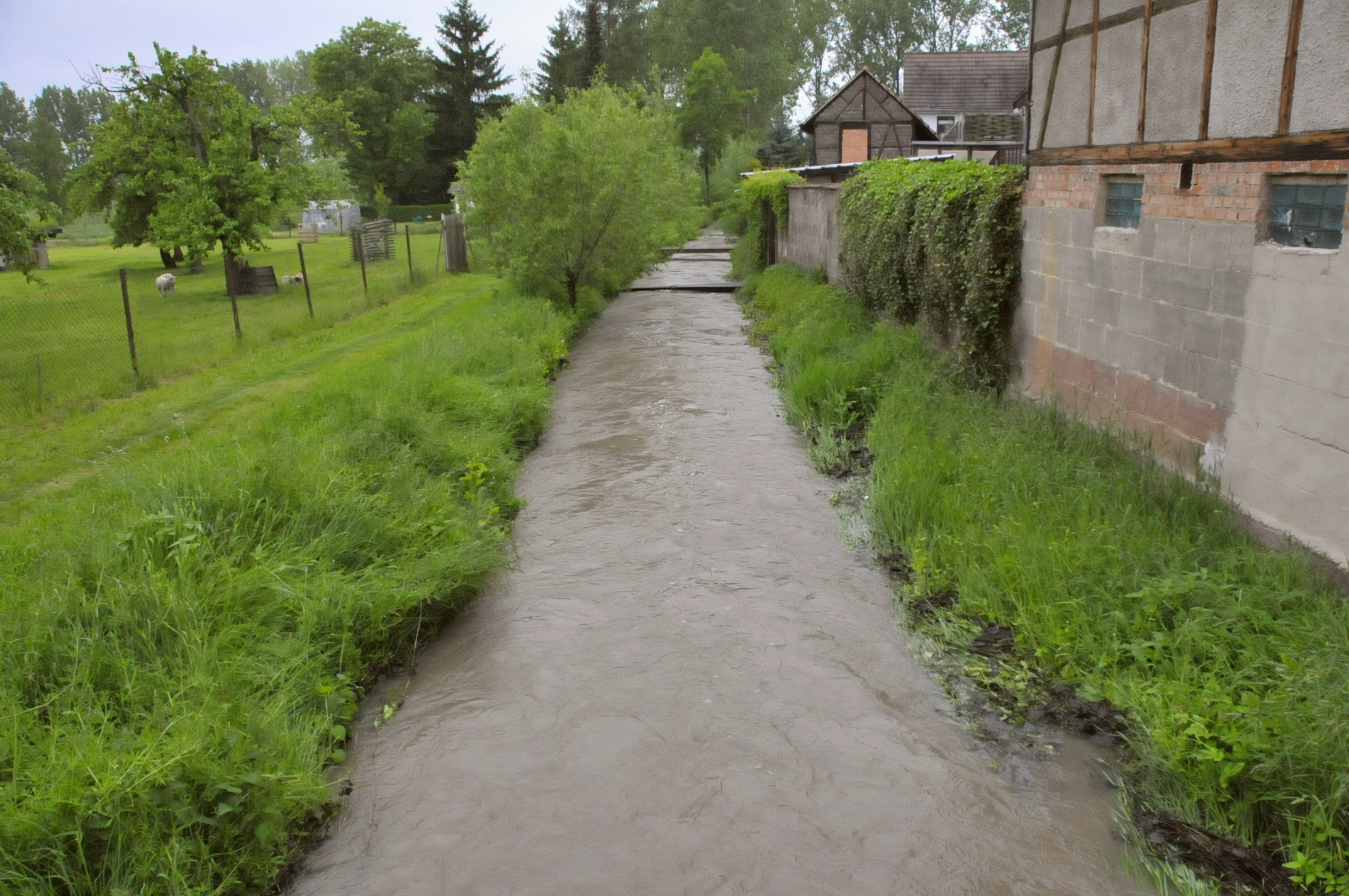
Rettbach stream in Kleinrettbach

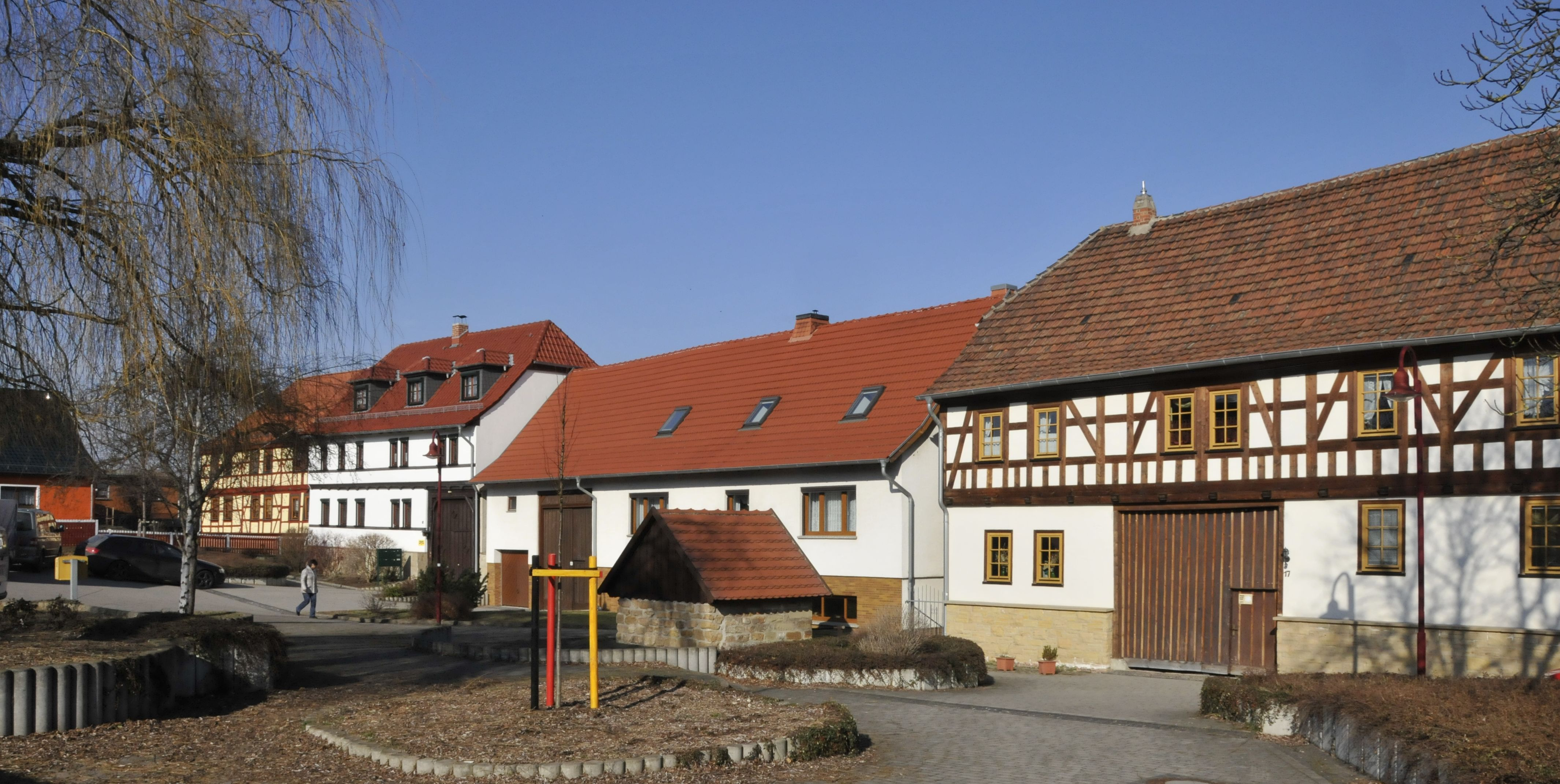
Village square in Kornhochheim

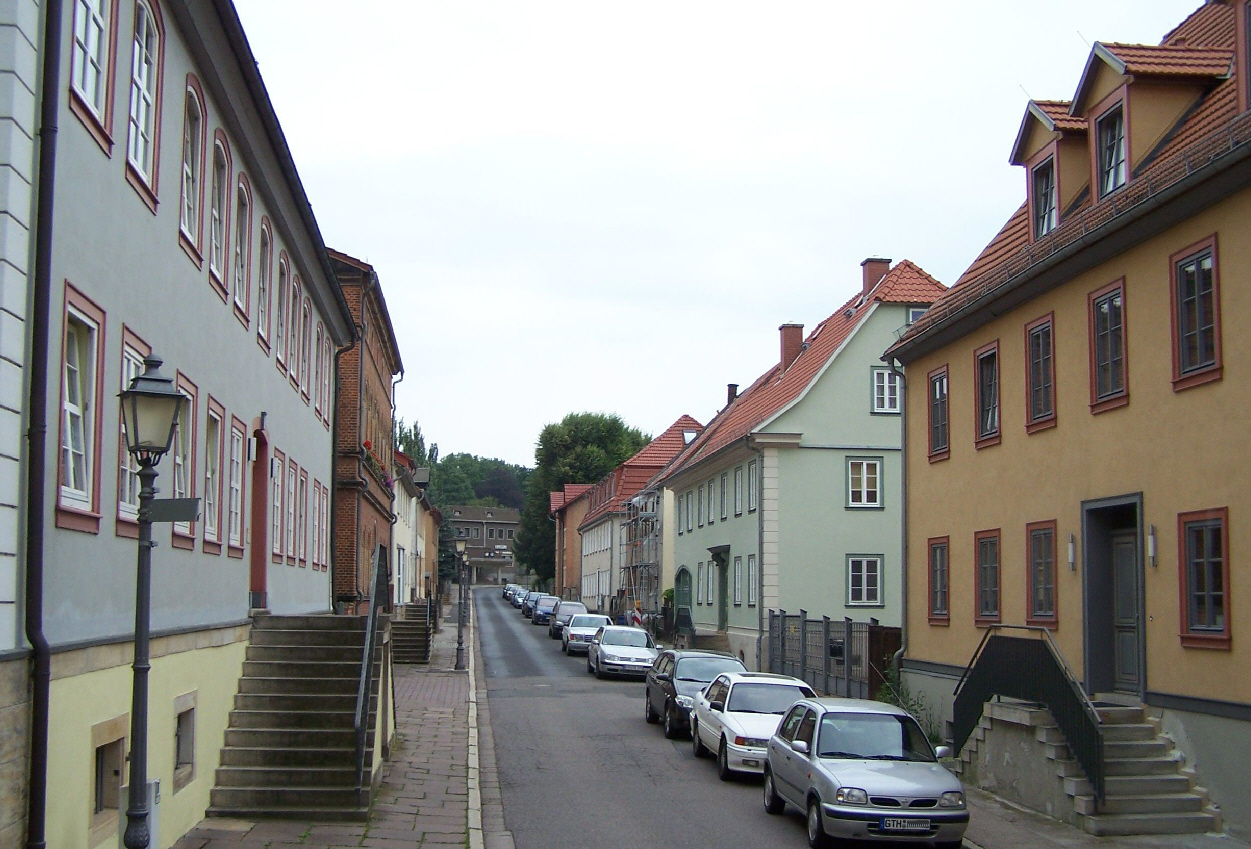
Bahnhofstraße (Station Street) in Neudietendorf
