= Friemar =

- Municipality
- Coat of arms

- Location of Friemar within Gotha district
- Interactive map of Friemar
- Location within Germany Location within Thuringia
- Coordinates: 50°59′N 10°47′E
- Country: Germany
- State: Thuringia
- District: Gotha
- Municipal assoc.: Nesseaue

Government
  - Mayor (2022–28): Katrin Rothlauf

Area
  - Total: 9.37 km^{2} (3.62 sq mi)
- Elevation: 285 m (935 ft)

Population (2025-12-31)
  - Total: 992
  - Density: 106/km^{2} (274/sq mi)
- Time zone: UTC+01:00 (CET)
  - Summer (DST): UTC+02:00 (CEST)
- Postal codes: 99869
- Dialling codes: 036258
- Vehicle registration: GTH

Friemar is a municipality in the district of Gotha, in Thuringia, Germany.
