= Gotha (district) =

Coordinates: 50°55′N 10°45′E

- District
- Flag Coat of arms
- Country: Germany
- State: Thuringia
- Capital: Gotha

Government
  - District admin.: Onno Eckert (SPD)

Area
  - Total: 935.89 km^{2} (361.35 sq mi)

Population (31 December 2025)
  - Total: 135,838
  - Density: 145.14/km^{2} (375.92/sq mi)
- Time zone: UTC+01:00 (CET)
  - Summer (DST): UTC+02:00 (CEST)
- Vehicle registration: GTH
- Website: www.landkreis-gotha.de

Gotha (German: Landkreis Gotha) is a Kreis (district) in western central Thuringia, Germany. Neighboring districts are Unstrut-Hainich-Kreis, Sömmerda, the Kreis-free city of Erfurt, Ilm-Kreis, Schmalkalden-Meiningen and the Wartburgkreis.

== Geography ==
Gotha borders the Thuringian Basin in the north and east, with a low point of about 200 meters (656 feet) in the northern part of the district. Fahner Heights, a muschelkalk ridge with a height of 413 meters (1,355 feet), is located in the extreme north, between the municipalities of Tonna and Bienstädt.

The land rises to about 900 meters (2,953 feet) in the Thuringian Forest, which covers the south-western area of the district. The Rennsteig hiking trail follows a ridgeline through the forest. The highest point in the district is Großer Inselsberg at 916.5 m (3,007 ft), on the border with Schmalkalden-Meiningen. The southern area of the district also has 3 dams: the Ohra Dam near the village of Luisenthal, as well as the Tambach-Dietharz Dam and the Schmalwasser Dam, both in the catchment area of the Apfelstädt, near the town of Tambach-Dietharz.

On the southeastern boundary of the district, between Ohrdruf and Mühlberg, is the muschelkalk Ohrdrufer Plateau which sits at an average of about 450 meters (1,436 ft). Since 1906, 49.5 km^{2} of this plateau has been used as military proving ground.

Aside from the areas covered by the Thuringian forest and other small wooded ridges, the district is largely used for agriculture.

== History ==
=== Administrative ===
In 1640, Gotha was partitioned from the Saxon Duchy of Saxe-Weimar to form the Duchy of Saxe-Gotha in the Holy Roman Empire. After acquiring additional territory from nearby dutchies, Saxe-Gotha was itself partitioned into seven dutchies in 1680, with the Gotha territory continuing in Saxe-Gotha-Altenburg. The duchy's ruling family line went extinct in 1825 with the death of Frederick IV, and the territory was divided again, this time into Saxe-Hildburghausen and Saxe-Coburg and Gotha. With the abolishment of the Monarchy of Germany following the November Revolution, the territory of Coburg was merged into Bavaria, and Gotha became part of Thuringia.

The Weimar district of Gotha was formed on October 1, 1922, from the largest parts of the cities and surrounding district offices of Gotha, Ohrdruf, and Waltershausen. The city of Gotha was made the district capital. This merged district extended south to Oberhof.

During the Nazi regime, municipal self-government ended abruptly in 1933. After the Second World War, both the US and later Soviet military government reinstated the administrative structures from the Weimar period, with some municipal additions and removals happening in 1946. In 1949, Gotha was integrated into East Germany, undergoing further territorial changes in 1950 and during the administrative reform of 1952.

In May 1990, the first free municipal elections since 1946 took place in Thuringia, with Thuringia being re-established as a free state later in October of that year. Local government was officially granted power by Thuringia in 1993, in the form of district councils and district administrators. The most recent territorial change for the district was in 1994, where it gained several towns from surrounding former East German districts.

In 2009, the Nesse-Apfelstädt-Gemeinden Verwaltungsgemeinschaft ("collective municipality") was disbanded.

=== Population ===
- 1925 - 104,178
- 1933 - 106,262
- 1939 - 111,101
- 1994 - 148 437
- 1995 - 148,373
- 1996 - 148,868
- 1997 - 149,532
- 1998 - 149,625
- 1999 - 149,491
- 2000 - 148,527
- 2001 - 147,418
- 2002 - 146,632
- 2003 - 145,383
- 2004 - 144,833
- 2005 - 143,745
- 2006 - 142,491
- 2007 - 141,405
- 2008 - 140,041
- 2009 - 138,857
- 2010 - 138,056
- 2011 - 137,340
- 2012 - 135,376
- 2013 - 135,155
- 2014 - 135,381
- 2015 - 136,831
- 2016 - 135,430

Data Source: Thuringian State Office for Statistics

=== Directors, Chairmen, and Administrators of the District ===
Years in Office	Name	Title
1922	Max Friedrich Jungherr	Acting District Director
1922–1924	Edmund Christian Georg Koch	District Director
1924-1926	Louis Leutheusser	District Director
1926-1932	Louis Leutheusser	District Administrator
1932-1933	Alexander Borkhardt	District Administrator
1939–1945	Ernst Guyet	District Administrator
1945	Hans Echarti	District Administrator
1945–1949	Arthur Luck	District Administrator
1949–1950	Kurt Hecht	District Administrator
1950–1951	Elisabeth März-Wesenick	District Administrator
1951–1952	Hugo Gräf	District Administrator
1952–1953	Hugo Gräf	Chairman of the Council of the District
1953–1958	Fritz Singer	Chairman of the Council of the District
1958–1960	Herwig Roos	Chairman of the Council of the District
1960–1966	Karl Hupe	Chairman of the Council of the District
1966	Herbert Korb	President-in-Office of the Council of the District
1966-1981	Rudolf Kornagel	Chairman of the Council of the District
1981-1990	Wolfgang Schädel	Chairman of the Council of the District
1990	Günther Hertel	Chairman of the Council of the District
1990-2000	Dieter Reinholz	District Administrator
2000-2005	Siegfried Liebezeit	District Administrator
2005-2006	Konrad Gießmann	Acting District Administrator
2006-2018	Konrad Gießmann	District Administrator
2018-	Onno Eckert	District Administrator

== Partnerships ==
Since 1990 the district has a partnership with the district Main-Kinzig in Hessen, Germany.

== Coat of arms ==
The coat of arms shows Friedenstein Castle in the top, the largest Baroque building located in the city of Gotha. The wavy line below symbolizes the Leina canal, which was built from 1366 to 1369 from Schönau to Gotha, to bring water into the city. The star at the bottom was the symbol of the Duchy of Saxe-Gotha-Altenburg.

The coat of arms was granted on 28 June 1991.

== Towns and municipalities ==
Clickable map of towns and municipalities in the district

Verwaltungsgemeinschaft-free towns
and municipalities
1. Friedrichroda
2. Gotha
3. Ohrdruf
4. Tambach-Dietharz
5. Waltershausen
1. Bad Tabarz
2. Drei Gleichen
3. Emleben
4. Georgenthal
5. Hörsel
6. Luisenthal
7. Nesse-Apfelstädt
8. Nessetal
9. Schwabhausen
10. Sonneborn

Verwaltungsgemeinschaften
1. Fahner Höhe; 1. Dachwig; 2. Döllstädt; 3. Gierstädt; 4. Großfahner; 5. Tonna^{1}	2. Nesseaue; 1. Bienstädt; 2. Eschenbergen; 3. Friemar^{1}; 4. Molschleben; 5. Nottleben; 6. Pferdingsleben; 7. Tröchtelborn; 8. Tüttleben; 9. Zimmernsupra
^{1}seat of the Verwaltungsgemeinschaft;^{2}town

== See also ==
- Saxe-Gotha
- Saxe-Coburg-Gotha
