= Sauhügel =

Mountain in Thuringia, Germany

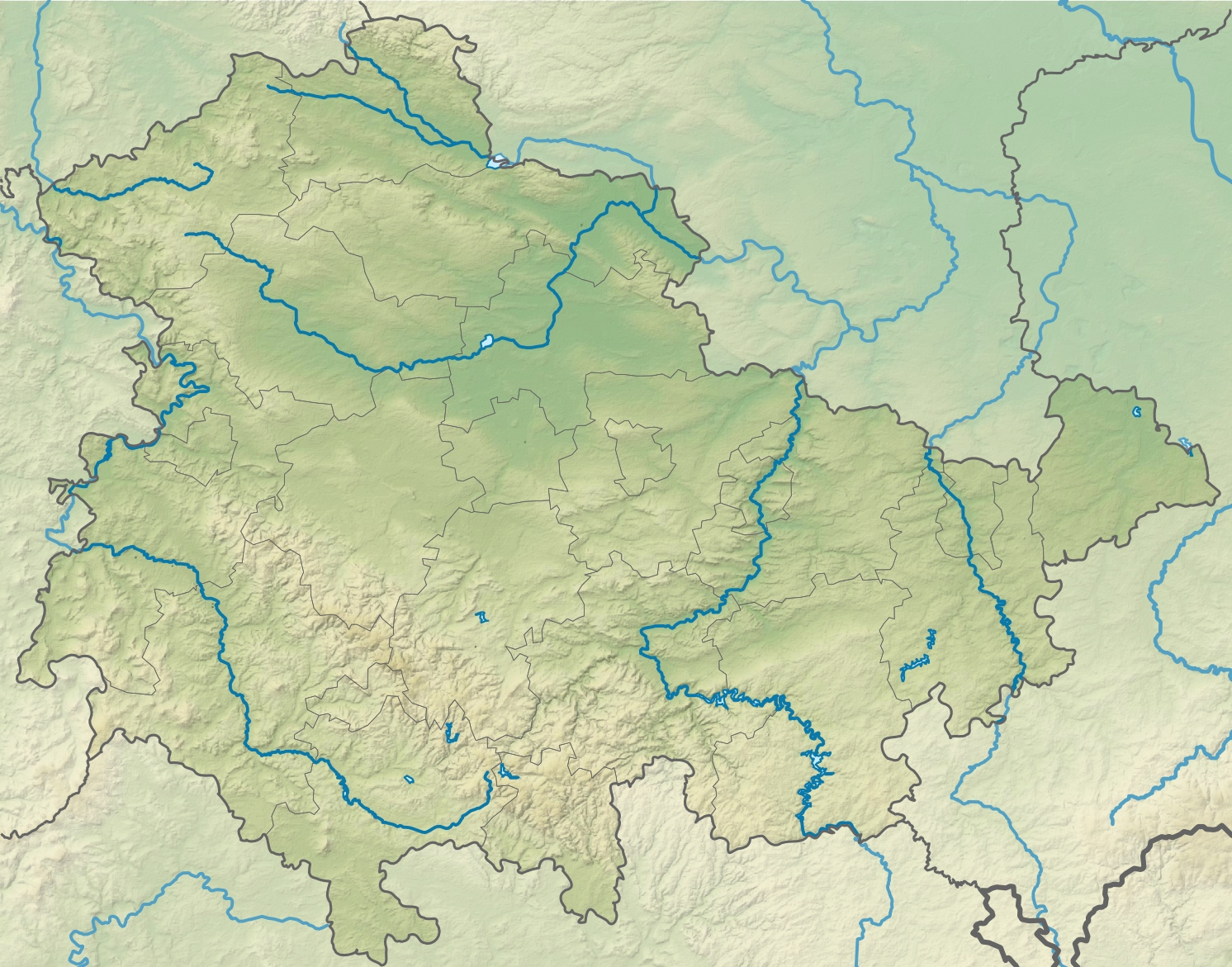
- Location within Thuringia

Highest point
- Elevation: 721.7 m (2,368 ft)
- Coordinates: 50°31′56″N 11°10′48″E

Geography
- Location: Thuringia, Germany
- Parent range: Thuringian Forest

The Sauhügel is a 721.7 m high (above sea level) mountain located in the Thuringian Highland, Thuringia (Germany).

It is located close to the municipality of Lichte and the Leibis-Lichte Dam in the Saalfeld-Rudolstadt district in the Thuringian Forest Nature Park within walking distance of the Rennsteig.

Neighbouring mountains
Description	Height above sea level	Direction	Particularity
Spitzer Berg	790.3 m	N	Coniferous forest
Rauhhügel	801.9 m	E	Observation tower, radio mast
Mutzenberg	770.0 m	SE	Coniferous forest
Mittelberg	803.6 m	S SE	with Kirchberg (688 m)
Hahnberg	685.3 m	S	Pastureland
Apelsberg	785.3 m	S SW	
Rückersbiel	755.6 m	SW	

== See also ==
- List of Mountains and Elevations of Thuringia
