= List of mountains and hills of Thuringia =

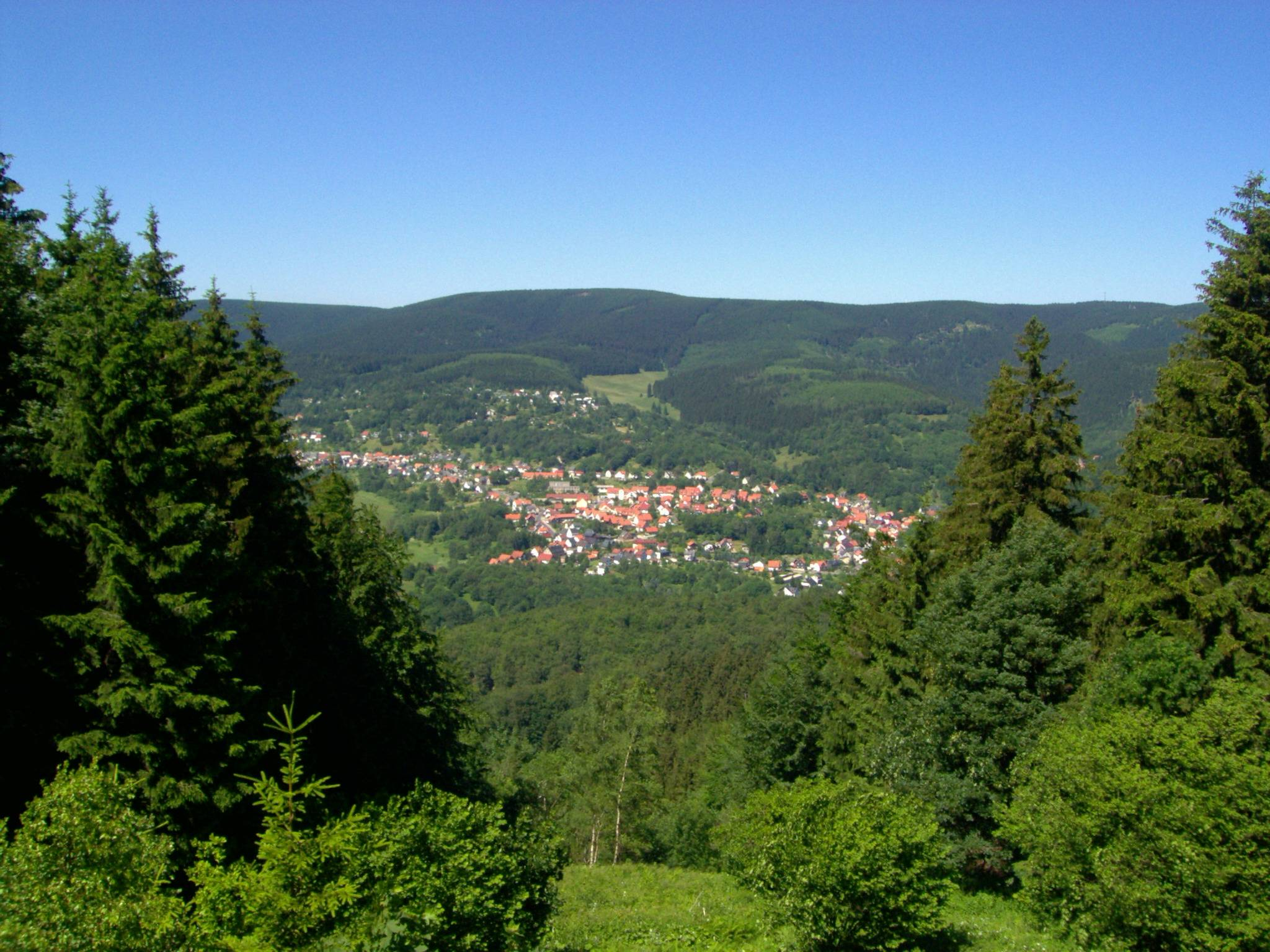
Grosser Beerberg (Thuringian Forest)

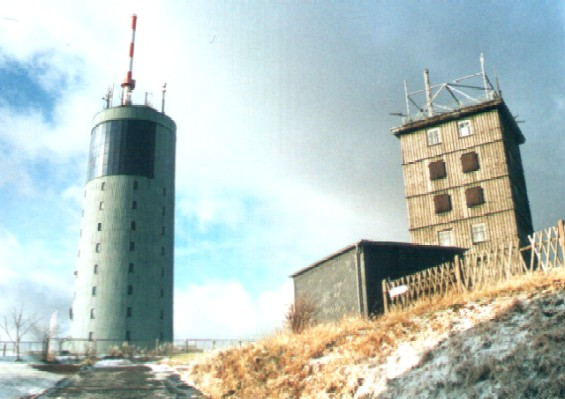
Grosser Inselsberg (Thuringian Forest)

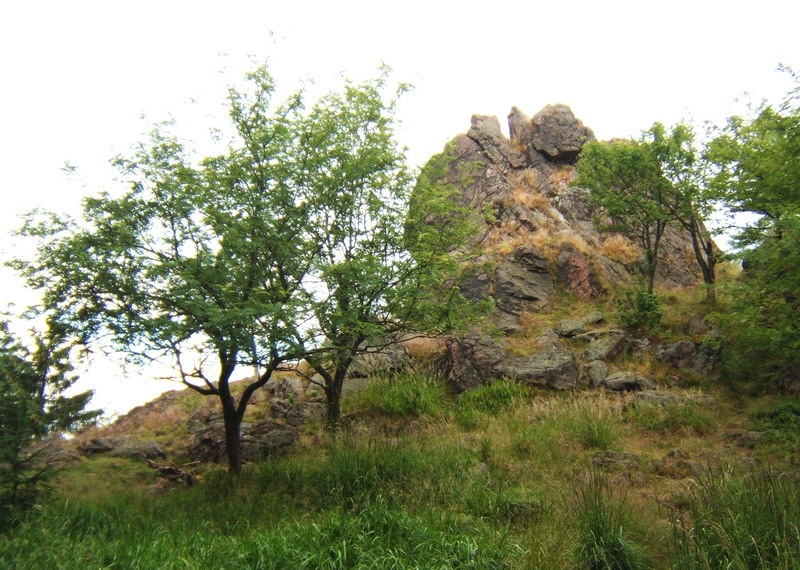
Gebrannter Stein (Thuringian Forest)

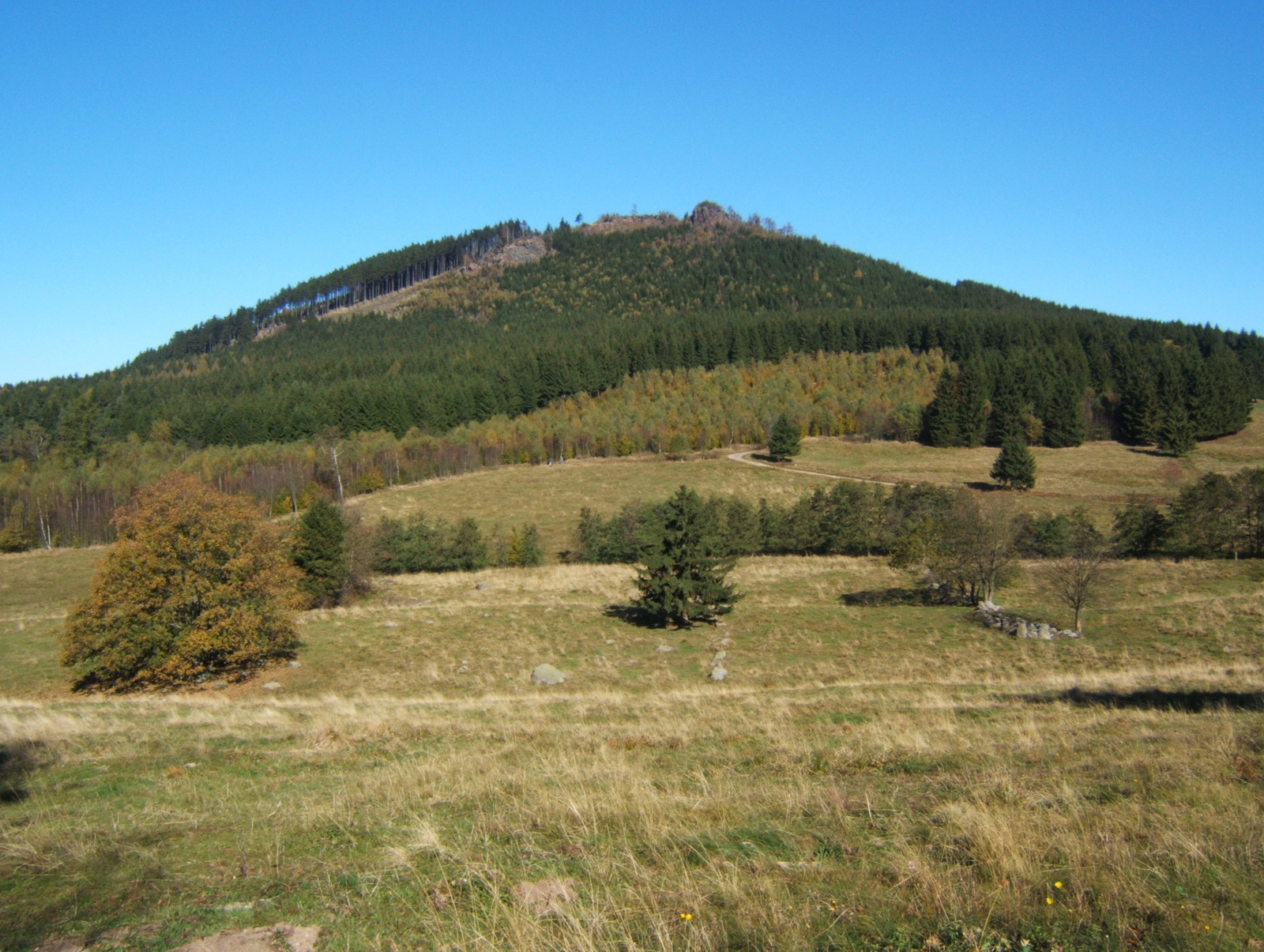
Großer Hermannsberg (Thuringian Forest)

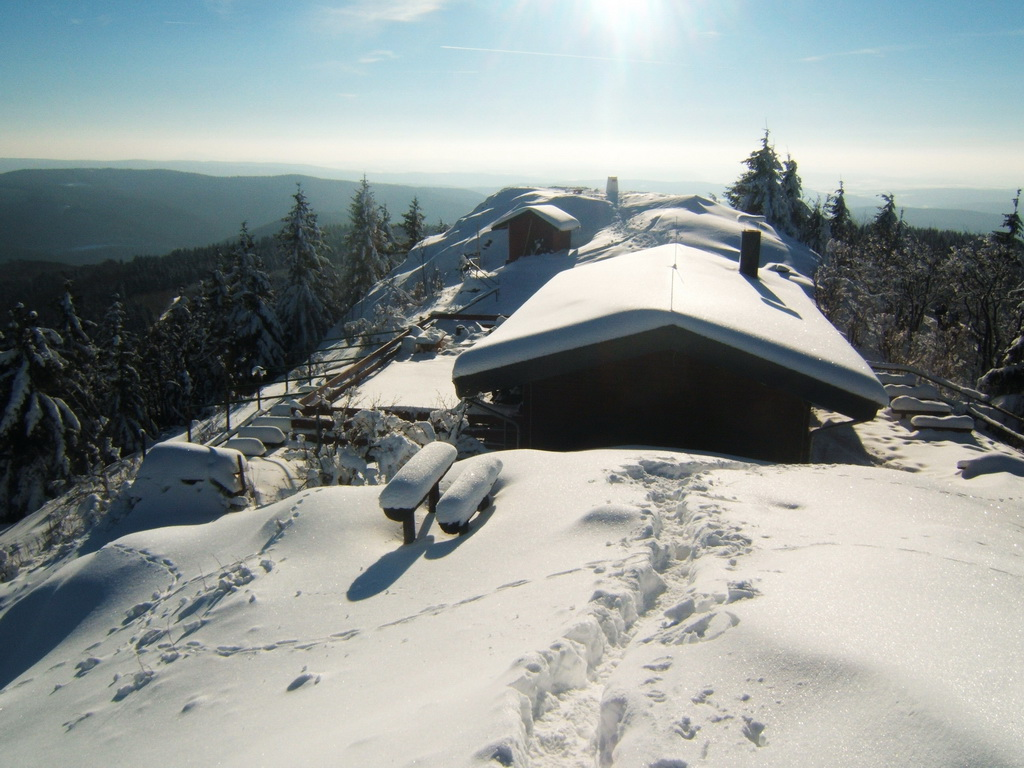
Ruppberg (Thuringian Forest)

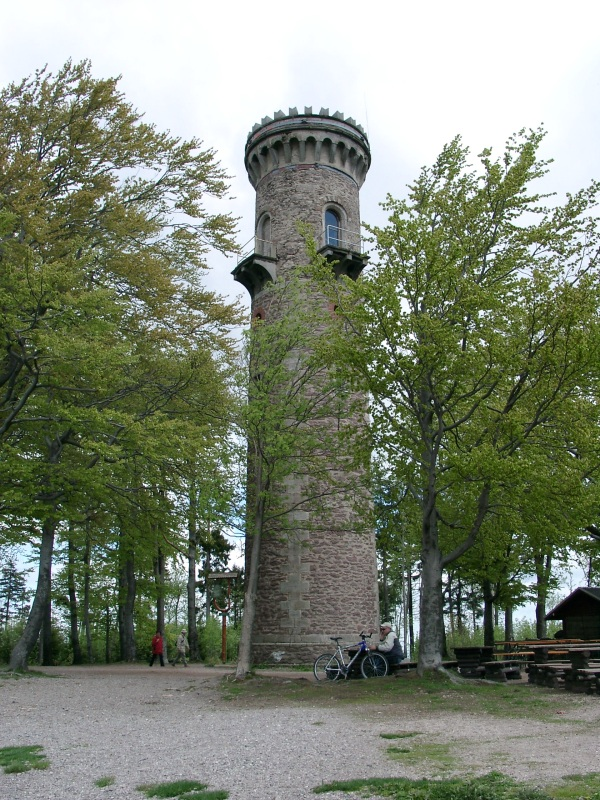
Kickelhahn (Thuringian Forest)

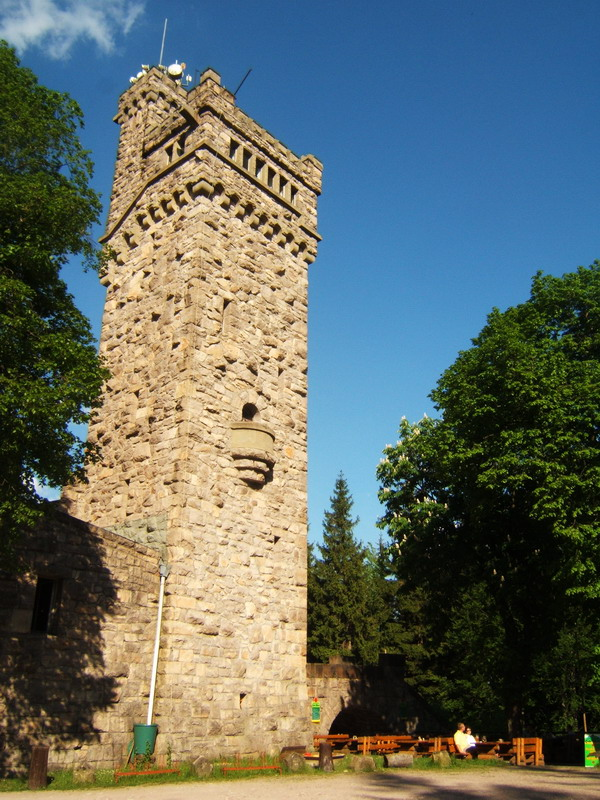
Hohe Warte (Thuringian Forest)

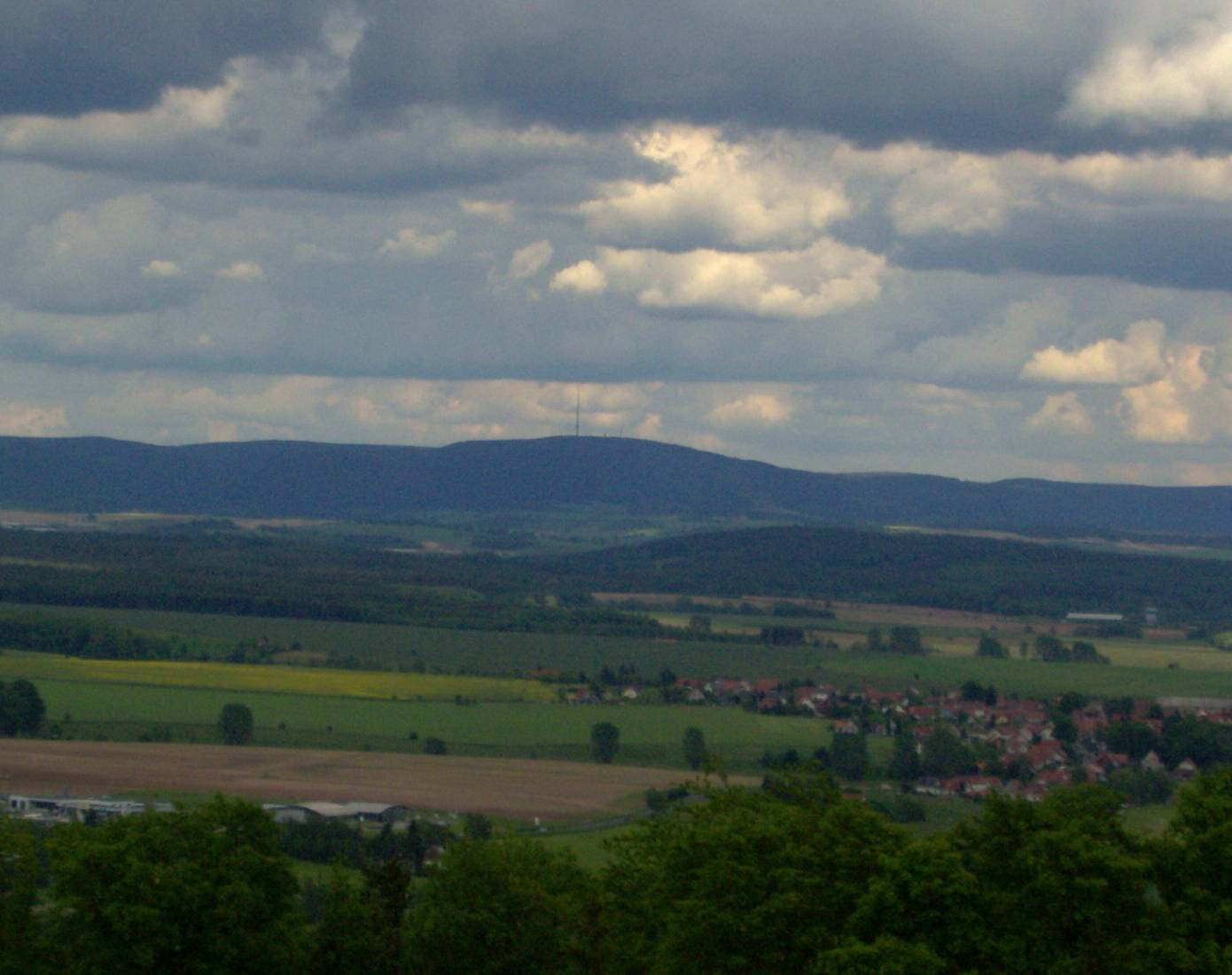
Blessberg (Thuringian Highland)

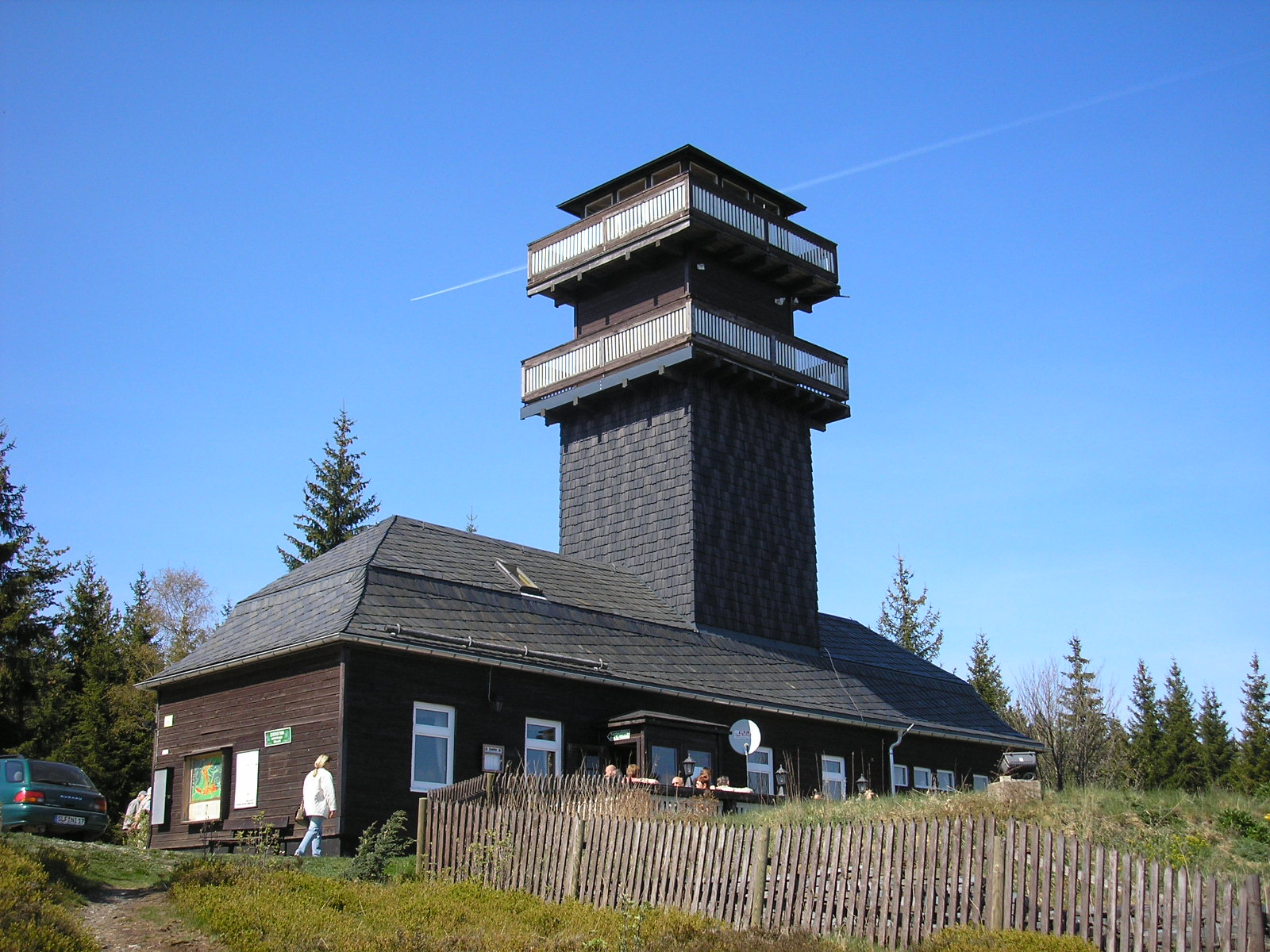
Rauhhügel (Thuringian Highland)

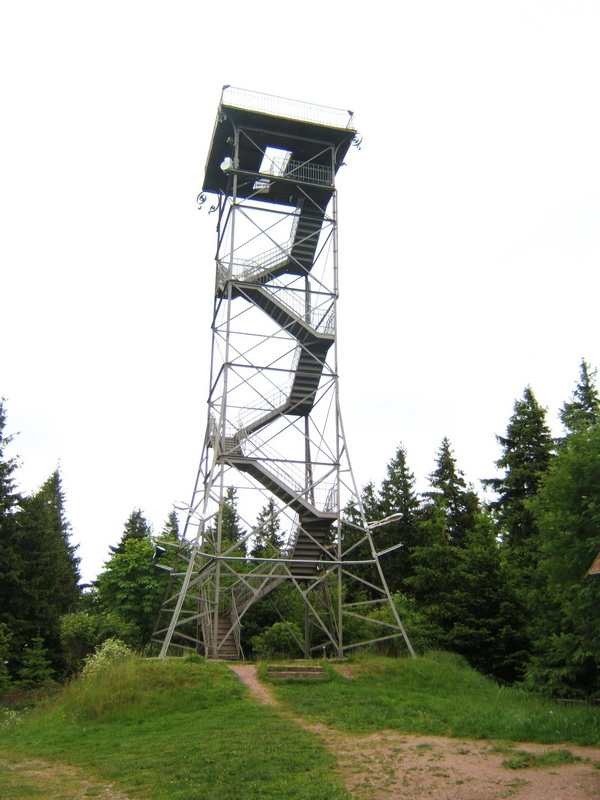
Ringberg (Thuringian Forest)

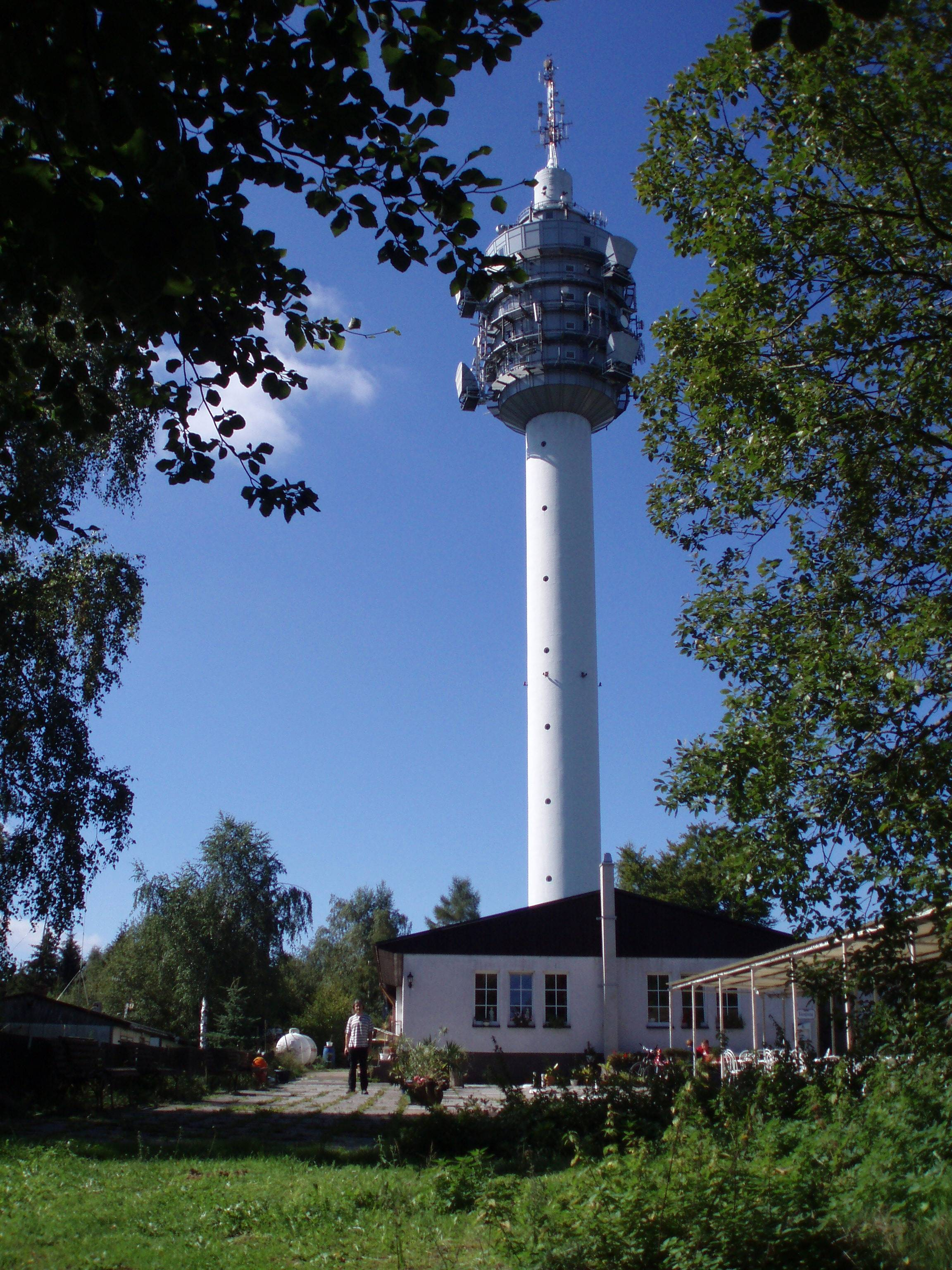
Kulpenberg (Kyffhäuser)

This list of the mountains and hills of Thuringia contains a selection of the mountains and hills to be found in the German federal state of Thuringia. They are arranged alphabetically with their height given in metres (m) above sea level (Normalnull).

== Highest mountains and hills by region ==
The following table lists the highest mountains and hills in each Thuringian region:

Mountain / hill	Height (m)	Region	Regional list	Rural/urban district
Grosser Beerberg	982.9	Thuringian Forest	List	Ilm
Großer Farmdenkopf	868.7	Thuringian Highland	List	Sonneberg
Ellenbogen (813.2 m) (Schnitzersberg: 815.5 m)	815.5	Rhön	List	Wartburg
Wetzstein	792.7	Franconian Forest	List	Saalfeld-Rudolstadt
Schneeberg	692.4	Little Thuringian Forest	List	Suhl (urban district), Hildburghausen
Großer Gleichberg	679.0	Grabfeld	List	Hildburghausen
Pleß	645.4	Salzungen Werra Upland	List	Wartburg
Großer Ehrenberg	635.3	Harz	List	Nordhausen
Halskappe	604.1	Reinsberge	List	Ilmkreis
Singer Berg	582.6	Ilm-Saale Plateau	List	Ilm
Goburg	543.4	Gobert	List	Eichsfeld
Birkenberg	533.4	Ohm Hills	List	Eichsfeld
unnamed hill	522.3	Dün	List	Kyffhäuser
Walleskuppe	513.5	Lange Berge	List	Hildburghausen
Riechheimer Berg	511.8	Weimar Land	List	Ilm
Junkerkuppe	508.9	Südeichsfeld	List	Eichsfeld
Alter Berg	493.9	Hainich	List	Wartburg
Kulm	481.9	Thuringian Woods	List	Saalfeld-Rudolstadt
Großer Ettersberg	477.8	Thuringian Basin	List	Weimar (urban district)
Kulpenberg	473.4	Kyffhäuser	List	Kyffhäuser
unnamed hill	463.2	Hainleite	List	Kyffhäuser
Ziegenrück	460.8	Bleicherode Hills	List	Eichsfeld
Wassenberg	420.8	Drei Gleichen	List	Ilm
Abtsberg	413.0	Fahner Höhe (Fahnersche Höhe)	List	Gotha
Wöllmisse	404.8	Wöllmisse	List	
Künzelsberg	380.1	Schmücke	List	Sömmerda, Kyffhäuser
Zimmerberg	374.4	Windleite	List	Sondershausen, Kyffhäuser
unnamed hill	370.1	Hohe Schrecke	List	Kyffhäuser
Königskopf	357.7	Alter Stolberg	List	Nordhausen
Stunzelberg	347.9	Steigerwald	List	Erfurt (urban district)
Mühlberg	310.4	Finne	List	Sömmerda

== All mountains and hills in Thuringia ==
Name, Height, Location (district(s), region); three "???" means not yet known; please add!

=== Alter Stolberg ===
→ see below in the section on the Harz

=== Bleicherode Hills ===
→ see below in the section on the Ohm Hills

=== Drei Gleichen ===
1. Wassenberg (Wachsenburg Castle) (421 m), Ilm district

=== Dün ===
1. unnamed hill (522.3 m), near Keula, near Keulaer Rondell, Kyffhäuser district
2. Hockelrain (515.4 m), near Kreuzebra, Eichsfeld district
3. Schönberg (498.2 m), near Rehungen, Nordhausen district
4. Heiligenberg (493.6 m), near Beuren, Eichsfeld district

=== Fahner Höhe (Fahnersche Höhe) ===
All hills are in the district of Gotha.

1. Abtsberg (413 m)
2. Bienstädter Berg (384 m)
3. Bienstädter Höhe (345 m)
4. Kirchberg (275 m)
5. Lerchenberg (199 m)

=== Finne ===
All hills are in the district of Sömmerda.

1. Erbsland (353.6 m), near Ostramondra
2. Schockholzberg (347.4 m), near Ostramondra
3. Maienberg (336.3 m), near Bachra
4. Finnberg (332,4 m), near Burgwenden
5. Fuchslöcherberg (329.3 m), near Ostramondra
6. Katzenberg (321.4 m), near Ostramondra
7. Kreuzberg (319.8 m), near Bachra
8. Mühlberg (310.4 m), near Rastenberg

=== Franconian Forest ===
→ For these and other mountains and hills (some outside Thuringia) see the section on Mountains in the article on the Franconian Forest.

1. Wetzstein (792,7 m), near Lehesten, Saalfeld-Rudolstadt district
2. Kulmberg (726.7 m), near Schlegel, Saale-Orla district
3. Klößberg (664 m), near Titschendorf, Saale-Orla district

=== Gleichberge ===
→ For details see the section on mountains and hills in the article on the Gleichberge.

All mountains and hills are near Römhild in the district of Nordhausen:

1. Großer Gleichberg (679 m)
2. Kleiner Gleichberg (641 m)
3. Kuppe (529 m)
4. Schwanberg (518 m)
5. Schwabhäuser Berg (511 m)
6. Rother Kopf (456 m)
7. Alterburg (430 m)
8. Hartenburg (404 m)
9. Eichelberg (382 m)

=== Gobert ===
All hills are located in the district of Eichsfeld

1. Goburg (543.4 m), near Volkerode, near the border with Hesse
2. Rachelsberg (523.4 m), northwest of Wiesenfeld
3. Hesselkopf (504.4 m), west-northwest of Wiesenfeld
4. Pfaffschwender Kuppe (493.6 m), southwest of Pfaffschwende
5. Meinhard (491.3 m), between Neuerode and Kella, border with Hesse
6. Uhlenkopf (480 m), west of Volkerode, border with Hesse
7. Kahlenberg (460.8 m), northeast of Asbach
8. Iberg (426.1 m), east of Asbach

=== Grabfeld ===
→ For these and other mountains and hills (including some outside Thuringia) see the section on mountains and hills in the article on Grabfeld.

1. the Gleichberge (max. 679 m): see also the section above on the Gleichberge
2. Dietrichsberg (536 m), near Neubrunn
3. Großkopf (536 m), near Westenfeld
4. Heiliger Berg (530 m), near Henneberg
5. Ransberg (514 m), near Bibra

=== Hainich / Südeichsfeld ===
1. Rain (516.7 m), Eichsfeld district, near Effelder
2. Junkerkuppe (508.9 m), Eichsfeld district, Eichsfeld-Hainich-Werratal Nature Park, Höheberg
3. Heldrastein (503 m), Wartburgkreis, Eichsfeld-Hainich-Werratal Nature Park
4. Eichstruther Kopf (503 m), Eichsfeld district, Eichsfeld-Hainich-Werratal Nature Park
5. Alter Berg (493.9 m), Wartburgkreis, Hainich National Park
6. Hohes Rode (493.0 m)
7. Craulaer Kreuz (483.2 m)
8. Renn (473.2 m)
9. Lohberg (468.2 m)
10. Winterstein (467.6 m), Unstrut-Hainich district, Eichsfeld-Hainich-Werratal Nature Park
11. Otterbühl (465.6 m)
12. Sommerstein (461.8 m)
13. Alter Busch (454.7 m)
14. Pfaffenkopf (454 m), Eichsfeld district, Eichsfeld-Hainich-Werratal Nature Park
15. Iberg (453.2 m), Eichsfeld district, Eichsfeld-Hainich-Werratal Nature Park
16. Haardt (451.3 m)
17. Steiger (448.9 m)
18. Lindenhecke (447 m) Wartburgkreis, Eichsfeld-Hainich-Werratal Nature Park
19. Totenkopf (444 m), Unstrut-Hainich district, Hainich National Park
20. Rittergasserberg (440.3 m)
21. Wartenberg (429.9 m)
22. Eichenberg (421.5 m), Unstrut-Hainich district, Eichsfeld- Hainich-Werratal Nature Park / Hainich National Park
23. Mittelberg (413.3 m)
24. Harsberg (409.7 m)
25. Pfarrkopf (399.4 m)
26. Burgberg (398.0 m)
27. Schlossberg (377.0 m)
28. Elsberg (360.5 m)

=== Hainleite ===
1. Straußberg (463.2 m), between Straußberg and Immenrode, Kyffhäuser district
2. unnamed hill (452,3 m), near Großlohra-Friedrichslohra, Nordhausen district
3. unnamed hill (445.5 m), eastern foothills of the Straußberg near Großfurra, Kyffhäuser district
4. Wolfshof (441.6 m), near Sondershausen, Kyffhäuser district
5. Possen (431.5 m), west-northwestern foothills of the Wolfshof
6. Löhchen (428.1 m), near Kleinberndten, Kyffhäuser district
7. Frauenberg (411.3 m), near Sondershausen, Kyffhäuser district
8. Kuhberg (405.8 m), near Seega, aber Gemarkung Oberbösa, Kyffhäuser district
9. Heidelberg (403.3 m), near Hachelbich, Kyffhäuser district
10. unnamed hill (391.0 m), near Bilzingsleben-Düppel, district Sömmerda
11. Pfarrkopf (309.0 m), near Günserode, Kyffhäuser district
12. Wächterberg (302,7 m), with the nearby Upper Sachsenburg, near Oldisleben-Sachsenburg, Kyffhäuser district

also:

- Spur on which Lohra Castlestands, near Großlohra, Nordhausen district

=== Harz ===
→ For these and other mountains and hills (including those outside Thuringia) see List of mountains in the Harz.

All mountains and hills (incl. those of Alter Stolberg and Rüdigsdorf Switzerland) are located in the district of Nordhausen.

1. Großer Ehrenberg (635.3 m), near Rothesütte
2. Vogelheerd (634.4 m), near Rothesütte
3. Großer Steierberg (619.5 m), near Rothesütte
4. Kleiner Ehrenberg (610.1 m), near Rothesütte
5. Stierberg (602,4 m), near Rothesütte
6. Poppenberg (600.8 m), near Ilfeld
7. Birkenkopf (599.8 m), near Neustadt Dam
8. Spitzer Klinz (585.1 m), near Rothesütte and Sülzhayn
9. Dornkopf (579.0 m), near Rothesütte
10. Krödberg (577.8 m), near Sülzhayn
11. Langenberg (575.8 m) and Langer Berg (515.9 m), near Sülzhayn, on border with Lower Saxony
12. Zwergsberg (570.7 m), between Netzkater and Rothesütte
13. Bettler (569.0 m), near Neustadt Dam
14. Giersberg (567.4 m), between Rothesütte and Netzkater
15. Solberg (552,9 m), between Rothesütte and Netzkater
16. Honigberg (551.8 m), near Rothesütte
17. Kleiner Steierberg (548.9 m), near Rothesütte
18. Stehlenberg (548.7 m), near Rothesütte and Sülzhayn
19. Butterberg (539.5 m), between Eisfelder Talmühle station and Birkenmoor
20. Hagenberg (538.6 m), between Netzkater and Birkenmoor
21. Hohenstein (536.3 m), near Sülzhayn
22. Eulenkopf (534.5 m), between Rothesütte and Netzkater
23. Mittelberg (533.0 m), near Neustadt Dam
24. Großer Hengstrücken (530.8 m), between Rothesütte and Netzkater
25. Heidelberg (527.5 m), by Neustadt Dam
26. Heiligenberg (524.7 m), near Sülzhayn
27. Sandlünz (516.2 m), near Netzkater
28. Kleiner Schumannsberg (512,0 m), near Haltepunkt Tiefenbachmühle
29. Sattelkopf (510.4 m), between Rothesütte and Netzkater
30. Kaulberg (511.7 m), near Ilfeld
31. Steierberg (508.9 m), near Sülzhayn
32. Kesselberg (507.0 m), near Sülzhayn
33. Großer Schumannsberg (497.2 m), near Eisfelder Talmühle station
34. Totenkopf (492,6 m), near Appenrode
35. Schimmelshütchen (475.9 m), near Sülzhayn
36. Sülzberg (464.8 m), near Sülzhayn
37. Hegersberg (461.6 m), near Appenrode
38. Ochsenkopf (460.3 m), near Netzkater
39. Scharfenberg (457.6 m), near Sülzhayn
40. Silberkopf (441.4 m), near Ilfeld
41. Burgberg der Ruine Ebersburg (ca. 440 m), near Herrmannsacker
42. Burgberg der Burgruine Hohnstein (402,9 m), near Neustadt
43. Forstköpfe (402,4 m), near Werna
44. Großer Mittelberg (400.1 m), near Ellrich
45. Müncheberg (392,5 m), near Appenrode
46. Zankköpfe (387.1 m), near Werna
47. Großer Dörnsenberg (386.4 m), near Ellrich
48. Heidberg (386.2 m), near Sülzhayn
49. Sackberg (374.4 m), near Sülzhayn
50. Schloßkopf (371.1 m), near Neustadt
51. Mühlberg (363.8 m), near Appenrode
52. Königskopf (357.7 m), near Stempeda, in Alter Stolberg
53. Eichenberg (353.6 m), near Herrmannsacker
54. Buchholzer Berg (350.1 m), near Buchholz, in Rüdigsdorf Switzerland
55. Kleiner Mittelberg (346.2 m), near Ellrich
56. Kohnstein (334.9 m), near Nordhausen
57. Reesberg (325.2 m), near Urbach, in Alter Stolberg
58. Weidenberg (322,9 m), near Rüdigsdorf, in Rüdigsdorf Switzerland
59. Sandkopf (317.6 m), near Appenrode
60. Petersdorfer Berg (Harzrigi; 316.6 m), near Petersdorf, in Rüdigsdorf Switzerland
61. Eichenberg (303.7 m), near Petersdorf, in Rüdigsdorf Switzerland
62. Kuhberg (302,7 m), near Rüdigsdorf, in Rüdigsdorf Switzerland
63. Pfennigsberg (300.3 m), near Petersdorf, in Rüdigsdorf Switzerland
64. Bornberg (295.5 m), near Rüdigsdorf, in Rüdigsdorf Switzerland
65. Lichte Höhe (295.5 m), near Rüdigsdorf, in Rüdigsdorf Switzerland
66. Zinkenberg (290.5 m), between Leimbach and Steigerthal, in Alter Stolberg
67. Stöckey (277.8 m), near Krimderode, in the Rüdigsdorf Switzerland
68. Glockenstein (273.2 m), near Niedersachswerfen, in Rüdigsdorf Switzerland
69. Danielskopf (272.6 m), near Krimderode, in Rüdigsdorf Switzerland
70. Sichelberg (263.0 m), near Krimderode/Ellersiedlung, in Rüdigsdorf Switzerland
71. Brommelsberg (256.3 m), near Nordhausen, in Rüdigsdorf Switzerland
72. Kirchberg (252,9 m), near Niedersachswerfen, in Rüdigsdorf Switzerland
73. Kuhberg (245.4 m), near Krimderode, in Rüdigsdorf Switzerland

in addition there is the following of unknown height:

- Burgberg der Heinrichsburg, near Neustadt

=== Schmücke ===
- Künzelsberg (380.1 m), between Hauteroda und Beichlingen, Kyffhäuserkreis/Sömmerda county
- Monraburg (377.0 m), near Burgwenden, Sömmerda county
- Wendenburg (353.8 m), near Burgwenden, Sömmerda county
- Hundertäcker (351.6 m), between Hauteroda and Beichlingen, Kyffhäuserkreis/Sömmerda county
- Monnerkopf (310.7 m), between Burgwenden and Hauteroda, Sömmerda county/Kyffhäuserkreis
- Scharfer Berg (249.5 m), between Gorsleben and Heldrungen, Kyffhäuserkreis
- Eichberg (247.2 m), between Hauteroda and Beichlingen, Kyffhäuserkreis/Sömmerda county
- Stubenberg (198.0 m), near Heldrungen, Kyffhäuserkreis

=== Thuringian Highland and Thuringian Forest ===
‣ Main summits are in boldface. Side-peaks are indented under the appropriate main peak.

‣ Abbreviations:

**L** = **L**ookout mountain i.e. mountaintop with good viewing point **N** = **N**orth slope **R** = **R**ennsteig i.e. summit lies near the hiking trail of Rennsteig **S** = **S**outh-west slope	**TH** = **T**huringian **H**ighland **TF** = **T**huringian **F**orest

1. **Grosser Beerberg** (982.9 m) (R/S), Ilm district, TF
  - Wildekopf (943 m), Schmalkalden-Meiningen district, TF
  - Sommerbachskopf (941 m) (L), Schmalkalden-Meiningen district, TF
  - Unterer Beerberg (891 m) (L), Suhl, TF
  - Farmenfleck (890 m) (L), Schmalkalden-Meiningen district, TF
2. **Schneekopf** (978 m) (L/R), Ilm district, TF
  - Teufelskreise (967 m) (L), Ilm district, TF
  - Fichtenkopf (944 m) (L), Suhl, TF
  - Sachsenstein (915 m) (L), Ilm district, TF
  - Brand (885 m) (L), Gehlberg, Ilm district, TF
  - Goldlauterberg (874 m) (L), Suhl, TF
3. **Grosser Finsterberg** (944 m) (A/R), Ilm district, TF
  - Finsterberger Koepfchen ("Kleiner Finsterberg"; 875 m) (L), Ilm district, TF
4. **Grosser Inselsberg** (916.5 m) (L/N/R/S), Schmalkalden-Meiningen, TF
5. Großer Hermannsberg (867 m) (A/S), Schmalkalden-Meiningen, TF
6. Hettstädt (808.1 m), TH
7. Mittelberg (803.6 m), Lichte, TH, R
8. Seimberg (803 m), Brotterode, TF
9. Rauhhügel (801.9 m), Schmiedefeld (Lichtetal), TS
10. Spitzer Berg (790.3 m), Lichte TH
11. Meuselbacher Kuppe (786 m) (L), Meuselbach-Schwarzmühle, TH
12. Apelsberg (780 m), Lichte, TH, R
13. Mutzenberg (770 m), Lichte, TH
14. Rückertsbiel (756 m), Lichte, TH
15. Sauhügel (722 m), Lichte, TH
16. Rehhecke (Thuringian Highland) (707 m), Lichte, TH
17. Assberg (Thuringian Highland) (703 m), Lichte, TH
18. Hopfenberg (536.1 m), Waltershausen, TF
19. Hahnberg (686 m), Lichte, TH
20. Milmesberg (461.2 m), Wartburgkreis district, (L) TF
21. Ziegenberg (Thuringian Highland) (460 m), Saalfeld-Rudolstadt district, TH
22. Queste (Berg) (425 m), Schmalkalden, TF
23. Stechberg (342 m), Wartburgkreis district, TF

== See also ==
- Mountain
  - List of the highest mountains in Germany
  - List of mountain and hill ranges in Germany
