= Hahnberg (Thuringian Highland) =

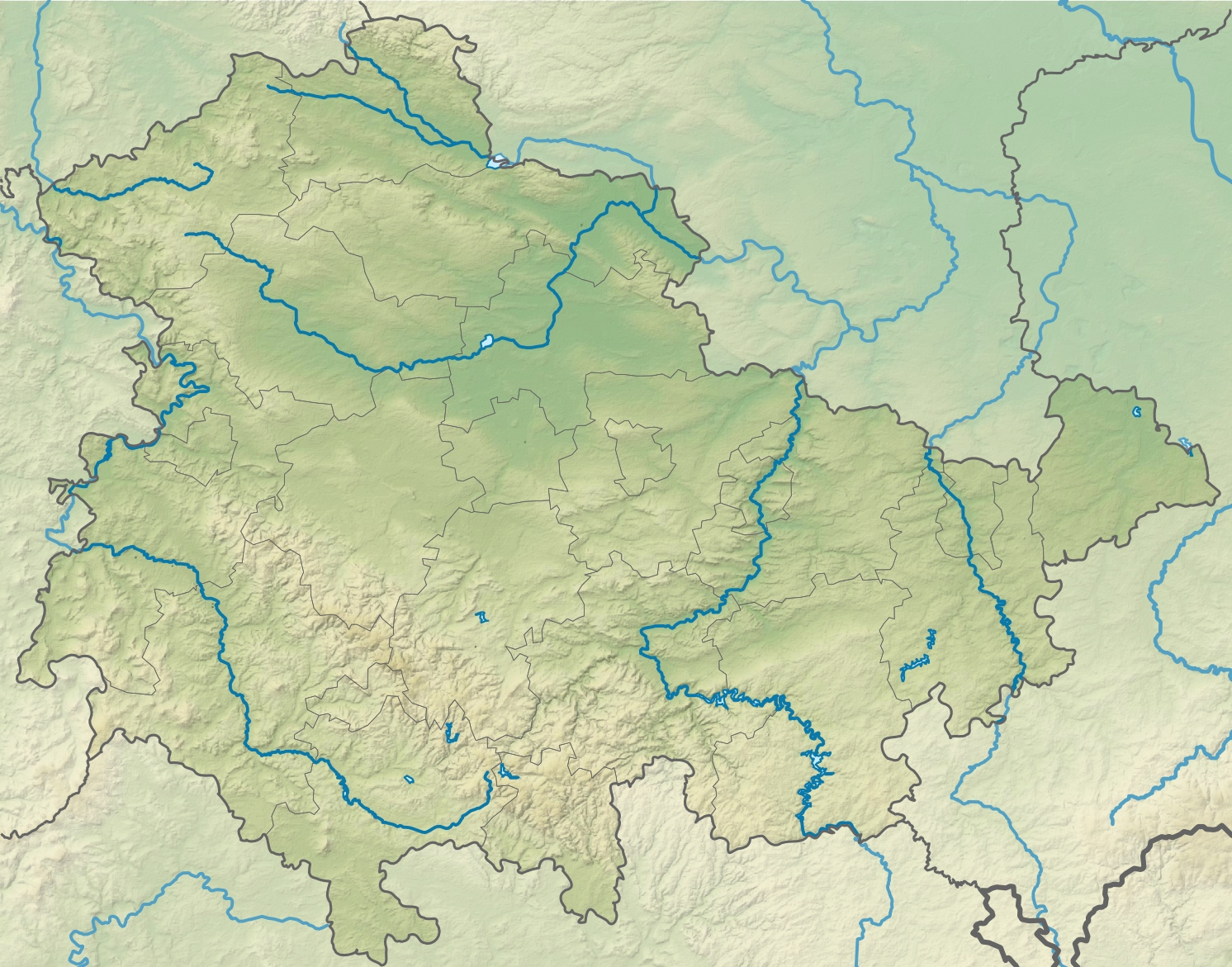
- Location within Thuringia

Highest point
- Elevation: 685.3 m (2,248 ft)
- Coordinates: 50°31′57″N 11°10′49″E

Geography
- Location: Thuringia, Germany
- Parent range: Thuringian Forest

The Hahnberg is a 685.3 m high (above sea level) slightly undulatory tableland located in the Thuringian Highland, Thuringia (Germany).

It is located close to the municipality of Lichte and the Leibis-Lichte Dam in the Saalfeld-Rudolstadt district in the Thuringian Forest Nature Park. The section of the Rennsteig walkway between Neuhaus am Rennweg, Piesau, and Spechtsbrunn runs close to the Hahnberg plateau.

Neighbouring mountains
Description	Height above sea level	Direction	Particularity
Spitzer Berg	790.3 m	N NE	Coniferous forest
Mutzenberg	770.0.6 m	NE	Coniferous forest
Rauhhügel	801.9 m	NE	Observation tower, radio mast
Mittelberg	803.6 m	SE	Coniferous forest
Apelsberg	785.3 m	SW	Coniferous forest
Rückersbiel	755.6 m	W	with the Sauhuegel (722 m, W)

== See also ==
- List of Mountains and Elevations of Thuringia
