= Mittelberg (Thuringian Highland) =

Mountain in Thuringia, Germany

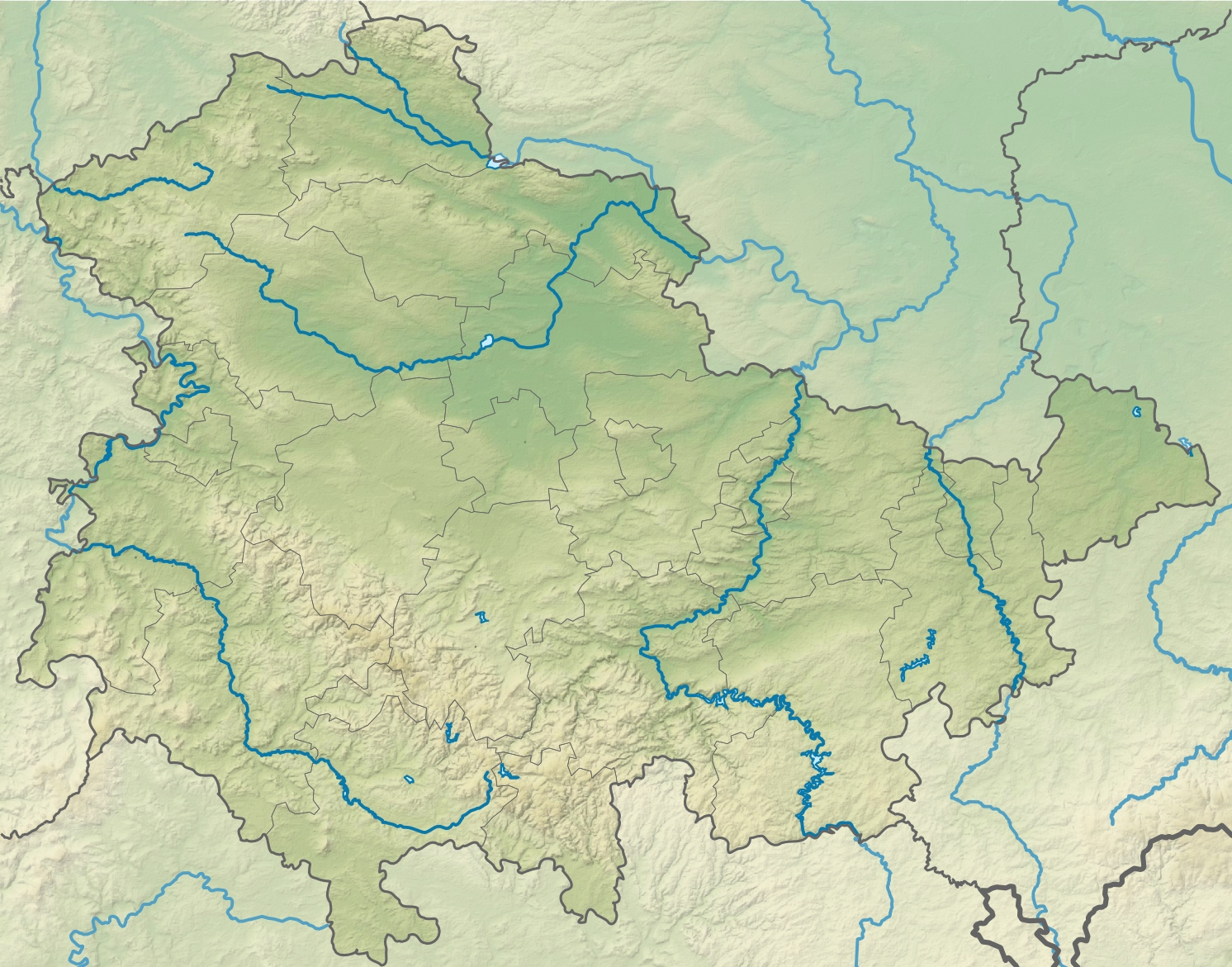
- Location within Thuringia

Highest point
- Elevation: 803.6 m (2,636 ft)
- Coordinates: 50°30′42″N 11°11′32″E

Geography
- Location: Thuringia, Germany
- Parent range: Thuringian Forest

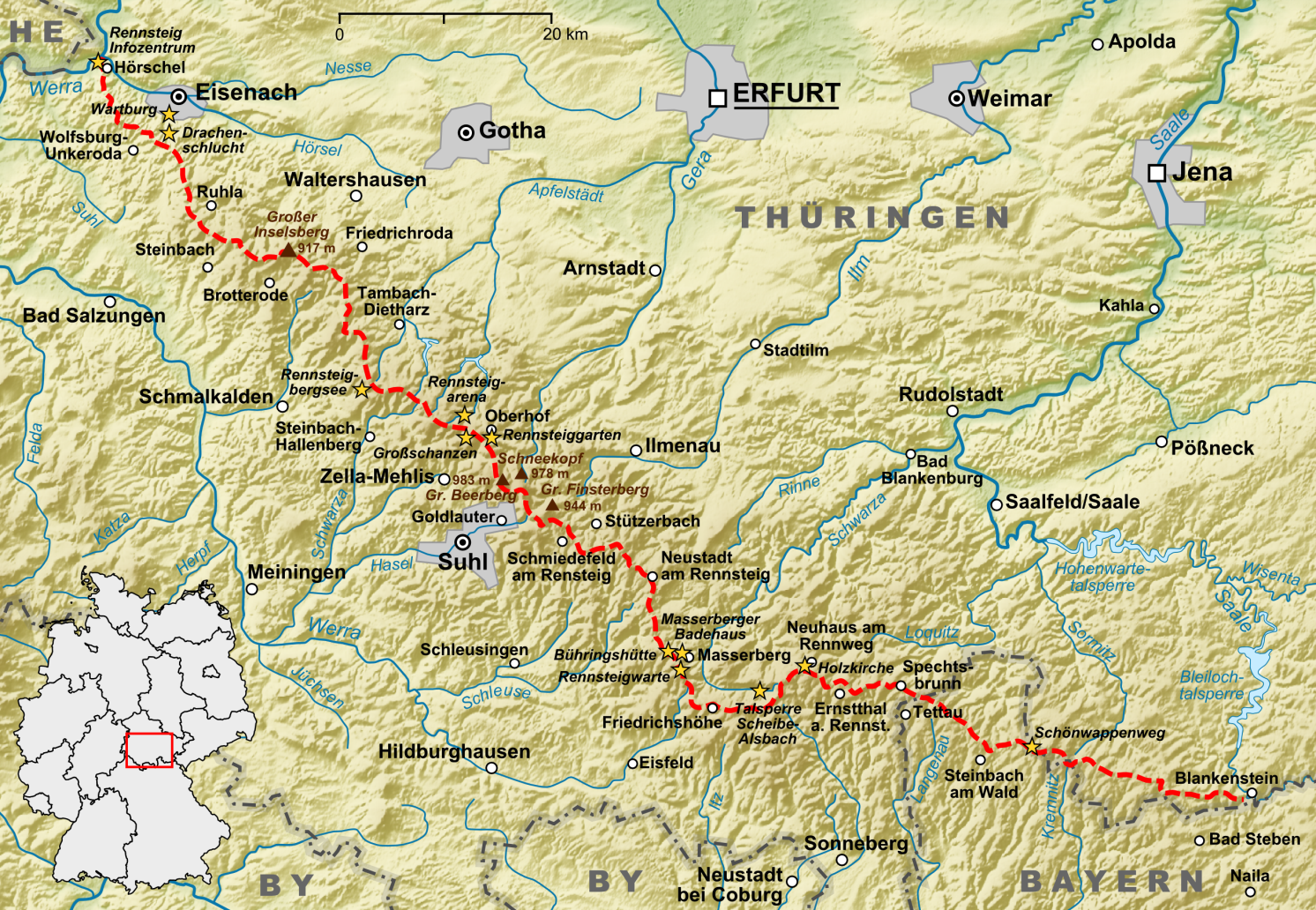
Map of the Rennsteig trail

The Mittelberg (German pronunciation: [ˈmɪtl̩bɛʁk]) is an 803.6 m high (above sea level) mountain located in the Thuringian Highland, Thuringia (Germany).

It is located close to the municipalities of Piesau and Lichte and the Leibis-Lichte Dam in the Saalfeld-Rudolstadt district in the Thuringian Forest Nature Park.

The section of the Rennsteig walkway between Neuhaus am Rennweg, Ernstthal am Rennsteig, and Spechtsbrunn runs close to the mountain.

Neighbouring mountains
Description	Height above sea level	Direction	Particularity
Apelsberg	785.3 m	W	Coniferous forest
Rückersbiel	755.6 m	W NW	with the Sauhuegel (722 m, W)
Hahnberg	685.3 m	NW	Pastureland
Mutzenberg	770.0.6 m	N NE	Coniferous forest
Rauhhügel	801.9 m	N NE	Observation tower, radio mast

== See also ==
- List of Mountains and Elevations of Thuringia
