= Rückersbiel =

Mountain in Thuringia, Germany

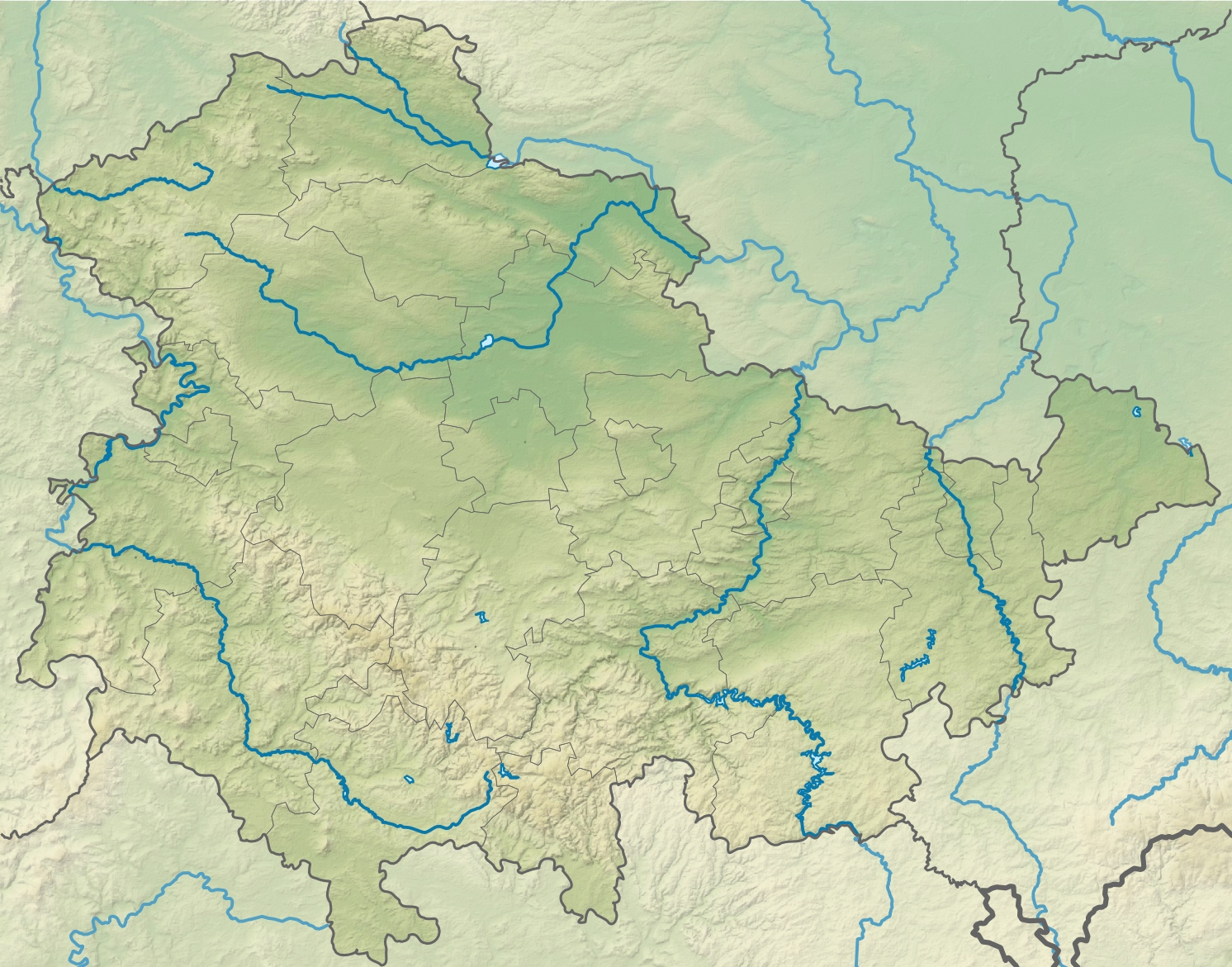
- Location within Thuringia

Highest point
- Elevation: 755.6 m (2,479 ft)
- Coordinates: 50°31′31″N 11°9′46″E

Geography
- Location: Thuringia, Germany
- Parent range: Thuringian Forest

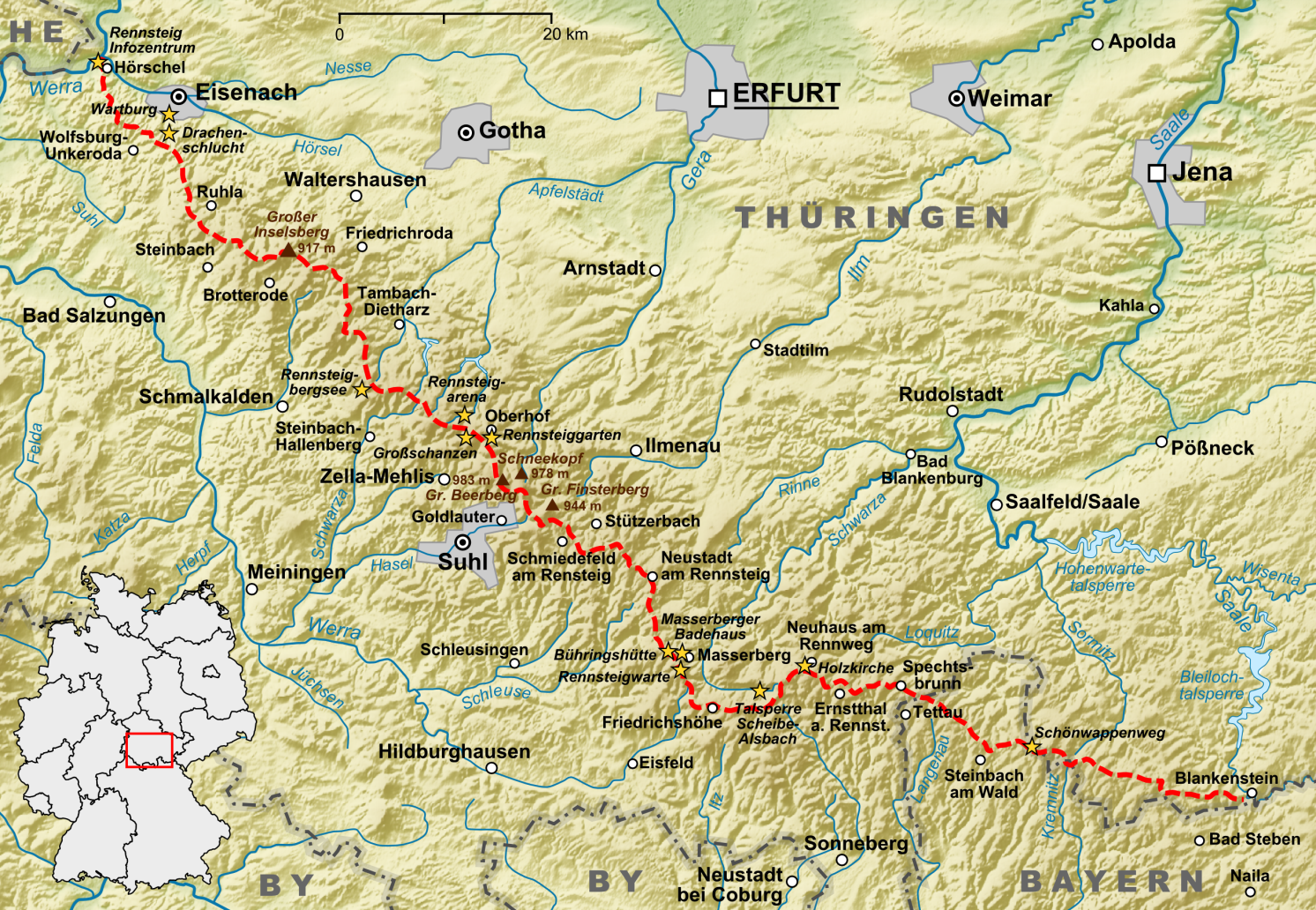
The Rennsteig walkway

The Rückersbiel a 755.6 m high (above sea level) mountain located in the Thuringian Highland, Thuringia (Germany).

It is located close to the municipality of Lichte and the Leibis-Lichte Dam in the Saalfeld-Rudolstadt district in the Thuringian Forest Nature Park. The section of the Rennsteig walkway between Neuhaus am Rennweg and Ernsttal am Rennsteig runs close to the Rückertsbiel plateau.

Neighbouring mountains
Description	Height above sea level	Direction	Particularity
Hahnberg	685.3 m	E	Pastureland
Mutzenberg	770.0 m	E NE	Coniferous forest
Rauhhügel	801.9 m	E NE	Observation tower, radio mast
Mittelberg	803.6 m	E SE	Coniferous forest

== See also ==
- List of Mountains and Elevations of Thuringia
