= Aßberg (Thuringian Highland) =

Mountain in Germany

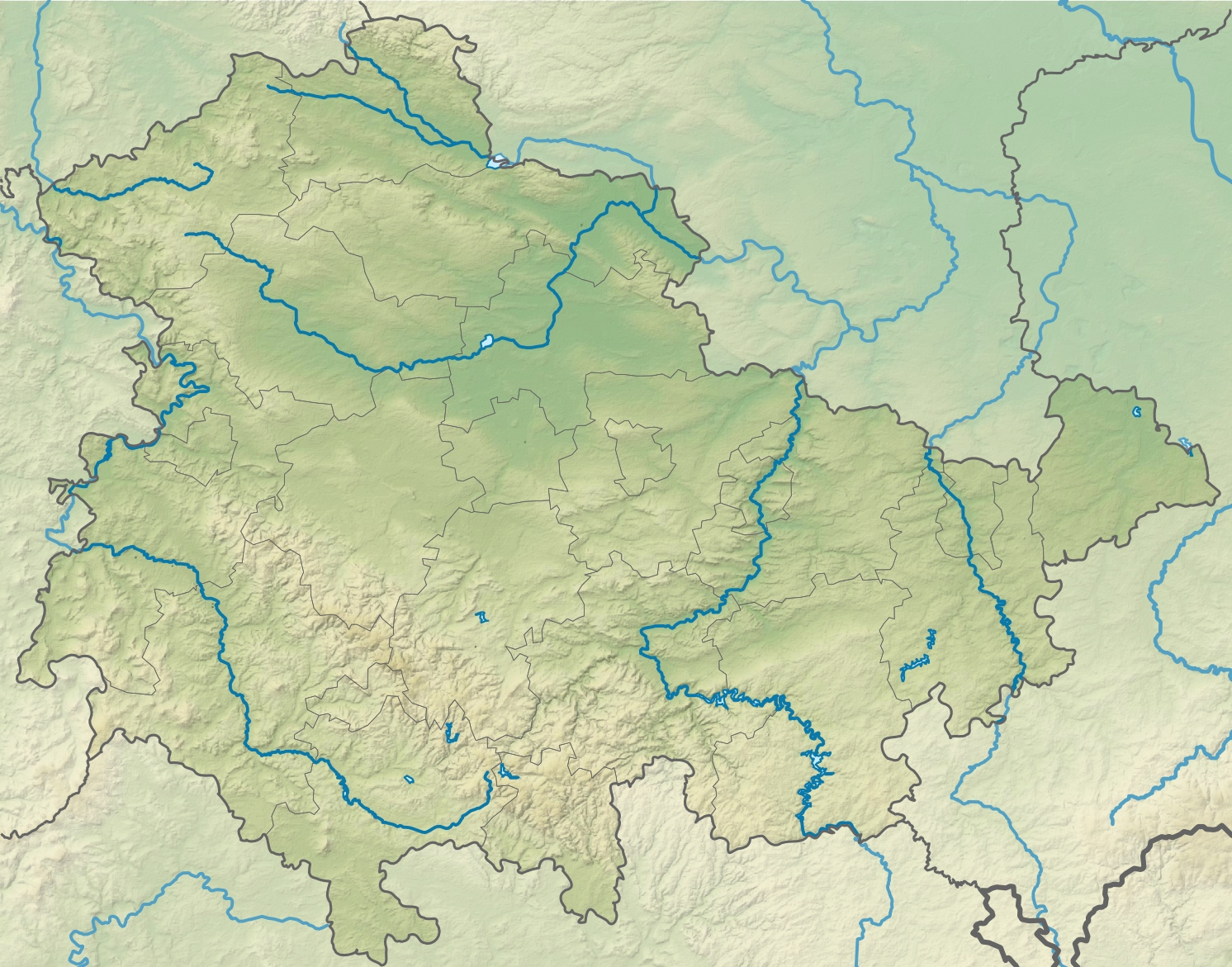
- Location within Thuringia

Highest point
- Elevation: 703 m (2,306 ft)
- Coordinates: 50°33′53″N 11°12′50″E

Geography
- Location: Thuringia, Germany
- Parent range: Thuringian Forest

The Aßberg is a 703-m high mountain located in the Thuringian Highland region of Thuringia, Germany.

It is located close to the municipalities of Deesbach, Meura, Reichmannsdorf, and Schmiedefeld and the Leibis-Lichte Dam in the Saalfeld-Rudolstadt district in the Thuringian Forest Nature Park.

Neighbouring mountains
Description	Height above sea level	Direction	Particularity
Rehhecke	707.0 m	N NW	Coniferous forest
Rauhhügel	801.9 m	S	Observation tower, radio mast
Mutzenberg	770.0 m	SW	
Spitzer Berg	790.3 m	W SW	Coniferous forest

== See also ==
- List of Mountains and Elevations of Thuringia
