= Heydauer Berg =

Heydaer Berg
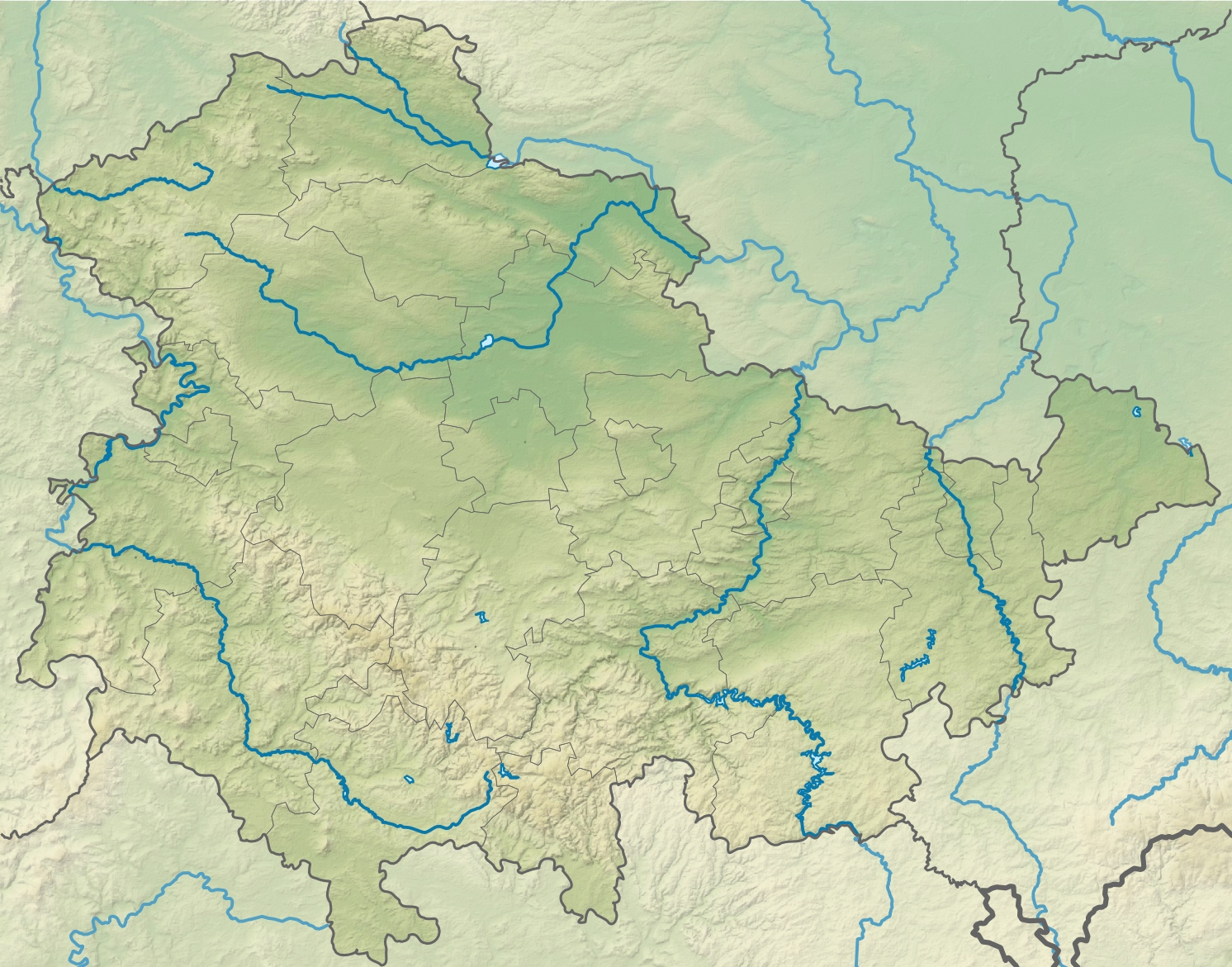
- Location within Thuringia

Highest point
- Elevation: 605.4 m above sea level (NHN) (1,986 ft)
- Prominence: 168 m ↓ Sandschlag between Martinroda and Heyda
- Isolation: 7.0 km → northeast hillside of the Hangeberg (702 m, Thuringian Forest west of Ilmenau)
- Coordinates: 50°44′58″N 10°56′00″E

Geography
- Location: Between Plaue and Ilmenau, Ilm-Kreis, Central Thuringia, Germany
- Parent range: Reinsberge

Geology
- Rock type: Muschelkalk

The Heydaer Berg between Plaue and Ilmenau in the Thuringian county of Ilm-Kreis is a hill ridge of the Reinsberge which reaches its highest point at the Halskappe which is 605.4 m above sea level (NHN),, shortly before the better known Reinsburg (604.1 m).

== Geography and geology ==
The Heydaer Berg, located at the southern end of the Reinsberge and northeast end of the Heydaer Berg, lies between Schmerfeld to the northeast, Heyda to the southeast, Martinroda to the southwest and Neusiß to the northwest. It is about 4 kilometres long and a maximum of about 1 kilometre wide. Its southern continuation is the Veronikaberg (552.2 m) which rises adjacent to the Reinsberge to the south. The hill is a muschelkalk formation and lies on the southeast boundary of the Ohrdruf Plateau facing the Paulinzella Foreland.

== Summit ==
The Halskappe rises above the confluence (327.4 m) of the Zahmer and Wilder Gera in Plaue by around 278 metres, the Prolle (406.4 m) to the southeast by around 199 metres and the Heyda Reservoir (maximum surface elevation 416.6 m) by around 188.8 m. Its topographic isolation is about 7 kilometres, extending to the Thuringian Forest to the southwest, and it has a prominence of just under 170 m.

== See also ==
- List of mountains and hills of Thuringia
