= Finnberg =

Finnberg is a surname. Notable people with the surname include:

- Axel Finnberg (born 1971), German tennis player
- Gustaf Wilhelm Finnberg (1784–1833), Finnish painter

== See also ==
- Fineberg
