= Mellenbach-Glasbach =

- Ortsteil of Schwarzatal
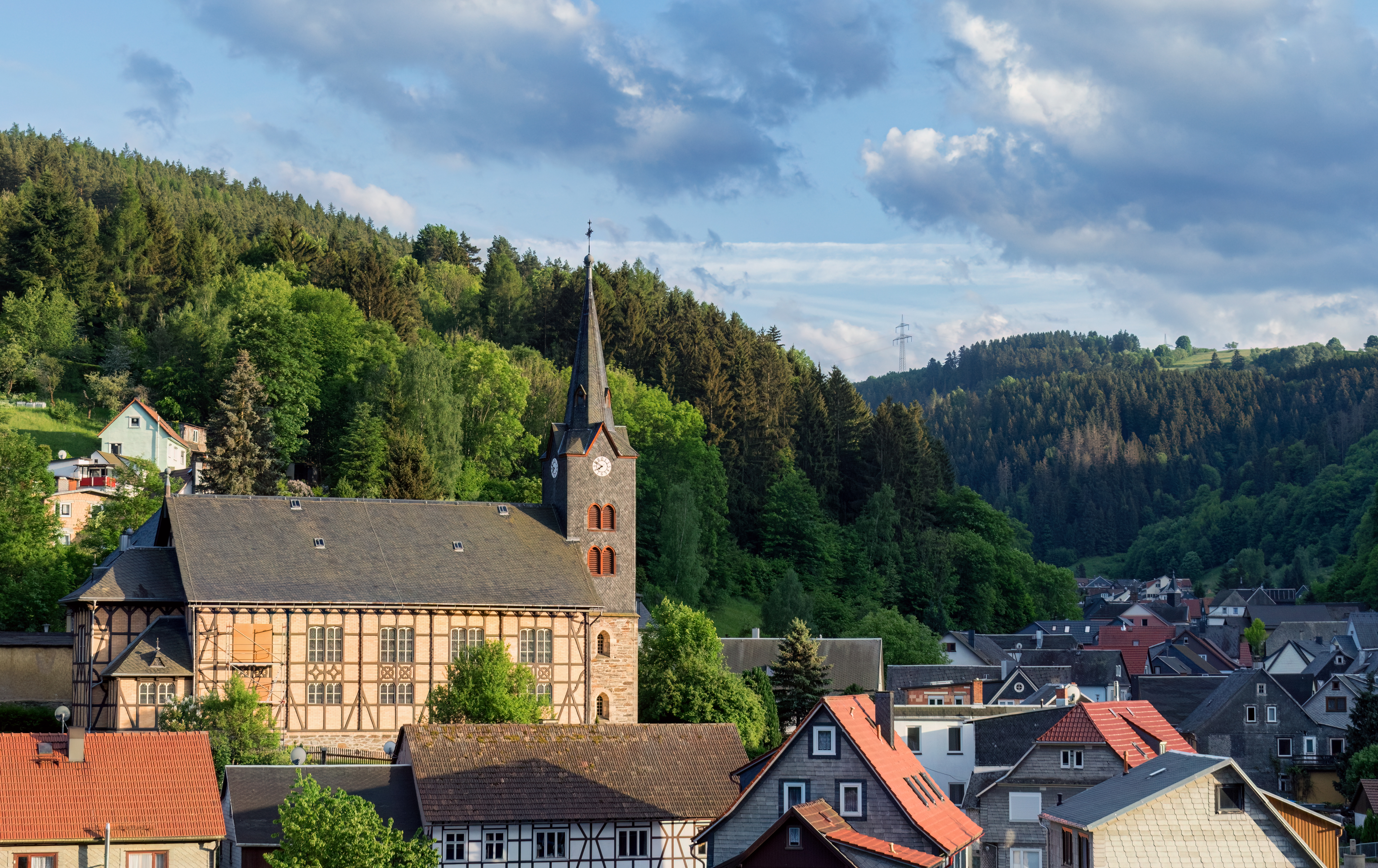

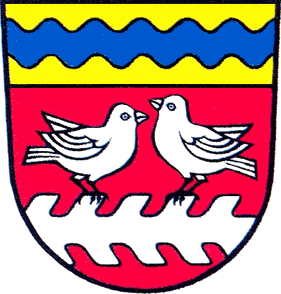
- Coat of arms
- Interactive map of Mellenbach-Glasbach
- Location within Germany Location within Thuringia
- Coordinates: 50°35′41″N 11°7′11″E
- Country: Germany
- State: Thuringia
- District: Saalfeld-Rudolstadt
- Town: Schwarzatal
- Subdivisions: 5

Area
  - Total: 8.82 km^{2} (3.41 sq mi)
- Elevation: 370 m (1,210 ft)

Population (2017-12-31)
  - Total: 930
  - Density: 110/km^{2} (270/sq mi)
- Time zone: UTC+01:00 (CET)
  - Summer (DST): UTC+02:00 (CEST)
- Postal codes: 98746
- Dialling codes: 036705
- Vehicle registration: SLF

Mellenbach-Glasbach (German pronunciation: [ˈmɛlənbax ˈɡlaːsbax]) is a village and a former municipality in the district Saalfeld-Rudolstadt, in Thuringia, Germany. Since 1 January 2019, it is part of the town Schwarzatal.
