= Schwarzatal =

- Town
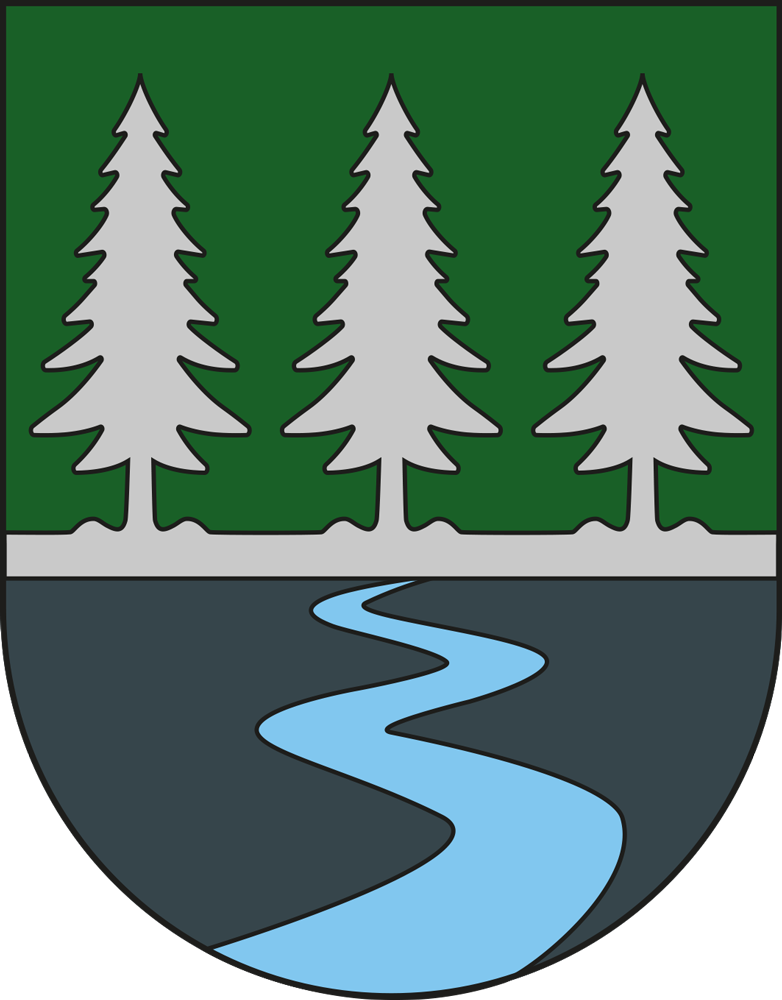
- Coat of arms

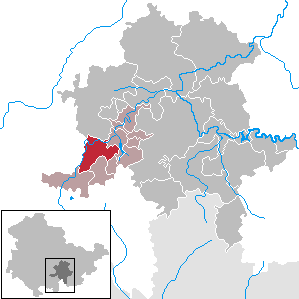
- Location of Schwarzatal within Saalfeld-Rudolstadt district
- Interactive map of Schwarzatal
- Location within Germany Location within Thuringia
- Coordinates: 50°35′N 11°09′E
- Country: Germany
- State: Thuringia
- District: Saalfeld-Rudolstadt
- Municipal assoc.: Schwarzatal
- Subdivisions: 9

Government
  - Mayor (2019–25): Kathrin Kräupner (Ind.)

Area
  - Total: 25.99 km^{2} (10.03 sq mi)
- Elevation: 670 m (2,200 ft)

Population (2025-12-31)
  - Total: 3,319
  - Density: 127.7/km^{2} (330.7/sq mi)
- Time zone: UTC+01:00 (CET)
  - Summer (DST): UTC+02:00 (CEST)
- Postal codes: 98744, 98746
- Dialling codes: 036705
- Vehicle registration: SLF
- Website: https://www.stadt-schwarzatal.com/

Schwarzatal (German pronunciation: [ˈʃvaʁtsaˌtaːl], lit. 'Schwarza Valley') is a town and a municipality in the district Saalfeld-Rudolstadt, in Thuringia, Germany. It was created with effect from 1 January 2019 by the merger of the former municipalities of Mellenbach-Glasbach, Meuselbach-Schwarzmühle and Oberweißbach. The name refers to the river Schwarza.
