= Rüdigsdorf Switzerland =

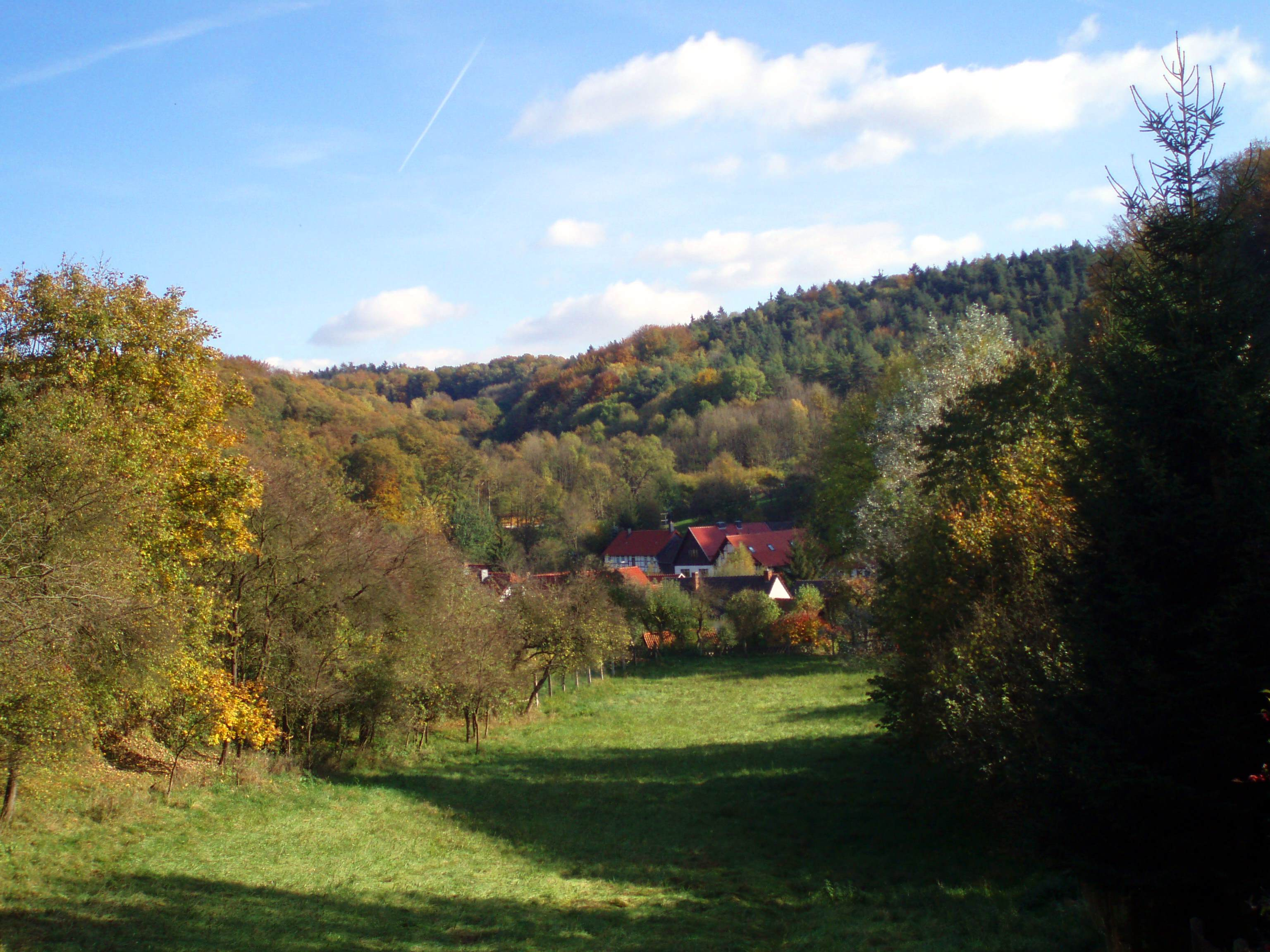
- Rüdigsdorf Switzerland

Highest point
- Peak: Buchholzer Berg
- Elevation: 350.1 m above NN

Geography
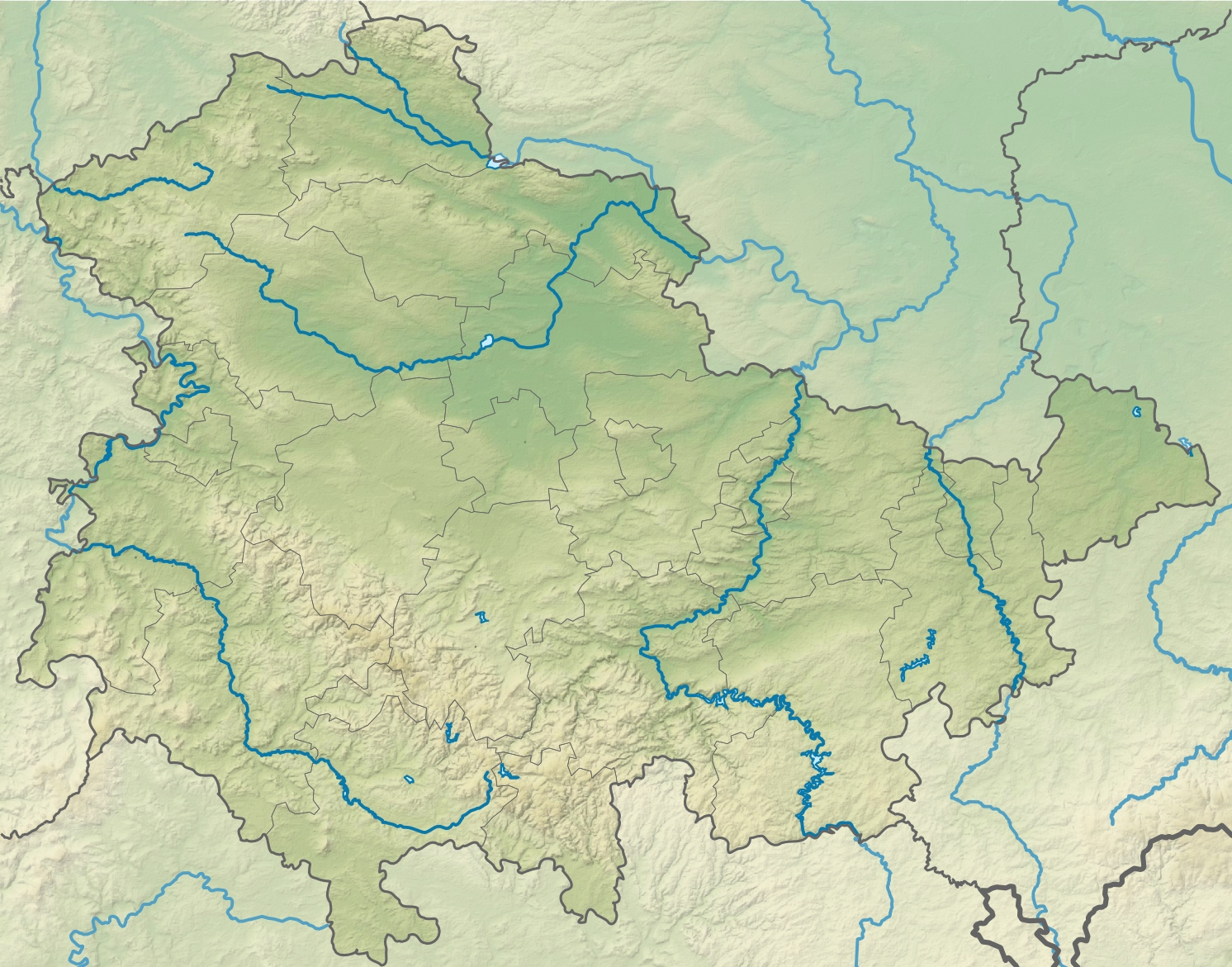
- Location within Thuringia
- Country: Germany
- State: Thuringia
- District: Nordhausen
- Range coordinates: 51°32′20″N 10°49′43″E

Rüdigsdorf Switzerland (German: Rüdigsdorfer Schweiz) is a range of hills up to 350.1 m above sea level (NN) near the village of Rüdigsdorf in the district of Nordhausen in the German state of Thuringia.

The landscape is the last intact gypsum karst region in the state and has therefore been designated by the EU as a protected area. It is one of the smallest "little Switzerlands" in Germany. The majority of the area is a nature reserve.

== Location ==
Rüdigsdorf Switzerland lies in the extreme southern foothills of the Harz Mountains of central Germany between Nordhausen to the southwest, Krimderode to the west, Niedersachswerfen to the northwest, Harzungen and Neustadt to the north, Buchholz to the east and Steigerthal to the southeast. The central villages of the region, which descends gradually towards the west and southwest, are the Rüdigsdorf and Petersdorf. The Zorge, a tributary of the Helme, flows past the hills to the south.

== Hills ==
The highest point in the karst landscape − which is dotted with sinkholes − is the Buchholzer Berg (350.1 m), west of Buchholz.

→ Other hills in the range may be found in the Harz section of the article on "List of mountains and hills of Thuringia"

== History ==
A Landwehr regiment was stationed in Rüdigsdorf Switzerland during the First World War.

During the 20th century around a third of the natural landscape was destroyed by gypsum quarrying. In early 2005, quarrying was due to restart, but was prevented by protest from the local population. Nevertheless, there is still interest in the area from the gypsum industry.

== Hiking ==
Rüdigsdorf Switzerland is crossed by the Karst Trail, a thematic long-distance path which links places of natural interest in the landscape.

At the top of the village of Rüdigsdorf used to be checkpoint no. 100 in the Harzer Wandernadel hiking network. It has since been moved elsewhere.
