= Martinroda =

- Ortsteil of Vacha
- Interactive map of Martinroda
- Location within Germany Location within Thuringia
- Coordinates: 50°48′N 10°04′E
- Country: Germany
- State: Thuringia
- District: Wartburgkreis
- Town: Vacha

Area
  - Total: 6.3 km^{2} (2.4 sq mi)
- Elevation: 380 m (1,250 ft)

Population (2012-12-31)
  - Total: 273
  - Density: 43/km^{2} (110/sq mi)
- Time zone: UTC+01:00 (CET)
  - Summer (DST): UTC+02:00 (CEST)
- Postal codes: 36404
- Dialling codes: 036963

Martinroda (German pronunciation: [maʁtiːnˈʁoːda]) is a village and a former municipality in the Wartburgkreis district of Thuringia, Germany. Since 31 December 2013, it is part of the town Vacha.
