= Fineberg =

Fineberg is a surname. Notable people with the surname include:

- Harvey V. Fineberg (born 1945), American physician
- Joseph Fineberg (1886–1957), Polish translator
- Joshua Fineberg (born 1969), American composer
- Larry Fineberg (born 1945), Canadian playwright
- Richard A. Fineberg, American investigative journalist
