= Meuselbach-Schwarzmühle =

- Ortsteil of Schwarzatal
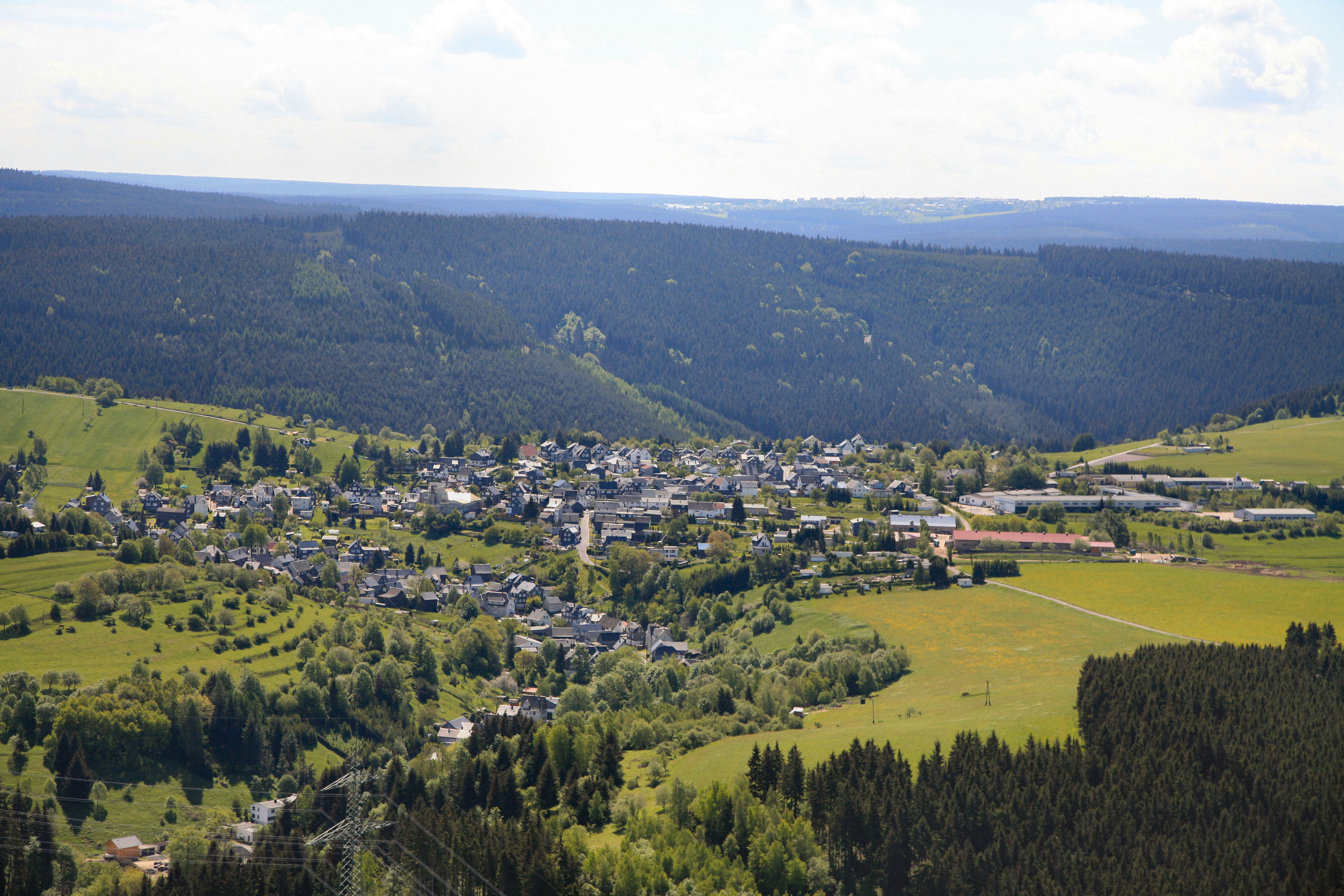

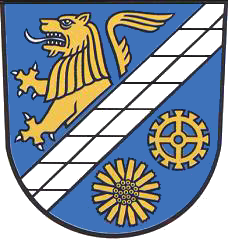
- Coat of arms
- Interactive map of Meuselbach-Schwarzmühle
- Location within Germany Location within Thuringia
- Coordinates: 50°34′12″N 11°5′22″E
- Country: Germany
- State: Thuringia
- District: Saalfeld-Rudolstadt
- Town: Schwarzatal
- Subdivisions: 2

Area
  - Total: 7.52 km^{2} (2.90 sq mi)
- Elevation: 560 m (1,840 ft)

Population (2017-12-31)
  - Total: 1,064
  - Density: 141/km^{2} (366/sq mi)
- Time zone: UTC+01:00 (CET)
  - Summer (DST): UTC+02:00 (CEST)
- Postal codes: 98746
- Dialling codes: 036705
- Website: www.meuselbach.de

Meuselbach-Schwarzmühle (German pronunciation: [ˈmɔʏzl̩ˌbax ˈʃvaʁtsˌmyːlə]) is a village and a former municipality in the district Saalfeld-Rudolstadt, in Thuringia, Germany. Since 1 January 2019, it is part of the town Schwarzatal.
