= Wöllmisse =

Highest point
- Elevation: 405 m (1,329 ft)
- Prominence: 113 m (371 ft)
- Isolation: 9.5 km (5.9 mi)
- Coordinates: 50°54′37″N 11°40′17″E

Geography
- Location: Jena, Thuringia, Germany

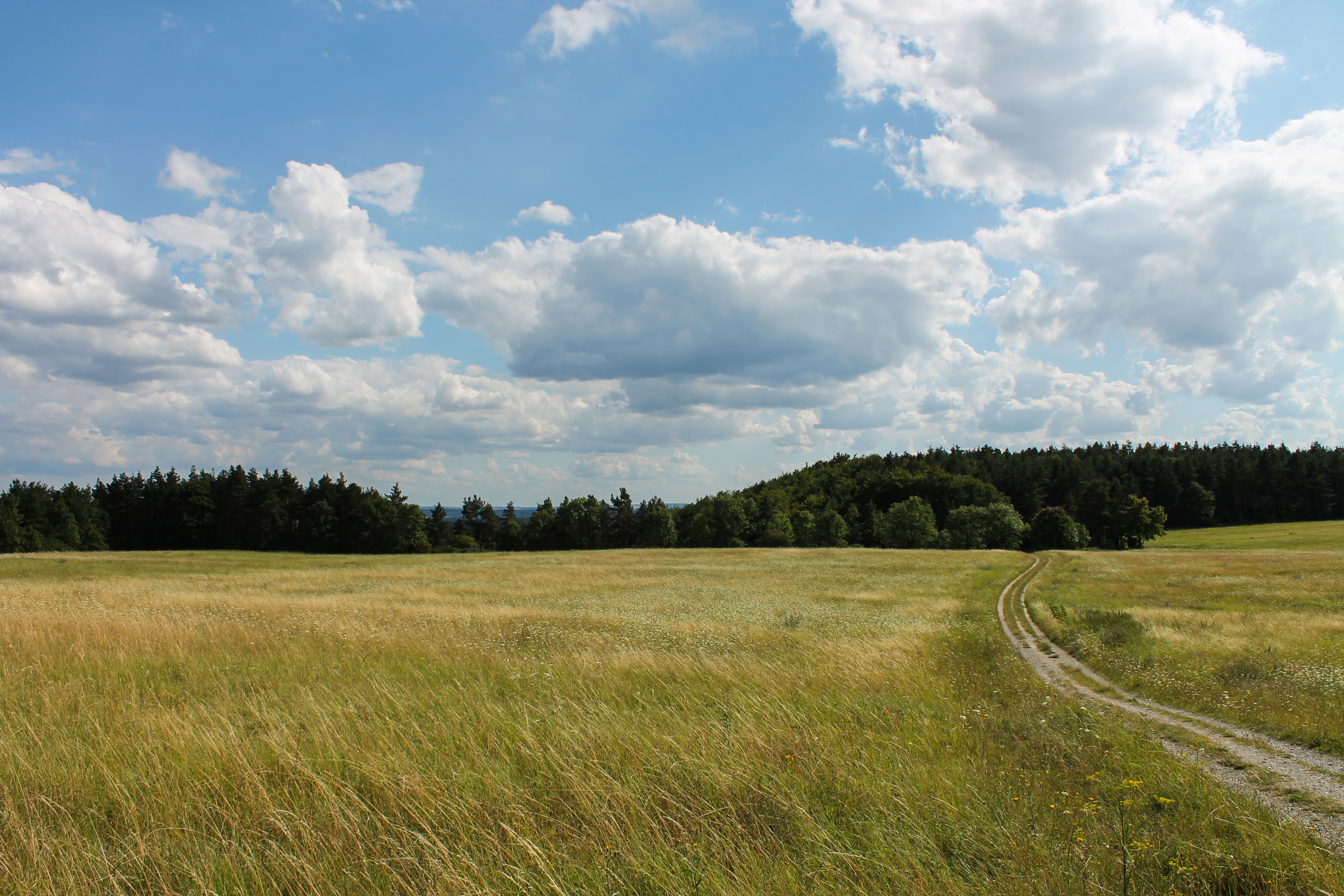
The Wöllmisse near Jena-Lobeda, close to a well-known large-leaved linden

The Wöllmisse is a high plateau which rises east of the Saale Valley in the State of Thuringia, Germany. The densely wooded Wöllmisse borders the Roda Valley in the South, the Saale Valley to the West, the Gembdenbachtal in the North, and the town of Bürgel and the Gleistal Valley in the East. In Bürgel, it is connected via a saddle with the formation of Jenzig-Hufeisen-Alte Gleisberg.

Municipalities and districts that are within the Wöllmisse are (beginning in the North): Großlöbichau in the District of Kleinlöbichau; the Bürgel villages of Rodigast and Lucka; Schöngleina with Zinna; Schlöben with the towns of Mennewitz, Zöttnitz, Rabis, Fraitsch and Burgrabis; the Jena districts of Ilmnitz, Drackendorf, Lobeda, Wöllnitz, Ziegenhain, Camsdorf, Wenigen-Jena, Jenaprießnitz and Wogau. Also, the villages of Trockhausen, Gröben, and Podelsatz are considered a part of the Wöllmisse, all at the southern foot of the ridge.

== Mountains ==
The Kernberge, seen from Jena-Winzerla

In addition to the closed high plateau of the Wöllmisse, there are several mountains. The largest are the Kernberg and the Johannisberg to the West. They rise approximately 250 m above the Saale Valley.

== History ==
In the southwest of the Wöllmisse is the ruin the first mentioned Castle at Jena, the Lobdeburg built in 1166.

During the Middle Ages the Wölmisse was almost completely clearcut and on its slopes vineyards operated. Since the last century it has been replanted once again. Today the Wöllmisse is an important recreational area for Jena.
