= Spitzer Berg (Thuringian Highland) =

Mountain in Thuringia, Germany

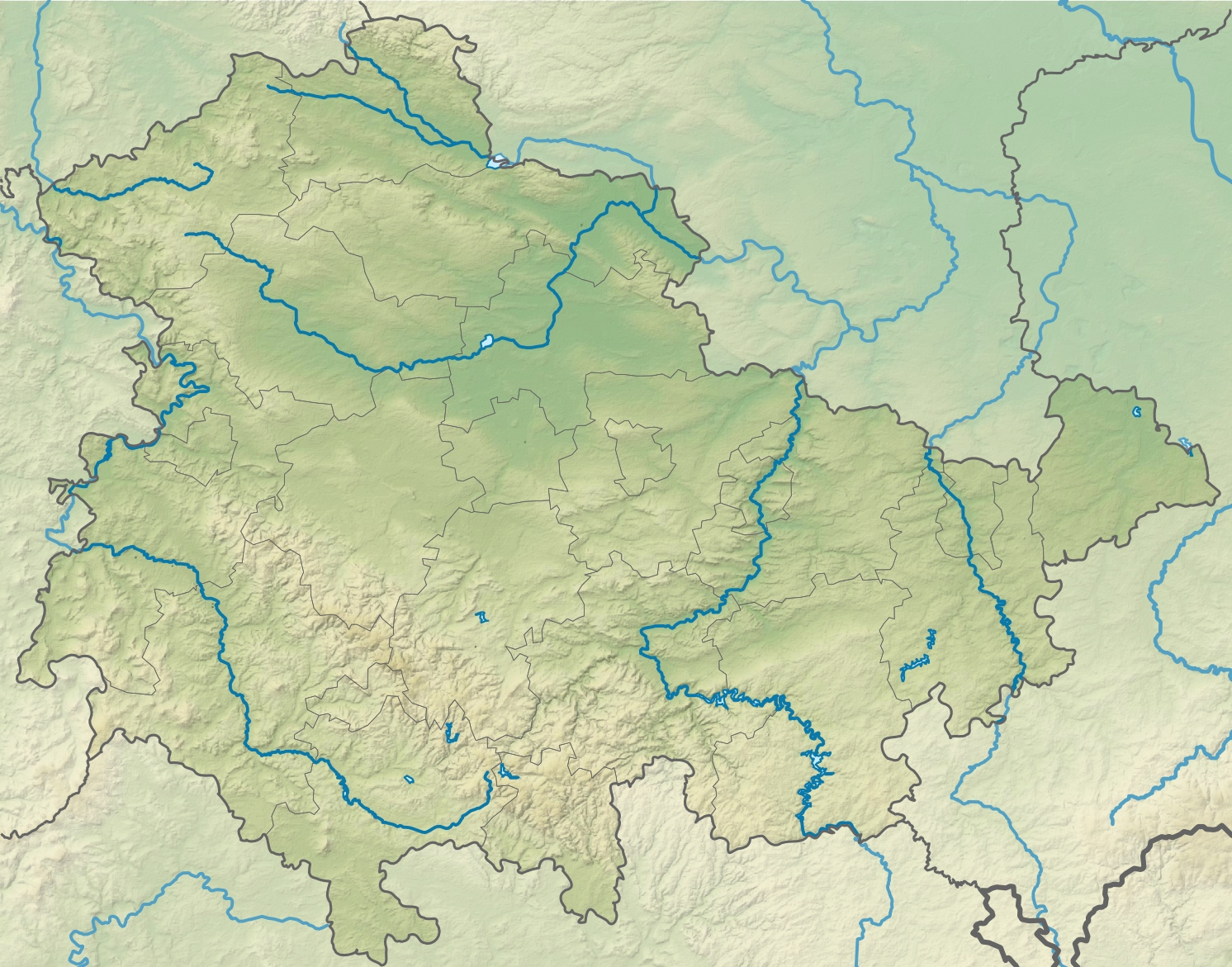
- Location within Thuringia

Highest point
- Elevation: 790.3 m (2,593 ft)
- Coordinates: 50°33′10″N 11°11′20″E

Geography
- Location: Thuringia, Germany
- Parent range: Thuringian Forest

The Spitzer Berg is a 790.3 m high (above sea level) mountain located in the Thuringian Highland, Thuringia (Germany).

It is located close to the municipality of Lichte and the Leibis-Lichte Dam in the Saalfeld-Rudolstadt district in the Thuringian Forest Nature Park within walking distance of the Rennsteig.

Neighbouring mountains
Description	Height above sea level	Direction	Particularity
Rehhecke	707.0 m	NW	Coniferous forest
Mühlberg	609.0 m	N	Coniferous forest
Assberg	703.0 m	N	
Rauhhügel	801.9 m	E	Observation tower, radio mast
Mutzenberg	770.0 m	S	Coniferous forest

== See also ==
- List of Mountains and Elevations of Thuringia
