= Mutzenberg =

Mountain in Thuringian Highland, Germany

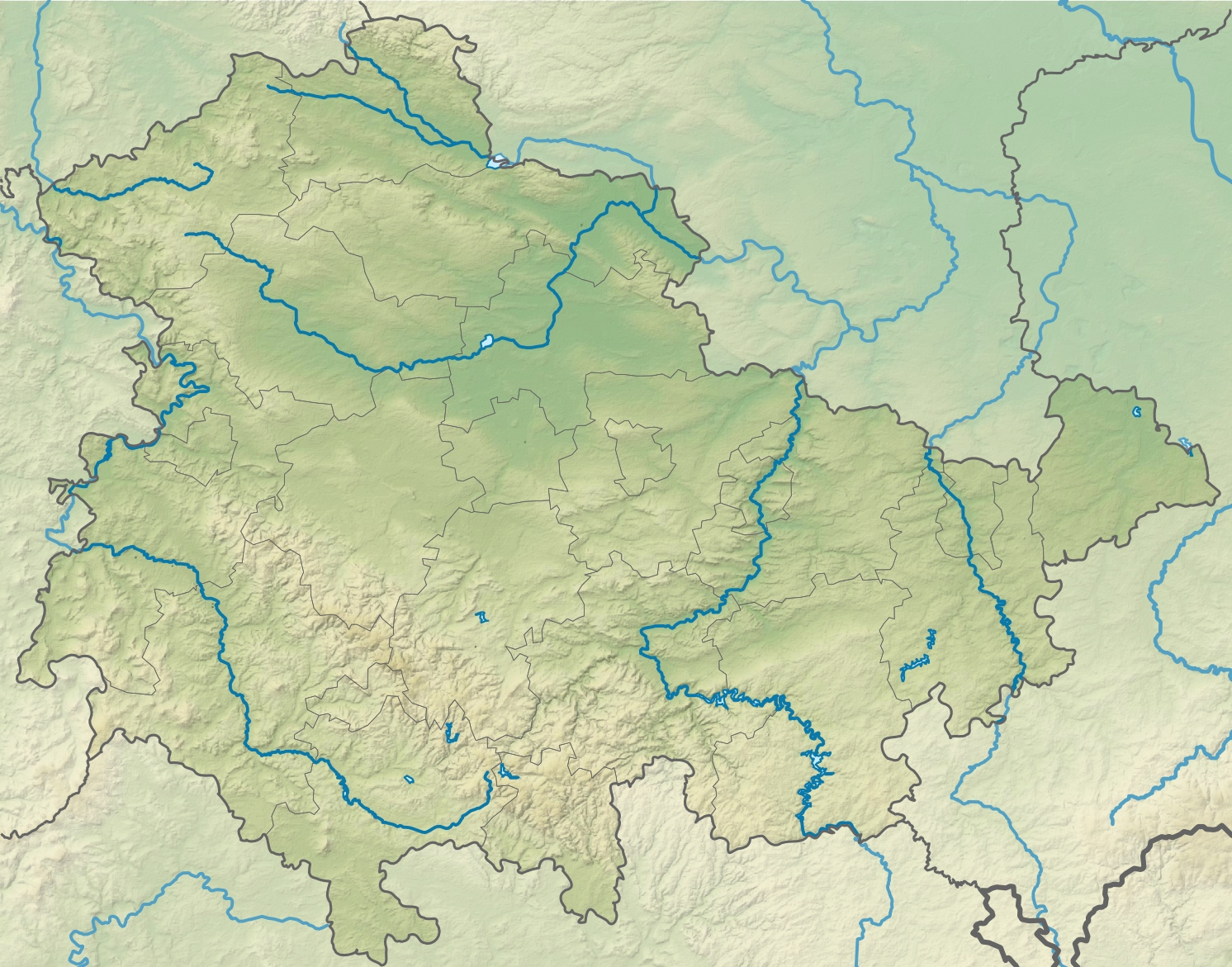
- Location within Thuringia

Highest point
- Elevation: 770.0 m (2,526.2 ft)
- Coordinates: 50°32′25″N 11°12′01″E

Geography
- Location: Thuringia, Germany
- Parent range: Thuringian Forest

The Mutzenberg is a 770.0 m high (above sea level) mountain located in the Thuringian Highland, Thuringia (Germany). The German mountain, Mutzenberg, translates to "Mountain Hat”.

It is to be found close to the municipality of Lichte, and the Leibis-Lichte Dam in the Saalfeld-Rudolstadt district in the Thuringian Forest Nature Park. The section of the Rennsteig walkway between Neuhaus am Rennweg, Piesau, and Spechtsbrunn runs close to the mountain.

Neighbouring mountains
Description	Height above sea level	Direction	Particularity
Spitzer Berg	790.3 m	NW	Coniferous forest
Rehhecke	707.0 m	N NW	Coniferous forest
Assberg	703.0 m	NE	
Rauhhügel	801.9 m	E NE	Observation tower, radio mast
Mittelberg	803.6 m	S SW	Coniferous forest
Hahnberg	685.3 m	SW	Pastureland

== See also ==
- List of Mountains and Elevations of Thuringia
