= Oberland am Rennsteig =

- Municipality
- Interactive map of Oberland am Rennsteig
- Location within Germany Location within Thuringia
- Coordinates: 50°27′N 11°12′E
- Country: Germany
- State: Thuringia
- District: Sonneberg
- Disbanded: 2013

Area
  - Total: 39.27 km^{2} (15.16 sq mi)
- Elevation: 580 m (1,900 ft)

Population (2012-12-31)
  - Total: 2,200
  - Density: 56/km^{2} (150/sq mi)
- Time zone: UTC+01:00 (CET)
  - Summer (DST): UTC+02:00 (CEST)
- Postal codes: 96523, 96515
- Dialling codes: 03675, 036762
- Vehicle registration: SON

Oberland am Rennsteig (German pronunciation: [ˈoːbɐlant ʔam ˈʁɛnʃtaɪk], lit. 'Highlands on the Rennsteig') is a former municipality in the Sonneberg district of Thuringia, Germany. Since 31 December 2013, it is part of the town Sonneberg.
