= Rauhhügel =

Mountain in Germany

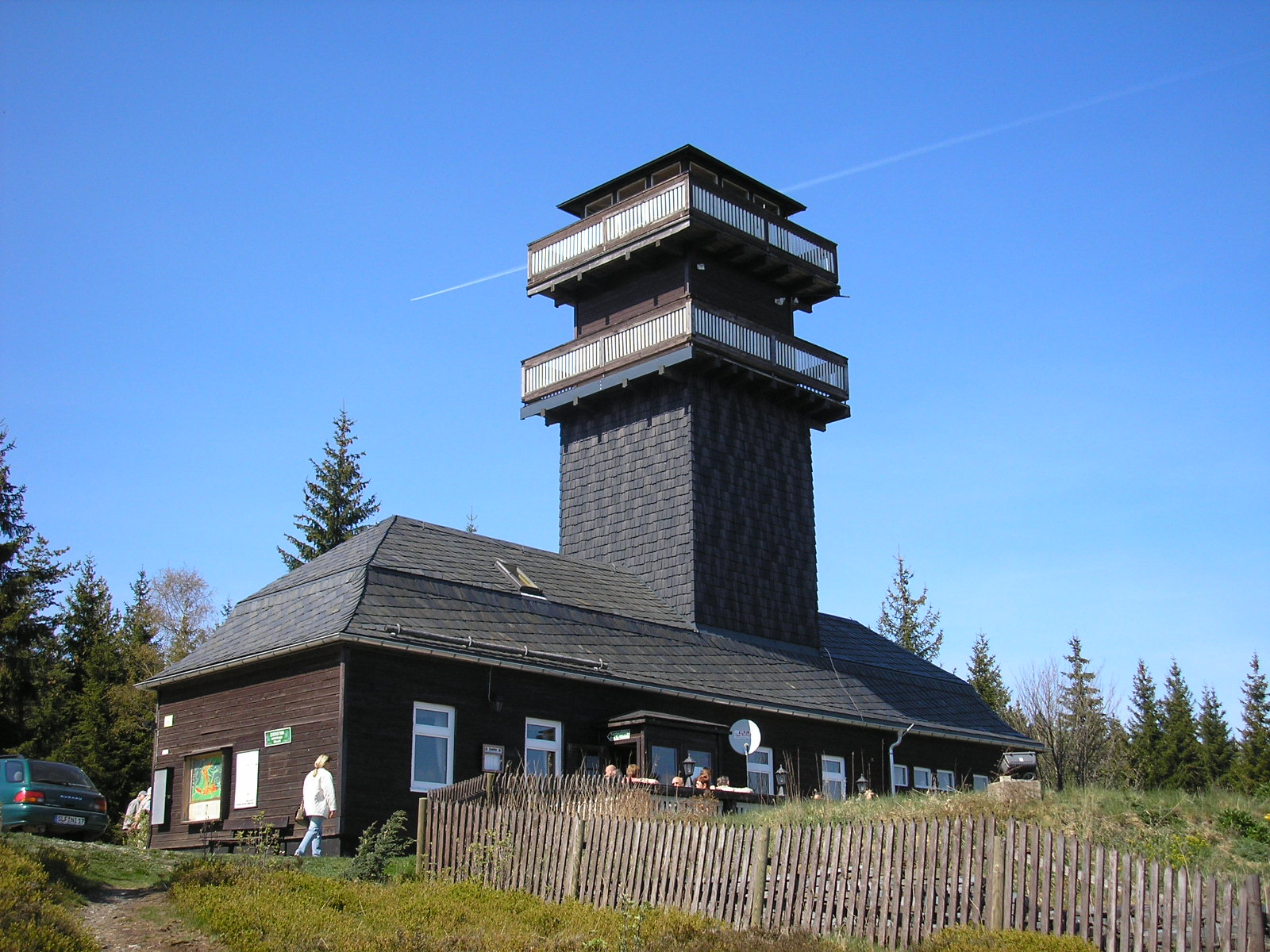
- Leipzig tower on top of the Rauhhügel

Highest point
- Elevation: 801.9 m (2,631 ft)
- Prominence: 141 m (463 ft)
- Coordinates: 50°32′36″N 11°13′2″E

Geography
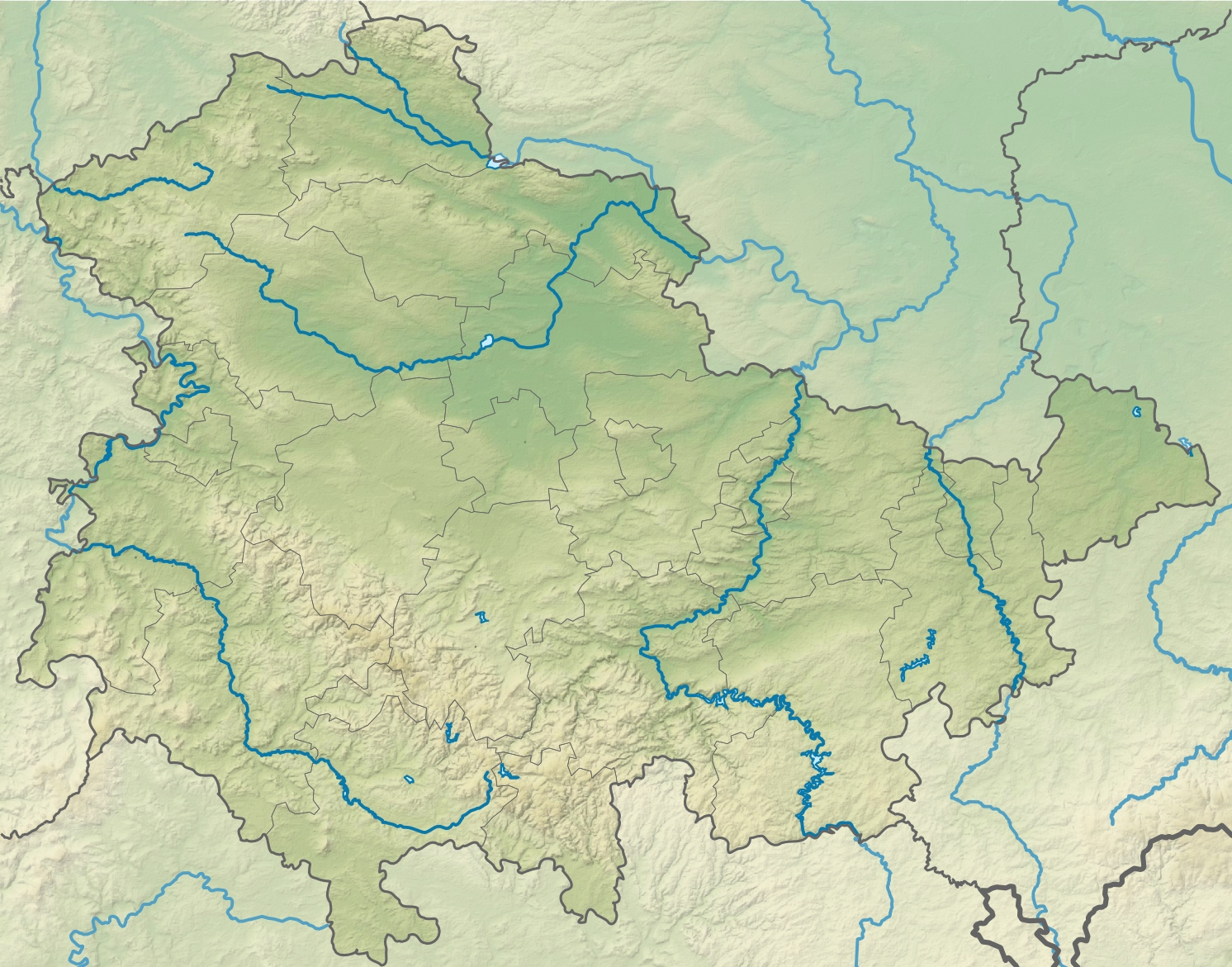
- Location within Thuringia
- Location: Thuringia, Germany
- Parent range: Thuringian Forest

The Rauhhügel is an 812.9 m high (above sea level) mountain located in the Thuringian Highland, Thuringia, Germany.

It is located close to the municipalities of Schmiedefeld and Lichte and the Leibis-Lichte Dam in the Saalfeld-Rudolstadt district in the Thuringian Forest Nature Park within walking distance of the Rennsteig.

Neighbouring mountains
Description	Height above sea level	Direction	Particularity
Mutzenberg	770.0 m	SW	Coniferous forest
Spitzer Berg	790.3 m	W NW	Coniferous forest
Rehhecke	707.0 m	NW	Coniferous forest
Assberg	703.0 m	N NE	

The Leipzig tower on top of the Rauhhügel is 17.5 m high. It has viewing platforms on two levels, the upper at 14 m, from which in good weather one can see far into the surrounding mountains of the Thuringian Highland, the Thuringian Forest and to mountains of the Fichtel Mountains and Ore Mountains, including:

- Neuhaus am Rennweg (830 m)
- Ochsenkopf (1,024 m), Fichtel Mountains
- Schneekopf (1,051 m), Fichtel Mountains
- Fichtelberg (1,214 m), Ore Mountains

There is a guesthouse at the base of the tower.

== See also ==
- List of mountains and hills of Thuringia
