= Thuringian Forest Nature Park =

Nature park in Thuringia, Germany

- Naturpark Thüringer Wald
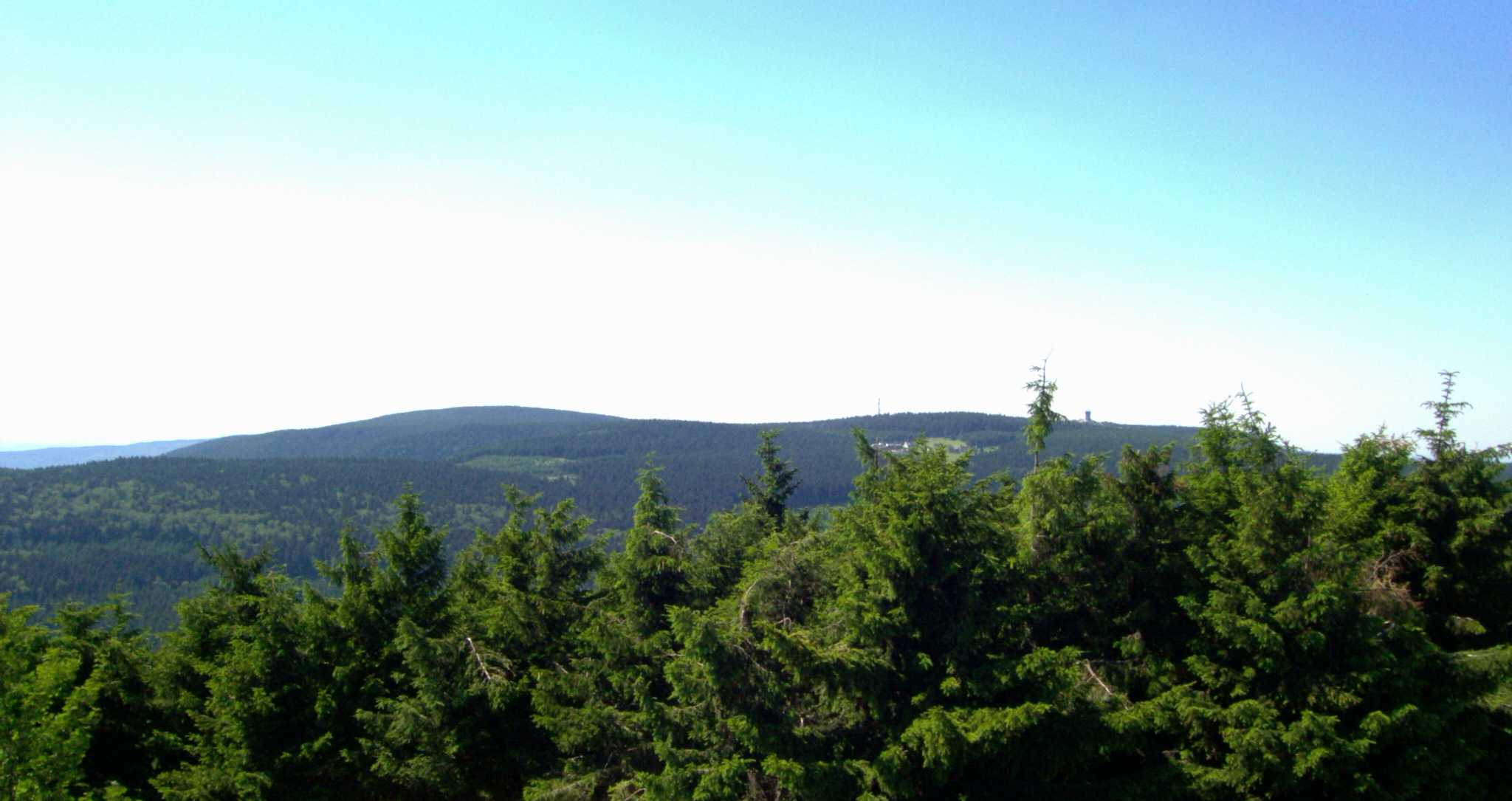
- View from Grosser Finsterberg to Beerberg and Schneekopf (The three highest mountains of Thuringia)

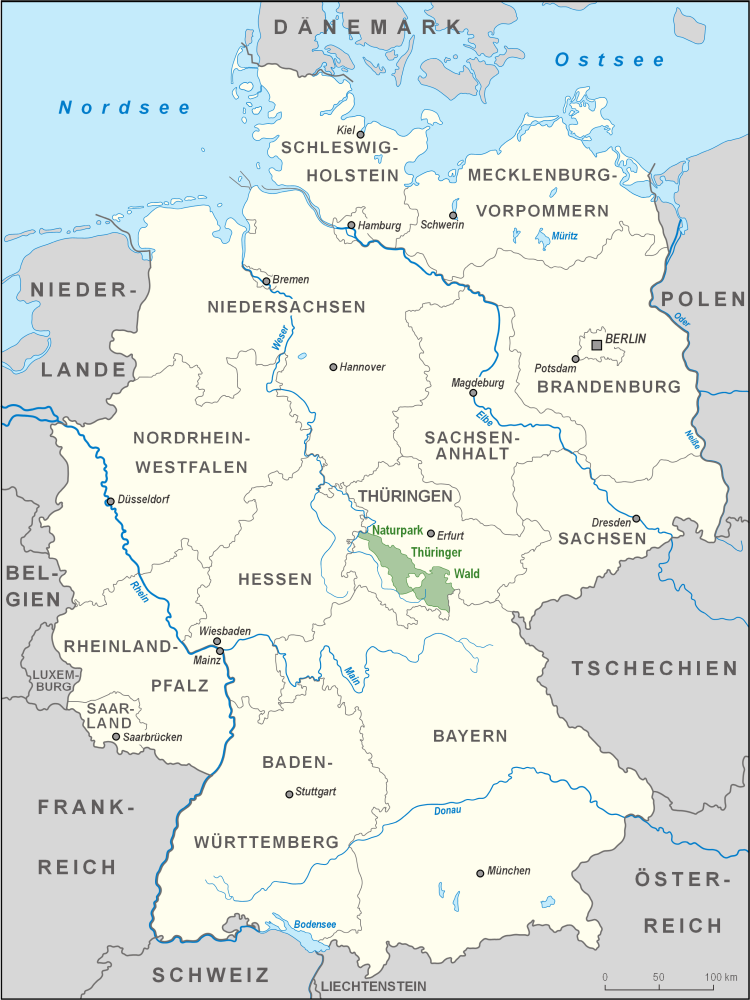
- Location of the Thuringian Forest Nature Park
- Location: Thuringia, Germany
- Coordinates: 50°31′N 10°59′E
- Area: 2,200 km^{2} (850 sq mi)
- Established: 1990
- Website: www.naturpark-thueringer-wald.eu

Thuringian Forest Nature Park (German: Naturpark Thüringer Wald) is one of two nature parks in the state of Thuringia, Germany.

Founded in 1990, and expanded in 2018, the nature park now covers and area of more than 2,200 km^{2} (850 sq mi). It extends around the Rennsteig and comprises almost the entire Thuringian Forest and the Thuringian Highlands with Eisenach in northwest and Sonneberg in the south. The nature park protection includes the 337 km^{2} (130 sq mi) biosphere reservation, and a number of dams such as Tambach-Dietharz Dam, Schmalwasser Dam, Ohra Dam, Lütsche Dam and the Leibis-Lichte Dam.

The highest mountains in the park are the Großer Beerberg (982 m above sea level (NN)) and the Schneekopf (978 m above sea level (NN)).

== Biosphere Reserve ==
The nature park is an expansion of an older protection; the "UNESCO Biosphere Reserve Thuringian Forest" established in 1979 as the first UNESCO biosphere reserve in Germany. The biosphere protection is located in the Thuringian-Franconian low mountains, and after expansions in 1990 and 2018 it now covers an area of 337 km².

== See also ==
- List of nature parks in Germany
- List of mountain and hill ranges in Germany
