= Gräfenthal =

- Town
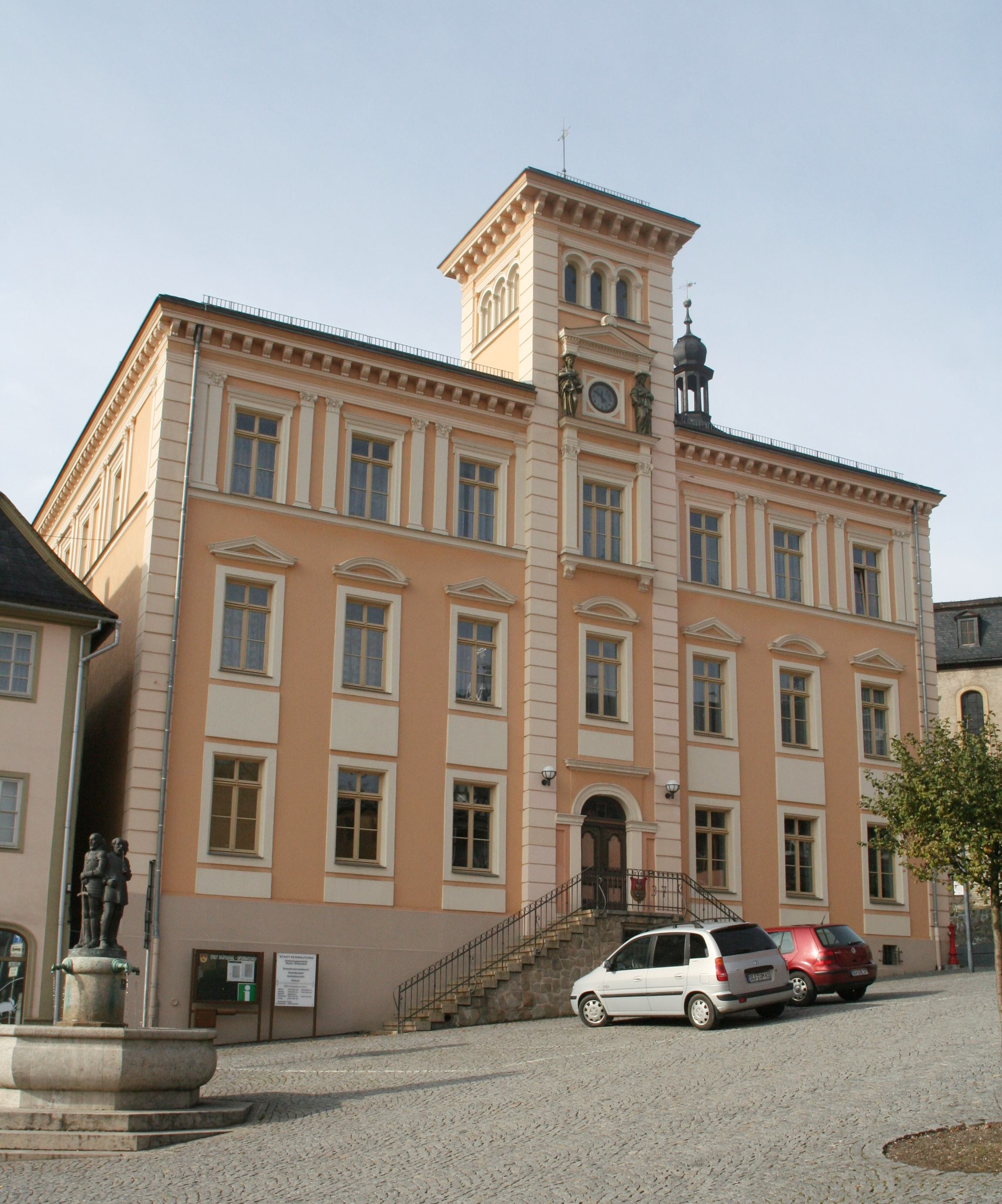
- Town hall

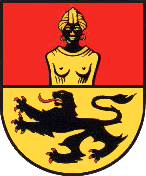
- Coat of arms

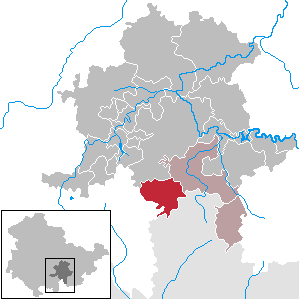
- Location of Gräfenthal within Saalfeld-Rudolstadt district
- Interactive map of Gräfenthal
- Location within Germany Location within Thuringia
- Coordinates: 50°32′N 11°18′E
- Country: Germany
- State: Thuringia
- District: Saalfeld-Rudolstadt
- Municipal assoc.: Schiefergebirge
- Subdivisions: 8

Government
  - Mayor (2024–30): Marcel Kuhnen

Area
  - Total: 36.42 km^{2} (14.06 sq mi)
- Elevation: 400 m (1,300 ft)

Population (2025-12-31)
  - Total: 1,806
  - Density: 49.59/km^{2} (128.4/sq mi)
- Time zone: UTC+01:00 (CET)
  - Summer (DST): UTC+02:00 (CEST)
- Postal codes: 98743
- Dialling codes: 036703
- Vehicle registration: SLF
- Website: www.graefenthal.de

Gräfenthal (German pronunciation: [ˈɡʁɛːfn̩ˌtaːl]) is a town in the district of Saalfeld-Rudolstadt in Thuringia, Germany.

== Geography ==
Gräfenthal is located in the southern Thuringian Highland. Mountains in this region rise up to 800 meters above sea level and are usually wooded with spruce trees. 20 km north-eastern of Gräfenthal lies district town Saalfeld.

Neighboring municipalities (clockwise, starting northwards) are: Reichmannsdorf, Probstzella, Ludwigsstadt, Tettau, Oberland am Rennsteig, Piesau, Lichte, Schmiedefeld

Gräfenthal has 8 subdivisions:

- Buchbach
- Creunitz
- Gebersdorf
- Gräfenthal
- Großneundorf
- Lichtenhain
- Lippelsdorf
- Sommersdorf

== History ==
In 1288 the town was first mentioned. It was for much of its early history under various Ernestine princelings.

== Number of inhabitants ==
- 1994: 3.146
- 1997: 3.036
- 2000: 2.913
- 2003: 2.808
- 2006: 2.692
- 2009: 2.499
- 2012: 2.150
- 2014: 2.056

== Pictures ==
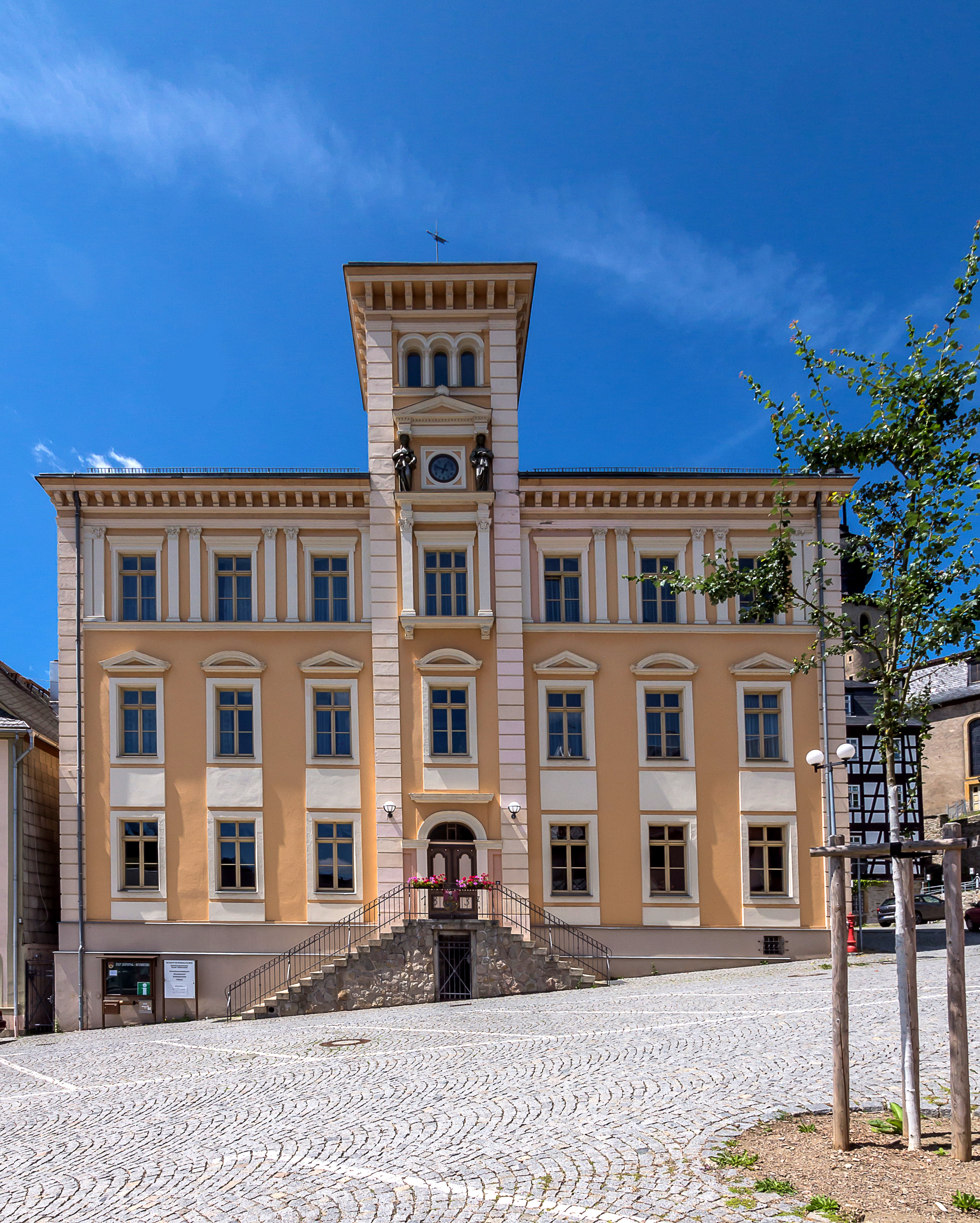
Gräfenthal Market place Town hall

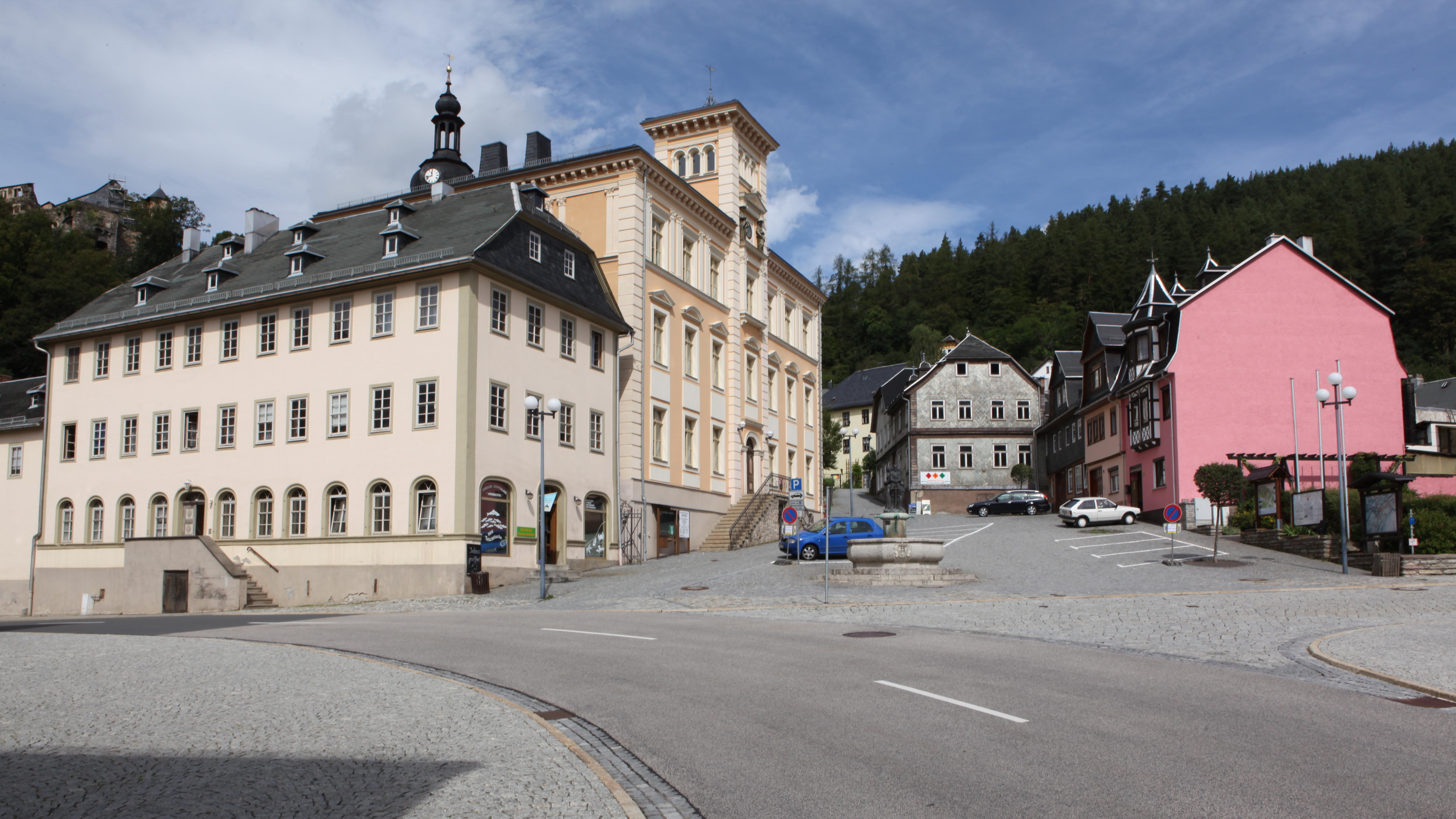
Gräfenthal-Market place

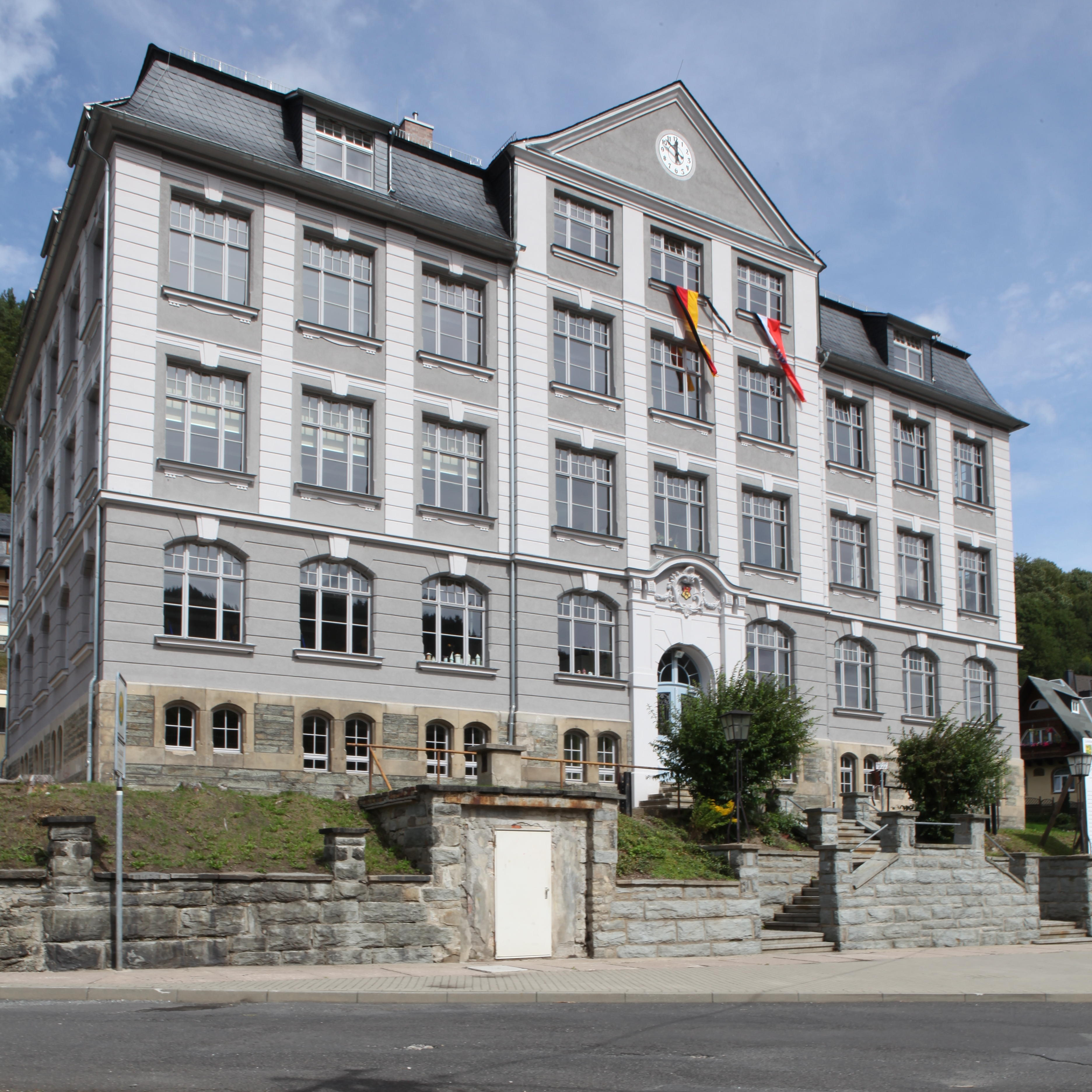
Gräfenthal-School

== Buildings ==
- Castle Wespenstein
- Grenz- und Heimatmuseum Gräfenthal
- Town church, with restored Art Nouveau mural paintings.
- Railway viaduct

== Economy and infrastructure ==
Erstwhile mining and the location at the route for commerce between Nuremberg and Leipzig were important economical factors. Mainly iron, slate and alum had been mined. During the 20th century Gräfenthal was well known for its porcelain products. From the formerly three manufactories only one is still in existence. Today a plastics factory is the main employer.

Gräfenthal lies on the road between Neuhaus am Rennweg and Probstzella. Further roads lead to surrounding municipalities. The town used to be connected to the railway-system up until the line section between Sonneberg and Probstzella became disused due to lacking profitability.

== Sons and daughters of the town ==
- Reinhard Höhn (1904-2000), state and administrative lawyer in the period of National Socialism
- Helmut Lipfert (1916-1990), Luftwaffe officer in World War II
- Christian Paschold (born 1949), sculptor, artist
