= Lichte (disambiguation) =

Lichte is a municipality in Thuringia, Germany.

Lichte may also refer to:

- Lichte (river), of Thuringia, Germany
- Lichte Porzellan, a German porcelain manufacturer
- Lichte (Thuringia) station, a former Deutsche Reichsbahn station in Lichte
- Lichte (Thuringia) east station, a former Deutsche Reichsbahn station east of Lichte

== People with that name ==
- Arthur Lichte (born 1949) is a former general in the United States Air Force

== See also ==
Lichte Trough, an undersea trough named for Heinrich Lichte
