= Cultural monuments in Lichte =

Coordinates: 50°31′30″N 11°11′36″E

This is a list of the cultural monuments in Lichte containing all cultural monuments of the Thuringian municipality of Lichte / Lichtetal am Rennsteig (district of Saalfeld-Rudolstadt), including its sections (Bock-und-Teich, Geiersthal, Lichte and Wallendorf) as of December 2, 2009.

== Single monuments in Lichte ==
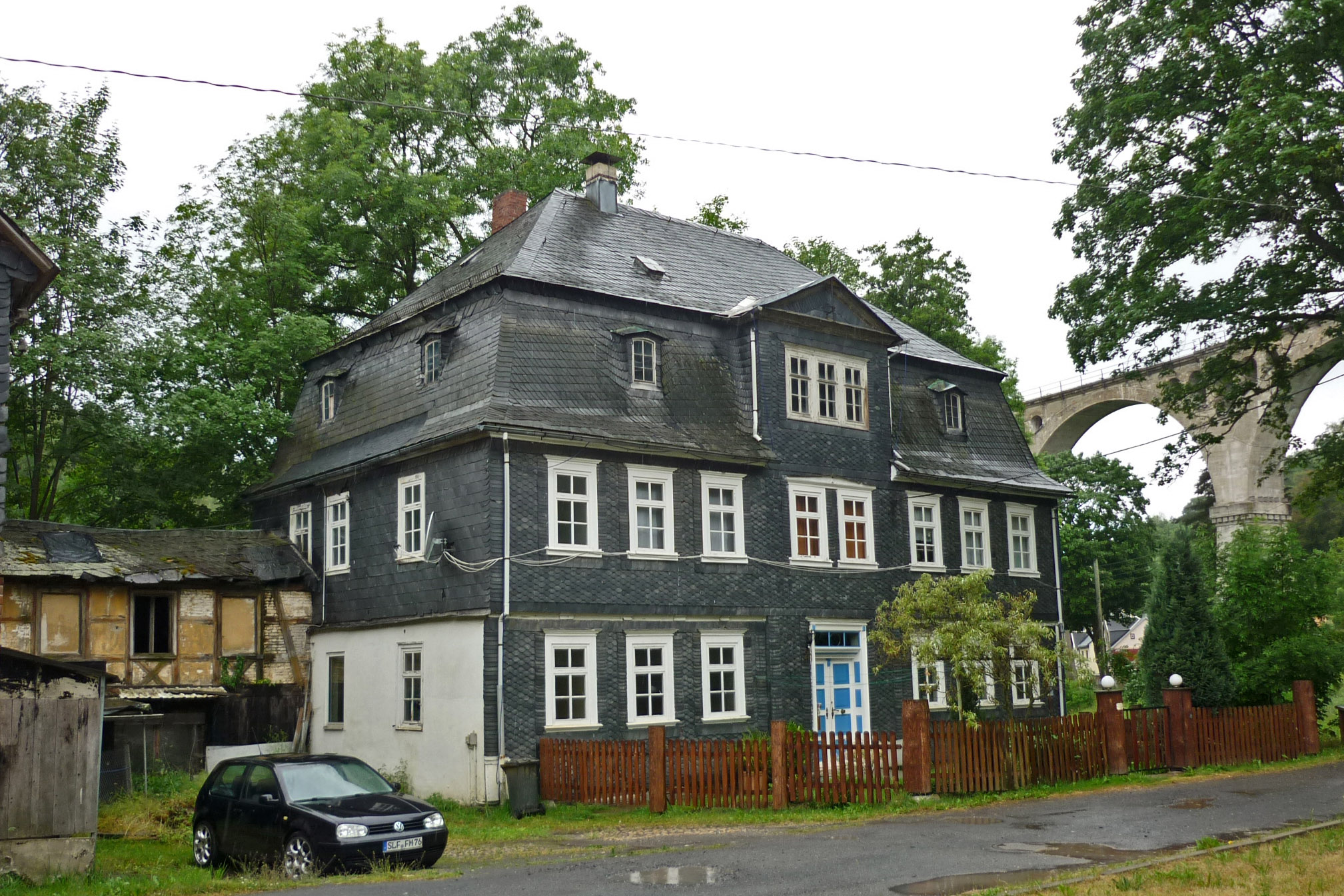
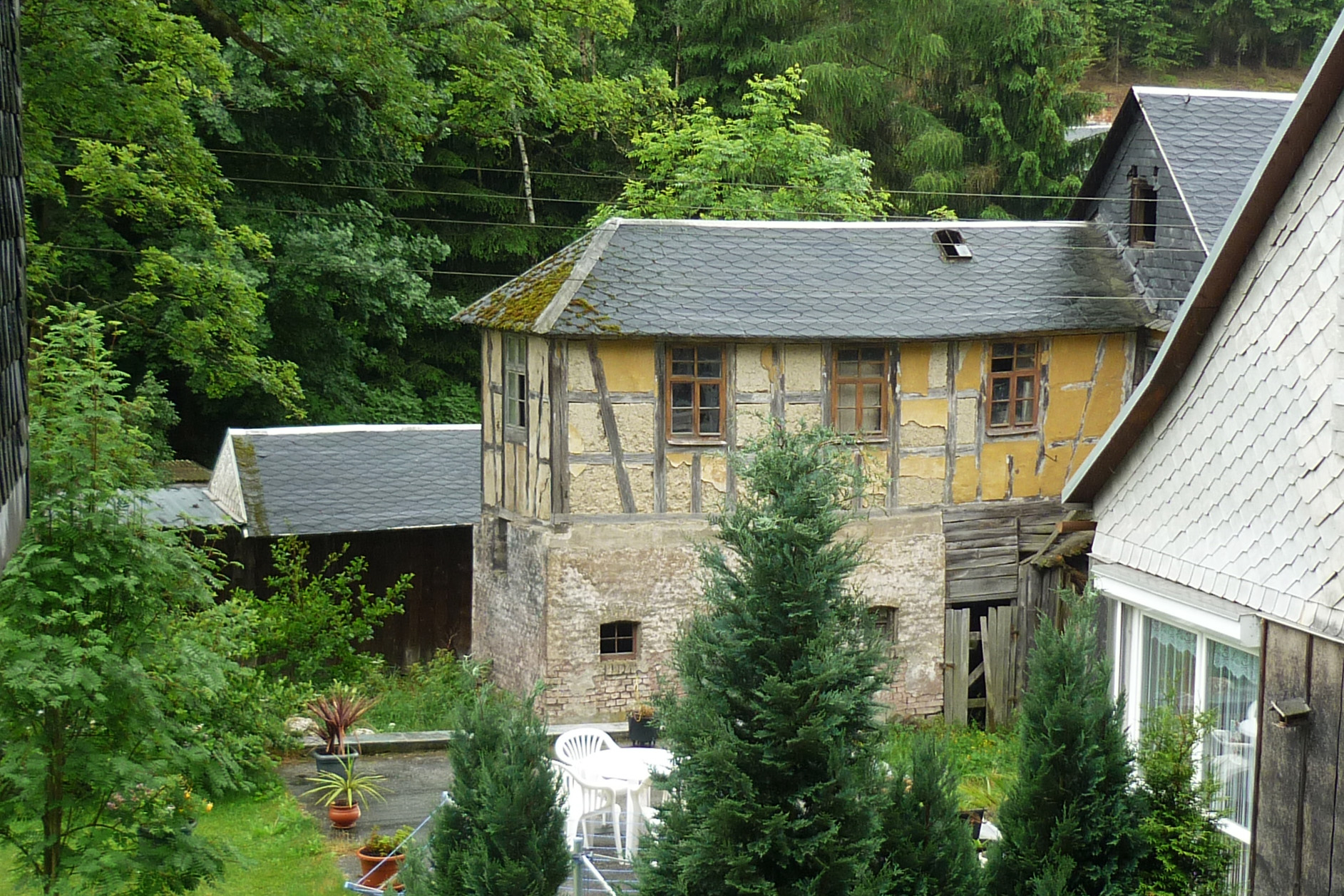
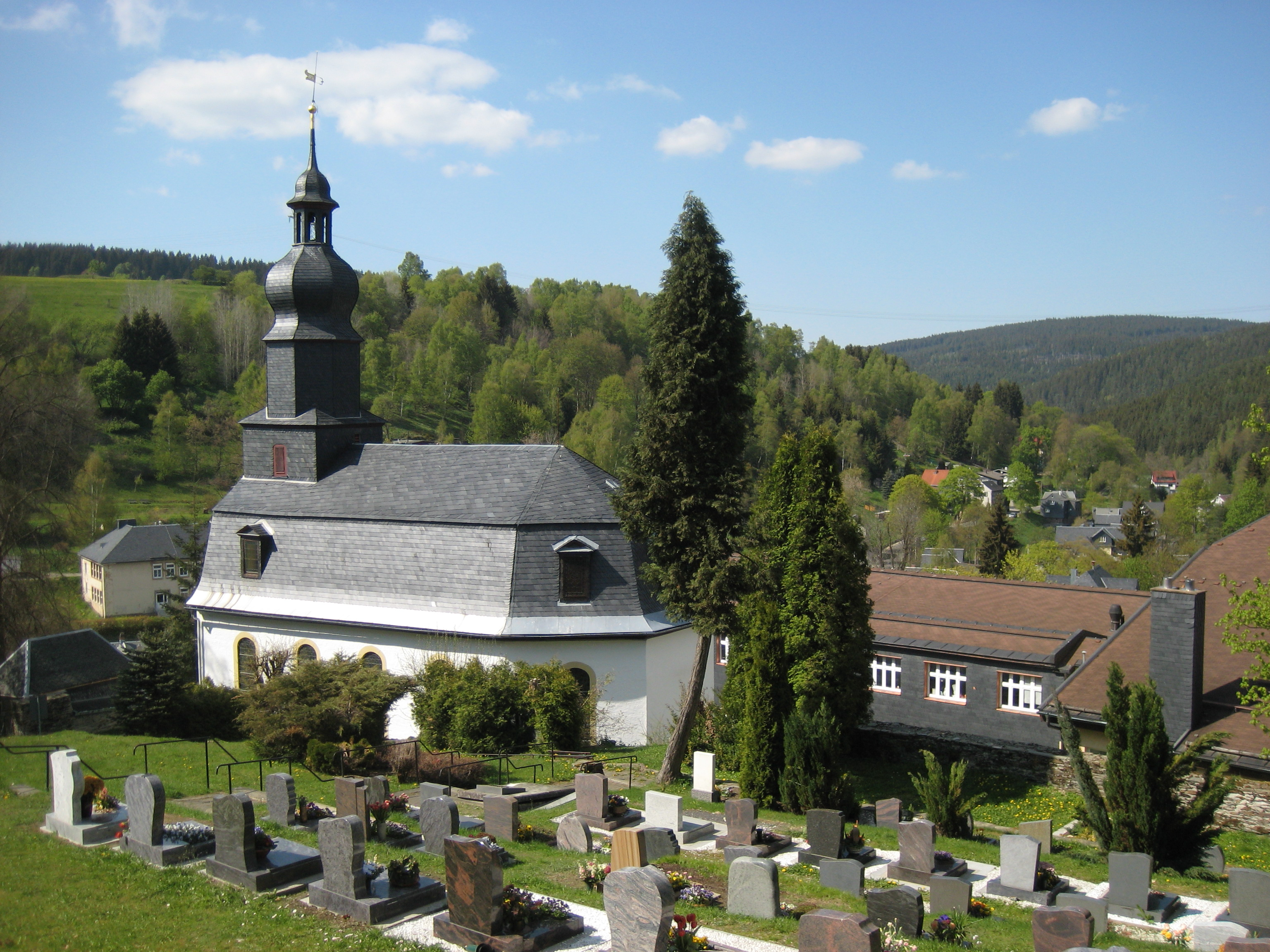
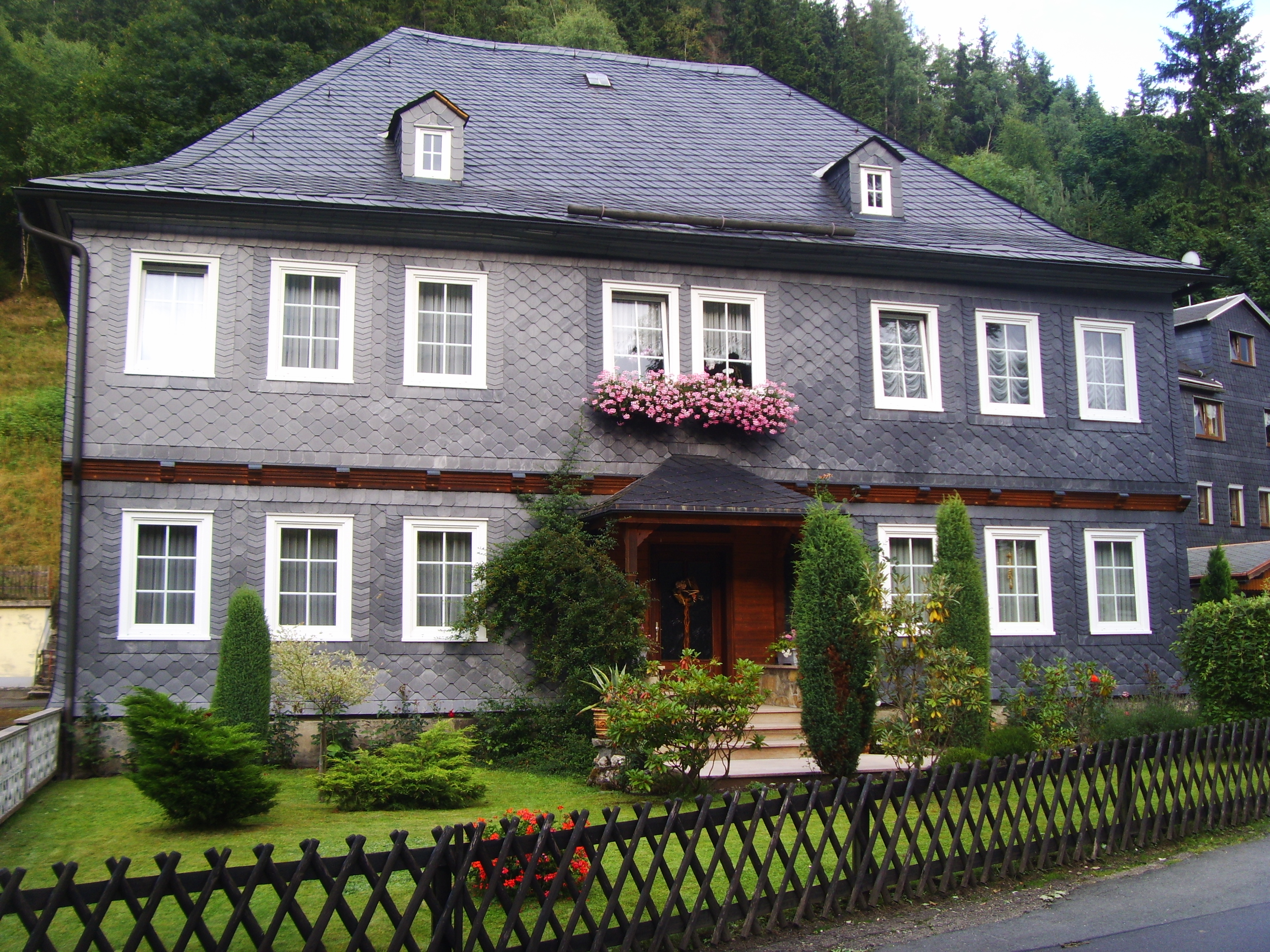
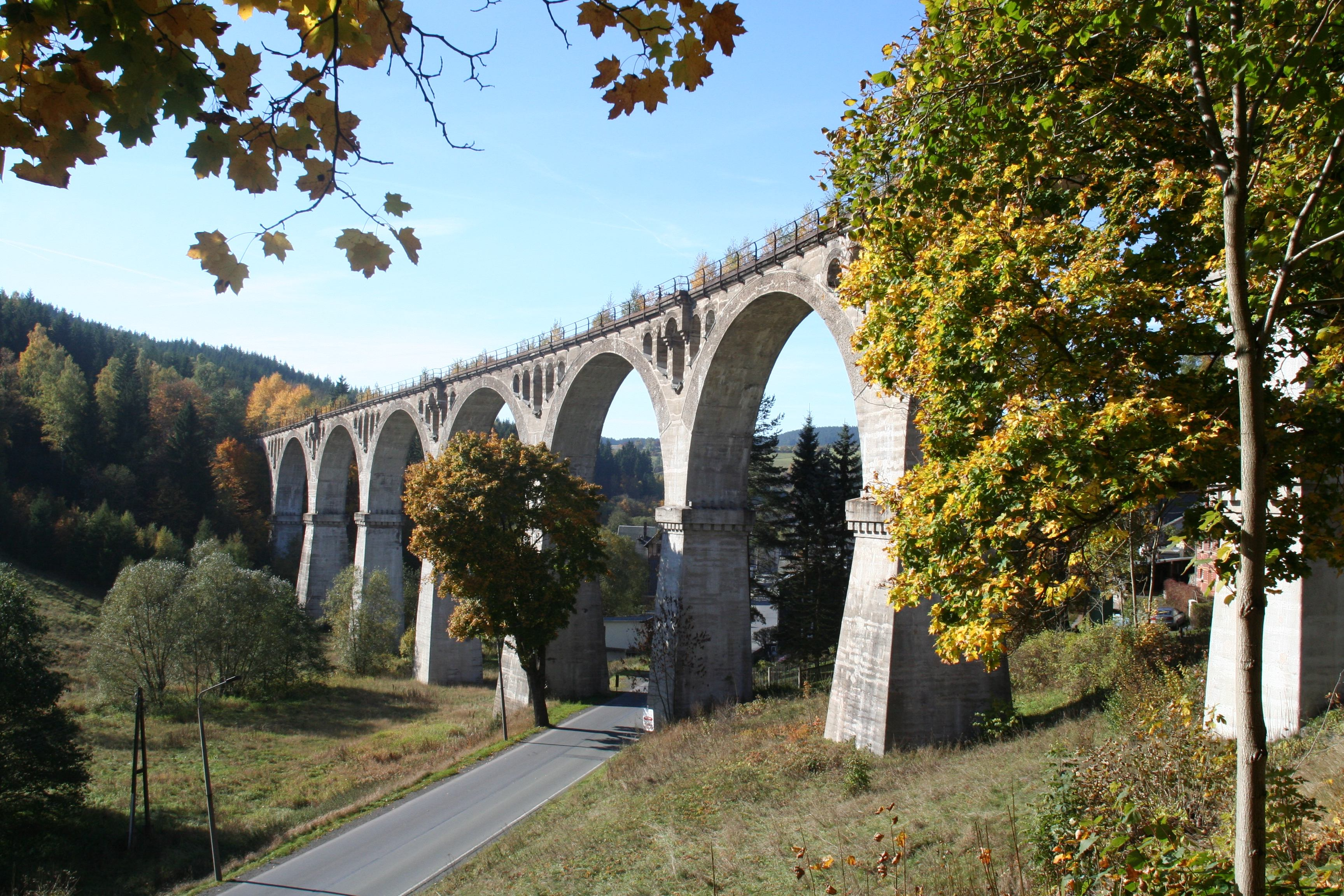
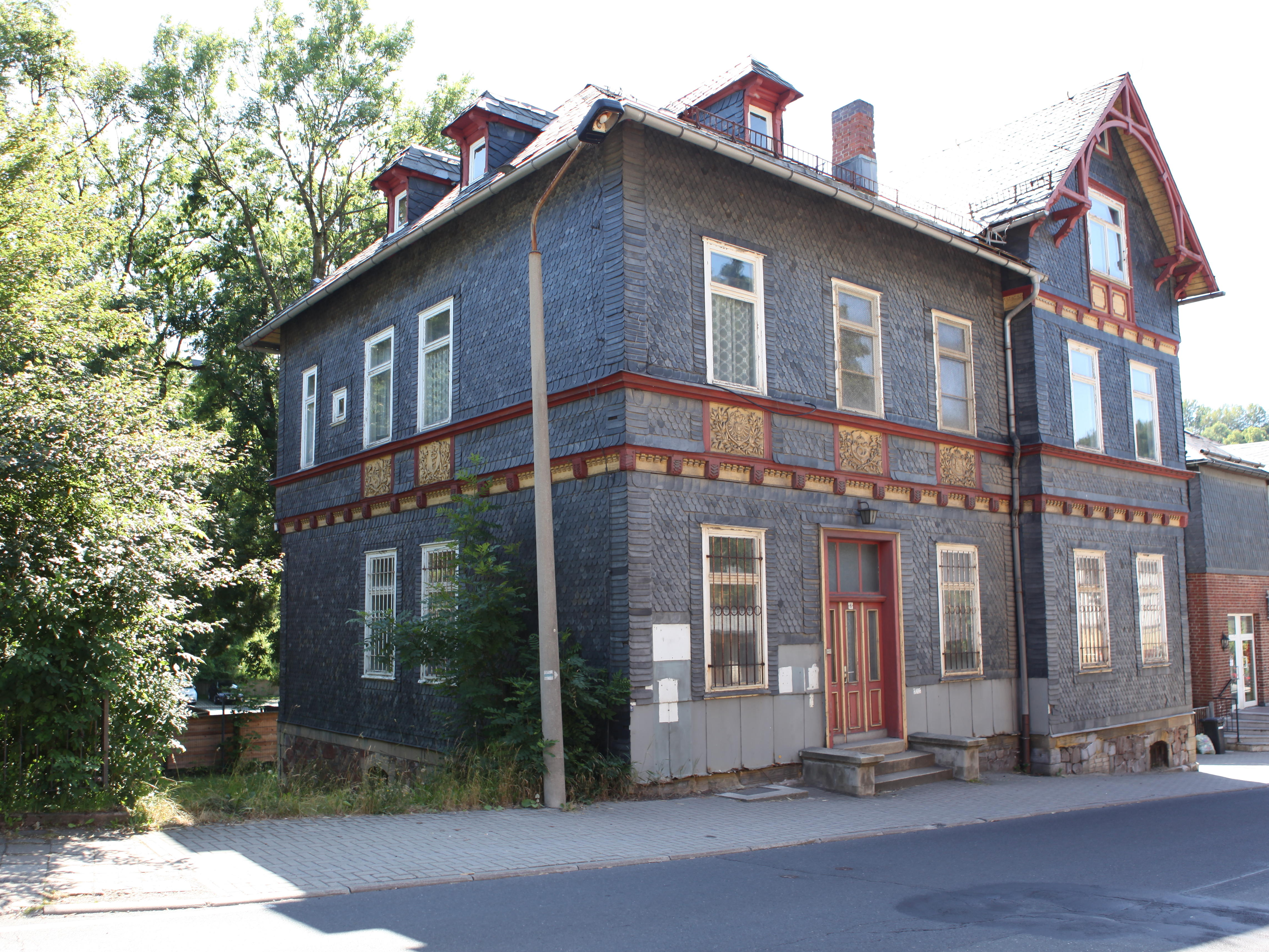
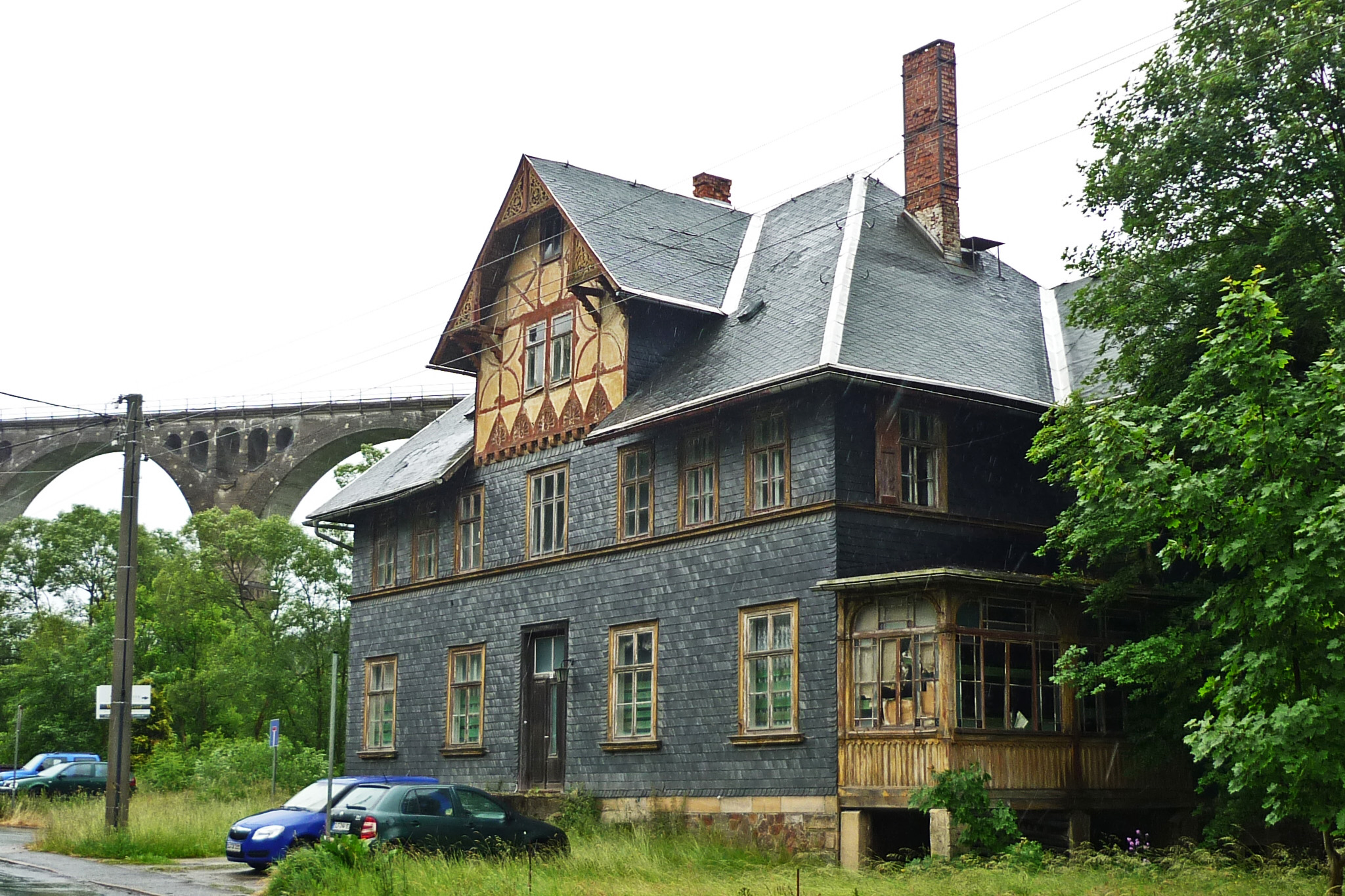
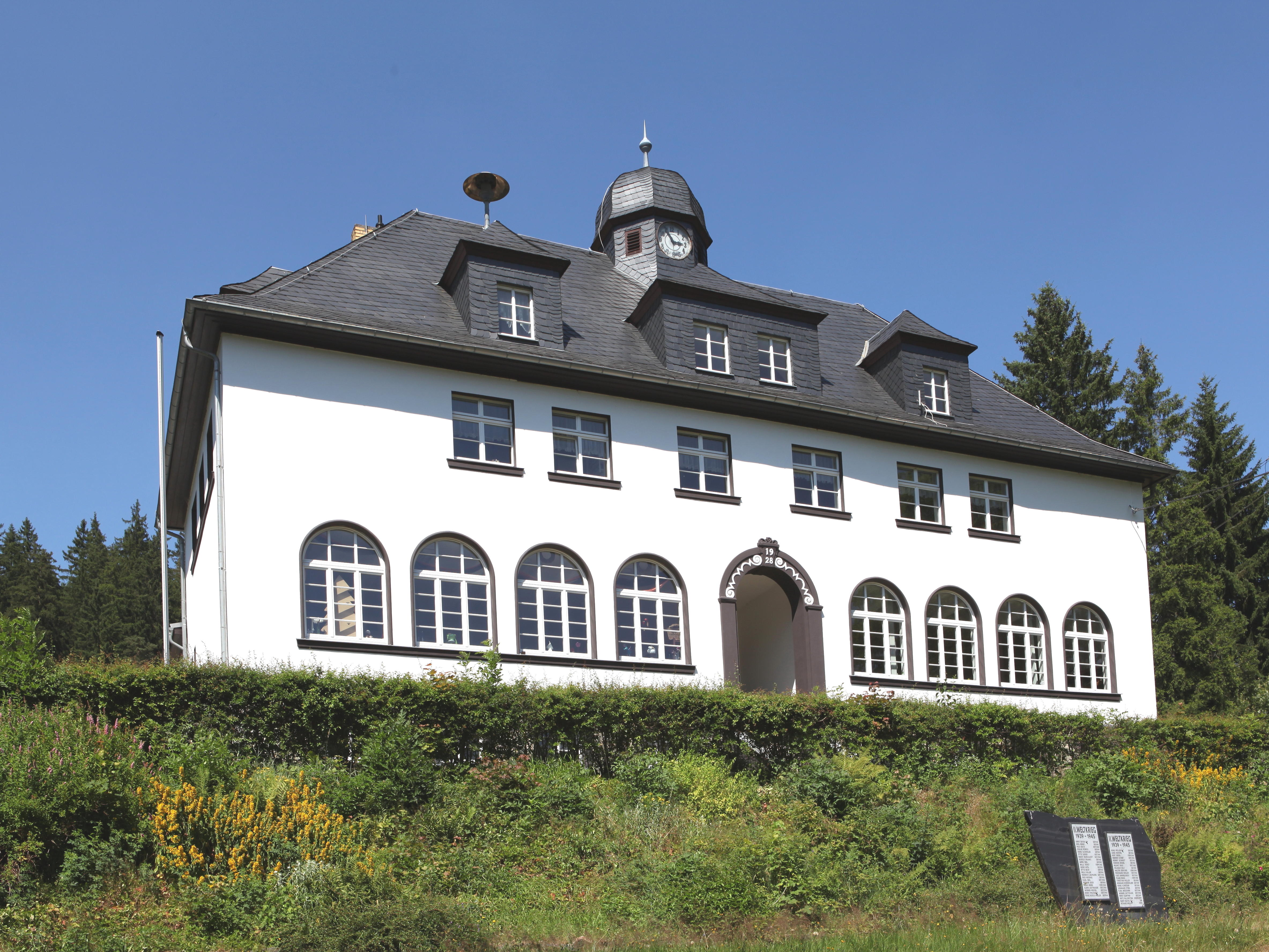
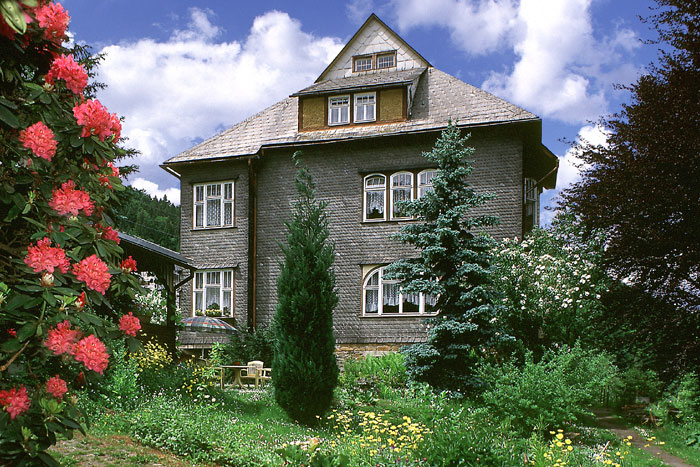
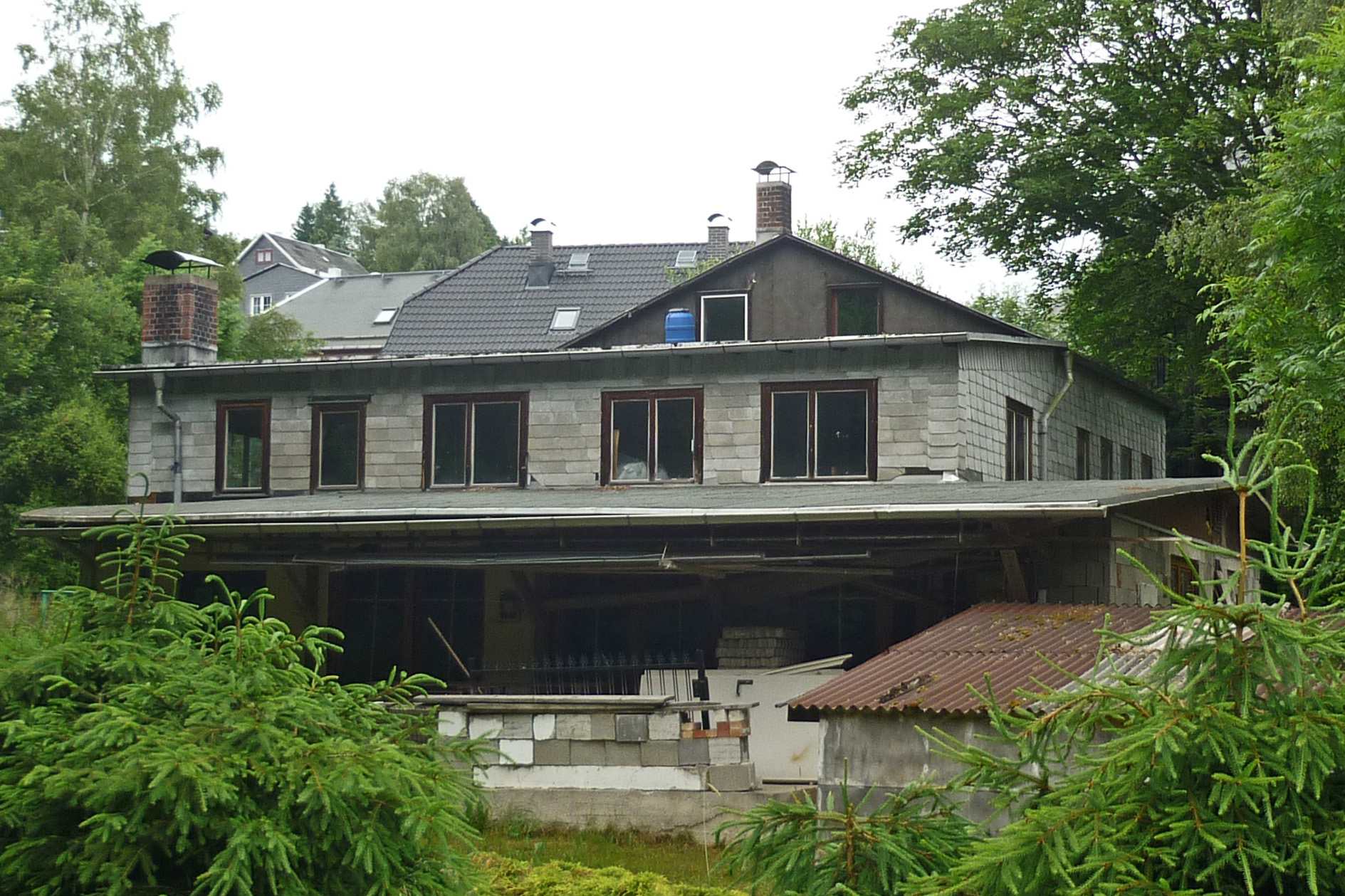
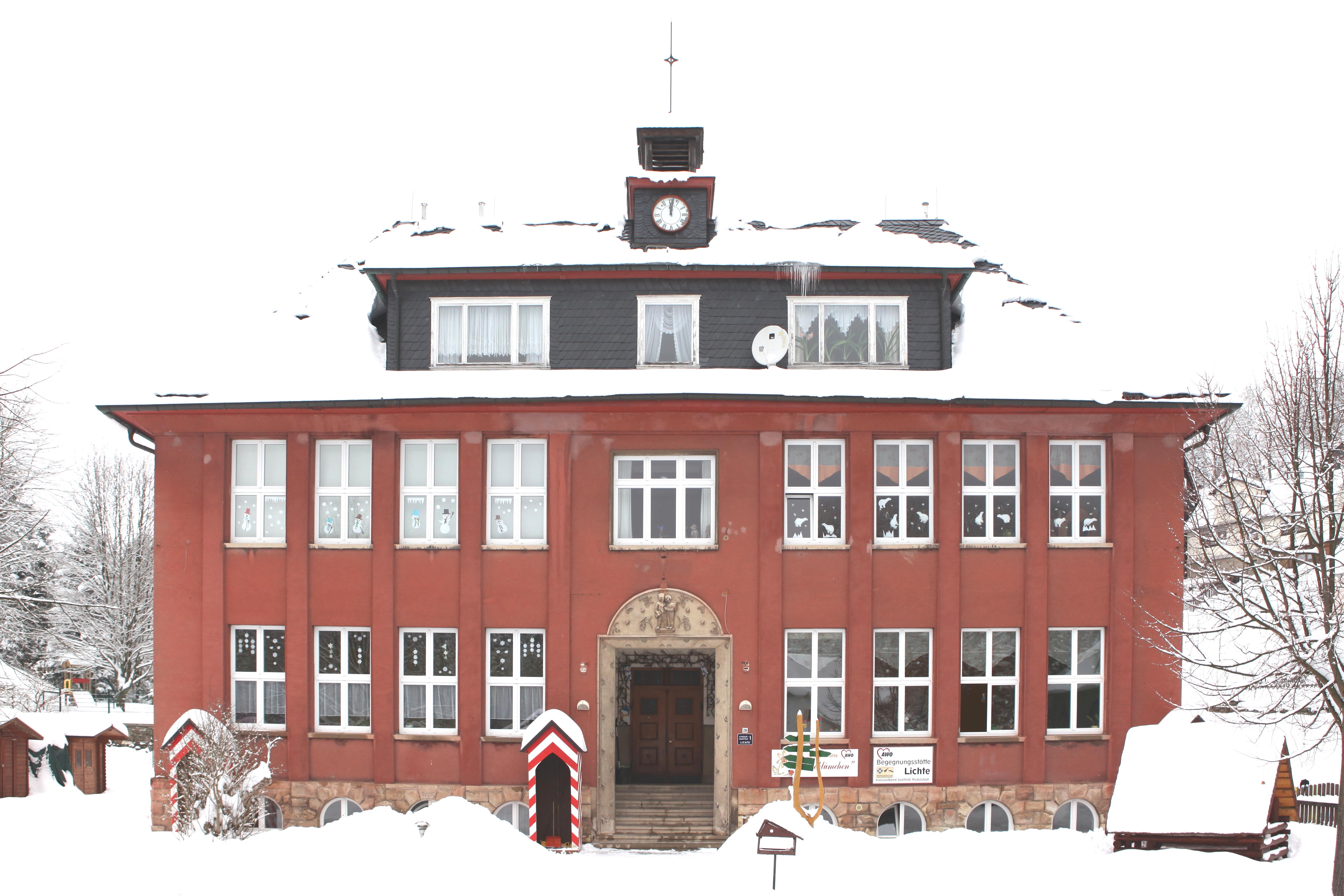
Picture	Description	Municipal section; location	Remark
	Lichte (Thuringia) east station	Wallendorf (Lichte), Am Bahndamm 9	closed 1997
		Lichte (Wallendorf), cemetery	nearby church
	Historical manor-house	Lichte (Wallendorf), Hammerweg 2	with adjoining building, grounds and enclosure
	Historical residential premises	Lichte (Wallendorf), Hammerweg 3	belonging to the manor-house
	Saalfelder Str. 32 in Wallendorf	Lichte (Wallendorf), Kirchweg	Evangelical church dating to 1734
	Parish house	Lichte (Wallendorf), Lamprechtstrasse 12	Vicarage
	Railway viaduct over the Piesau	Lichte (Wallendorf), Saalfelder Str.	closed 1997
	Post office	Lichte (Wallendorf), Saalfelder Str. 8
	historical "Post Hotel"	Lichte (Wallendorf), Saalfelder Str. 32	closed
	Sawmill	Schmidtenhof	historical Geiersthal trip hammer
	Historical school building	Geiersthal; Schulweg 16	1920s, today drafting and model-making school (Homepage of the school)
	historical Perlen-Heinz villa (1908)	Lichte (Geiersthal), Schwarzburger Str. 70	property & residence of factory-owning Heinz/Wiesser family
	Historical sawmill	Lichte (Unterlichte), Sonneberger Str. 57
	Kindergarten	Lichte (Oberlichte), Sonneberger Str. 70	former Lichte school

== Monuments to the casualties of the World Wars ==
- in Lichte (Ascherbach / Waschdorf)
- in Lichte (Bock-und-Teich), B 281 Saalfelder Str., road junction to Piesau
- in Lichte (Geiersthal) on the Dürrer Berg
- in Lichte (Wallendorf) on the Kirchweg

== Monuments of World War II ==
- Lichte (Wallendorf) cemetery: memorial graves for 4 Polish forced labourers
- Lichte cemetery: Memorial plaque to 2 victims of the forced march of inmates from Buchenwald concentration camp in April 1945, who were found in the Finsterer Grund under the rail viaduct.
