= Lichte (Thuringia) station =

Railway station in Germany

General information
- Location: Lichte; Germany
- Coordinates: 50°31′05.06″N 11°11′04.05″E
- Lines: former Sonneberg–Probstzella railway (18.24 km)

History
- Opened: 1913
- Closed: 1997
Location

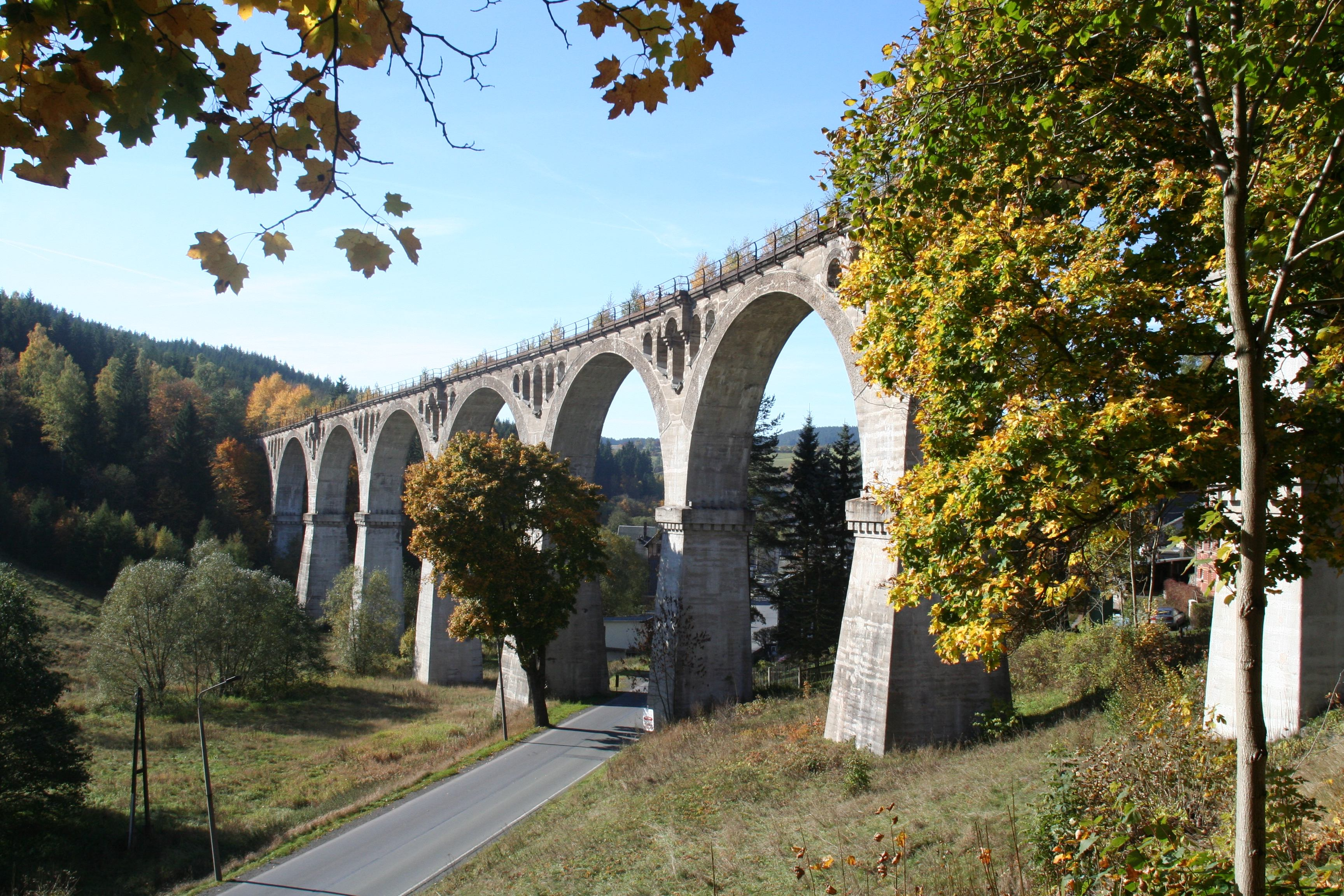
Viaduct Hammerwiesen, distinctive sign of Licht (Wallendorf)

The Lichte (Thuringia) station German: Bahnhof Lichte (Thüringen) was a Deutsche Reichsbahn station in the Thuringian municipality of Lichte in the district of Saalfeld-Rudolstadt. The station is elevated 623 m above Sea Level.

== History ==
The Probstzella–Schmiedefeld line opened at the end of 1898, and it was extended to Lichte-Ost in 1899. At this time that final destination was called "Bock Wallendorrf". But only 10 years later, in 1909, the project to extend the line to Lichte (Thüringen), Ernstthal (with junction to Neuhaus am Rennweg), and further to Lauscha was started. Finally, in 1913 the railway construction was completed and the train service from the Probstzella station to Sonnenberg via Lichte-Ost and Lichte (Thüringen) could be opened.

The railway Sonneberg-Probstzelle survived two World Wars and the GDR period. However, on 22 January 1997, traffic ceased, and in July 2006 the final closure of that particular railway section Ernstthal Gräfenthal was agreed by the Eisenbahnbundesamt.

In the meanwhile the Deutsche Regionaleisenbahn rent this rail line. Since 2008 tourist service by usage of rail-cycle draisines on the rail line from Schmiedefeld (Lichtetal) via Lichte (Thuringia) east station to Lichte (Thuringia) station has been established. The highlight of a draisine tour is the crossing of the Viaduct Hammerwiesen in Lichte (Wallendorf), close to the Lichte (Thuringia) east station.

== See also ==
Lichte (Thuringia) east station
