= Lichte (Thuringia) east station =

Railway station in Lichte, Germany

- Station in autumn 2008

General information
- Other names: Bahnhof Lichte (Thüringen) Ost
- Location: Lichte; Germany
- Coordinates: 50°31′31.03″N 11°12′27″E
- Lines: former Sonneberg–Probstzella railway (km 18.24)
- Platforms: 2

Other information
- Station code: ULIO

History
- Opened: 1899
- Closed: 1997
Location

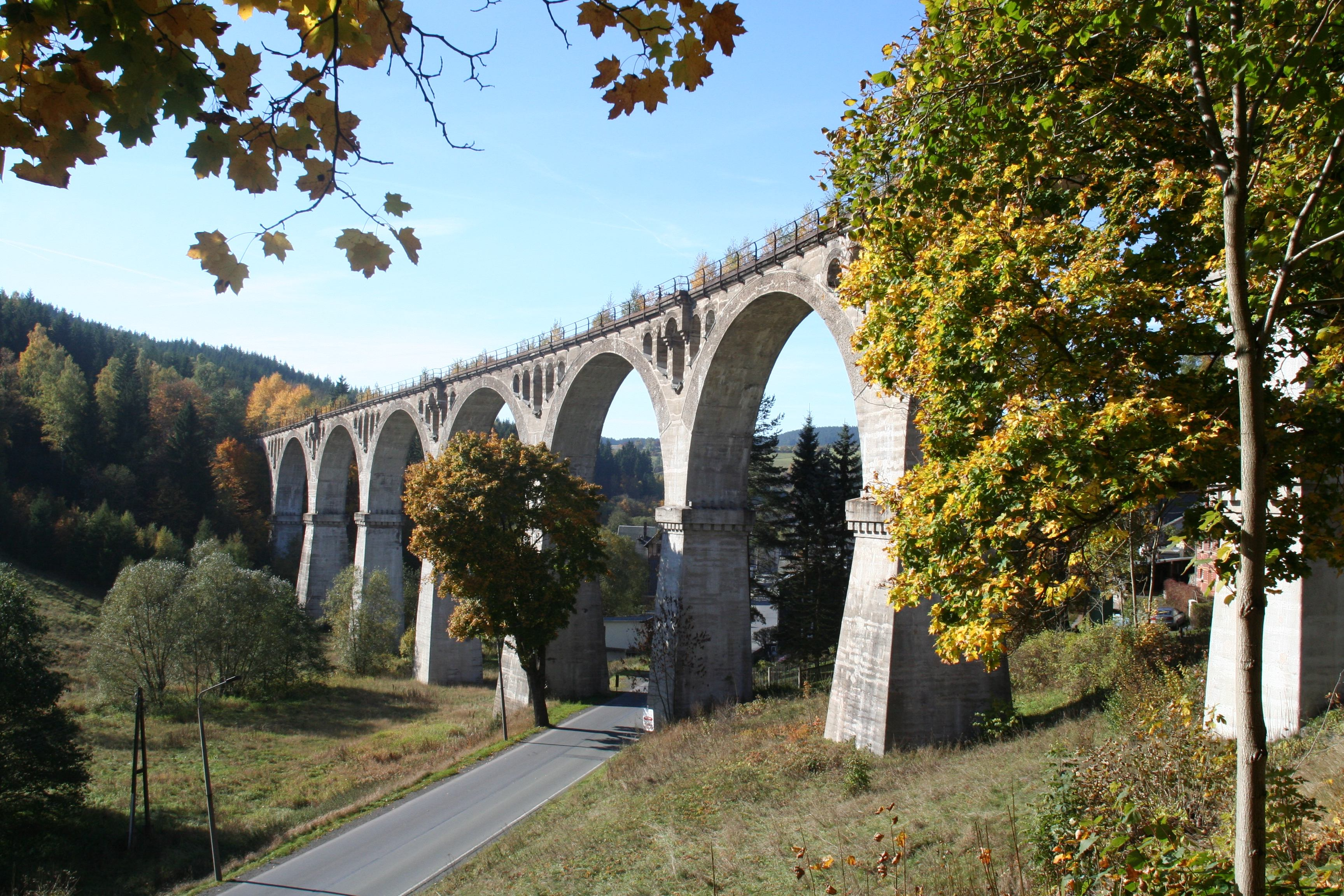
Viaduct Hammerwiesen, distinctive sign of Licht (Wallendorf)

The Lichte (Thuringia) east station (German: Bahnhof Lichte (Thüringen) Ost) was a Deutsche Reichsbahn station in the Thuringian municipality of Lichte (Wallendorf), in the district of Saalfeld-Rudolstadt.

This now-defunct station is located on an altitude of 618.54 m above NN. There are two platforms, three transit tracks, one street connection, one cargo street, one deposit track, and one track to the goods shed.

Lichte (Thuringia) east station was also an express train station (German: Eilzugstation) on the railway line from Sonneberg to Probstzella.

== History ==
This station was opened on 16 January 1899. The first name was Bock-Wallendorf. It was the new final destination of the railway line from Probstzella to Schmiedefeld (Lichtetal). Only much later, on 31 October 1913, was this terminal station enhanced to an express railway station, as the railway line from Probstzella was extended to Lauscha and Sonneberg. However, with the reduction of goods to be dispatched to, respective exchanged with, the municipality of Lichte and the town Neuhaus am Rennweg, Lichte (Thuringia) east station became less important.

In 1963 the piece-goods and parcels dispatch was closed. And in the 1980s the station lost even more importance, because the number of steam locomotives used was declining and finally ceased, and as a result the local watering point for steam locomotives was closed.

Further on the train station was unstaffed. However, there was a stop for the semi-fast trains from Sonneberg to Leipzig, in distinction to the Lichte (Thuringia) station next to it.

Because of technical shortcomings the train service was suddenly withdrawn on 22 January 1997. On 1 July 2006 the German Eisenbahnbundesamt agreed to the discontinuance of the train service.

In the meanwhile the Deutsche Regionaleisenbahn rent this rail line. Since 2008 tourist service by usage of rail-cycle draisines on the rail line from Schmiedefeld (Lichtetal) via Lichte (Thuringia) east station to Lichte (Thuringia) station has been established. The highlight of a draisine tour is the crossing of the Viaduct Hammerwiesen in Lichte (Wallendorf), close to Lichte (Thuringia) east station.

== See also ==
Lichte (Thuringia) station

== See also ==
- Cultural monuments in Lichte
