= Piesau (river) =

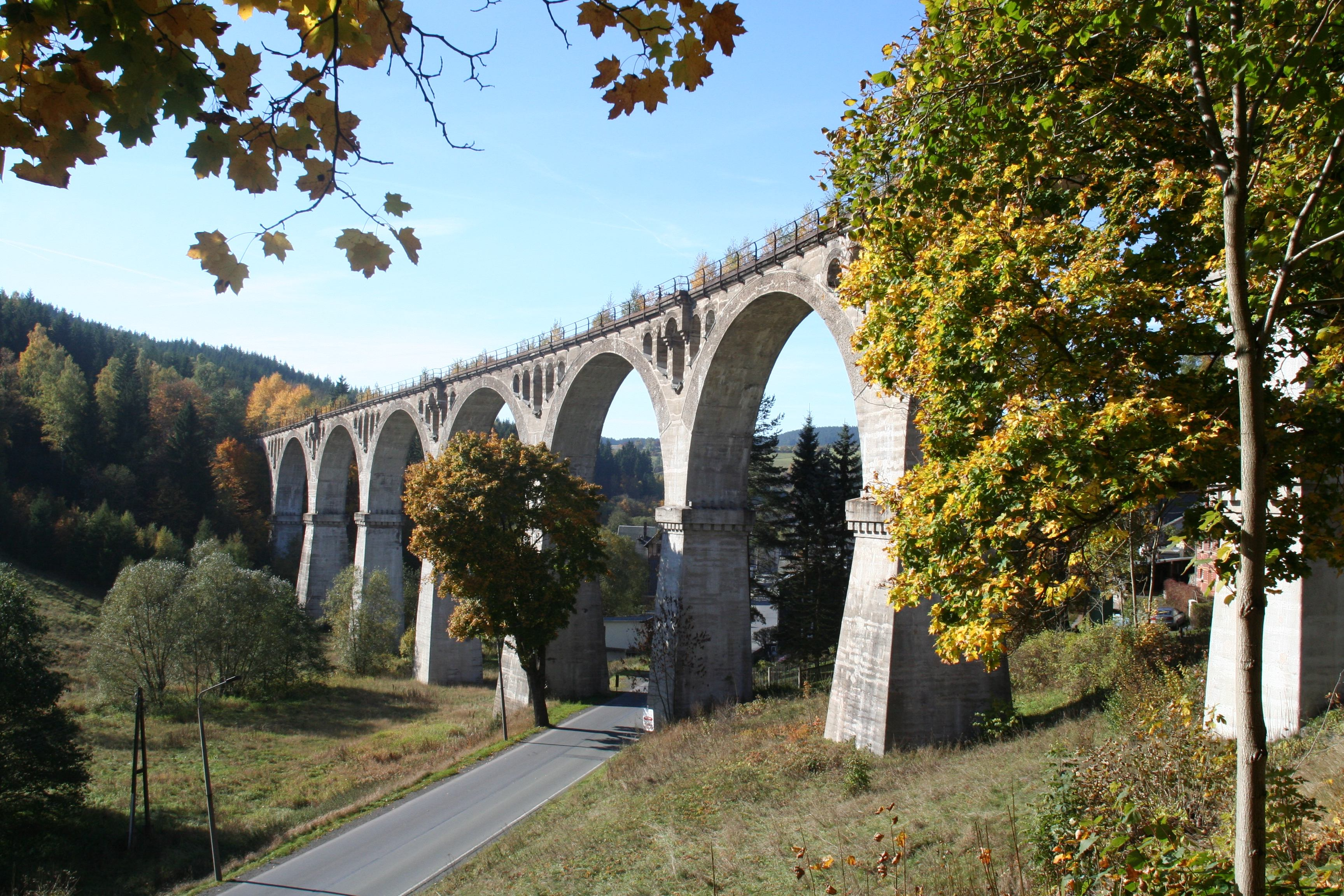
- Rail viaduct over the Piesau valley in Lichte (Wallendorf) close to the Lichte (Thuringia) east station

Location
- Country: Germany
- State: Thuringia

Physical characteristics
- Source
  - location: South of the municipality of Piesau on the Rennsteig
  - coordinates: 50°30′08″N 11°13′09.9″E
  - elevation: 750.9 m (2,464 ft)
- Mouth
  - location: Lichte
  - coordinates: 50°31′34.07″N 11°11′34.08″E
- Length: 7 km (4.3 mi)
- Basin size: Rennsteig
- Discharge
  - average: 569.6 m (1,869 ft)

Basin features
- Progression: Lichte→ Schwarza→ Saale→ Elbe→ North Sea

The Piesau (German pronunciation: [ˈpiːzaʊ]) is a right tributary of the river Lichte in Thuringia, Germany. It is approximately 7 km (4.3 mi) long. The name is derived from the municipality of Piesau.

== Sources ==
The Piesau has its source close to the Rennsteig south of the municipality of Piesau in the Thuringian Highland.

== Course ==
The Piesau rises as the Piesau Kieselbach and flows through the Thuringian Forest Nature Park, first from the Rennsteig, to the municipality of Piesau. Then it merges with the Bärenbach, becoming the Piesau River, and flows north to the district Bock-und-Teich of the municipality of Lichte, the so-called Piesauknie. The Piesau then flows alongside the street Saalfelder Strasse in parallel to B 281. In Wallendorf, close to the Lichte East railway station, it flows under the rail viaduct over the Piesau Valley. In the centre of Lichte (in the Wallendorf district) the Piesau joins the Lichte.

== Name ==
According to old written traditions, the original name of the river was Schmiedebach. This referred to the lower reaches, in the area of Bock-und-Teich of the municipality of Lichte. The present-day name of the river appears only after the foundation of the municipality of Piesau in 1627, derived from the name of the founder, Pisa.

== Tributaries ==
Tributaries of the Piesau river are from the left the Kupfertalbach and from the right the Bärenbach, the Kulmbach, and the Taubenbach.

== Particularity ==
The Piesau and Lichte have unusually steep and deep gorges, the difference between hilltops and valley bottoms often exceeding 100 m.

The Piesau and Lichte and their tributaries in the surrounding valleys have been known for centuries for deposits of placer gold and are considered the most significant sources of gold in Germany. Recreational placer miners continue to find occasional gold nuggets.

== See also ==
- List of rivers of Thuringia
