= Lichtetal am Rennsteig =

Coordinates: 50°31′34″N 11°11′34″E

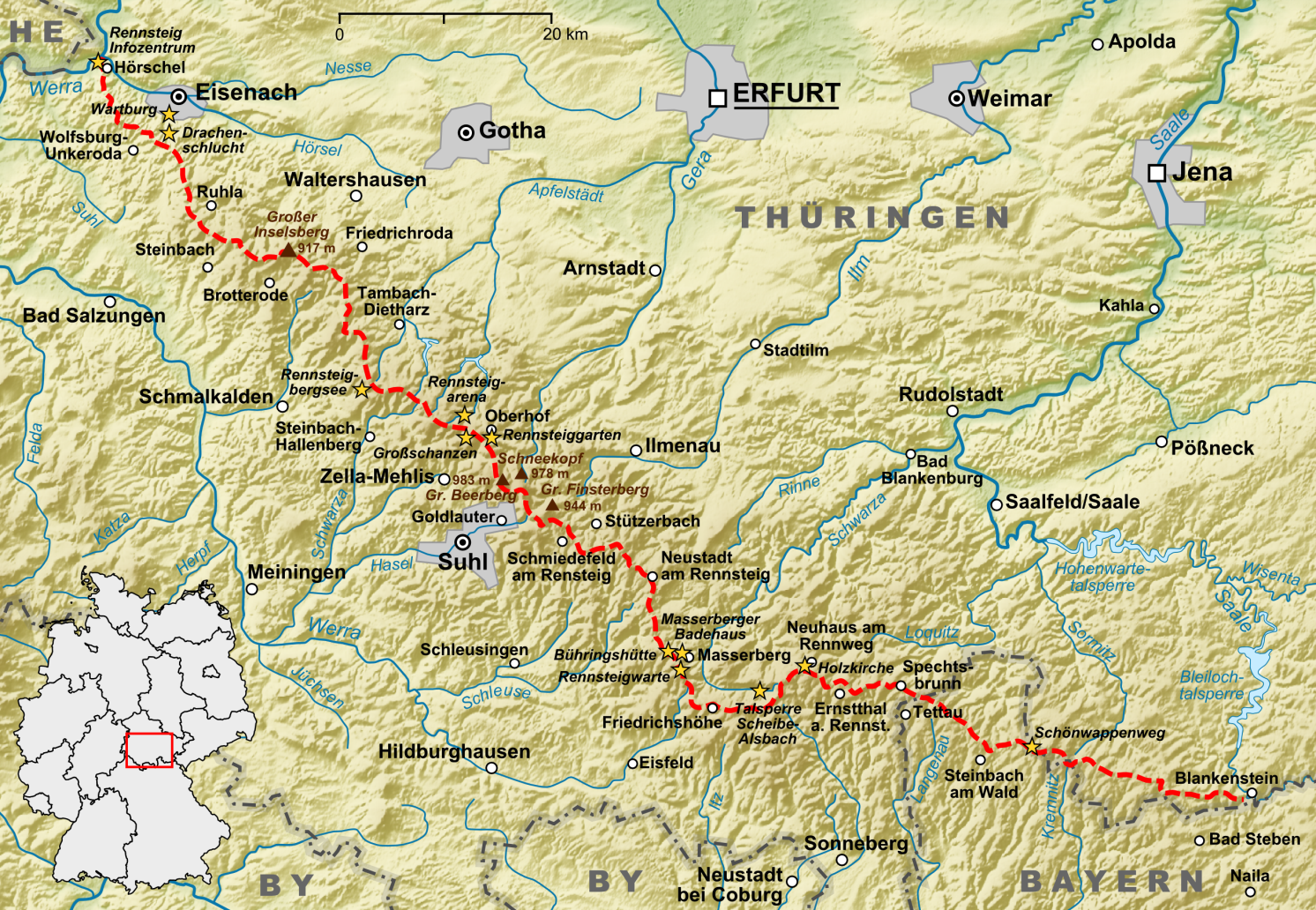
Map of the Rennsteig trail

Lichtetal am Rennsteig is a former municipal association (German: Verwaltungsgemeinschaft) in the district of Saalfeld-Rudolstadt, in Thuringia, Germany. The seat of government was in Lichte (in the Wallendorf section). It was disbanded in January 2019.

The municipal association consisted of the following municipalities:

Municipalities of Lichtetal am Rennsteig
Municipality	Lichte	Piesau	Reichmannsdorf	Schmiedefeld (Lichtetal)
Mayor		Angelika Weigel	Fedor Wohlfarth	Hanno Leide
Inhabitants	1,634	779	817	1,056

== History ==
The municipal association of Lichtetal am Rennsteig was established in line with the administrative reorganization after German reunification. Before 1990, all four municipalities were independent, each with a town hall, administration, and autonomous mayor. The post of mayor is now honorary, with reimbursement of expenses (German: Aufwandsentschädigung). The name Lichtetal am Rennsteig was derived from the close proximity to the Thuringian Rennsteig and the Lichte River.

== Gallery ==
=== Coats of arms ===
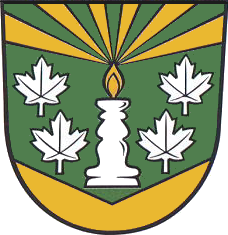
Lichtetal am Rennsteig

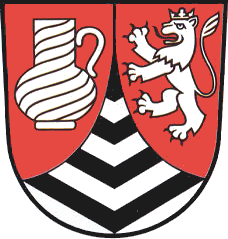
Piesau

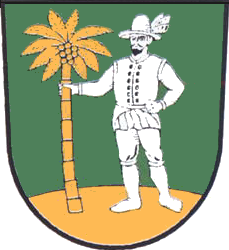
Reichmannsdorf

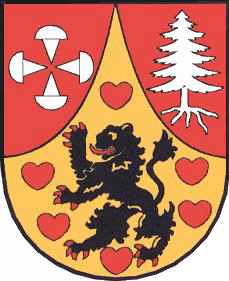
Schmiedefeld

=== Pictures ===
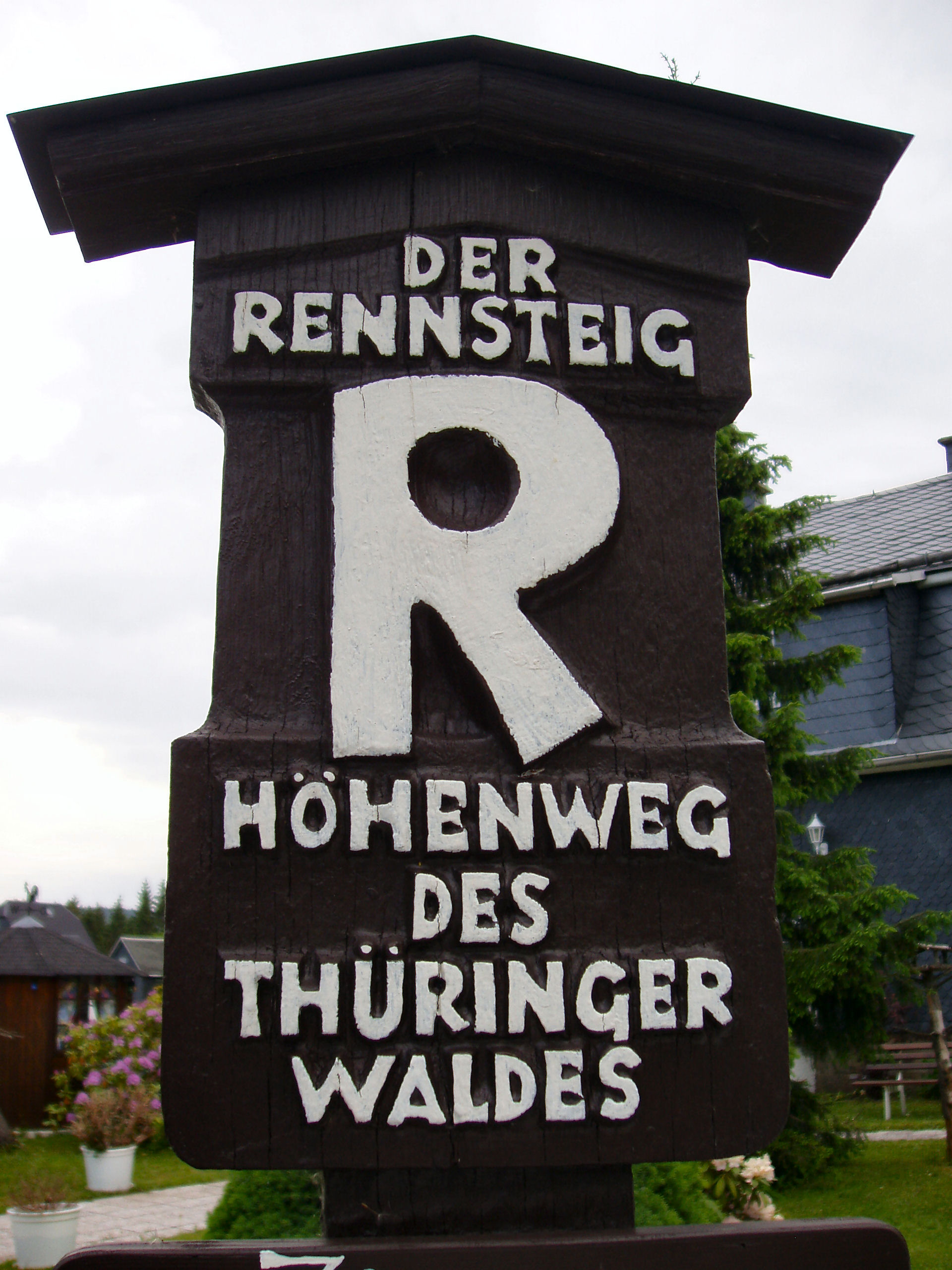
Sign on the Rennsteig trail

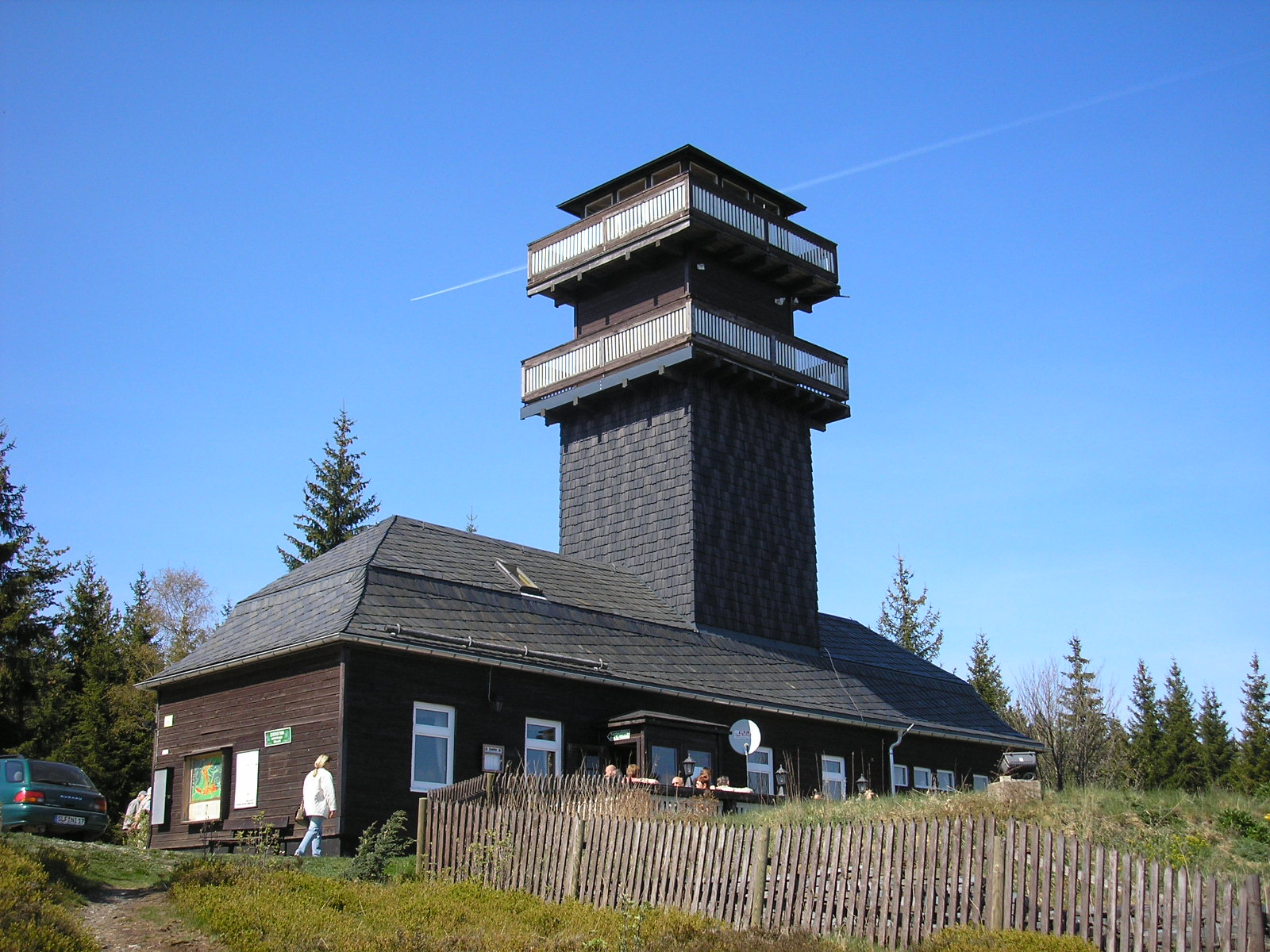
Leipzig tower, Schmiedefeld

== See also ==
- Deesbach Forebay
- Leibis-Lichte Dam
- Municipal associations in Thuringia
- Cultural monuments in Lichte
