= Reichmannsdorf =

- Ortsteil of Saalfeld
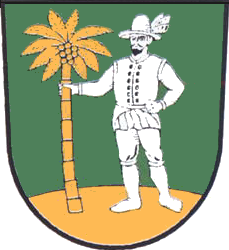
- Coat of arms
- Interactive map of Reichmannsdorf
- Location within Germany Location within Thuringia
- Coordinates: 50°32′53″N 11°15′36″E
- Country: Germany
- State: Thuringia
- District: Saalfeld-Rudolstadt
- Town: Saalfeld

Area
  - Total: 19.99 km^{2} (7.72 sq mi)
- Elevation: 710 m (2,330 ft)

Population (2017-12-31)
  - Total: 767
  - Density: 38.4/km^{2} (99.4/sq mi)
- Time zone: UTC+01:00 (CET)
  - Summer (DST): UTC+02:00 (CEST)
- Postal codes: 98739
- Dialling codes: 036701
- Vehicle registration: SLF

Reichmannsdorf (German pronunciation: [ˈʁaɪçmansdɔʁf]) is a village and a former municipality in the district Saalfeld-Rudolstadt, in Thuringia, Germany. Since 1 January 2019, it is part of the town Saalfeld. Before, it belonged to the municipal association Lichtetal am Rennsteig, which consisted of the municipalities Lichte, Piesau, Reichmannsdorf, and Schmiedefeld.

== See also ==
- Municipal associations in Thuringia
