= Schmiedefeld (Lichtetal) =

- Ortsteil of Saalfeld
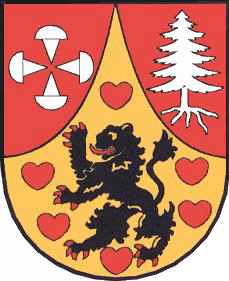
- Coat of arms
- Interactive map of Schmiedefeld
- Location within Germany Location within Thuringia
- Coordinates: 50°32′06″N 11°13′0″E
- Country: Germany
- State: Thuringia
- District: Saalfeld-Rudolstadt
- Town: Saalfeld
- Subdivisions: 2

Area
  - Total: 9.54 km^{2} (3.68 sq mi)
- Elevation: 750 m (2,460 ft)

Population (2017-12-31)
  - Total: 996
  - Density: 104/km^{2} (270/sq mi)
- Time zone: UTC+01:00 (CET)
  - Summer (DST): UTC+02:00 (CEST)
- Postal codes: 98739
- Dialling codes: 036701
- Vehicle registration: SLF

Schmiedefeld (German pronunciation: [ˈʃmiːdəfɛlt]) is a village and (with the municipal section Taubenbach) a former municipality in the district Saalfeld-Rudolstadt, in Thuringia, Germany close to the Thuringian Rennsteig. Since 1 January 2019, it is part of the town Saalfeld. Before, it belonged to the municipal association Lichtetal am Rennsteig, which consisted of the municipalities Lichte, Piesau, Reichmannsdorf, and Schmiedefeld.

== See also ==
- Municipal associations in Thuringia

== Places of interest ==
- The Morassina, a former mine with many stalactites
