= Morassina =

Inactive mine in Thuringia, Germany

Coordinates: 50°32′06″N 11°13′00″E

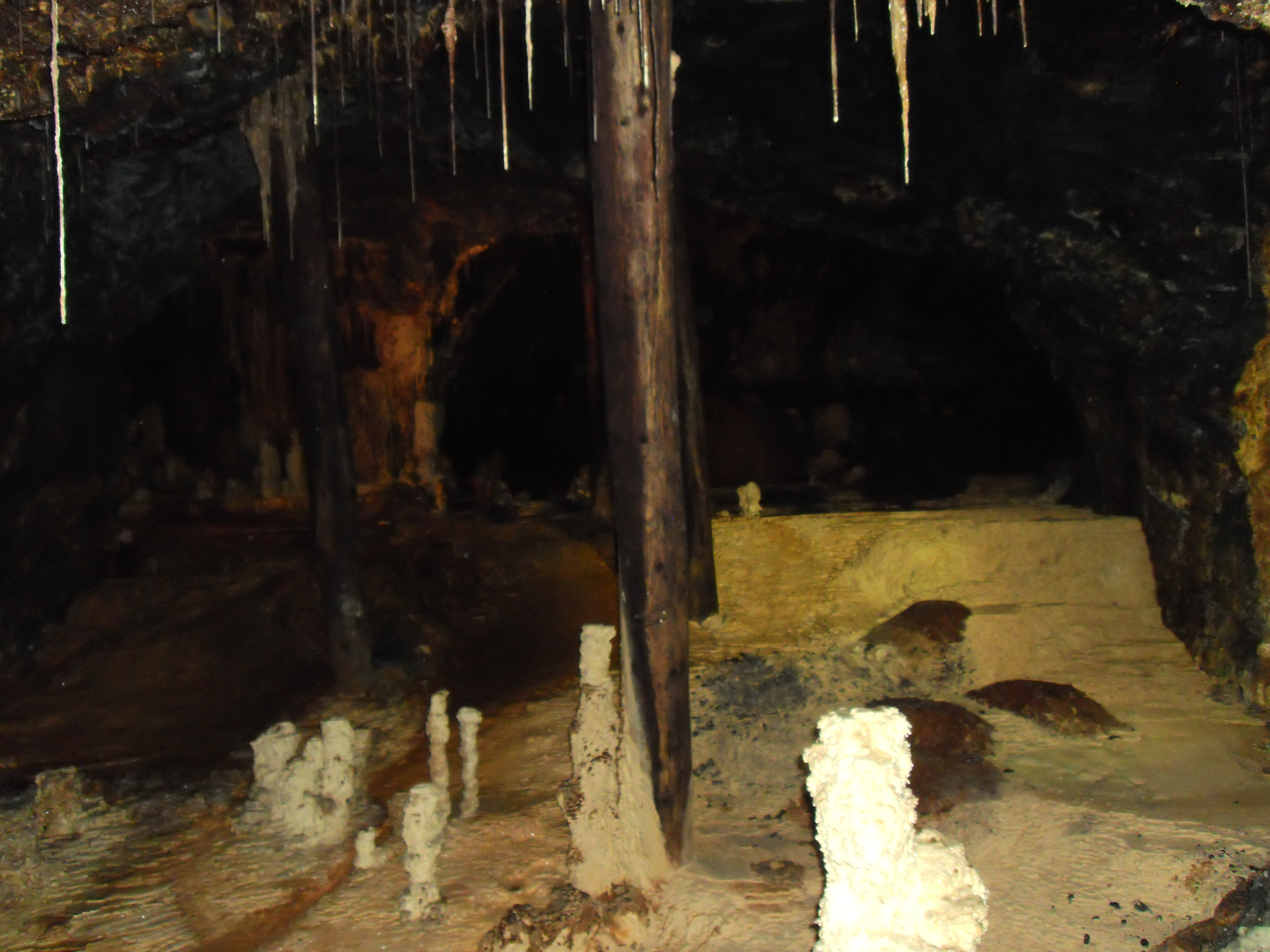
Schaubergwerk Morassina

Morassina is an inactive mine in Schmiedefeld (Lichtetal), Thuringia, Germany. Today it is a tourist attraction known for its stalactites.

== History ==
The first recorded mention of the mine dates to 1683, as a source of alum, iron and copper vitriols (sulfates), sulfur, and colored clay. The colours of the stalactites are produced by the minerals in the mine. In 1717 the merchant Johann Leonard Morassi bought the mine and named it Morassina. In 1750 the Leipzig trading firm of Frege bought it and became extremely wealthy from it; in 1816 they were able to buy back the Crown Jewels of Saxony, carried off by Napoleon, from Amsterdam. However, the bottom fell out of the market after chemical methods of synthesizing alum and sulfuric acid were introduced around 1850. The mine was not worked after 1860, and was closed up and forgotten. In 1851, miners seeking uranium discovered it and the stalactite formations, but because of its location near the Inner German Border, the East German authorities refused until 1989 to allow it to be opened to visitors. It was finally opened in 1993. There is a mining museum (opened in 1995) and the St. Barbara licensed spa (opened in 1997); radium cures are offered.

== See also ==
- List of show caves in Germany

== Sources ==
- S. Köhler and S. Schmitz. "Minerale des Schaubergwerkes Morassina". Bergakademie Freiberg June 10, 1995 (unpublished) (in German)
- B. Ullrich et al. "Sekundärmineralbildungen des Alaunschieferbergwerkes Morassina bei Schmiedefeld am Rennweg (Saalfelder Höhe) im Thüringischen Schiefergebirge". Beiträge zur Geologie Thüringens Neue Folge 12 (2005) 41–69 (in German)
- B. Ullrich and B. Ullrich. "Schwertmannit in den Verwitterungsprodukten des Alaunschieferbergwerkes 'Morassina' bei Schmiedefeld im Thüringer Schiefergebirge". Der Aufschluss 61 (2010) 75–79 (in German)
