= Municipal associations in Thuringia =

In the Free state of Thuringia (de:Freistaat Thueringen) there is the possibility to establish municipal associations (de:Verwaltungsgemeinschaften) according to § 46 of the Thuringian Communal- and District Order (de: Thueringer Kommunalordnung –TuerKO). In addition, the transference of administration procedures to a particular fulfilling municipality (erfüllende Gemeinde) might be possible as well.

== Municipal association ==
- See the article Municipal association

== Survey of the municipal associations in Thuringia ==
1 District Altenburger Land
2 District Landkreis Eichsfeld
3 District Landkreis Gotha
4 District Landkreis Greiz
5 District Landkreis Hildburghausen
6 District Ilm-Kreis
7 District Kyffhäuserkreis
8 District Landkreis Nordhausen
9 District Saale-Holzland-Kreis
10 District Saale-Orla-Kreis
11 District Saalfeld-Rudolstadt

- Municipal association Bergbahnregion/Schwarzatal
- Municipal association Lichtetal am Rennsteig
- Municipal association Mittleres Schwarzatal
- Municipal association Probstzella-Lehesten-Marktgölitz

12 District Schmalkalden-Meiningen
13 District Sömmerda
14 District Unstrut-Hainich-Kreis
15 District Wartburgkreis
16 District Weimarer Land
