= Lichte Porzellan =

German porcelain company

Coordinates: 50°31′05.4″N 11°10′44.4″E

Lichte porcelain
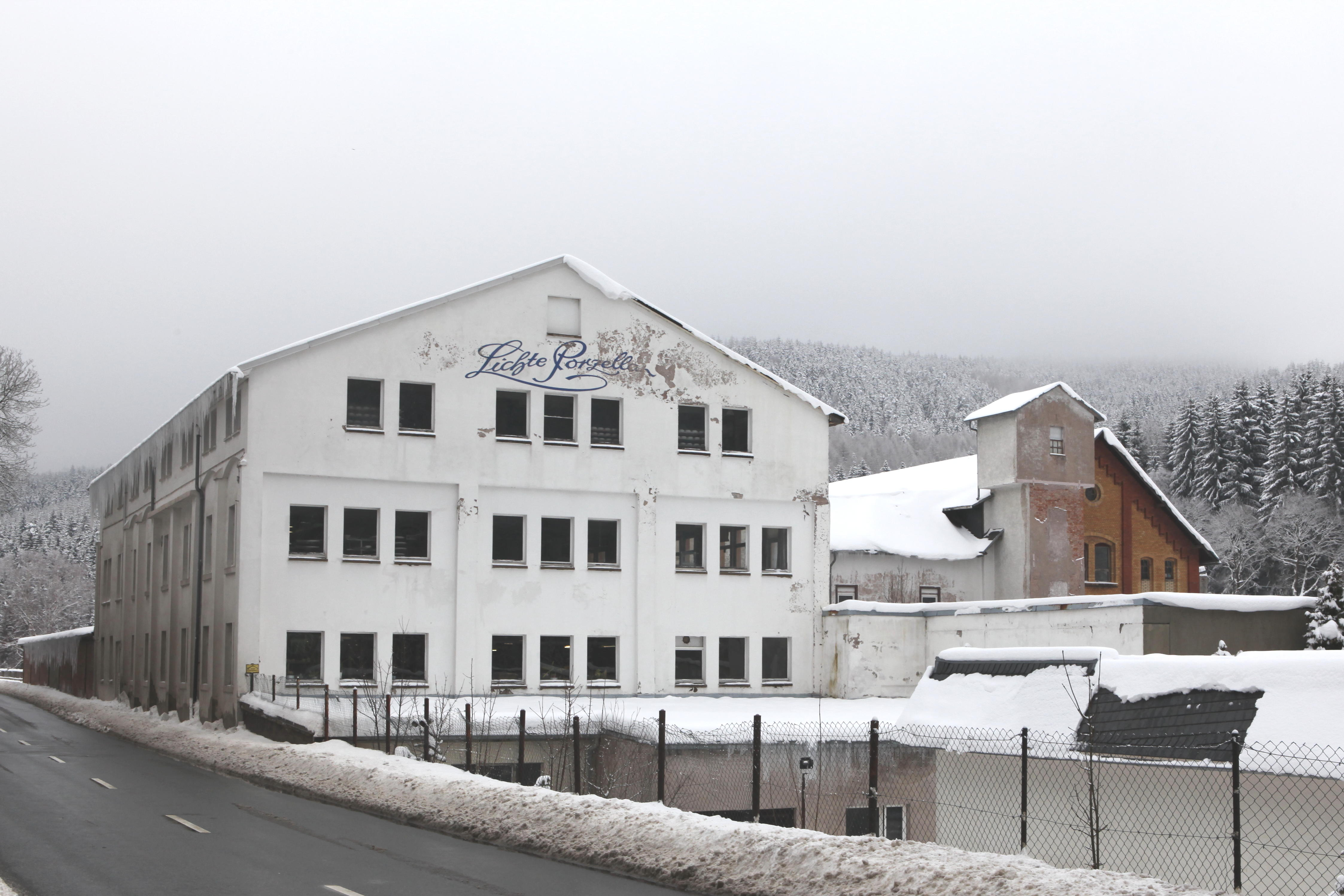
- Main building of the manufactury in the street Sonneberger-Strasse
- Type: Company with limited liability
- Founded: 1822
- Headquarters: Lichte, Germany
- Products: Porcelain, Porcelain painting, Figurines
- Website: Lichte porcelain

The Lichte Porcelain (GmbH) (German: Lichte Porzellan (GmbH)) was founded 1822 in Lichte, Thuringian Highlands.

== History ==
On the northern hillside of the Thuringian Highland, close to the Rennsteig, where the early settlements of the Thuringian porcelain manufacturing took its rise, Johann Heinrich Leder established in 1822 a new porcelain manufacturer, today’s Lichte Porcelain (GmbH).

== Early work ==
Since its founding, Lichte Porcelain has been in close competition with Wallendorf porcelain manufacture, which was established in 1764.

== Structure of the manufacture ==
Structure, owners, proprietors, and managing directors since 1822
Time	Description	Owned By	Comments
1822–1824	Lichte Porcelain		Owned by Johann Heinrich Leder
1824–1830	Lichte Porcelain		Owned by Wilhel & Heinrich Liebmann
1830–1840	Lichte Porcelain		Exclusive possession by W. Liebmann
1840–1846	Lichte Porcelain	Heubach brothers company	Owned by Christoph & Phillipp Heubach
1846–1848	Lichte Porcelain	Heubach brothers company	Owned by Anton Heubach (son of C. Heubach)
1848–1876	Lichte Porcelain	Heubach brothers company	Owned by A. & Louis Heubach (son of P. Heubach)
1876–1887	Lichte Porcelain	Heubach brothers company	After the 1876 retirement of A. Heubach; exclusive possession by L. Heubach Participation of his sons Hermann, Philipp & Ottokar (1886 death of Hermann)
1887–1904	Lichte Porcelain	Heubach brothers company	Owned by P. & O. Heubach (1889 participation of Richard H.)
1904–1919	Lichte Porcelain	Gebrueder Heubach AG	1904 foundation of the Heubach brothers AG managing directors: the previous holders (1908 participation of Eduard H., son of Hermann)
1919–?	Lichte Porcelain	Gebrueder Heubach AG	Managing director: Eduard Heubach (son of H. Heubach)
-	Lichte Porcelain		
1990–present	Lichte Porcelain (GmbH)	Company with limited liability	Managing director: Mr. Peter

== See also ==
- Lichte, the municipality
- Porcelain manufactures in Europe
