= Schiefergebirge (Verwaltungsgemeinschaft) =

Municipal association in Thuringia, Germany

- Verwaltungsgemeinschaft
- Map of Saalfeld-Rudolstadt highlighting Schiefergebirge
- Interactive map of Schiefergebirge
- Location within Germany Location within Thuringia
- Coordinates: 50°32′N 11°23′E
- Country: Germany
- State: Thuringia
- District: Saalfeld-Rudolstadt
- Seat: Probstzella
- Subdivisions: 3 municipalities

Area
  - Total: 146.7 km^{2} (56.6 sq mi)

Population (2025-12-31)
  - Total: 5,973
  - Density: 40.72/km^{2} (105.5/sq mi)
- Time zone: UTC+01:00 (CET)
  - Summer (DST): UTC+02:00 (CEST)
- Website: www.vg-schiefergebirge.de

Schiefergebirge (before 31 December 2013: Probstzella-Lehesten-Marktgölitz) is a Verwaltungsgemeinschaft ("municipal association") in the district Saalfeld-Rudolstadt, in Thuringia, Germany. It takes its name from the German name of the Thuringian Highland. The seat of the Verwaltungsgemeinschaft is in Probstzella.

The Verwaltungsgemeinschaft Schiefergebirge consists of the following municipalities:

1. Gräfenthal
2. Lehesten
3. Probstzella
