= Piesau =

- Ortsteil of Neuhaus am Rennweg
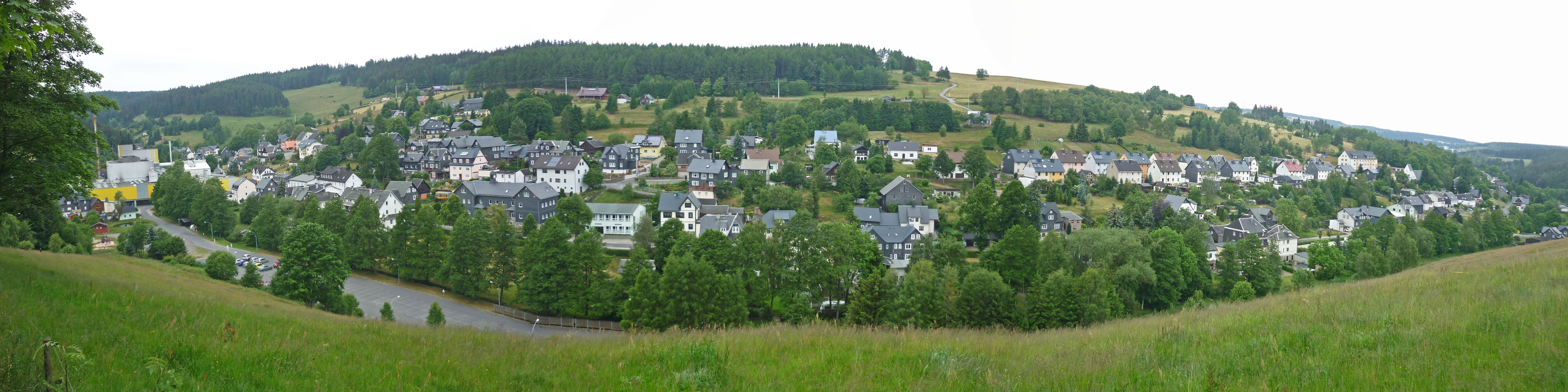

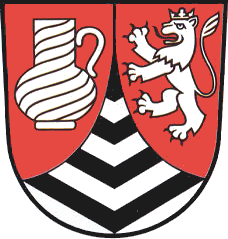
- Coat of arms
- Interactive map of Piesau
- Location within Germany Location within Thuringia
- Coordinates: 50°30′52″N 11°13′08″E
- Country: Germany
- State: Thuringia
- District: Sonneberg
- Town: Neuhaus am Rennweg

Area
  - Total: 7.89 km^{2} (3.05 sq mi)
- Elevation: 640 m (2,100 ft)

Population (2017-12-31)
  - Total: 715
  - Density: 90.6/km^{2} (235/sq mi)
- Time zone: UTC+01:00 (CET)
  - Summer (DST): UTC+02:00 (CEST)
- Postal codes: 98739
- Dialling codes: 036701
- Vehicle registration: SON
- Website: www.piesau.de

Piesau (German pronunciation: [ˈpiːzaʊ]) is a village and a former municipality in the district of Sonneberg in Thuringia, Germany, close to the Thuringian Rennsteig. Formerly in the district Saalfeld-Rudolstadt, it is part of the town Neuhaus am Rennweg since January 2019.

It has a glass factory and is known as a glass-maker village. The first time glass was made in Piesau was in 1622. Up until today glass is the main reason of existence in Piesau. Carl Heinz Glass produces glass bottles as well as plastic caps and closures for the perfume and cosmetic industry. The inventor of the first usable röntgenglass (Carl Heinrich Florenz Müller) descends from the village. Piesau lies next to the "Rennsteig", a hiking path of more than 160 kilometres throughout Thüringen.

Before 2019, it was part of the municipal association Lichtetal am Rennsteig, which consists of the municipalities Lichte, Piesau, Reichmannsdorf, and Schmiedefeld.
