= Probstzella =

- Municipality
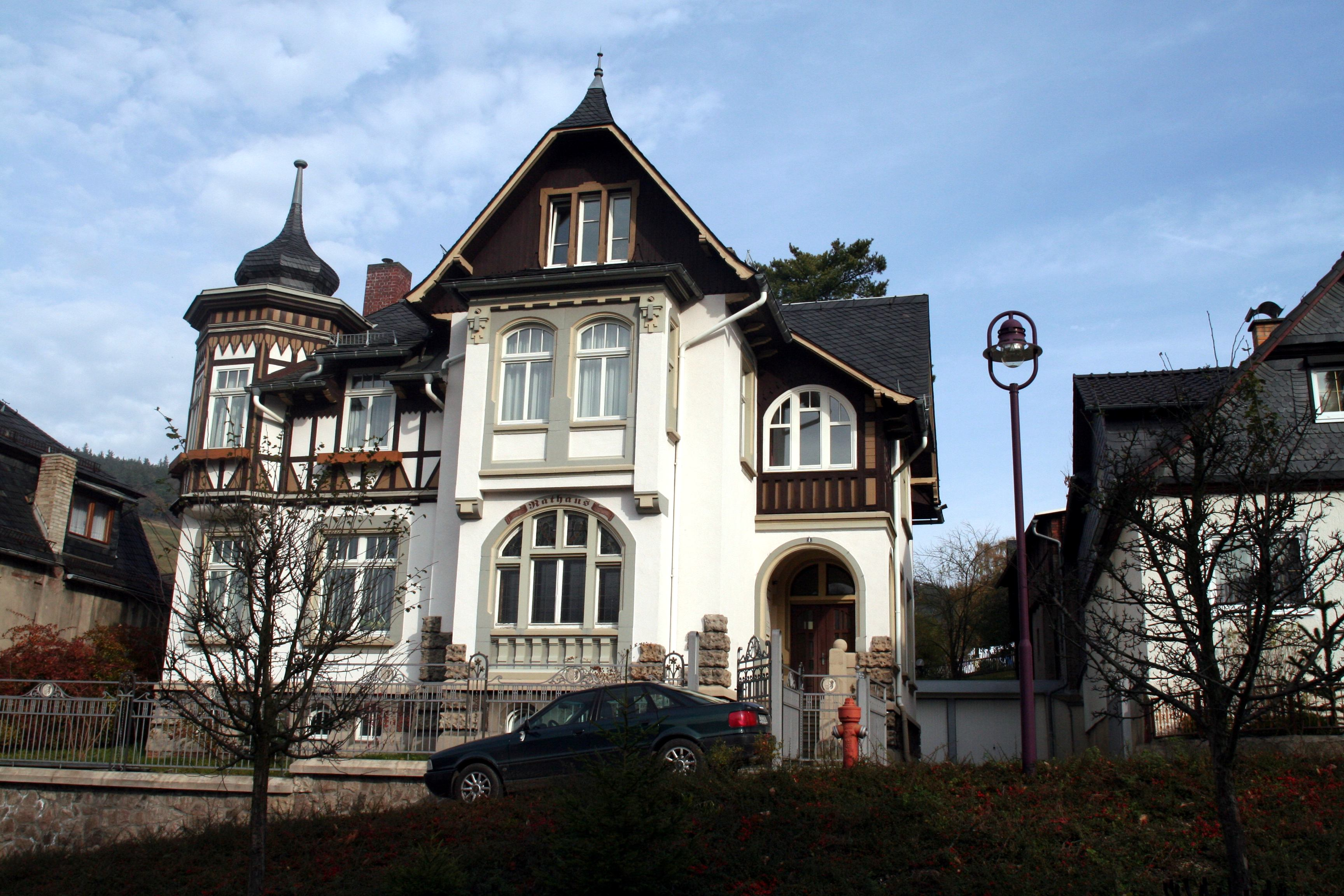
- Town hall

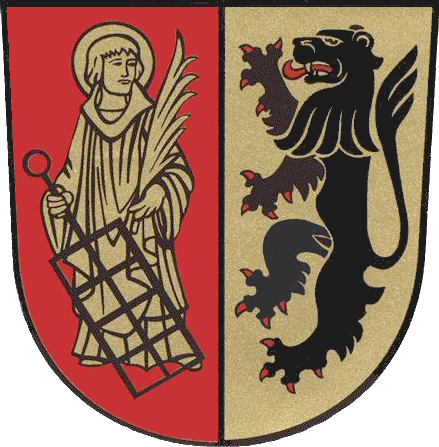
- Coat of arms

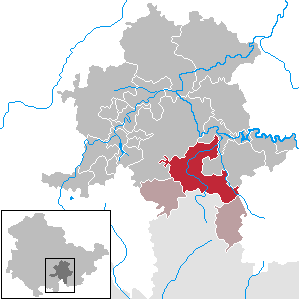
- Location of Probstzella within Saalfeld-Rudolstadt district
- Interactive map of Probstzella
- Location within Germany Location within Thuringia
- Coordinates: 50°31′57″N 11°22′43″E
- Country: Germany
- State: Thuringia
- District: Saalfeld-Rudolstadt
- Municipal assoc.: Schiefergebirge
- Subdivisions: 20

Government
  - Mayor (2019–25): Sven Mechtold (SPD)

Area
  - Total: 74.26 km^{2} (28.67 sq mi)
- Elevation: 340 m (1,120 ft)

Population (2025-12-31)
  - Total: 2,672
  - Density: 35.98/km^{2} (93.19/sq mi)
- Time zone: UTC+01:00 (CET)
  - Summer (DST): UTC+02:00 (CEST)
- Postal codes: 07330
- Dialling codes: 036735
- Vehicle registration: SLF
- Website: www.einheitsgemeinde-probstzella.de

Probstzella is a municipality in the district Saalfeld-Rudolstadt, in Thuringia, Germany.

== History ==
Between 1945 and 1990 Probstzella station served as East German inner German border crossing for rail transport. The crossing was open for trains travelling between the Soviet Zone of occupation in Germany (till 1949, thereafter the East German Democratic Republic) or West Berlin on the one hand, and the American zone of occupation (until 1949), thereafter the West German Federal Republic of Germany, on the other. The traffic was subject to the Interzonal traffic regulations that between West Germany and West Berlin followed the special regulations of the Transit Agreement (1972).

== Famous people ==
- Ludwig Greiner, was born in the village Lichtentanne (today part of Probstzella), identified Gerlachovský Peak as the summit of the Carpathians
