= Lichte =

- Ortsteil of Neuhaus am Rennweg
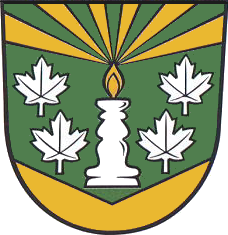
- Coat of arms
- Interactive map of Lichte
- Location within Germany Location within Thuringia
- Coordinates: 50°31′34″N 11°11′34″E
- Country: Germany
- State: Thuringia
- District: Sonneberg
- Town: Neuhaus am Rennweg
- Subdivisions: 4 municipal sections

Area
  - Total: 19.36 km^{2} (7.47 sq mi)
- Elevation: 580 m (1,900 ft)

Population (2017-12-31)
  - Total: 1,526
  - Density: 78.82/km^{2} (204.1/sq mi)
- Time zone: UTC+01:00 (CET)
  - Summer (DST): UTC+02:00 (CEST)
- Postal codes: 98739
- Dialling codes: 036701
- Vehicle registration: SON

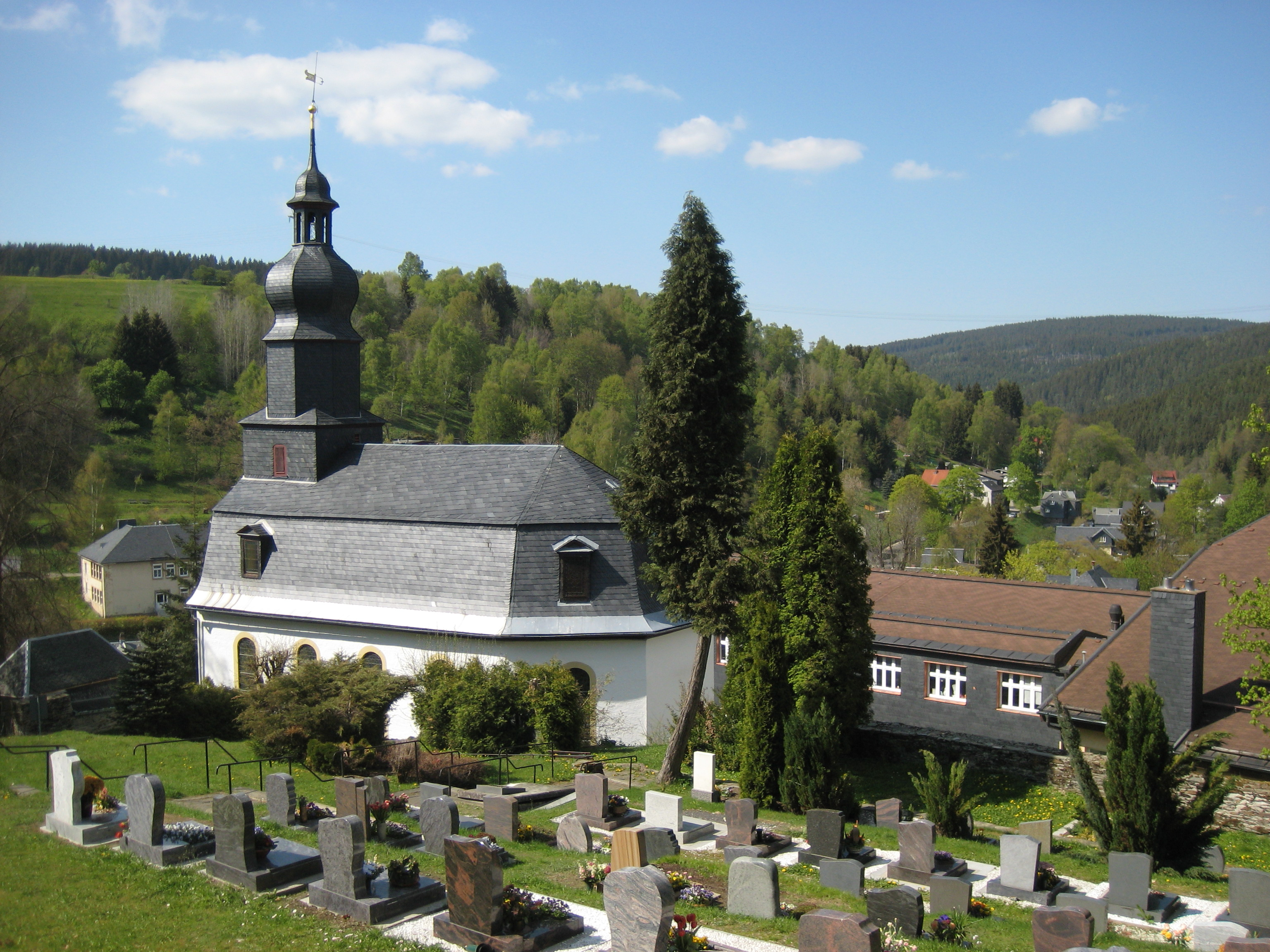
St. Elisabeth´s church, Lichte-Wallendorf, dating to 1734

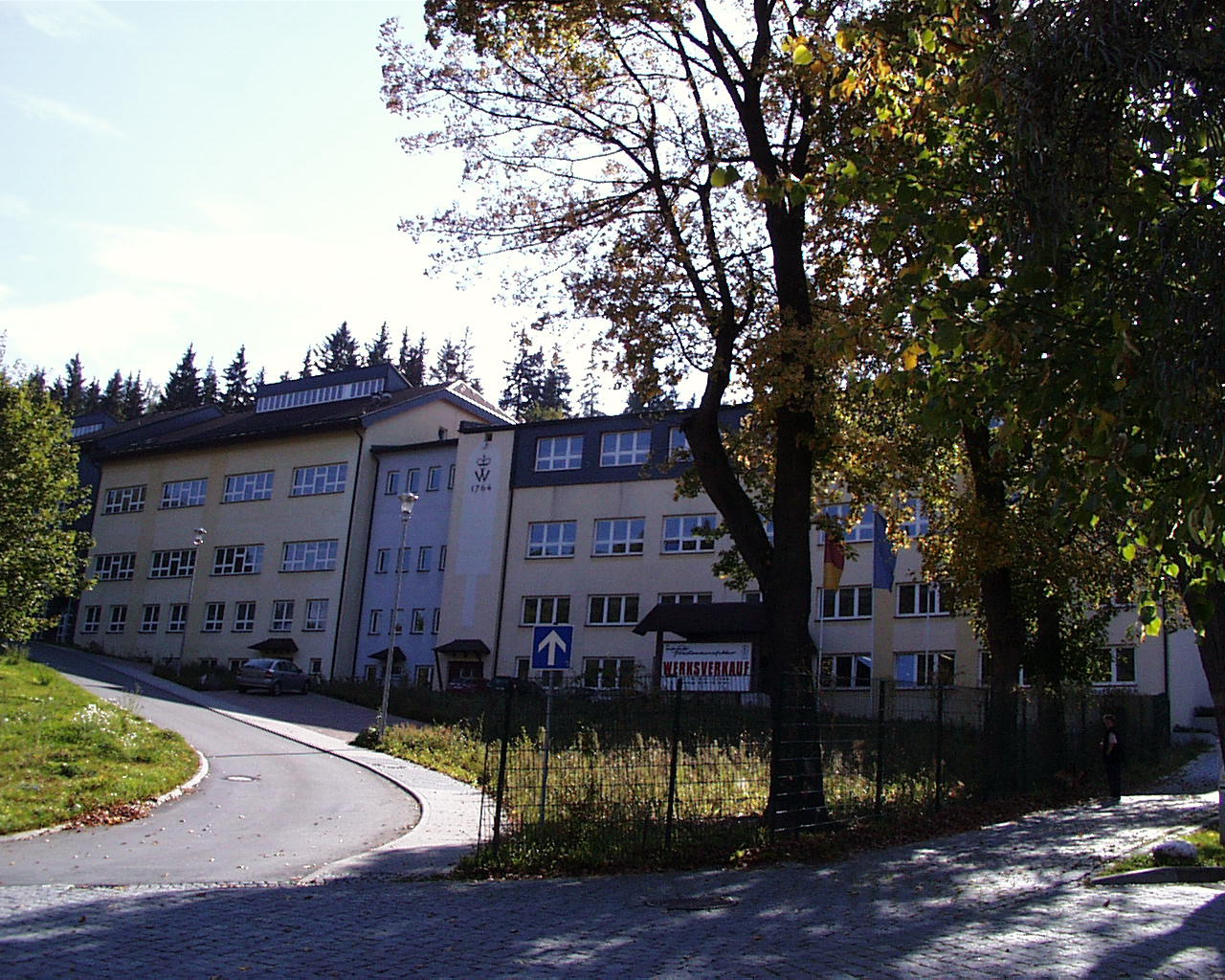
Wallendorfer Porcelain Manufacture, Oct. 2006

Leibis-Lichte Dam, 102.5 m high

Lichte (German pronunciation: [ˈlɪçtə]) is a village and a former municipality in the district of Sonneberg in Thuringia, Germany, close to the Thuringian Rennsteig. Formerly in the district Saalfeld-Rudolstadt, it is part of the town Neuhaus am Rennweg since January 2019.

== Geography ==
Lichte is located between the towns of Saalfeld (to the north), Oberhof / Ilmenau (northwest) and Sonneberg / Coburg (south) at an altitude of 600 m (NHN), in the centre of the Thuringian Highlands / Thuringian Forest Nature Park. Distinctive sign of Lichte is the railway viaduct established in 1909 (see picture right).

It is a typical Thuringian Forest village, reaching far into the valleys of the Lichte River and of its tributary the Piesau. Both of these feed one of the biggest Thuringian drinking water reservoirs, Leibis-Lichte, with the Deesbach Forebay close to the northern end of the village (in Geiersthal). The Lichte River is also one of the sources of the Schwarza River.

The mountain rivers and streams in the area of the Lichte valley have been known for centuries for deposits of placer gold and are considered the most significant sources of gold in Germany.

Around the steep-sided valleys of the Lichte and Piesau, the height difference between hilltops and valley bottoms is often as much as 200 m, which is large for hills of this size.

Mountains surrounding the Lichte Valley
Description	Height above sea level	Direction	Particularity
Spitzer Berg	790.3 m	N NE	Coniferous forest
Rauhhügel	801.9 m	NE	Observation tower, radio mast
Mutzenberg	770.0 m	NE	Coniferous forest
Petersberg	646.0 m	NE	with refuge
Spitzberg	691.2 m	E	with Schönheitsruhe outlook
Kirchberg	685.6 m	SE	Ascent from Wallendorf, Kirchsteig
Mittelberg	803.6 m	S SE	with Kirchberg (688 m)
Apelsberg	785.3 m	SW	
Rückertsbiel	755.6 m	W	
Hahnberg	685.3 m	W	Pastureland
Sauhügel	721.7 m	W	
Geiersbachkopf	717.6 m	W	Headwaters of the Geiersbach, tributary of the Lichte

Sections of the municipality
Bock-und-Teich	Geiersthal	Lichte with: Waschdorf, Ascherbach; Oberlichte; Unterlichte	Wallendorf with: Lamprecht

== History ==
Already in 1764 there was porcelain manufacturing in Lichte (Wallendorf). The Wallendorf porcelain manufacture is one of the oldest in Europe. It quickly achieved a growing customer base beyond the then borders of the country. Thus as early as 1822, Johann Heinrich Leder established in Lichte another porcelain company, today’s Lichte porcelain (GmbH). The new company competed with Wallendorf. However, it was able to rapidly find and keep markets of its own, although the two World Wars followed by East German trade restrictions caused setbacks.

Until 1920, the Lichte River was the dividing line between the district of Saalfeld in Saxe-Meiningen in the east and the rural district of Königsee in Schwarzburg-Rudolstadt in the west. In 1952 the municipality was formed by combining several mountain villages: from south to north, Lichte, Wallendorf, Geiersthal and Bock and Teich. From 1922 to 1952, the municipality belonged to the rural district of Saalfeld, from 1952 to 1994 to the district of Neuhaus, and since then has been in the district of Saalfeld-Rudolstadt.

During World War II, Polish forced labourers worked in Wallendorf; four graves in the cemetery there recall this time. A memorial tablet at the Lichte cemetery commemorates two victims of the death march of inmates from the Buchenwald concentration camp in April 1945 who were found in the depths below the rail viaduct.

=== Heraldry ===
The coat of arms of Lichte, a silver candlestick with gold flame and beams of light between 4 silver maple leaves on a field of green, was approved on July 15, 1995. The candlestick is taken from an ancient seal. It thus perpetuates a traditional symbol of the locality and also represents the centuries-long heritage of porcelain manufacturing that typifies Lichte and the region. The maple leaves symbolize the four sections of the municipality using a tree that is typical of the area. They and the green field also symbolize Lichte's location in the forested Thuringian Highland, while the shape at the base of the shield represents its location in valleys.

== Politics ==
The local government of Lichte and of the former municipal association of Lichtetal am Rennsteig (Lichte Valley on the Rennsteig), which consisted of the municipalities of Lichte, Piesau, Reichmannsdorf, and Schmiedefeld (Lichtetal), were located in the Wallendorf section.

=== Municipal council ===
The municipal council of Lichte consisted of 12 councillors including the mayor, who served in an honorary capacity.

Municipal council as of 2009 communal elections
Year of elections	CDU	Citizens' Initiative (German: Bürgerinitiative - BI)	Total
2009	5	7	12 mandates

== Places of interest ==
- Museum of Local History and Culture in Geiersthal
- Lichte-Geiersthal School of Design (founded 1862), in the holiday centre of Lichte-Geiersthal, close to the Feldbachtal Forest Hotel
- Wallendorf Protestant church, built in 1733 in country baroque style
- Piesau viaduct (length 258 m, height 34 m, 10 arches), crossing the Piesau and federal highway 281

== Annual events ==
- Porcelain Market with coronation of the Porcelain Princess, last weekend in July
- Porcelain Christmas, first day of Advent
- Kermesse (German: Kirchweihfest) – the Lichte Kermesse is the oldest event in Lichte. It is based on a permission granted by the sovereign in 1825 to hold an annual fair on Michaelmas (September 29).

== Economy and infrastructure ==
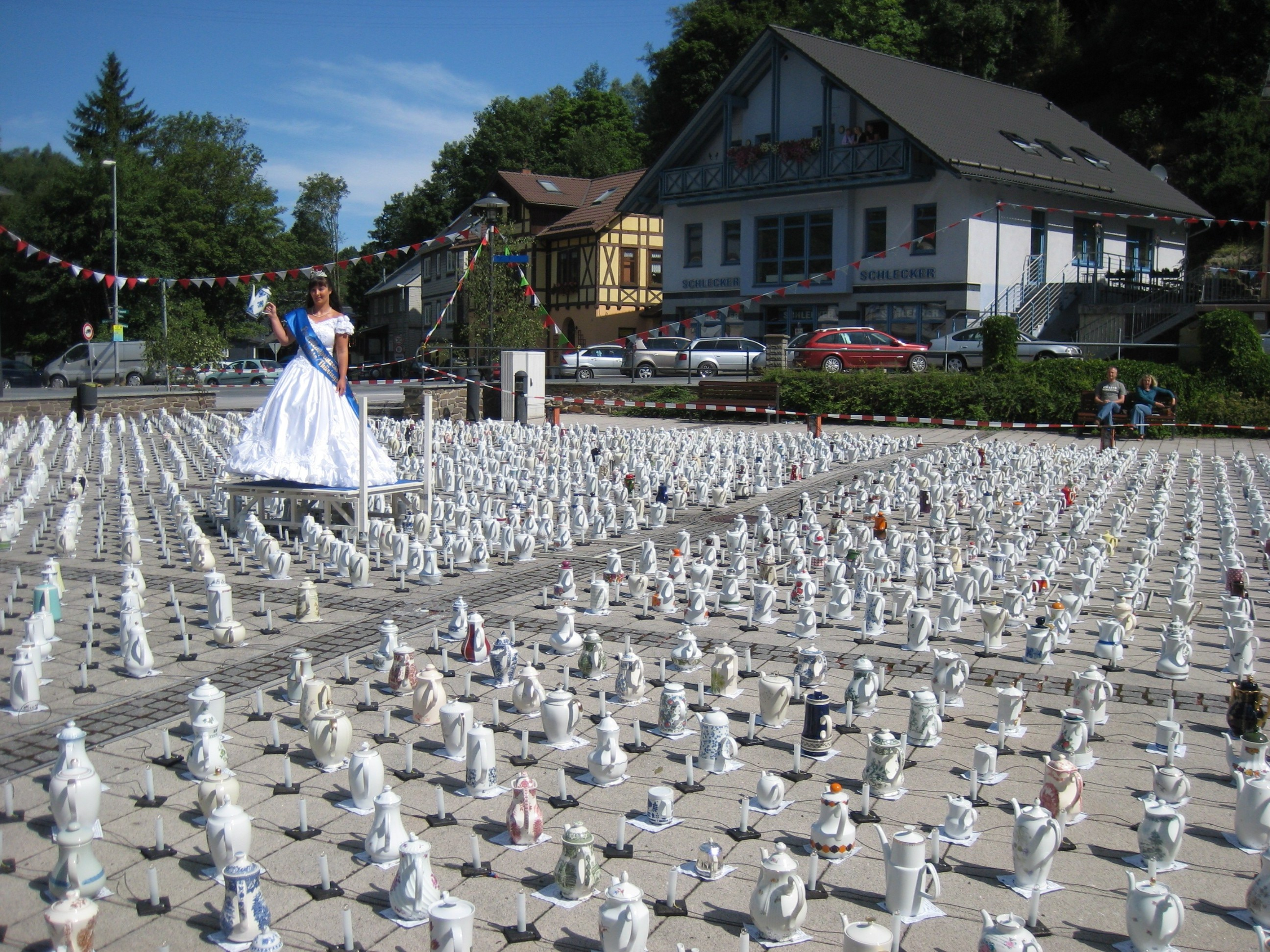
Porcelain Princess with 3,000 coffee- and tea-pots, on the occasion of a porcelain show in 2010.

The local economy, typically for the Thuringian Highland, is based on tourism, glass and porcelain manufacturing, and woodworking. There has been porcelain manufacturing in Lichte since at least 1764; Wallendorfer Porzellan (Wallendorf Porcelain) is one of the oldest such companies in Europe.

=== Local enterprises ===
- Wallendorfer Porzellan, founded in 1764
- Lichte Porzellan (GmbH), founded in 1822

== Notable people associated with Lichte ==
- Gotthelf Greiner (1737–1797) co-inventor of "Thuringian porcelain" and founder of the Wallendorf porcelain company
- Carolus Magnus Hutschenreuther (1794–1845), founder of the C.M. Hutschenreuther porcelain company in Hohenberg an der Eger, Bavaria (1814)
- Johann Wolfgang Hammann, co-founder of Wallendorfer Porzellan
- Johann Heinrich Leder, founder of Lichte Porzellan
- Scherf brothers, Louis (1870-1955) and Albert (1876-1953): porcelain painters, silver medal at the World's Fair in Paris in 1900, gold medal at the Louisiana Purchase Exposition in St. Louis (1904)
- Wilhelm Ulbrich, (1848–1922) regional poet and journalist
- Heinz Schaubach (1886–1970), owner of the Wallendorf porcelain company and Schaubachkunst Unterweissbach

== See also ==
- Cultural monuments in Lichte
- Porcelain manufacturing companies in Europe
