= Neuhaus am Rennweg =

- Town
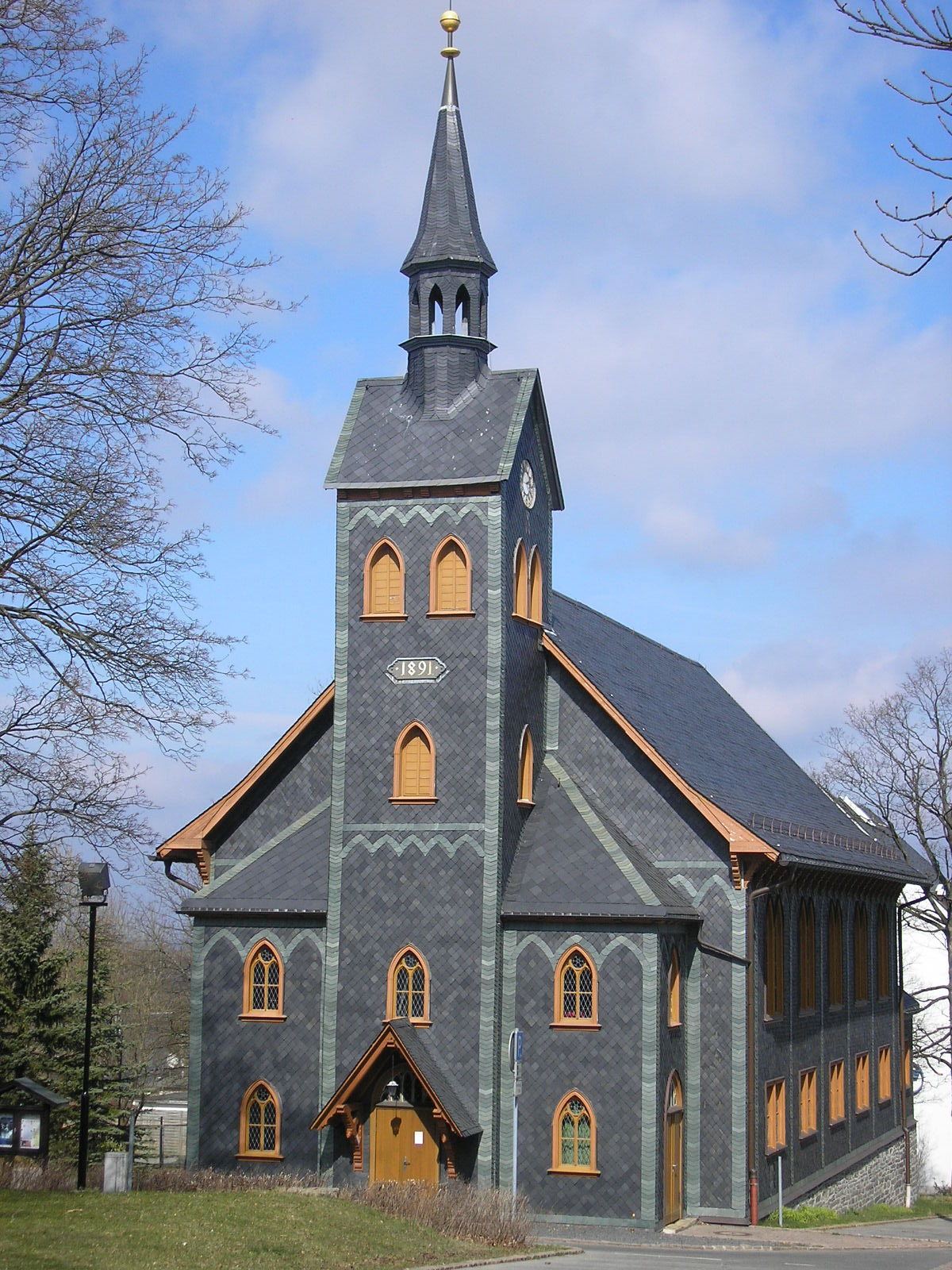
- Church in Neuhaus am Rennweg

- Coat of arms

- Location of Neuhaus am Rennweg within Sonneberg district
- Interactive map of Neuhaus am Rennweg
- Location within Germany Location within Thuringia
- Coordinates: 50°31′N 11°09′E
- Country: Germany
- State: Thuringia
- District: Sonneberg

Government
  - Mayor (2024–30): Uwe Scheler

Area
  - Total: 108.22 km^{2} (41.78 sq mi)
- Elevation: 830 m (2,720 ft)

Population (2025-12-31)
  - Total: 8,468
  - Density: 78.25/km^{2} (202.7/sq mi)
- Time zone: UTC+01:00 (CET)
  - Summer (DST): UTC+02:00 (CEST)
- Postal codes: 98724, 98739
- Dialling codes: 03679, 036701
- Vehicle registration: SON, NH
- Website: www.neuhaus-am-rennweg.de

Neuhaus am Rennweg (German pronunciation: [ˈnɔʏhaʊs ʔam ˈʁɛnveːk], lit. 'Neuhaus on the Rennweg') is a town in the district of Sonneberg, in Thuringia, Germany. It is situated in the Thuringian Forest, 17 km north of Sonneberg, and 22 km southwest of Saalfeld. The former municipalities Lichte and Piesau were merged into Neuhaus am Rennweg in January 2019.

== Climate ==
Climate data for Neuhaus am Rennweg: 845m (1991−2020)
Month	Jan	Feb	Mar	Apr	May	Jun	Jul	Aug	Sep	Oct	Nov	Dec	Year
Mean daily maximum °C (°F)	−0.5 (31.1)	0.5 (32.9)	4.3 (39.7)	9.8 (49.6)	14.1 (57.4)	17.4 (63.3)	19.5 (67.1)	19.3 (66.7)	14.5 (58.1)	9.2 (48.6)	3.8 (38.8)	0.4 (32.7)	9.4 (48.8)
Daily mean °C (°F)	−2.6 (27.3)	−2.0 (28.4)	1.1 (34.0)	5.8 (42.4)	9.9 (49.8)	13.1 (55.6)	15.1 (59.2)	15.0 (59.0)	10.8 (51.4)	6.2 (43.2)	1.6 (34.9)	−1.6 (29.1)	6.0 (42.9)
Mean daily minimum °C (°F)	−4.5 (23.9)	−4.2 (24.4)	−1.6 (29.1)	2.1 (35.8)	6.0 (42.8)	9.2 (48.6)	11.3 (52.3)	11.3 (52.3)	7.7 (45.9)	3.8 (38.8)	−0.3 (31.5)	−3.5 (25.7)	3.1 (37.6)
Average precipitation mm (inches)	117.4 (4.62)	91.1 (3.59)	90.9 (3.58)	63.2 (2.49)	86.1 (3.39)	84.2 (3.31)	119.6 (4.71)	87.1 (3.43)	89.7 (3.53)	96.6 (3.80)	99.8 (3.93)	129.7 (5.11)	1,155.4 (45.49)
Average precipitation days (≥ 1.0 mm)	20.2	17.6	18.5	14.6	15.8	15.7	16.7	15.3	14.5	18.0	19.5	21.5	207.9
Average snowy days (≥ 1.0 cm)	27.9	26.5	23.8	6.7	0.1	0.0	0.0	0.0	0.0	1.9	9.7	23.8	121.5
Average relative humidity (%)	92.8	89.5	85.1	75.3	75.7	76.2	75.7	76.2	83.4	90.4	94.0	93.9	84.0
Mean monthly sunshine hours	48.1	69.4	112.0	160.6	187.0	194.5	203.0	196.8	142.2	98.6	47.6	41.1	1,492.6
Source: NOAA

== People ==
- Oliver Vogt (born 1977), politician
