= Municipal association =

Associations of city or town govts

A municipal association, also called municipal league or local government association, is an organization made of municipal governments. They perform advocacy to higher-level governments. They also provide various public services more cheaply than it would take for each city or town to provide the services themselves.

== List and types ==
- Municipal association (Germany), in German: Verwaltungsgemeinschaften
- Municipal association (Austria)
- National League of Cities, United States

== See also ==
- List of councils of government
