= Kieselbach (Lichte) =

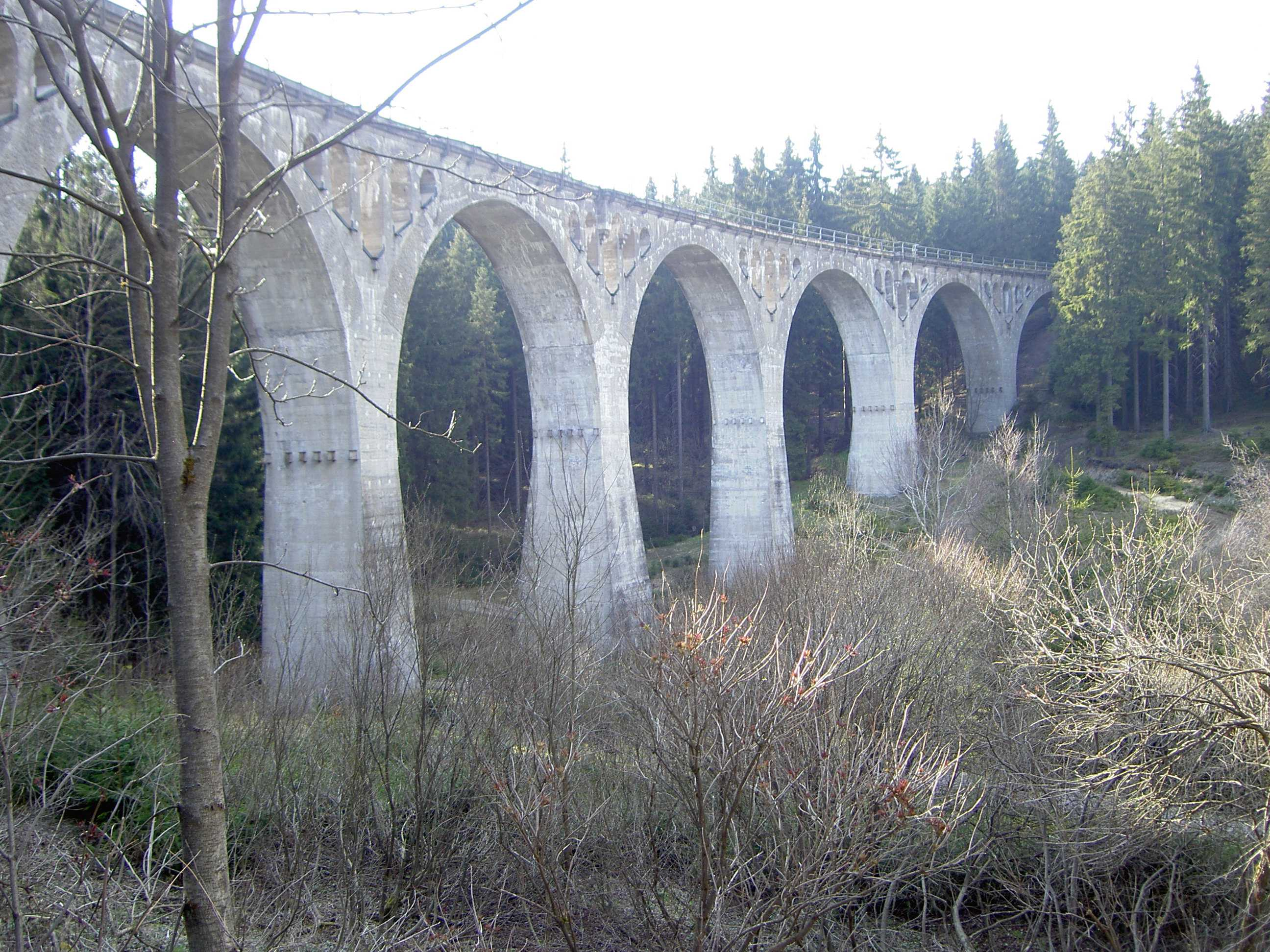
- Rail viaduct over the Kieselbach in the valley Finsterer Grund

Location
- Country: Germany
- State: Thuringia

Physical characteristics
- Source
  - location: Ernstthal
  - coordinates: 50°29′45.9″N 11°09′55.3″E
  - elevation: ca. 800 m (2,600 ft)
- Mouth
  - location: Lichte
  - coordinates: 50°31′04.9″N 11°10′38.2″E
  - elevation: ca. 615 m (2,018 ft)
- Length: 4 km (2.5 mi)
- Basin size: 1 km^{2} (0.39 sq mi)

Basin features
- Progression: Lichte→ Schwarza→ Saale→ Elbe→ North Sea

The Kieselbach is a right tributary of the Lichte in Thuringia, Germany, and is 4 km (2.5 mi) long.

== Course ==
The Kieselbach rises in Ernstthal (city quarter of Lauscha) close to the rail station Ernstthal am Rennsteig and the Rennsteig, at the watershed between Franconia and Thuringia in the Thuringian Highland. On its way northeast through the Thuringian Forest Nature Park, the Kieselbach flows first through the Finsterer Grund (Dark Valley), where a now closed section of the Sonneberg – Probstzella single-track railway line passes over it on a viaduct. Finally it reaches the housing estate Waschdorf (western municipality part of Lichte). In Waschdorf it unites with the Little Lichte and follows as Lichte River further the Lichte Valley to the Leibis-Lichte Dam and to the mouth into the Schwarza.

== See also ==
- List of rivers of Thuringia
