= Rottenbach =

Rottenbach or Röttenbach may refer to:

- Rottenbach, Thuringia, a village and former municipality in Thuringia, Germany
- Rottenbach, Bavaria, a village in the municipality Lautertal, Bavaria, Germany
- Rottenbach, Austria, a municipality in Upper Austria
- Rottenbach (Ilm), a river in Thuringia, Germany, tributary of the Ilm
- Rottenbach (Rinne), a river in Thuringia, Germany, tributary of the Rinne
- Röttenbach, a municipality in the district of Erlangen-Höchstadt, Bavaria, Germany
- Röttenbach, Roth, a municipality in the district of Roth, Bavaria, Germany
