= Rottenbach (Rinne) =

Location
- Country: Germany
- States: Thuringia

Physical characteristics
- Mouth
  - location: Rinne
  - coordinates: 50.6871°N 11.1652°E

Basin features
- Progression: Rinne→ Schwarza→ Saale→ Elbe→ North Sea

Rottenbach (German pronunciation: [ˈʁɔtn̩ˌbax]) is a river of Thuringia, Germany. It flows into the Rinne in the village Rottenbach.

== See also ==
- List of rivers of Thuringia
