= Elschnitztalbach =

Location
- Country: Germany
- State: Thuringia

Physical characteristics
- Mouth
  - location: Sorbitz
  - coordinates: 50.6095°N 11.2196°E

Basin features
- Progression: Sorbitz→ Schwarza→ Saale→ Elbe→ North Sea

Elschnitztalbach is a river of Thuringia, Germany, a tributary of the Sorbitz.

== See also ==
- List of rivers of Thuringia
