= Wallendorf =

Wallendorf may refer to:

- Wallendorf (Eifel), a municipality in Rhineland-Palatinate, Germany
- Wallendorf (Lichte), a part of the municipality Lichte, Thuringia, Germany
- Wallendorf (Luppe), a part of the municipality Schkopau, Saxony-Anhalt, Germany
- Wallendorf (Mogersdorf), a quarter of the town Mogersdorf in Burgenland, Austria
- Wallendorf (Weimar), abandoned village near Weimar, Thüringen, Germany
- Spišské Vlachy, (German: Wallendorf), a town in eastern Slovakia
- Unirea, Bistrița-Năsăud, (German: Wallendorf), a part of the town Bistrița, in Transylvania, Romania

See also:

- Wallendorfer Porzellan, a porcelain manufacturing company in Wallendorf (Lichte) in Thuringia
