= Gotthelf Greiner =

German glassmaker

Johann Gotthelf Greiner (22 February 1732, Alsbach – 12 August 1797) was a German glassmaker. He is acknowledged as a co-inventor of porcelain.

== Biography ==
Greiner was born in an old-established glassmaker’s family in Scheibe-Alsbach, Schwarzburg-Rudolstadt. He was a descendant of the as Schwabenhans well known Hans Greiner.

== Lifework ==
Gotthelf Greiner invented, together with his cousin and brother-in-law, Gottfried Greiner, independently of Johann Friedrich Böttger, over many years of research work, and with a slightly different chemical composition Porcelain.

His entrepreneurship provided the basics for the Turingian porcelain manufacturing. Greiner’s work and those of his sons were connected with the following foundation of porcelain manufacturers:

- 1751 Porcelain manufacture in Limbach
- 1760 Porcelain manufacturing cloister Veilsdorf in Veilsdorf
- 1764 Wallendorf porcelain in Lichte (Wallendorf)
- 1777 Graf von Henneberg porcelain in Ilmenau
- 1779 Porcelain manufacturing in Großbreitenbach

== Sources ==
- Herbert Kühnert (1966). "Greiner, Gotthelf". Neue Deutsche Biographie (in German). Vol. 7. Berlin: Duncker & Humblot. pp. 38–39.
- Gerhard Greiner: Der Schwabe Hans Greiner 1465–1532 - 4. und erweiterte Auflage - Mai 1995 (Familiengeschichte der Thüringer Greiner als genealogische Stammfolge über XI / XII Generationen
- Rudi Greiner-Adam: Der Schwabenhans und seine Nachkommen – Die Gründer von Lauscha und Limbach - 2. ergänzte Auflage 2003
