= Ascherbach =

Ascherbach may refer to:

- Ascherbach (river), a tributary of the Lichte in Thuringia, Germany
- Ascherbach, Lichte, a district of Lichte, Thuringia, Germany
