= Ernstthal am Rennsteig =

- Ortsteil of Lauscha
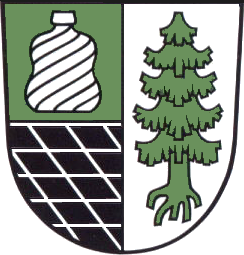
- Coat of arms
- Interactive map of Ernstthal am Rennsteig
- Location within Germany Location within Thuringia
- Coordinates: 50°29′22″N 11°10′51″E
- Country: Germany
- State: Thuringia
- District: Sonneberg
- Town: Lauscha
- Elevation: 770 m (2,530 ft)

Population
  - Total: 950
- Time zone: UTC+01:00 (CET)
  - Summer (DST): UTC+02:00 (CEST)
- Postal codes: 98724
- Dialling codes: 036702
- Vehicle registration: SON

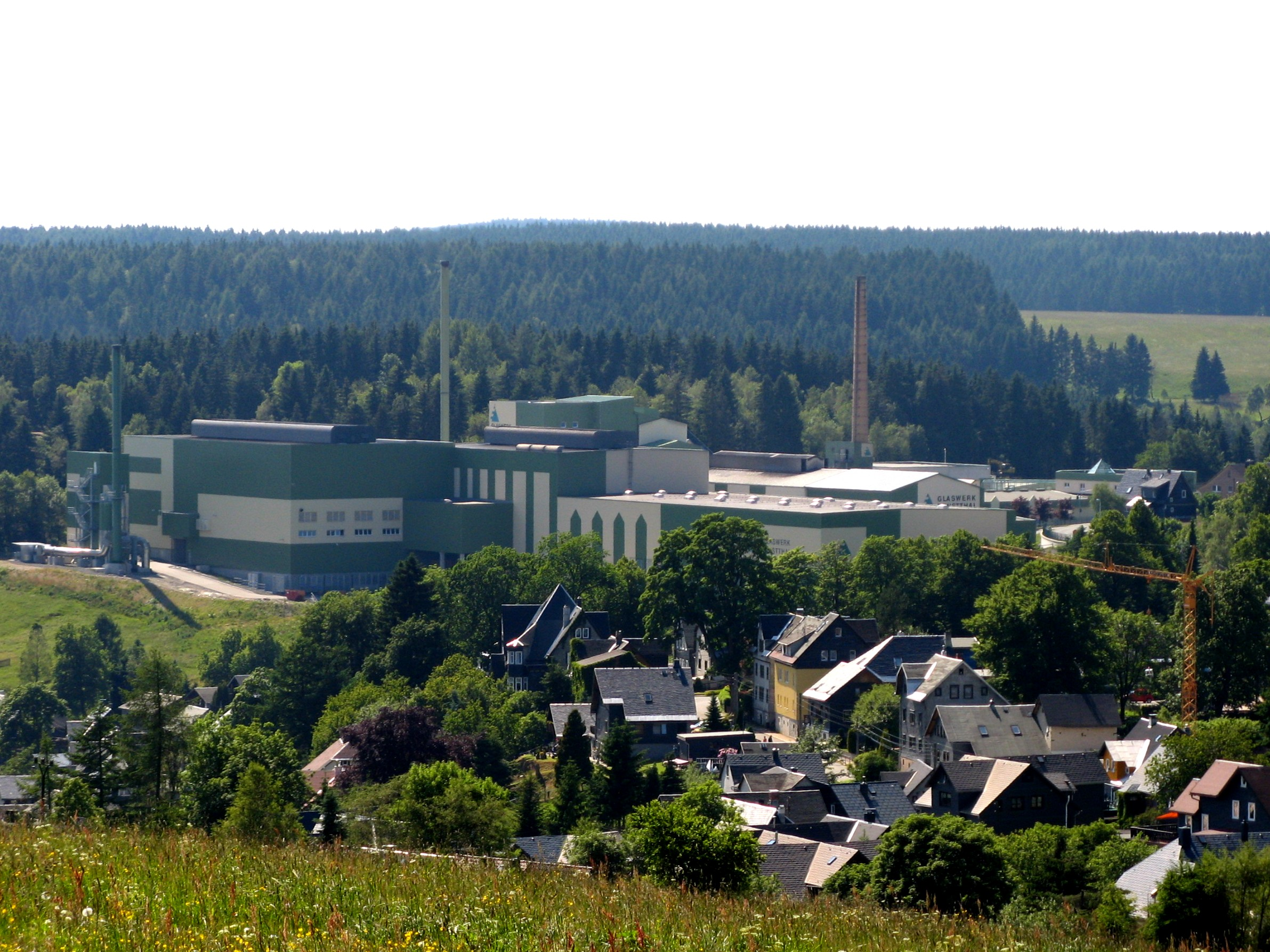
Glass Factory Ernstthal

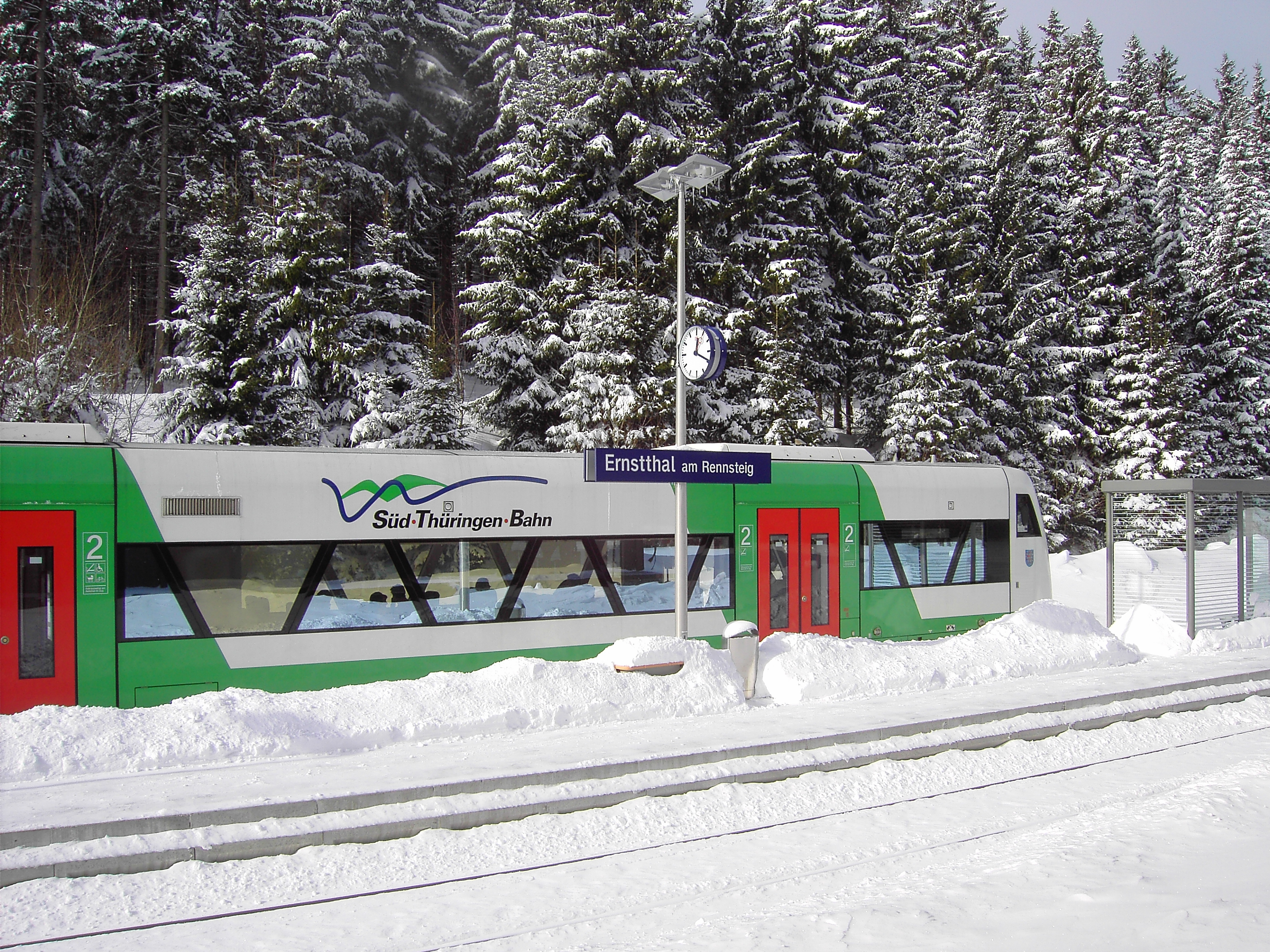
Ernstthal Station with a train of the South Thuringian Railway

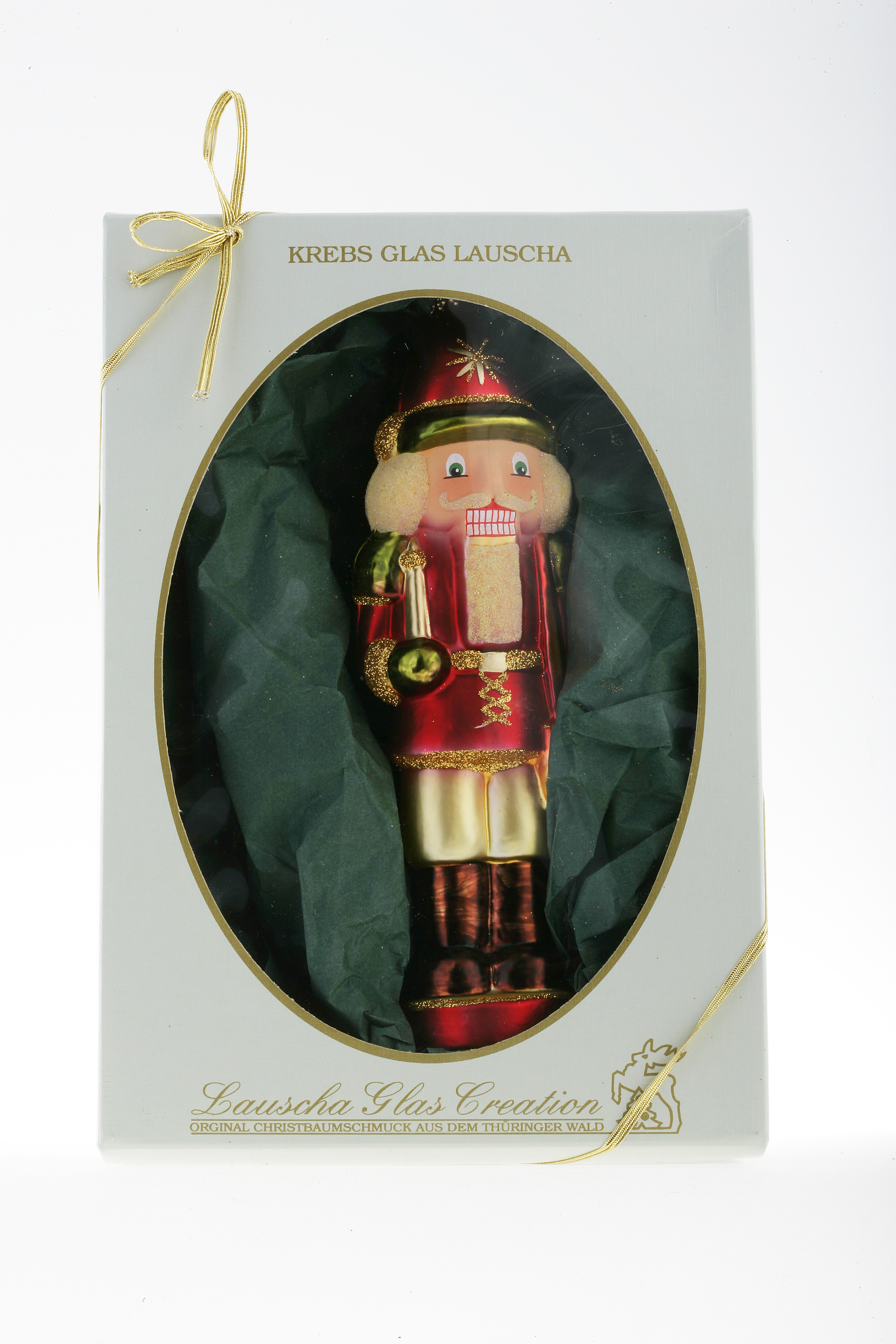
Christmas ornament of the Krebs Glass Lauscha

Ernstthal am Rennsteig is a municipality section of the so-called Glass-blower Town (de: Glasbläserstadt) Lauscha in the district of Sonneberg in Thuringia, Germany, close to the Thuringian Rennsteig.

== Geography ==
Close to the Ernstthal Station and the Rennsteig rises the river Kieselbach one of the tributaries of the Lichte river.

== Famous people ==
- Karl Böhm-Hennes, a successful skier (1891–1914)
- Wally Eichhorn-Nelson, an author
- Baldur Schönfelder, an artist who made paintings of the "Rennsteig"
