= Ascherbach (river) =

River in Germany

Location
- Country: Germany

Physical characteristics
- Source
  - location: Neuhaus am Rennweg
  - coordinates: 50°30′28.4″N 11°08′30.6″E
  - elevation: ca. 800 m (2,600 ft)
- Mouth
  - location: Lichte
  - coordinates: 50°31′05″N 11°10′38″E
  - elevation: ca. 615 m (2,018 ft)
- Length: 4 km (2.5 mi)
- Basin size: 9 km^{2} (3.5 sq mi)

Basin features
- Progression: Lichte→ Schwarza→ Saale→ Elbe→ North Sea

The Ascherbach is a left tributary of the Lichte in Thuringia, Germany, and is 4 km long.

== Sources ==
The Ascherbach rises in Neuhaus am Rennweg (city quarter Schmalenbuche) close to the Rennsteig, the watershed between Franconia and Thuringia in the Thuringian Highland.

== Course ==
On its way northeast through the Nature Park Thuringia Wald, the Ascherbach flows first through the Schmalenbuche (city quarter of Neuhaus am Rennweg), terns to east and follows the so-called Neuhaeuser Grund (Neuhaus Valley), and finally to reach the housing estate Ascherbach (western municipality part of Lichte). The most western part of this housing estate is also called Glanzfiertel which is an indication to placer gold and gold prospecting.

On the intersection of the two municipality sections Lichte (Ascherbach) / Lichte (Waschdorf) the brook flows into the Lichte River and follows further the Lichte Valley to the Leibis-Lichte Dam and to the mouth into the Schwarza.

== Name ==
The name Ascherbach doubtless derives from Asche and Bach (ash and brook/rivulet). In earliest documentary records, which go back to 1386, the Ascherbach was named Glaseseiff (placer gold deposit). This mediaeval naming, in connection with Glanzviertel and Glaseseiff, are indications that the stream was a known source of gold

In fact the rivers and streams in the area of the Lichte valley have been known for centuries for deposits of placer gold and are considered to be the most significant sources of gold in Germany. Recreational placer miners continue to find occasional gold nuggets.

== See also ==
- List of rivers of Thuringia
