= Porzellanfabrik Fraureuth =

Coordinates: 50°42′00″N 12°21′00″E

Porcelain factory Fraureuth
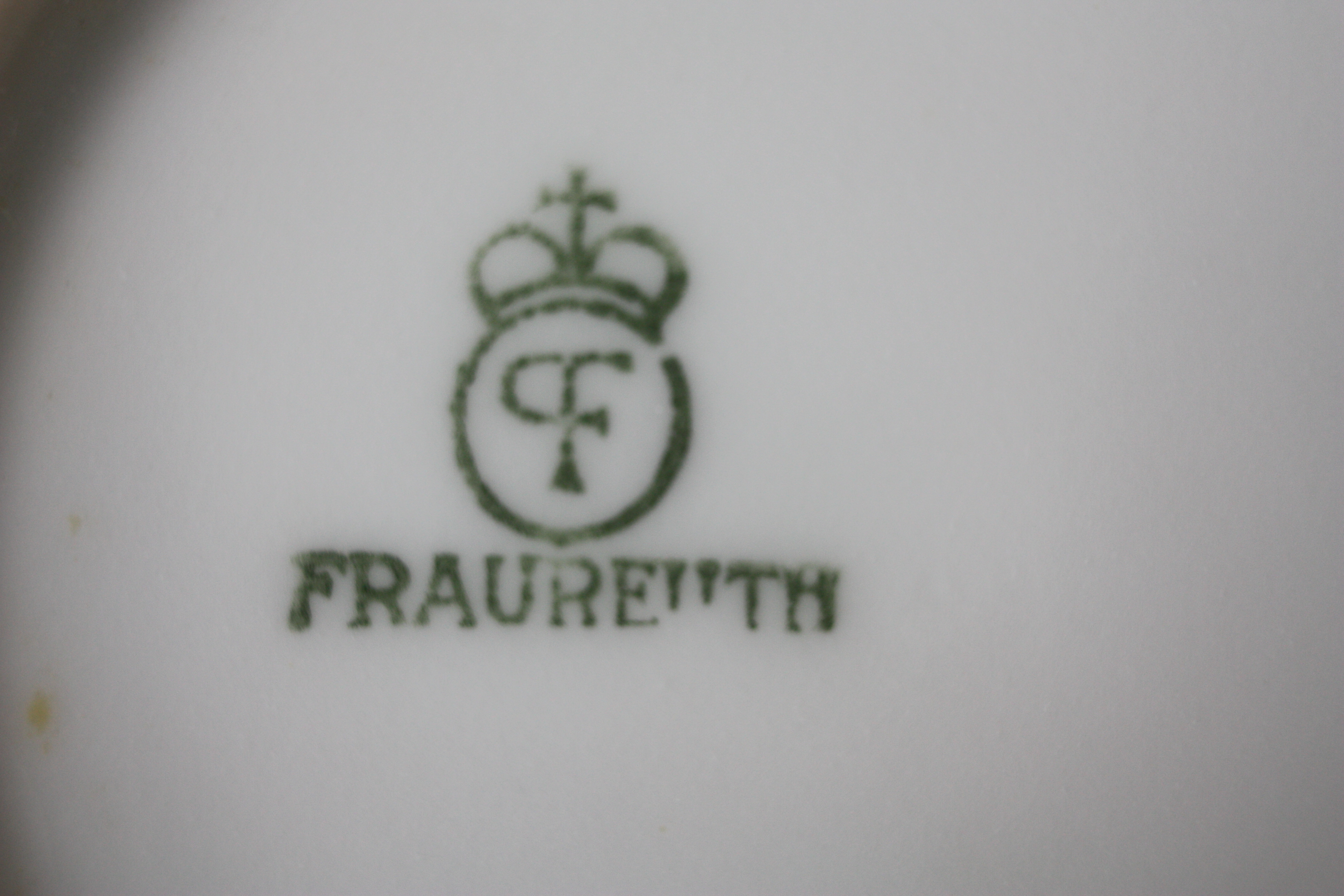
- Trademark of the Porcelain factory Fraureuth
- Founded: 1866
- Defunct: 1926
- Headquarters: Fraureuth, Germany
- Products: Ceramic Art; Porcelain, Figurines
- Website: www.fraureuth.de

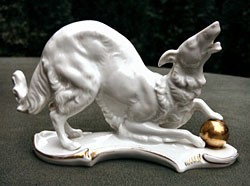
Borzoi statuette Fraureuth

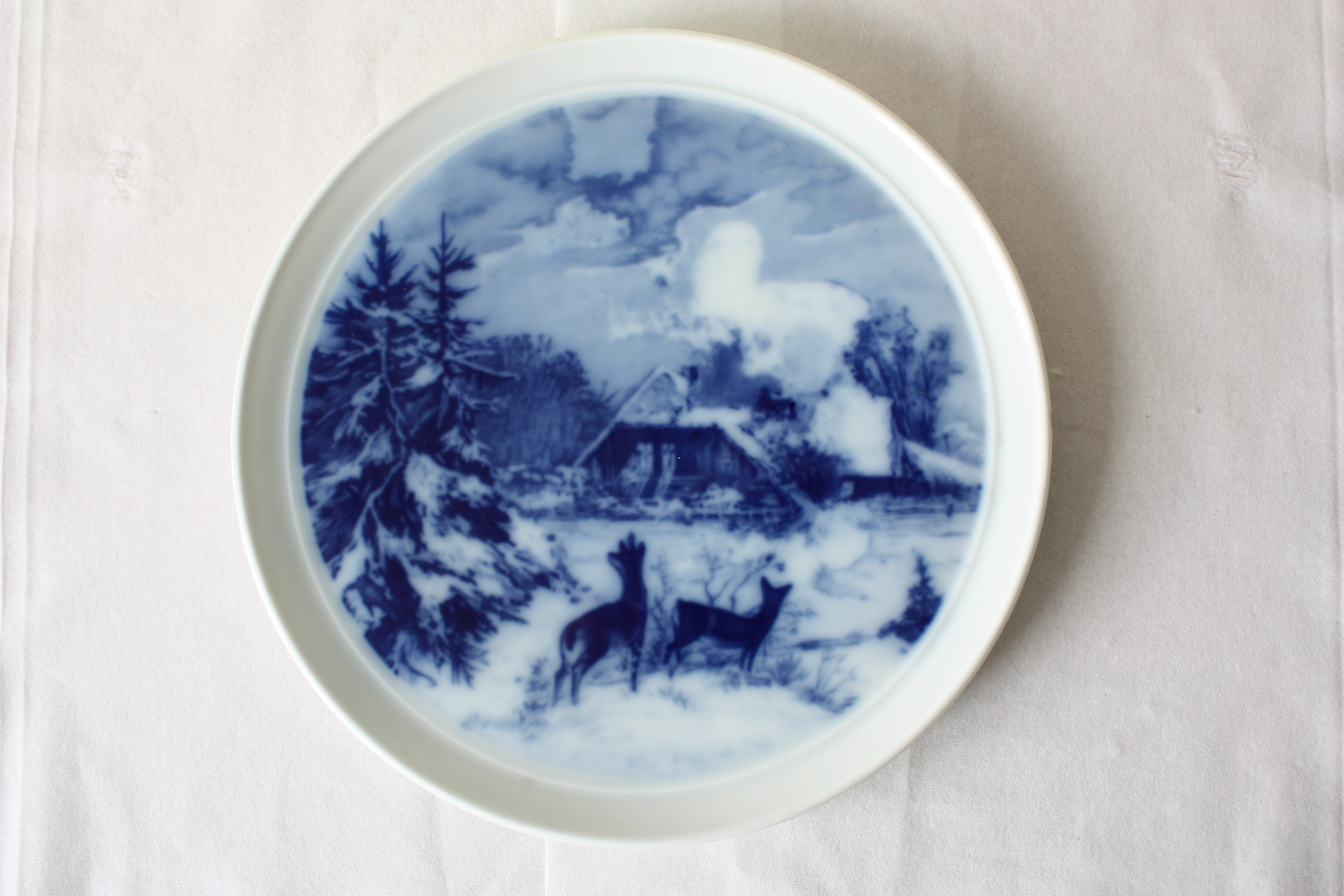
Christmas plate (about 1920)

The Porcelain factory Fraureuth Joint-stock company (German: Pozellanfabrik Fraureuth AG) in Fraureuth was one of the biggest and best standard porcelain factories of the German Reich.

== Structure of the company ==
Porcelain factory in Fraureuth	1866–1926
Porcelain painting in Lichte (Wallendorf)	1917–1926
Porcelain painting in Dresden	1917–1926
Art gallery in Lichte (Wallendorf)	1919–1926
