= Wallendorf (Lichte) =

- Quarter of Neuhaus am Rennweg
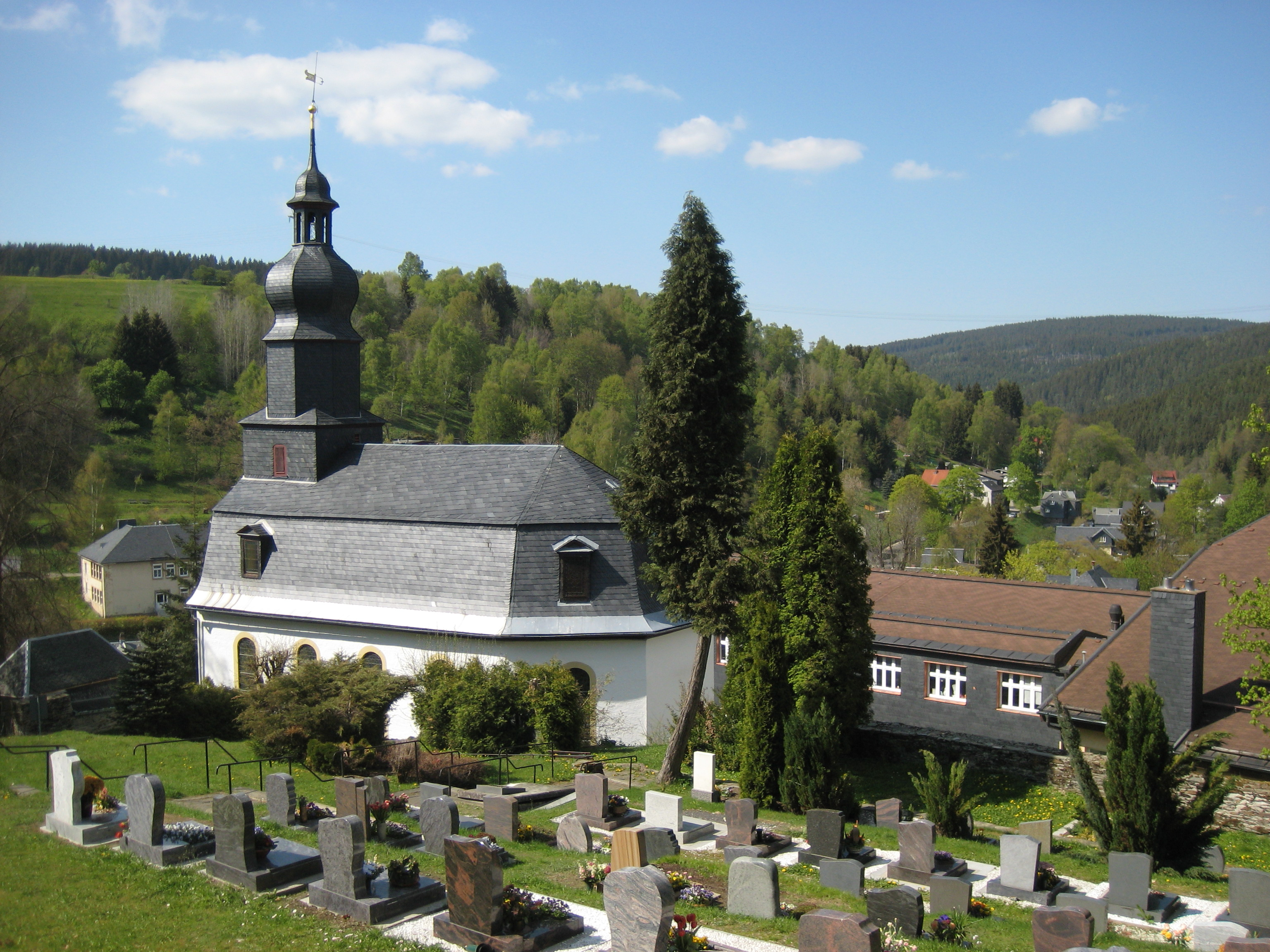
- Interactive map of Wallendorf
- Location within Germany Location within Thuringia
- Coordinates: 50°31′34″N 11°11′34″E
- Country: Germany
- State: Thuringia
- District: Sonneberg
- Town: Neuhaus am Rennweg
- Elevation: 580 m (1,900 ft)
- Time zone: UTC+01:00 (CET)
  - Summer (DST): UTC+02:00 (CEST)
- Postal codes: 98739
- Dialling codes: 036701
- Vehicle registration: SON, NH

Wallendorf (German pronunciation: [ˈvaləndɔʁf]) is a Gemarkung (part or subdivision) of the town Neuhaus am Rennweg. Before 2019, it was part of the municipality Lichte. It is located in the district of Sonneberg in Thuringia, Germany, close to the Thuringian Rennsteig.

== Geography ==
Th Ortsteil Wallendorf, consisting of the villages Wallendorf and Lamprecht, is located in a forested area in the southern part of the Thuringian Forest.

== History ==
The documentary first mention of Wallendorf was dated December 29, 1414. Lamprecht as part of Wallendorf was first mentioned in a document December 21, 1386.

The baroque Elisabeth's church, built until 1734, was sponsored by Peter Hohmann and his descendants. The Hohmann family was also owner of the Manor Wallendorf. The so-called Gutshof (manor house) and Fronwiese (lord's meadow) are indications of that historical period.

Sections of the Lichte municipality
Bock-und-Teich	Geiersthal	Oberlichte with: Waschdorf, Ascherbach; Hügel	Wallendorf with: Lamprecht

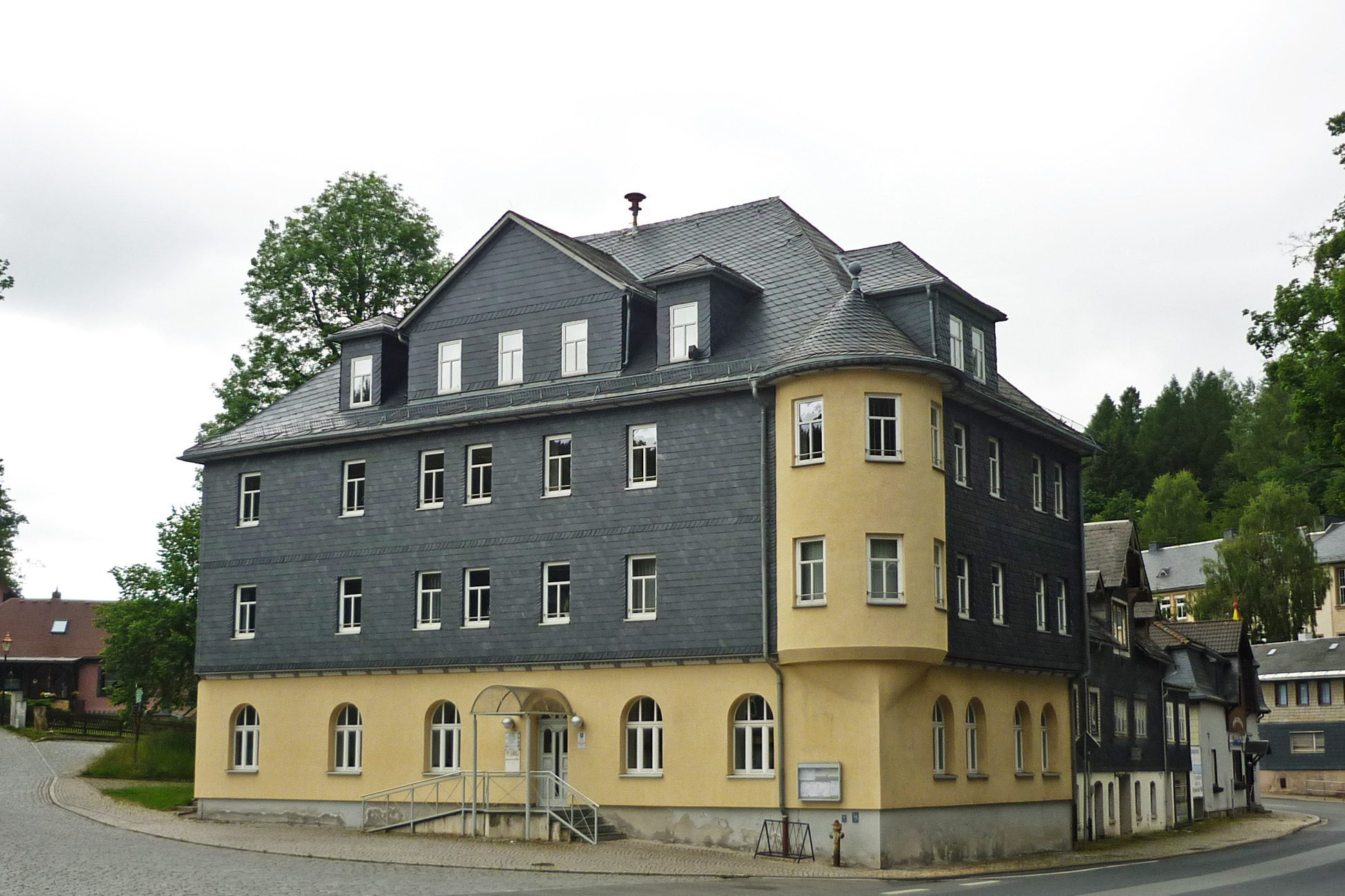
City hall in Wallendorf

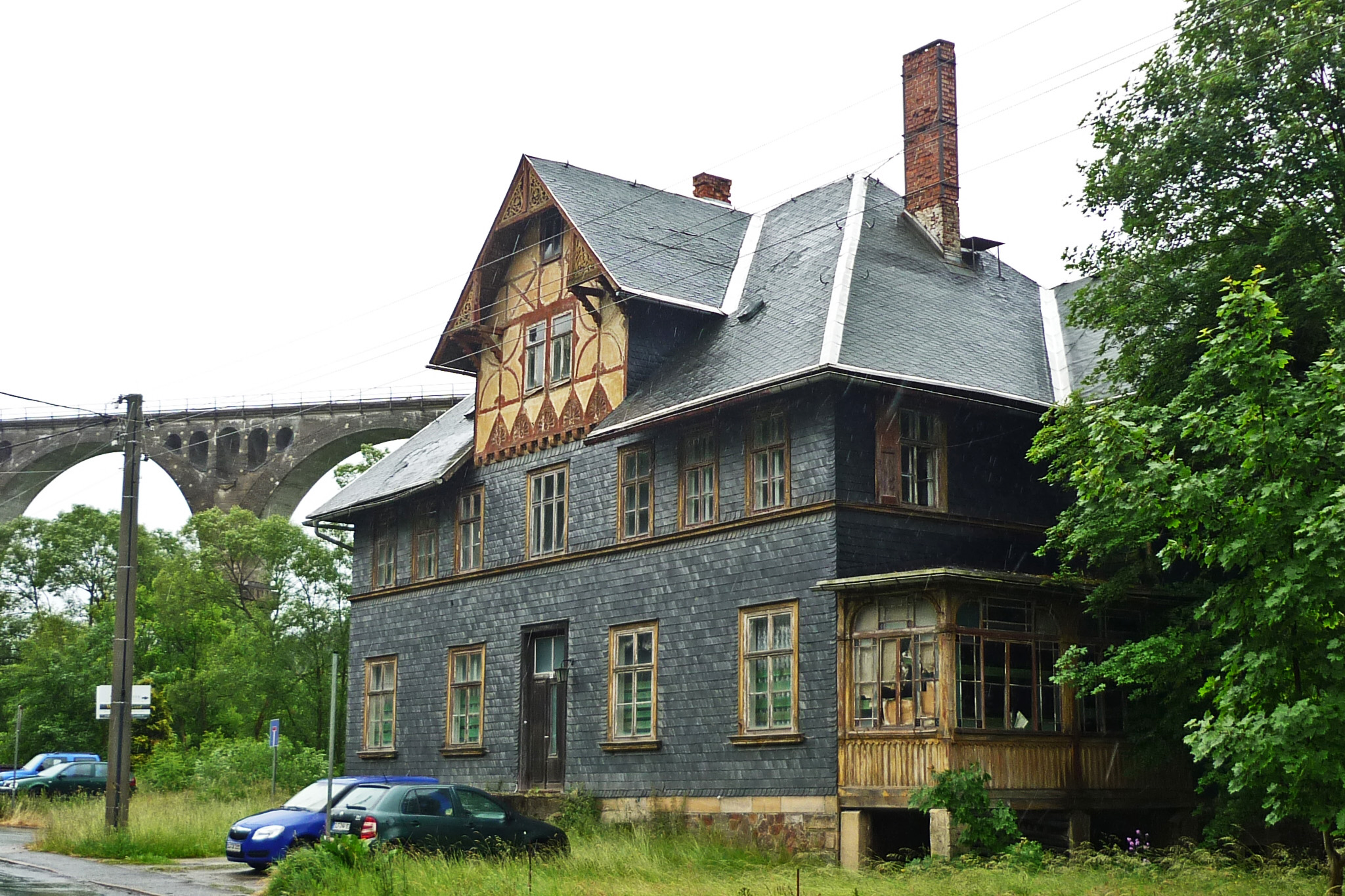
historical "Post Hotel" with viaduct (Saalfelder Str. 32)

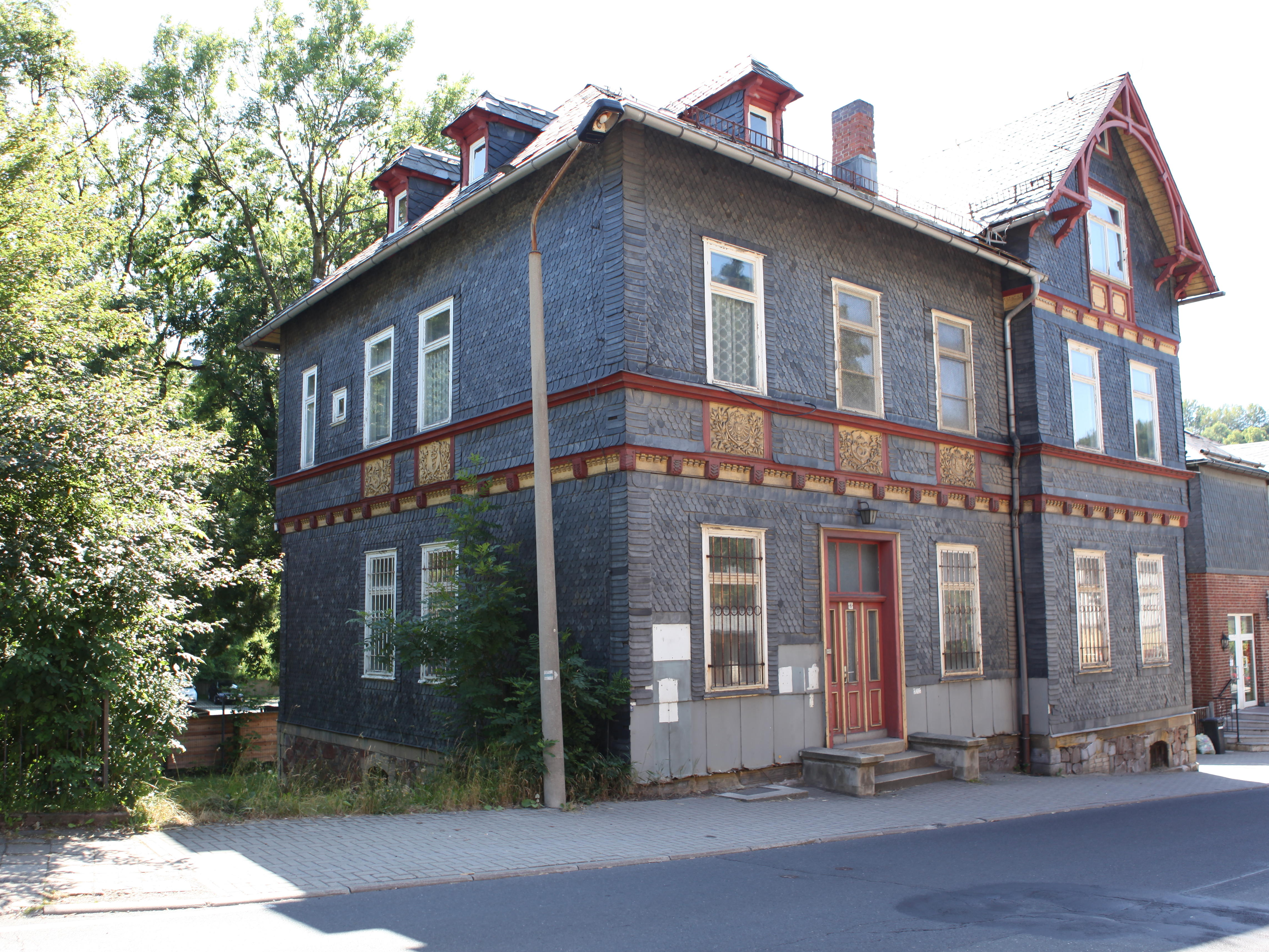
Post office in Wallendorf

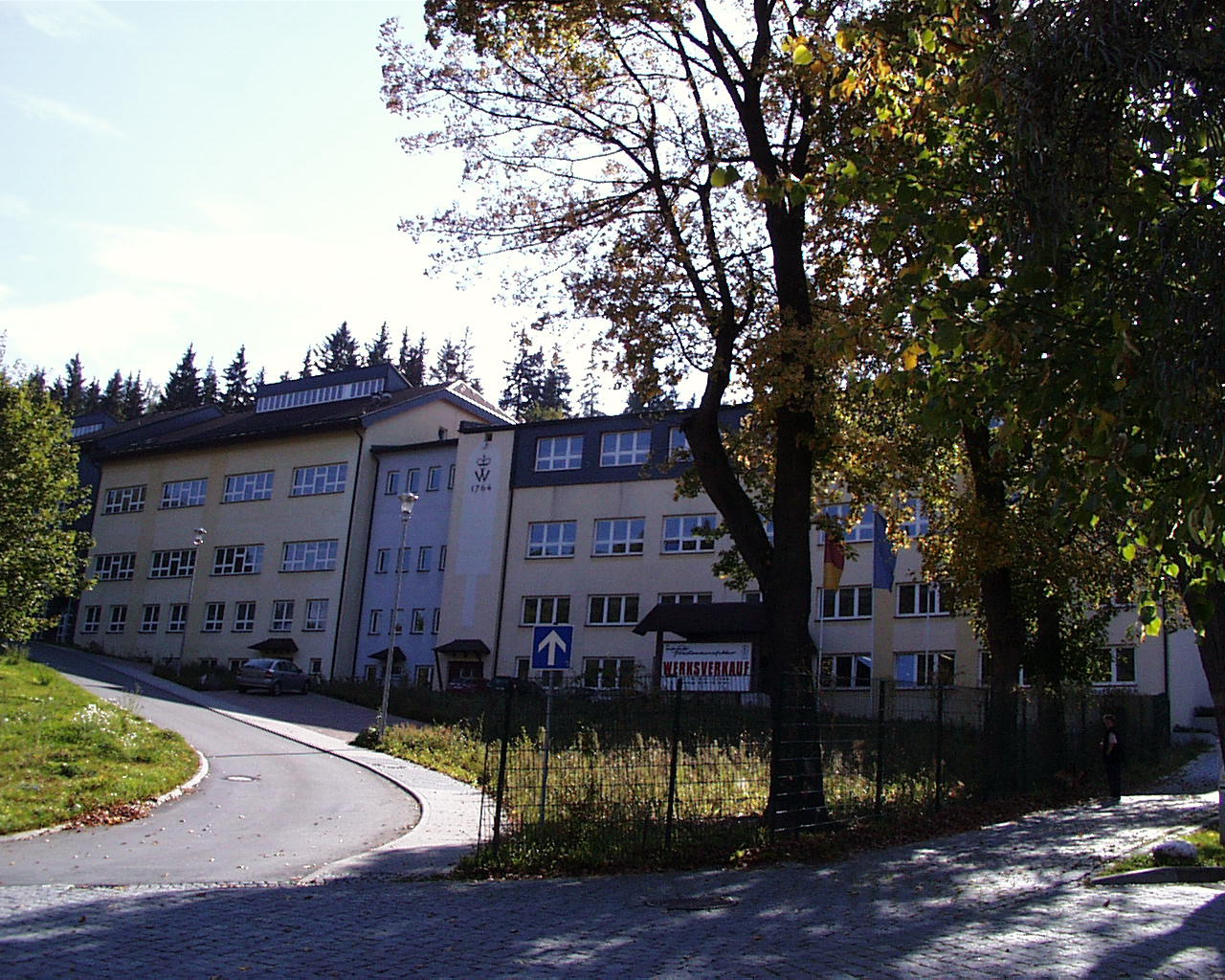
Wallendorfer Porzellanmanufaktur (October 2006)

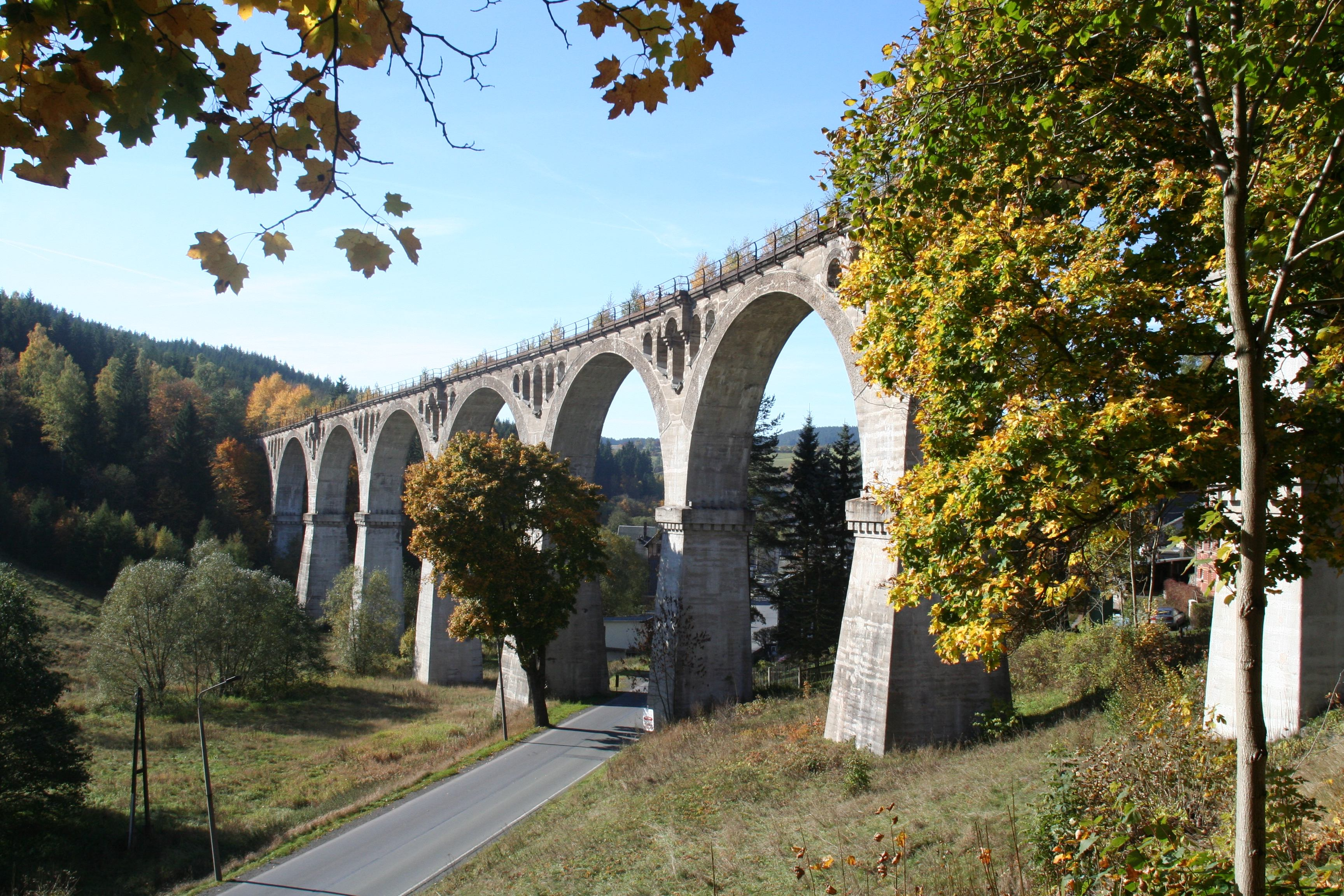
Railway viaduct over the Piesau, distinctive sign of Wallendorf

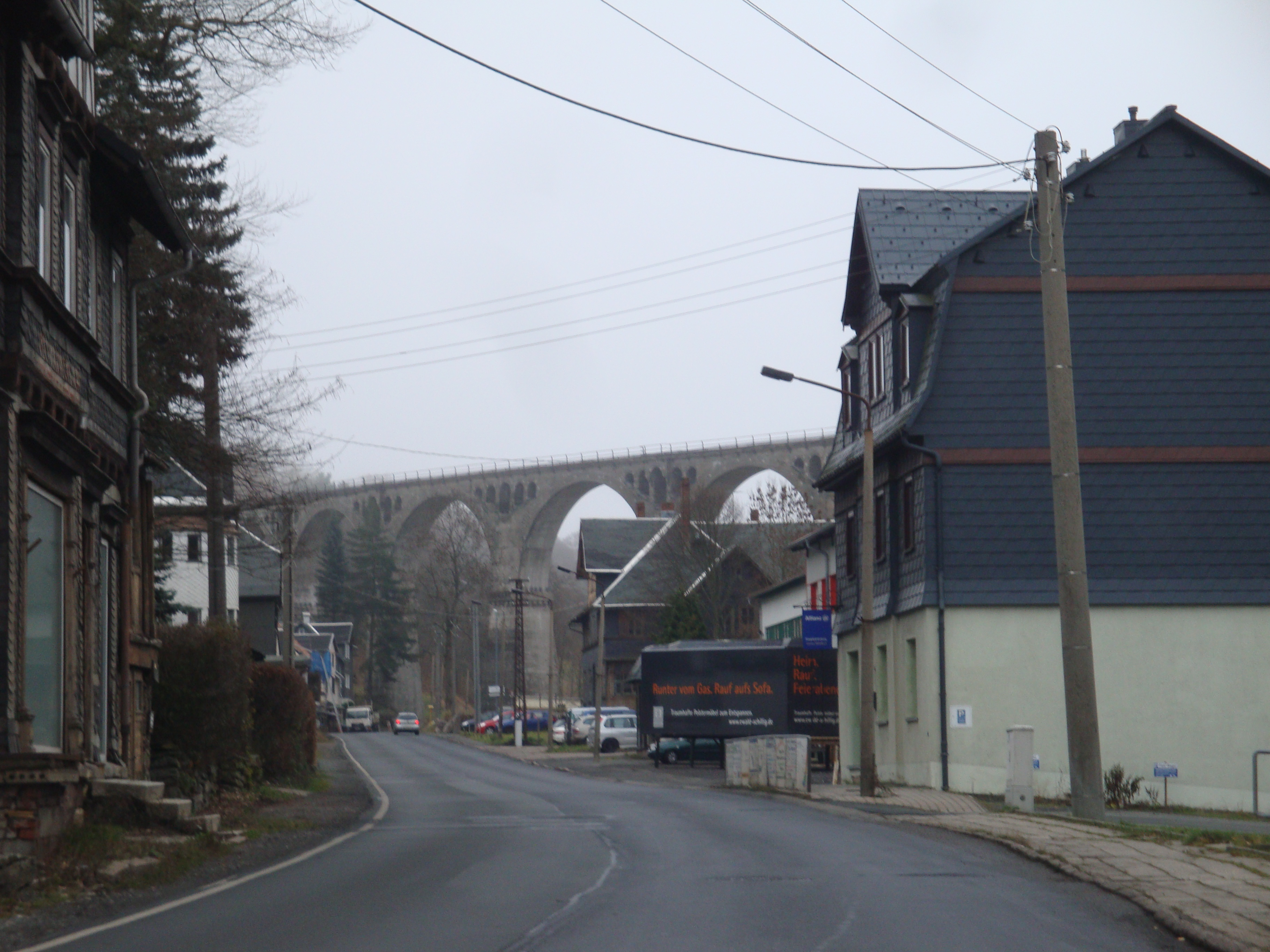
Piesau viaduct ...

== See also ==
- Cultural monuments in Lichte
- Wallendorfer Porzellan
- Lichte (river)
