= Rinne (river) =

River in Thuringia, Germany

Rinne Königseer Rinne
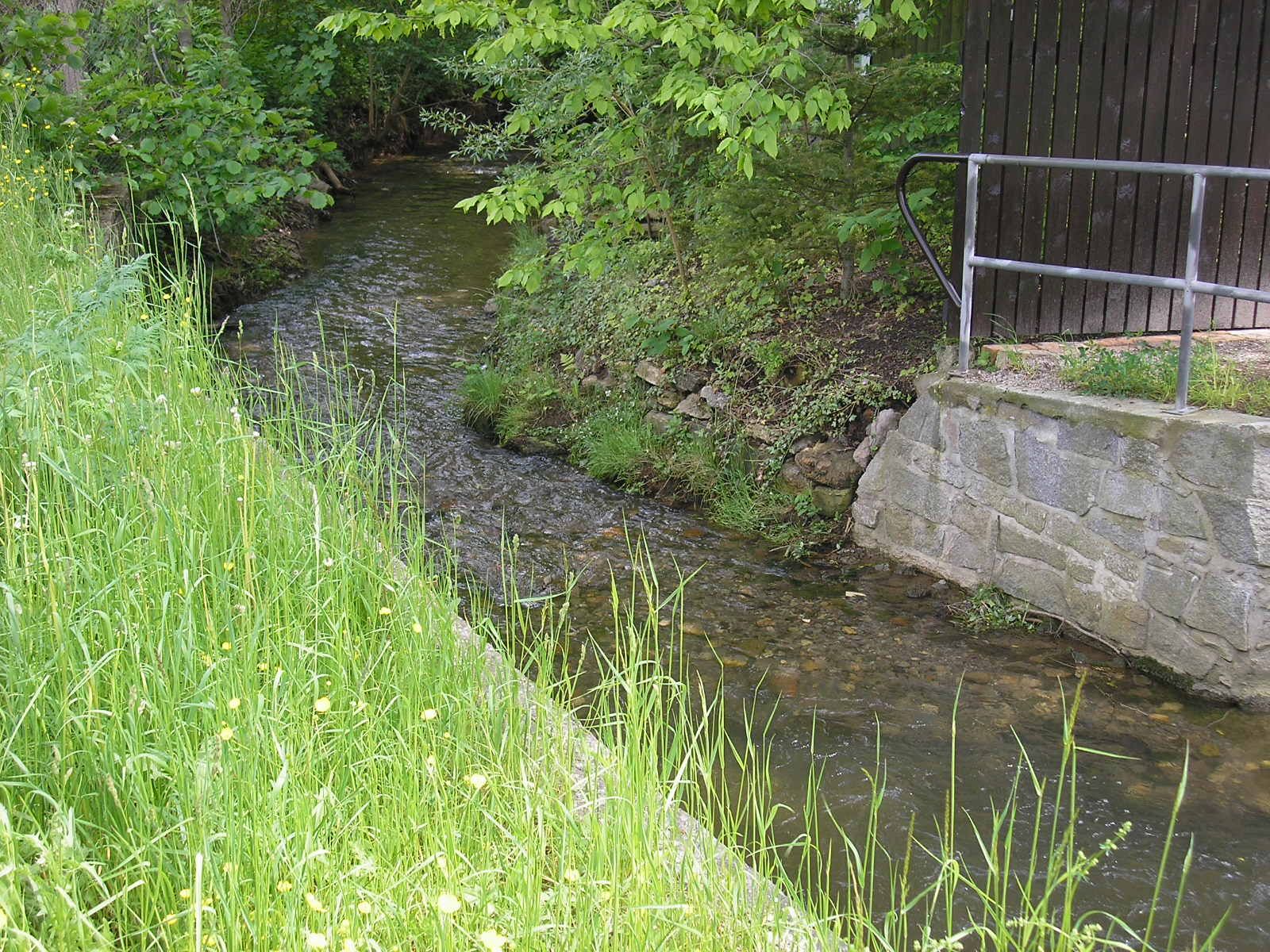
- The Rinne valley near Unterköditz

Location
- Country: Germany
- State: Thuringia

Physical characteristics
- Source
  - location: Northern edge of Herschdorf, Ilm-Kreis
  - coordinates: 50°37′50.7″N 11°03′08.1″E
  - elevation: 620 m (2,030 ft)
- Mouth
  - location: Schwarza at Bad Blankenburg
  - coordinates: 50.6837°N 11.2727°E
  - elevation: 221 m (725 ft)
- Length: 18 km (11 mi)
- Basin size: 124.6 km^{2} (48.1 mi^{2})

Basin features
- Progression: Schwarza→ Saale→ Elbe→ North Sea

The Rinne, also called the Königseer Rinne to distinguish it from the nearby Remdaer Rinne, is a river of Thuringia, Germany, about 18 kilometres (11 mi) long. It rises in the Thuringian Highland and flows into the Schwarza in Bad Blankenburg as a left tributary. Its German waterbody code is 56328, and its drainage basin covers 124.6 square kilometres (48.1 mi^{2}).

== Course ==
The Rinne rises at about 620 metres (2,030 ft) above sea level on the northern edge of Herschdorf, a village of Großbreitenbach in the Ilm-Kreis district. It initially flows north to Garsitz, then passes the town of Königsee, from which its distinguishing name derives. Downstream at the village of Rottenbach it receives its main tributary, the 12-kilometre (7.5 mi) Rottenbach stream, before joining the Schwarza from the left in Bad Blankenburg at about 221 metres (725 ft) above sea level. Most of its course lies in the district of Saalfeld-Rudolstadt. Its waters reach the North Sea by way of the Schwarza, the Saale and the Elbe.

== Restoration ==
The river gives its name to the Schwarza/Königseer Rinne water maintenance association (Gewässerunterhaltungsverband Schwarza/Königseer Rinne), which is responsible for the upkeep of watercourses in the surrounding area and carries out improvement measures along the river under the EU Water Framework Directive. Together with the town of Königsee, the association has commissioned a near-natural redesign of the river. The work, reported in 2023, widened the channel and reintroduced meanders in the built-up sections at Königsee and Rottenbach, returned root stocks and stones to the stream bed, and removed bank and bed reinforcements along open stretches outside the villages, with the aim of improving habitats for fish, amphibians and insects while reducing flood levels.

== See also ==
- List of rivers of Thuringia
