= Wallendorfer Porzellan =

German porcelain manufacturing company

Coordinates: 50°31′30″N 11°11′36″E

- Company type: Limited-liability company
- Founded: 1764
- Headquarters: Lichte, Germany
- Products: Porcelain, Porcelain painting, Figurines
- Website: www.wallendorfer-porzellan.de

Wallendorfer Porzellan or Wallendorf Porcelain is a porcelain manufacturing company which has been in operation since 1764 in Lichte (Wallendorf) in the Thuringian Highlands. Wallendorf is one of the oldest porcelain trademarks in Germany and the whole of Europe.

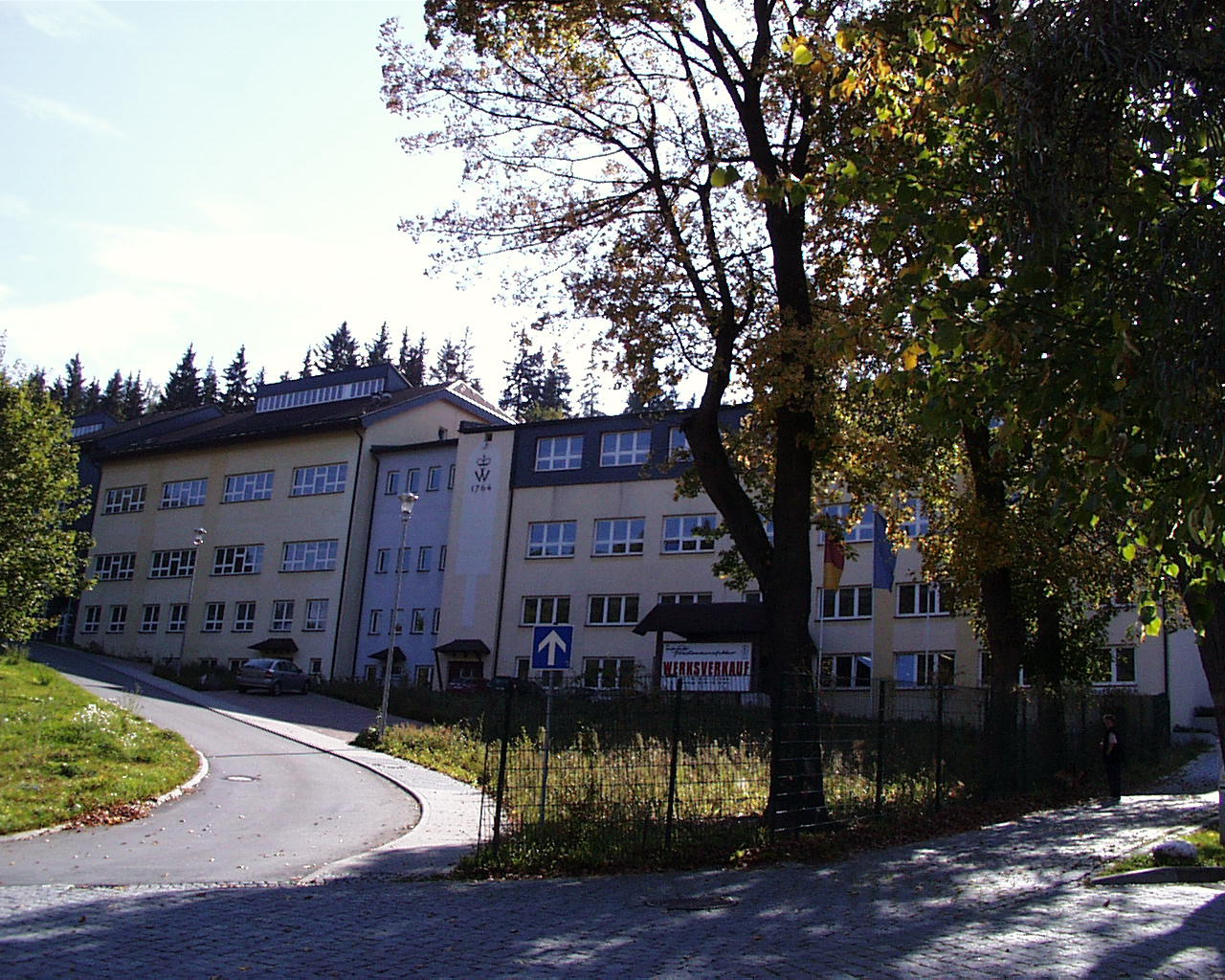
View of the Wallendorf porcelain company in 2006

== Beginnings ==
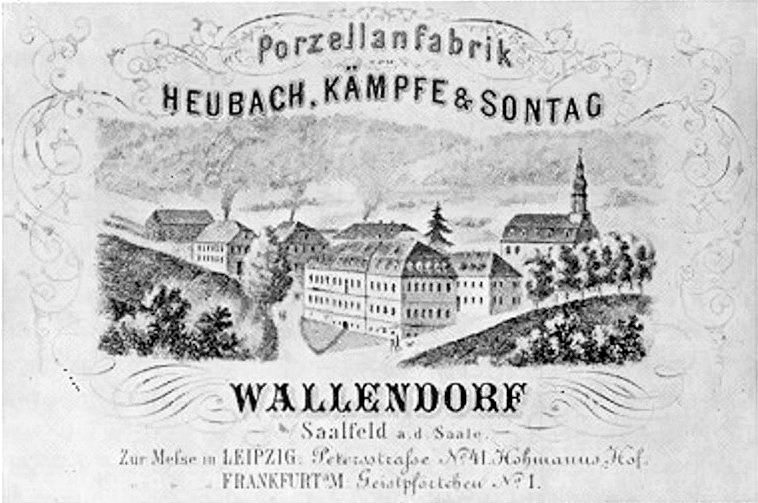
The manufacturing plant in the second half of the 19th century

In the 18th century the territory of Lichte (Wallendorf) was located in two different principalities with the Lichte river forming the border. On the west bank was Schwarzburg-Rudolstadt and on the east bank Saxe-Coburg-Saalfeld.

In 1761, almost 50 years after the invention of porcelain manufacturing by Ehrenfried Walter von Tschirnhaus and Johann Friedrich Böttger, Johan Wolfgang Hammann from Katzhütte applied to the house of Scharzburg-Rudolstadt for the concession of porcelain manufacturing. Unfortunately, only three days previously this concession had been granted to Heinrich Macheleid in Sitzendorf, so Hamman’s request had to be rejected. However, he did not give up his dream. One year later he was able to fire hard-paste porcelain in Katzhütte, and one year after that he purchased the Baron Hohental manor in Lichte on the Saxe-Coburg-Saalfeld bank of the river.

Finally the Duke of Saxe-Coburg granted Hammann his porcelain manufacturing concession, and in 1764, together with Gotthelf Greiner and his cousin Gottfried Greiner, he founded the porcelain manufacturing company in Lichte (Wallendorf). Consequently the trademark Wallendorf porcelain, one of the oldest porcelain trademarks in Europe, was established.

== Early work ==
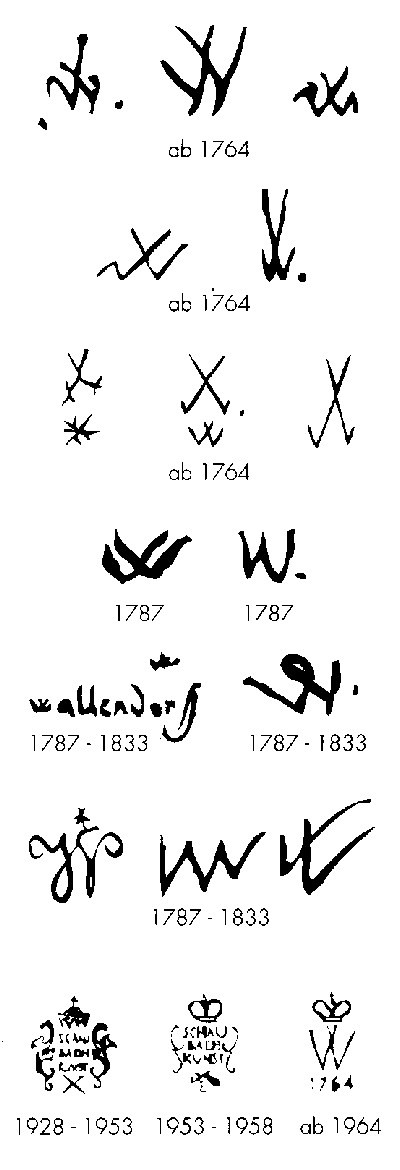
Trademarks – Wallendorf porcelain

Originally, Wallendorf porcelain was manufactured using local raw materials. This was the main reason for unclean and toned porcelain. However, by 1780 Bohemian kaolin was being used, resulting in snow-white hard-paste porcelain. According to the expert Wilhelm Martius in 1793, "Wallendorf porcelain is now brilliant white, . . . beautifully painted and so hard, that even sparks are emitted by friction on steel".

Until 1833 the company remained in the hands of Hammann’s family. The turbulent years after that were characterised by often changing ownership. Among famous names—indications of porcelain tradition and quality even today—can be found Hutschenreuther, Kämpfe, Sonntag, Heubach, Fraureuth, and Schaubach. The changes in ownership and the economic up and downs were reflected in changes intrademarks. In this time imitations of the Meissen porcelain trademark were noticed and were the subject of complaints to the Electoral Saxe-Coburg Land Authority. Today’s trademark of the letter W below a crown and the foundation year of 1764 was introduced 200 years after the foundation of Wallendorf porcelain.

== Traditions and developments ==
The typical character of Wallendorf porcelain has survived for almost two and a half centuries until today. In 1764 production started with handmade coffee, tea and chocolate services; in 1785 these were complemented by figurines. These areas are still the main focuses of production. Of course, the technology of raw material mixtures and firing procedures have changed. However, the particular detailed composition invented by Hammann has been improved and survived the centuries as a top secret releasable to insiders only. The typical handmade procedures, such as quality management by experts and hand painting, have remained almost unchanged.

== Old Wallendorf art ==
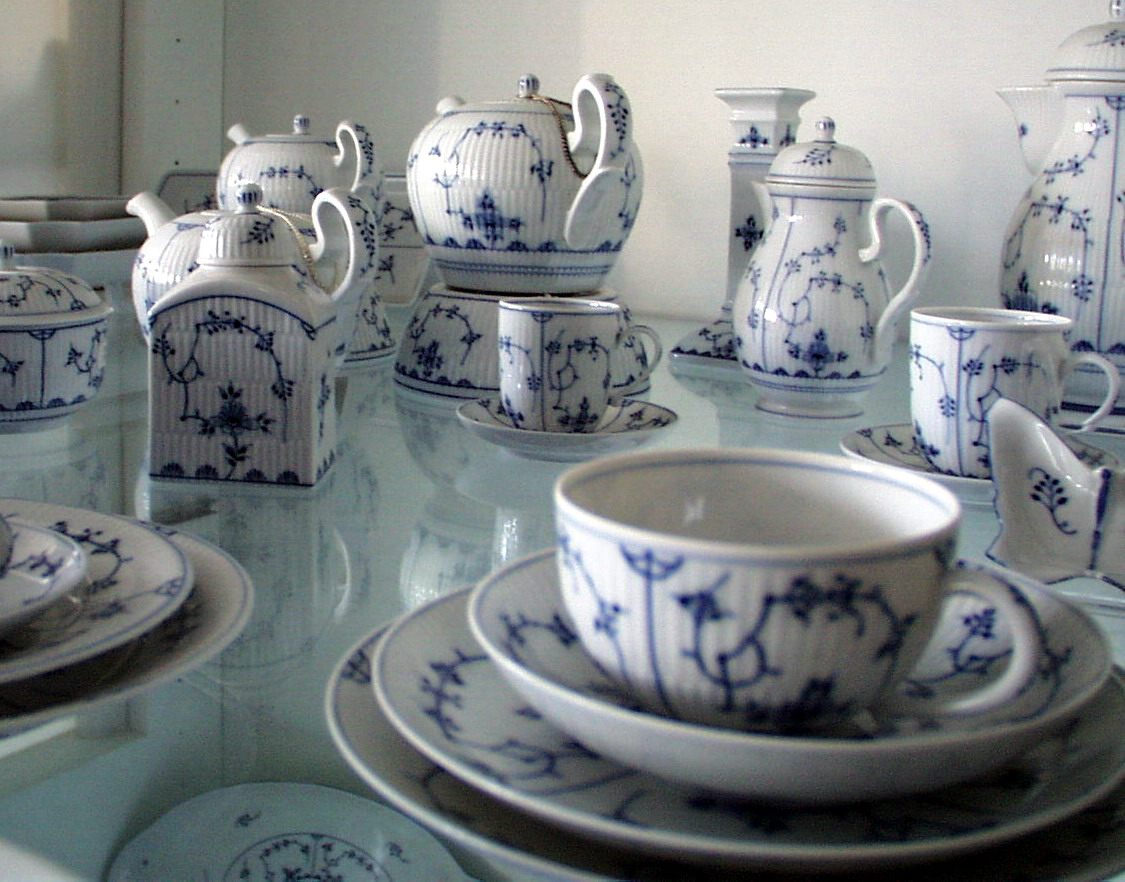
Blue Dresmer tea service

== Porcelain manufacturing today ==
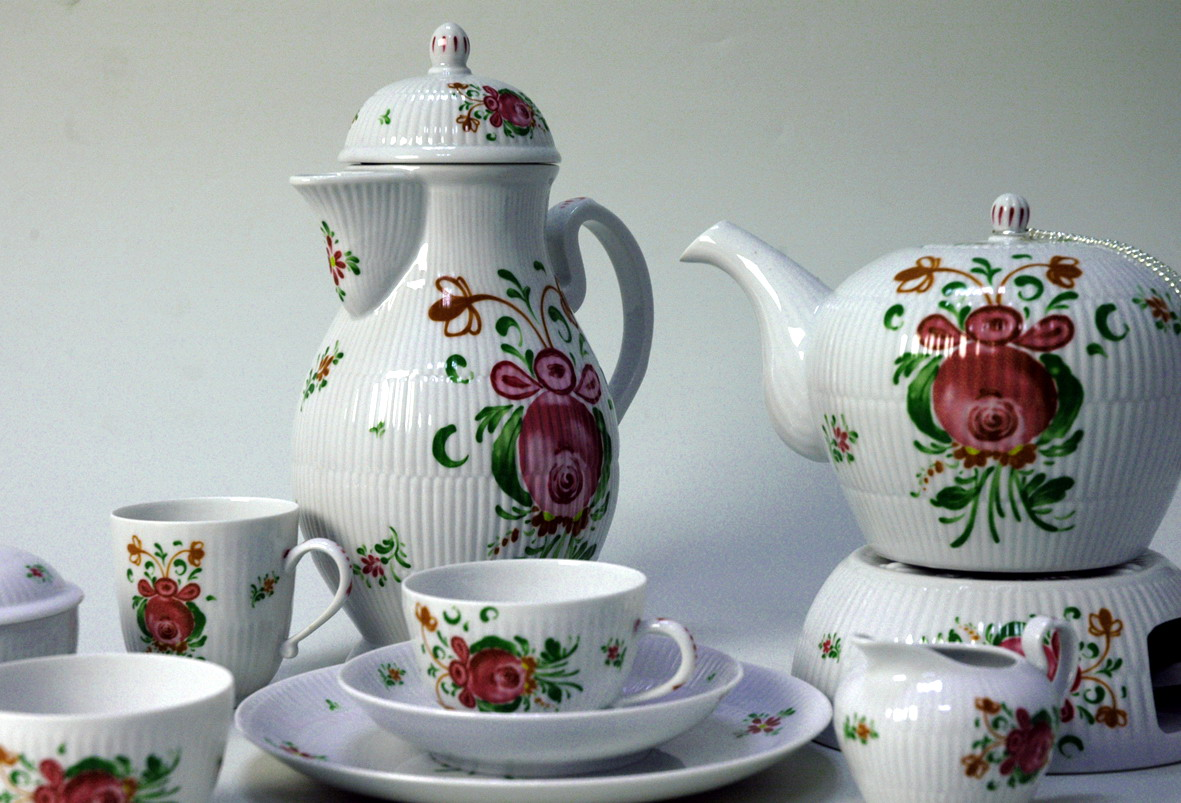
East Frisian Rose service

== Company structure ==
Structure, owners, proprietors, and managing directors since 1764
Time	Description	Owned by	Comments
1764-1790	Wallendorf porcelain		Ownership by the Hammann family
1790-	Wallendorf porcelain	Johann Heinrich Hutschenreuther	
-1915	Wallendorf porcelain	Kämpf & Heubach JSC	
1917-1926	Wallendorf porcelain	Fraureuth Porcelain Factory	Porcelain painting by order of Fraureuth
1919-1926	Wallendorf porcelain	Porcelain factory Fraureuth	Art gallery of Fraureuth
1926-1953	Schaubachkunst	Schaubachkunst	Owner Heinz Schaubach
1953-	Wallendorf porcelain	state-owned firm	Managing directors: Paul Wagner; Hans Habedank
1972-90	VEB Vereinigte Zierporzellanwerke Lichte	state-owned firm	Managing directors: Gerhard Gräf; Bernd Zetzmann
1990–present	Wallendorf porcelain	Limited-liability company	Managing director: Brucker

== See also ==
- Lichte, the municipality
- Porcelain manufacturing companies in Europe
