= Lauscha =

- Town
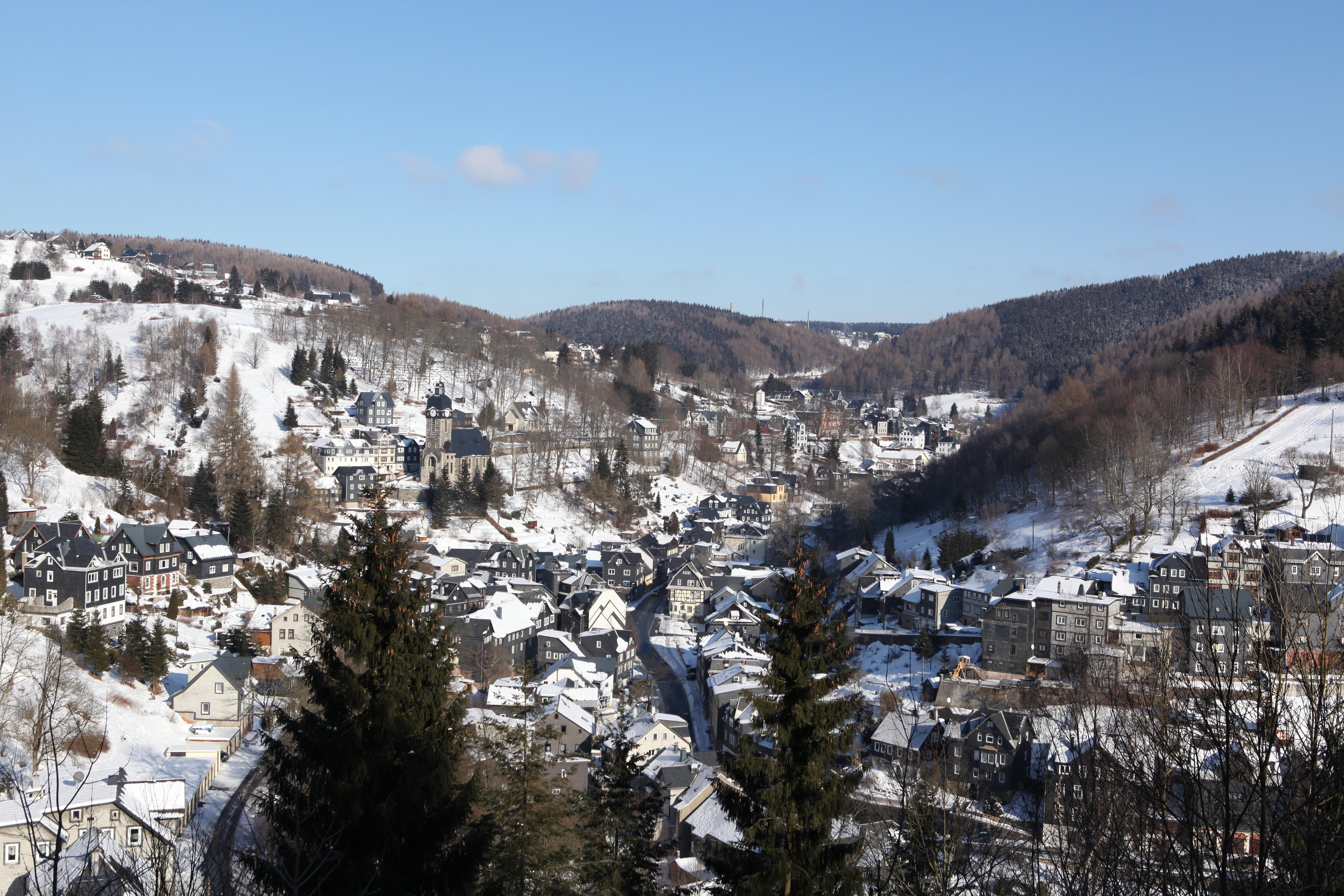
- Valley in winter

- Coat of arms

- Location of Lauscha within Sonneberg district
- Interactive map of Lauscha
- Location within Germany Location within Thuringia
- Coordinates: 50°28′53″N 11°9′37″E
- Country: Germany
- State: Thuringia
- District: Sonneberg

Government
  - Mayor (2024–30): Christian Müller-Deck

Area
  - Total: 18.72 km^{2} (7.23 sq mi)
- Elevation: 625 m (2,051 ft)

Population (2025-12-31)
  - Total: 3,133
  - Density: 167.4/km^{2} (433.5/sq mi)
- Time zone: UTC+01:00 (CET)
  - Summer (DST): UTC+02:00 (CEST)
- Postal codes: 98724
- Dialling codes: 036702
- Vehicle registration: SON, NH
- Website: www.lauscha.de

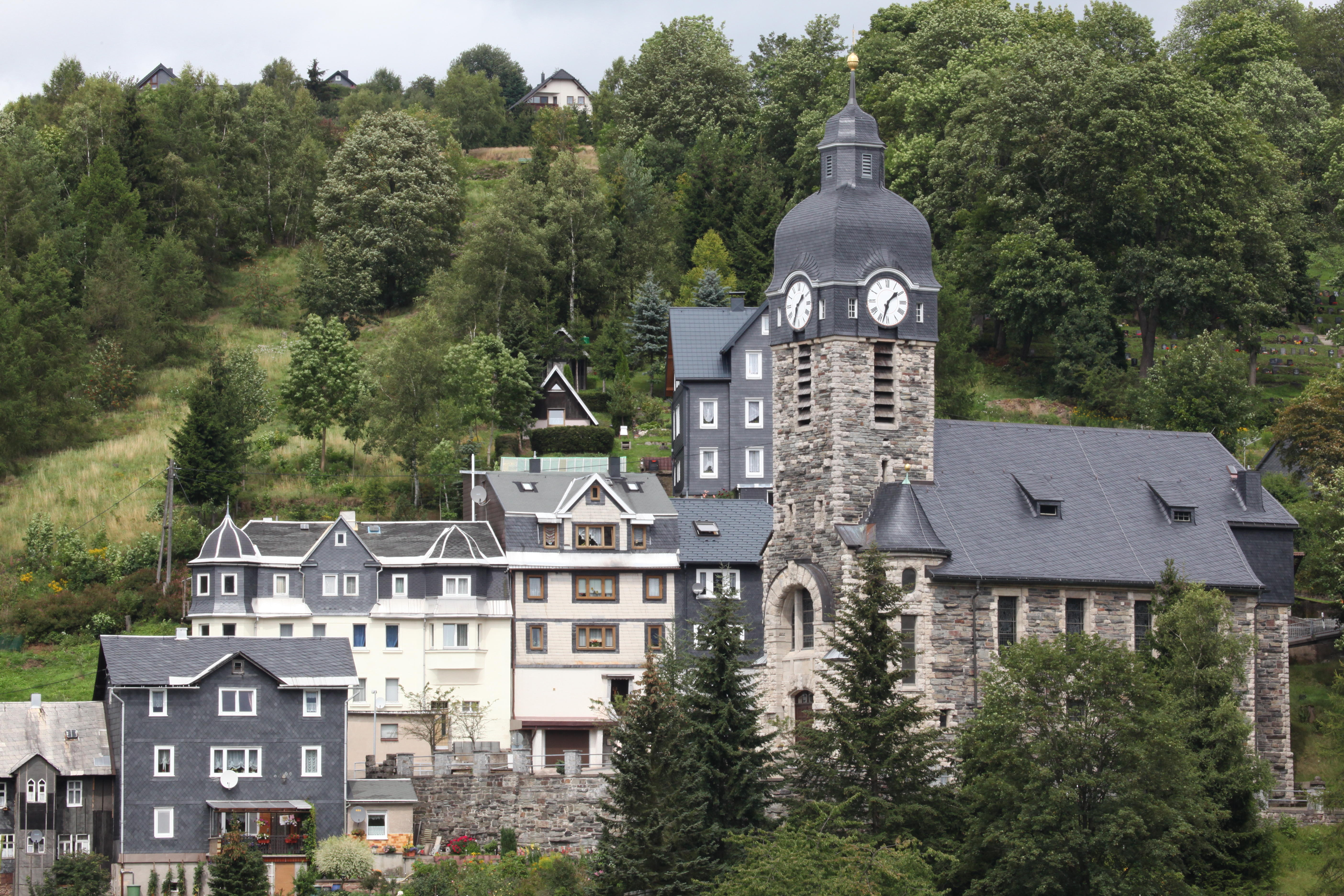
Evangelical Church of Lauscha

Lauscha (German pronunciation: [ˈlaʊʃa]) is a town in the district of Sonneberg, in Thuringia, Germany. It is situated 13 km north of Sonneberg, and 24 km southwest of Saalfeld. Lauscha is known for its glassblowing, especially for Christmas tree decorations like baubles.

== Geography ==
Lauscha is located in the Thuringian Highland. The town is nestled into the steep valley of a tributary of the river Steinach just below the ridge of the mountain chain, the well-known Rennsteig. The main train station in Lauscha is 611 m above sea level, and the Pappenheimer Berg, the highest mountain within the town limits, rises to 835 m above sea level.

== History ==
From 1680 to 1920, Lauscha was part of Saxe-Meiningen, from 1920 to 1952 of the State of Thuringia, from 1952 to 1990 of the Bezirk Suhl of East Germany and since 1990 again of Thuringia.

== Neighbouring towns ==
Immediate neighbours are the following towns and villages:

- Neuhaus am Rennweg
- Lichte
- Piesau
- Oberland am Rennsteig
- Steinach
- Steinheid
- Ernstthal am Rennsteig in the north east is part of Lauscha since 1994.

== Topography ==
The town and valley of Lauscha get their name from the stream, which was first mentioned as 'lutzscha' in 1366. Clean water is one of the requirements for making glass, the others being the availability of sand (from a nearby quarry in Steinheid), natron, potash, and a sufficient supply of timber.

There were five mills in former times, all of which have long been closed. However, some of them continue to live on in the placenames Obermühle, Wiesleinsmmühle and Göritzmühle.

Since the completion of the rail connection and the road from Steinach to Neuhaus at the turn of the 20th century, the Lauscha river has been largely confined to an underground channel. Before that, the connection roads were restricted to the slopes because of the swampy ground of the valley. This can still be read in names of roads like 'Alter Weg' and 'Alte Chausee'.

Typically for the Thüringer Schiefergebirge, broad and almost level mountain tops surround a deeply carved-in valley.

== In literature ==
Lauscha is the setting for the novel The Glassblower by Petra Durst-Benning (initially published in German in 2003). The novel fictionalizes the invention of glass Christmas ornaments in Lauscha by imagining them as the production of a family of three sisters left to fend for themselves after the death of their father.

== Sons and daughters ==
- Eduard Müller (* May 31, 1855, † 1912 in Rudolstadt), manufacturer, commercial councilor, and politician of the National Liberal Party (NLP)
- Ursula Buckel (* February 11, 1926; † December 5, 2005 in Geneva), soprano

== See also ==
- Silvering
