= Deesbach Forebay =

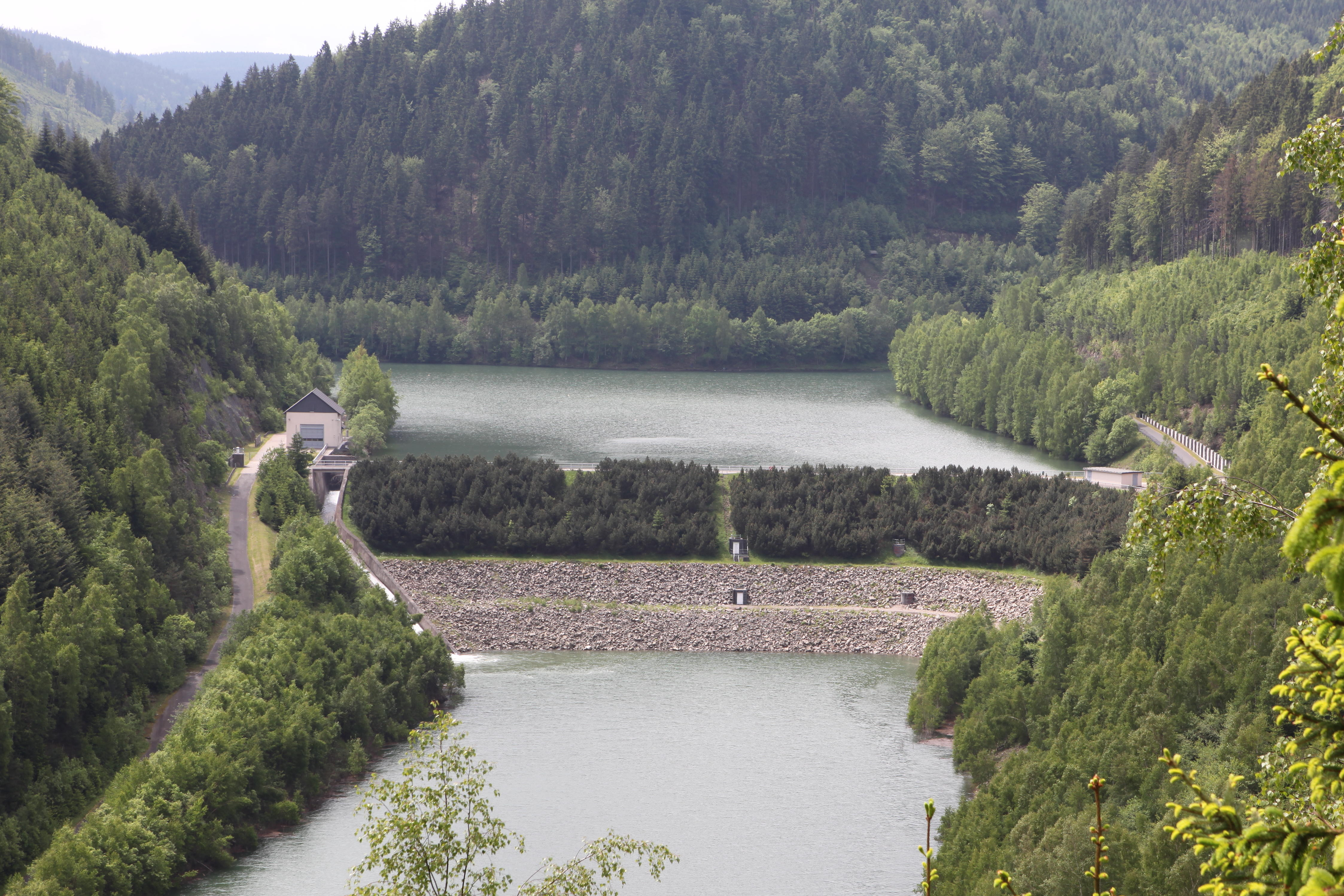
- Interactive map of Deesbach Forebay
- Country: Germany, Thuringia
- Location: Distr. Saalfeld-Rudolstadt, Municip. Unterweissbach, Lichte Valley
- Coordinates: 50°34′31″N 11°10′11″E
- Construction began: 1981
- Opening date: 1991

Dam and spillways
- Height: 42.5 m (139 ft)
- Length: 178 m (584 ft)
- Width (crest): 6 m
- Width (base): 180.6 m (593 ft)
- Dam volume: 13,500 m³

Reservoir
- Total capacity: 3.2 million m³
- Catchment area: 49.5 km²
- Surface area: 122 ha
- Maximum water depth: 22 m

The Deesbach Forebay (German: Vorsperre Deesbach) is a dam in the German state of Thuringia in the Thuringian Highland. It impounds the river Lichte and lies between the municipalities Lichte (Geiersthal) and Unterweissbach. That particular forebay belongs to the Leibis-Lichte Dam (de: Talsperre Leibis-Lichte).

The name, Deesbach Forebay, was derived d from the close proximity to the municipality Deesbach.

== See also ==
- List of reservoirs and dams in Germany
