= Sorbitz =

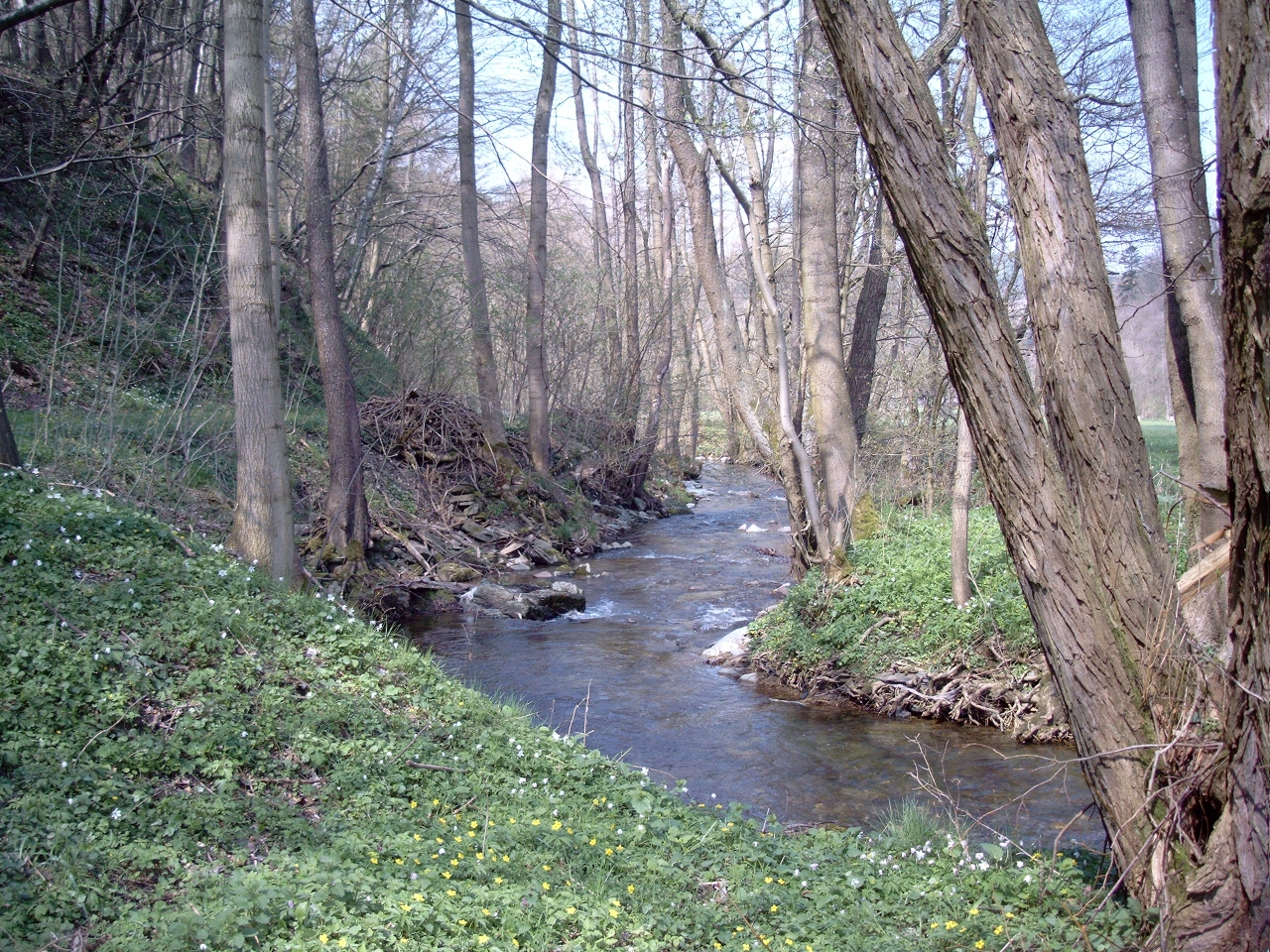

Location
- Country: Germany
- State: Thuringia

Physical characteristics
- Mouth
  - location: Schwarza
  - coordinates: 50.6324°N 11.1791°E

Basin features
- Progression: Schwarza→ Saale→ Elbe→ North Sea

Sorbitz is a river of Thuringia, Germany. It flows into the Schwarza near Schwarzburg.

== See also ==
- List of rivers of Thuringia
