= Leibis-Lichte Dam =

- View of dam from the west
- Interactive map of Leibis-Lichte Dam
- Country: Germany Thuringia
- Location: Distr. Saalfeld-Rudolstadt, Municip. Unterweissbach, Lichte Valley
- Coordinates: 50°36′3″N 11°10′24″E
- Construction began: 2002
- Opening date: 2005

Dam and spillways
- Type of dam: Gravity dam
- Height: 102.5 m (336 ft)
- Length: 369 m (1,211 ft)
- Width (crest): 9 metres (30 ft)
- Width (base): 80.6 m (264 ft)
- Dam volume: 13,500 m^{3} (480,000 ft^{3})
- Spillway capacity: 86.5 cubic metres per second (3,054.7 cu ft/s)

Reservoir
- Creates: 5.6 million cubic metres (0.198×10^{9} ft^{3})
- Total capacity: 32.4 million cubic metres (1.14×10^{9} ft^{3})
- Catchment area: 72 square kilometres (28 mi^{2})
- Surface area: 122 hectares (301 acres)
- Maximum water depth: 91 metres (299 ft)

Power Station
- Installed capacity: 1 megawatt (1,300 hp)

The Leibis-Lichte Dam (German: Talsperre Leibis –Lichte) is a 102.5-metre-tall (336 ft) dam in the German state of Thuringia in the Thuringian Highland. The dam was completed in 2005 to impound the River Lichte, between the Lichte municipality section Geiersthal and Unterweissbach. To that particular storage reservoir belongs the Deesbach Forebay (German: Vorsperre Deesbach). The name of the dam, "Leibis-Lichte Dam" was derived from the close proximity to the municipalities of Leibis and Lichte, as well as from the Lichte River as being the main inlet.

== Construction ==
The Leibis-Lichte Dam was constructed in the time period from 2002 to September 2005.

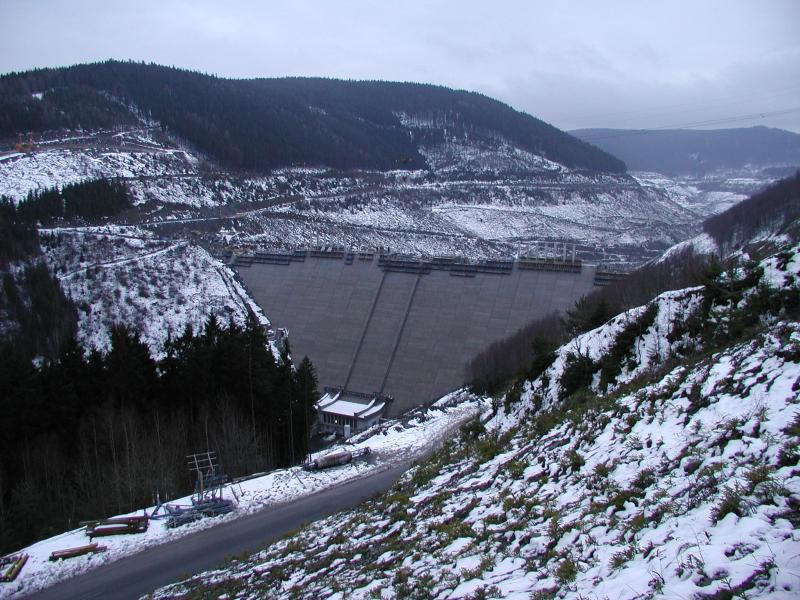
Dam (dark grey) under construction, December 2004.

Inside the formwork, heavy equipment was used to spread and compact the large quantities of concrete. Mini excavators and graders put nearly 2,000 cubic metres (71,000 ft^{3}) of concrete each day into the formwork blocks. Giant cable cranes, reaching over the valley, moved the concrete across the site, with the transport containers holding up to 6 cubic metres (212 ft^{3}) of concrete.

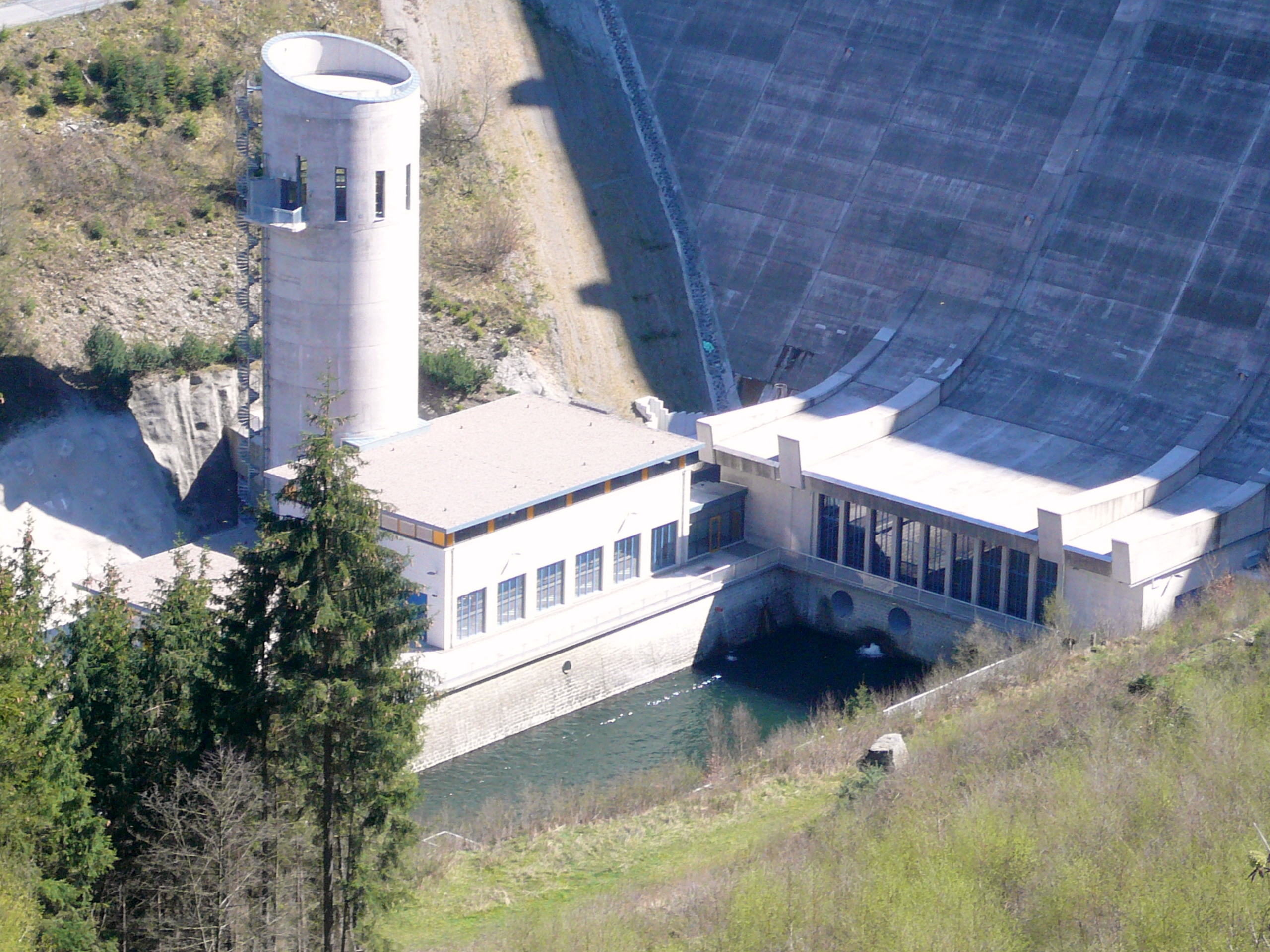
Power station (in the masonry), Stilling basin and sliding housing.

== Pictures ==
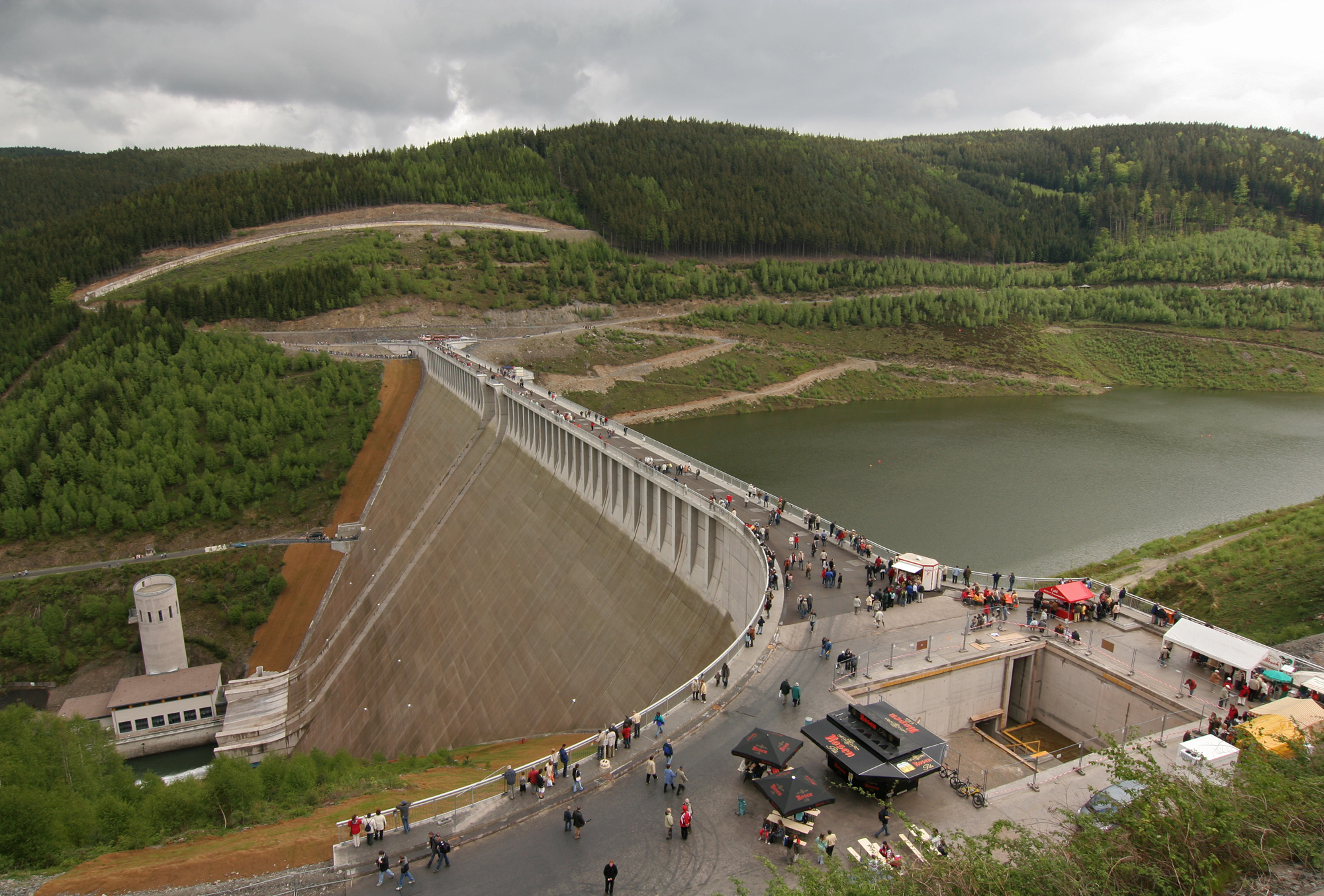
Leibis-Lichte Dam, 102.5 m high (336 ft)

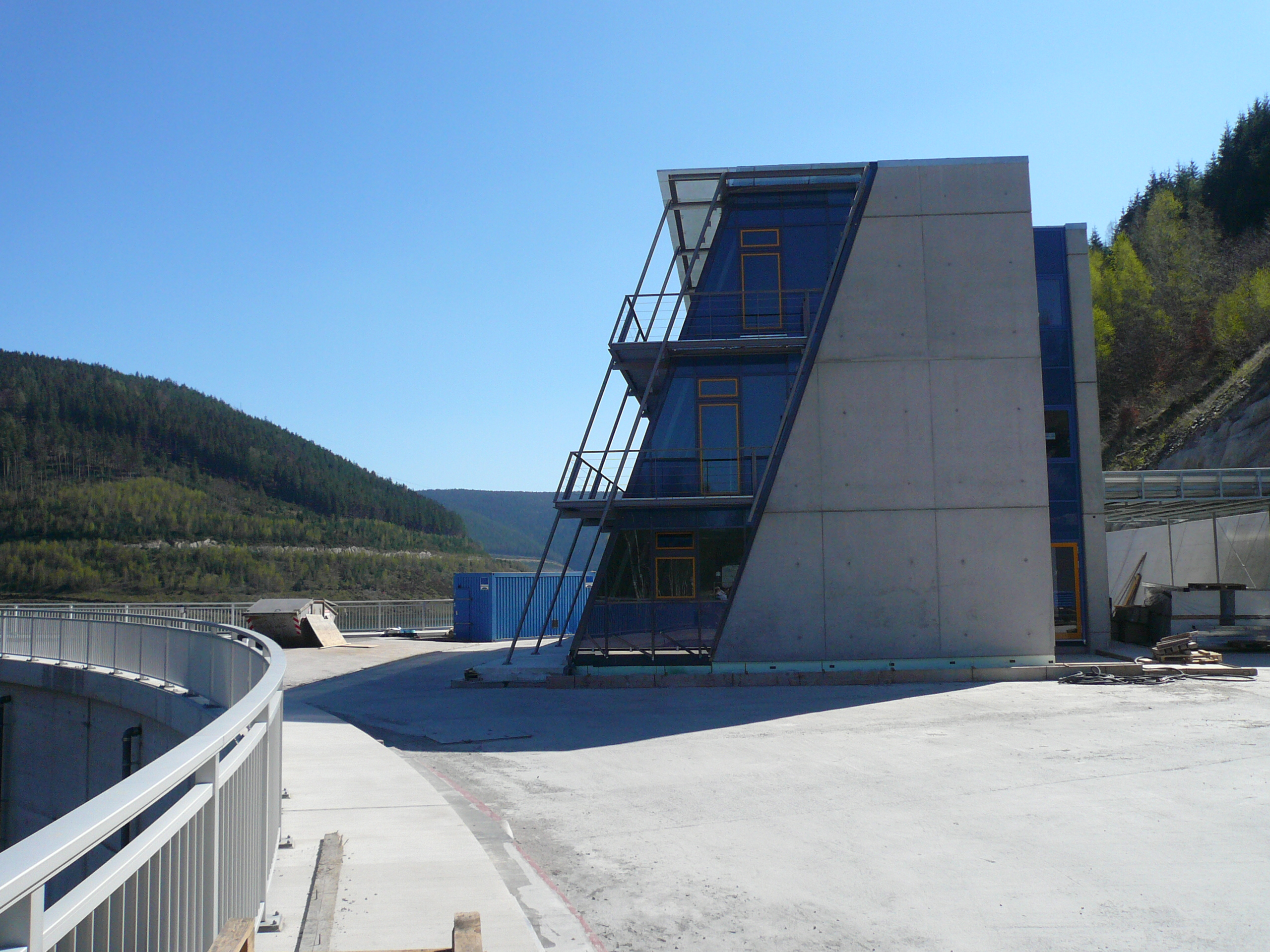
Office building on top of the dam

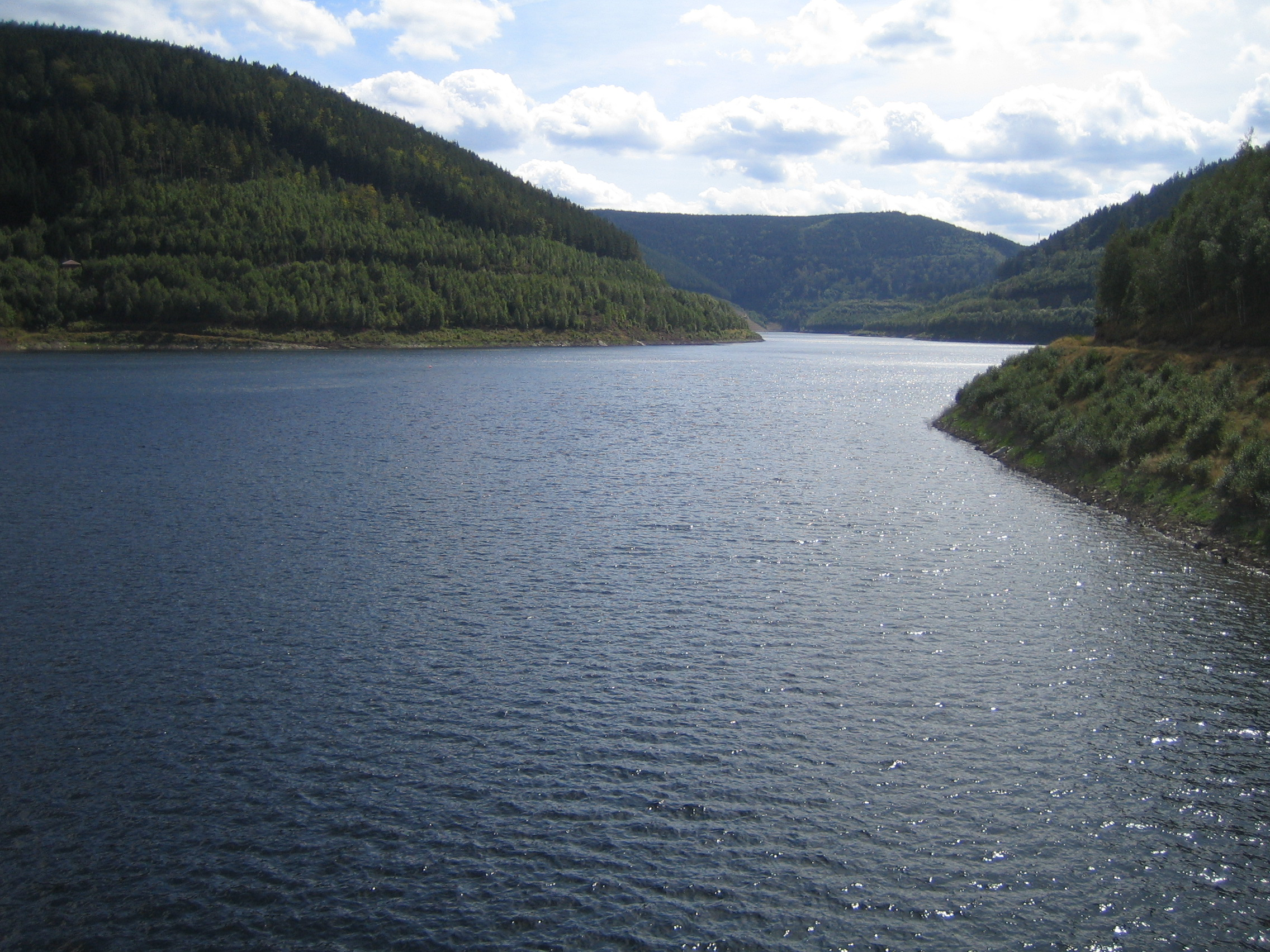
View from the dam to the artificial lake, August 2009

Dam completed, August 2009

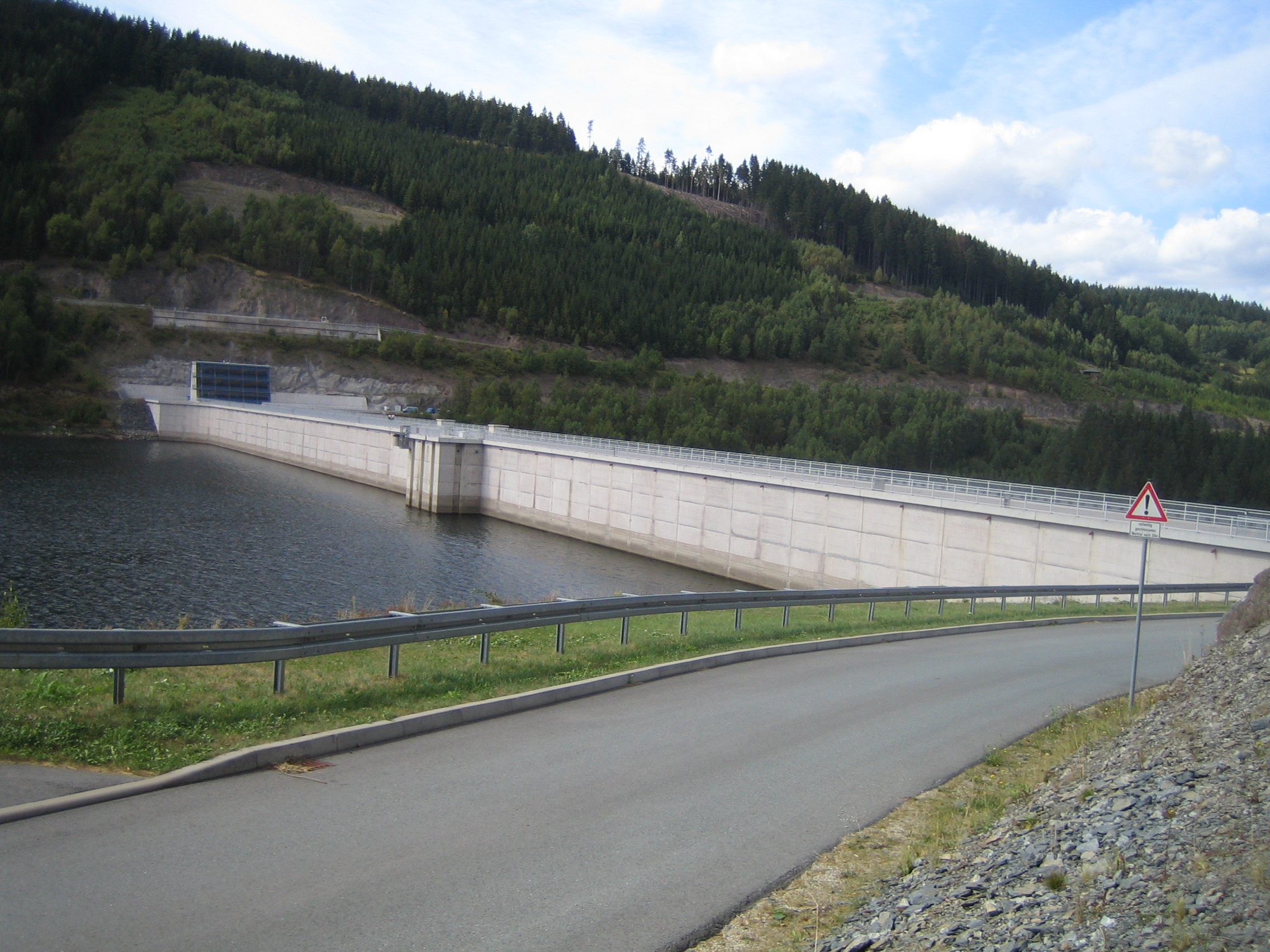
View from inside the waterside

== See also ==
- List of reservoirs and dams in Germany
