= Steinheid =

Village in Thuringia, Germany

- Stadtteil of Neuhaus am Rennweg
- Interactive map of Steinheid
- Location within Germany Location within Thuringia
- Coordinates: 50°28′N 11°5′E
- Country: Germany
- State: Thuringia
- District: Sonneberg
- Town: Neuhaus am Rennweg

Area
  - Total: 23.21 km^{2} (8.96 sq mi)
- Elevation: 800 m (2,600 ft)

Population (2010)
  - Total: 1,183
  - Density: 50.97/km^{2} (132.0/sq mi)
- Time zone: UTC+01:00 (CET)
  - Summer (DST): UTC+02:00 (CEST)
- Postal codes: 98749
- Dialling codes: 036704
- Website: www.steinheid.de

Steinheid (German pronunciation: [ˈʃtaɪnhaɪt]) is a village and a former municipality in the Sonneberg district of Thuringia, Germany. Since 1 December 2011, it is part of the town Neuhaus am Rennweg.

== Demographics ==
Historical population
Year	Pop.	±%
1995	1,454	—
2000	1,388	−4.5%
2005	1,301	−6.3%
2010	1,183	−9.1%
Source: "Thüringer Landesamt für Statistik" (in German).
