= Lichte (river) =

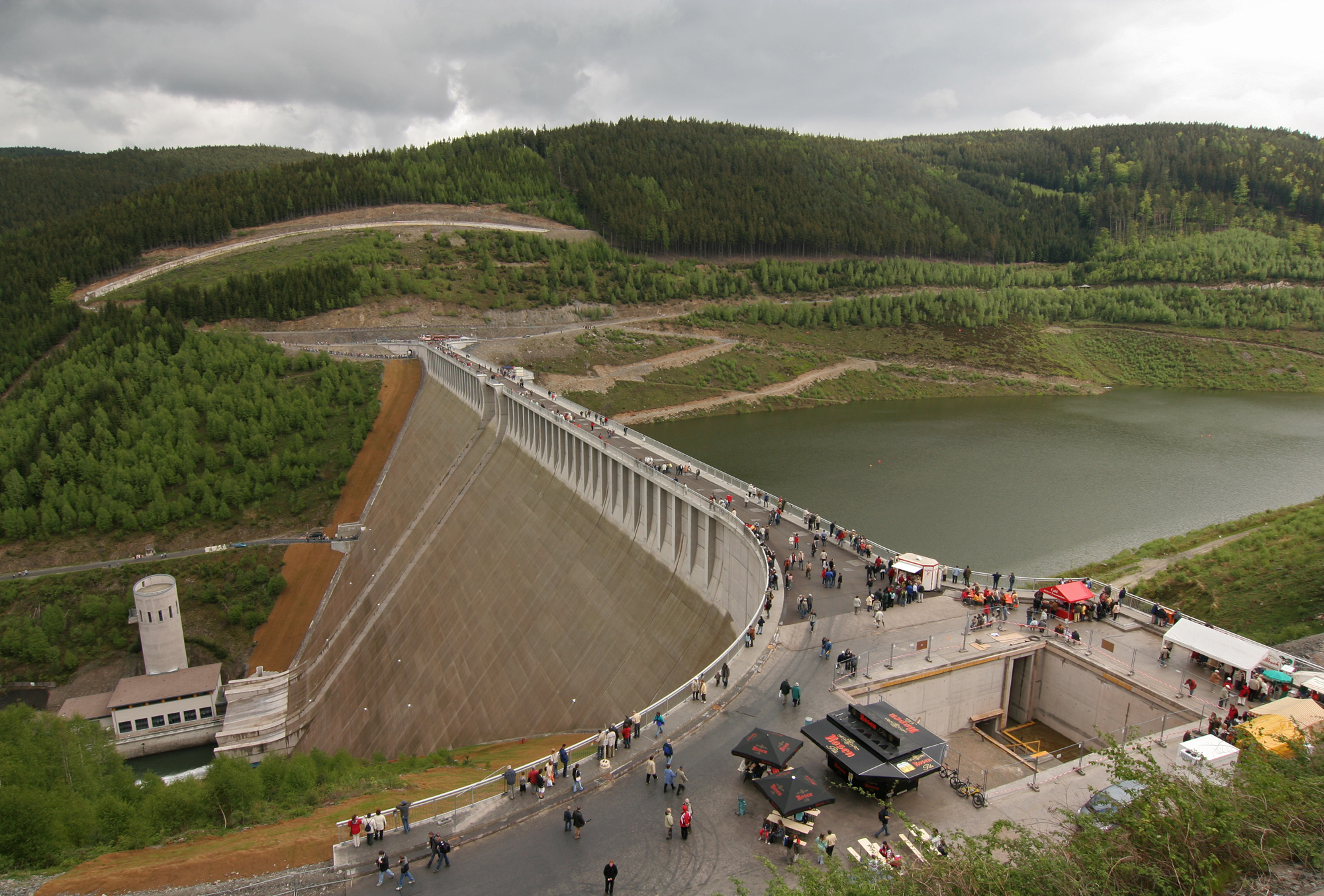
- Leibis-Lichte Dam, 102.5 m high

Location
- Country: Germany
- State: Thuringia

Physical characteristics
- Source
  - location: Neuhaus am Rennweg, Thuringian Forest
  - elevation: 795.3 m (2,609 ft)
- Mouth
  - location: Schwarza
  - coordinates: 50°37′09″N 11°09′21″E
- Length: 17 km (11 mi)
- Basin size: 82.6 km^{2} (31.9 sq mi)
- Discharge
  - average: 314.1 m (1,031 ft)

Basin features
- Progression: Schwarza→ Saale→ Elbe→ North Sea

The Lichte (German pronunciation: [ˈlɪçtə]) is a right tributary of the Schwarza in Thuringia, Germany, and is 17 kilometres (11 mi) long.

== Sources ==
The Lichte rises as the Little Lichte (German: Kleine Lichte) in Neuhaus am Rennweg in the Thuringian Highland.

== Course ==
The Lichte flows north through the Thuringian Forest Nature Park, first through the Finsterer Grund (Dark Valley), where a now closed section of the Sonneberg – Probstzella single-track railway line passes over it on a viaduct. It then reaches the municipality of Lichte, which extends for approximately 5 kilometres (3.1 mi) along its banks. In the centre of Lichte (in the Wallendorf section) the Piesau joins the Lichte. Below the municipality of Lichte, the river passes through a roughly 3-kilometre (1.9 mi) long and 200-metre (660 ft) deep gorge, which ends in the Deesbach Forebay (height 42.5 metres (139 ft)). This is followed by the Leibis-Lichte Dam, the second tallest valley dam in Germany, 102.5 metres (336 ft) high. The municipality of Unterweißbach borders the dam and extends for approximately 3 kilometres (1.9 mi) along the river, which then empties into the Schwarza to the west of the municipality at Mankenbachsmuehle.

The Lichte and Piesau both have unusually steep and deep gorges, the difference between hill tops and valley bottoms often exceeding 200 metres (660 ft).

== Tributaries ==
Tributaries of the Lichte River:
Left	Ascherbach	Dorstbach	Geiersbach	Fischbach	Horbach	Weissbach
Right	Kieselbach	Piesau	Hölle	Feldbach	Schlagebach	Quilitybach

The rivers and streams in the area of the Lichte valley have been known for centuries for deposits of placer gold and are considered the most significant sources of gold in Germany. Recreational placer miners continue to find occasional gold nuggets.

== See also ==
- List of reservoirs and dams in Germany
- List of rivers of Thuringia
