= Rottenbach, Thuringia =

Rottenbach
- Stadtteil of Königsee
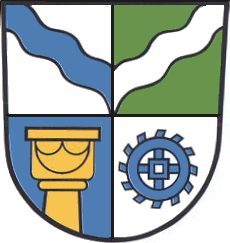
- Coat of arms
- Interactive map of Rottenbach
- Location within Germany Location within Thuringia
- Coordinates: 50°41′17″N 11°9′50″E
- Country: Germany
- State: Thuringia
- District: Saalfeld-Rudolstadt
- Town: Königsee
- Subdivisions: 9

Area
  - Total: 52.26 km^{2} (20.18 sq mi)
- Elevation: 280 m (920 ft)

Population (2011-12-31)
  - Total: 1,848
  - Density: 35.36/km^{2} (91.59/sq mi)
- Time zone: UTC+01:00 (CET)
  - Summer (DST): UTC+02:00 (CEST)
- Postal codes: 07422
- Dialling codes: 036739
- Vehicle registration: SLF
- Website: www.gemeinderottenbach.de

Rottenbach (German pronunciation: [ˈʁɔtn̩ˌbax]) is a village and a former municipality in the district Saalfeld-Rudolstadt, in Thuringia, Germany. Since 31 December 2012, it is part of the town Königsee.
