= Schwarza (Saale) =

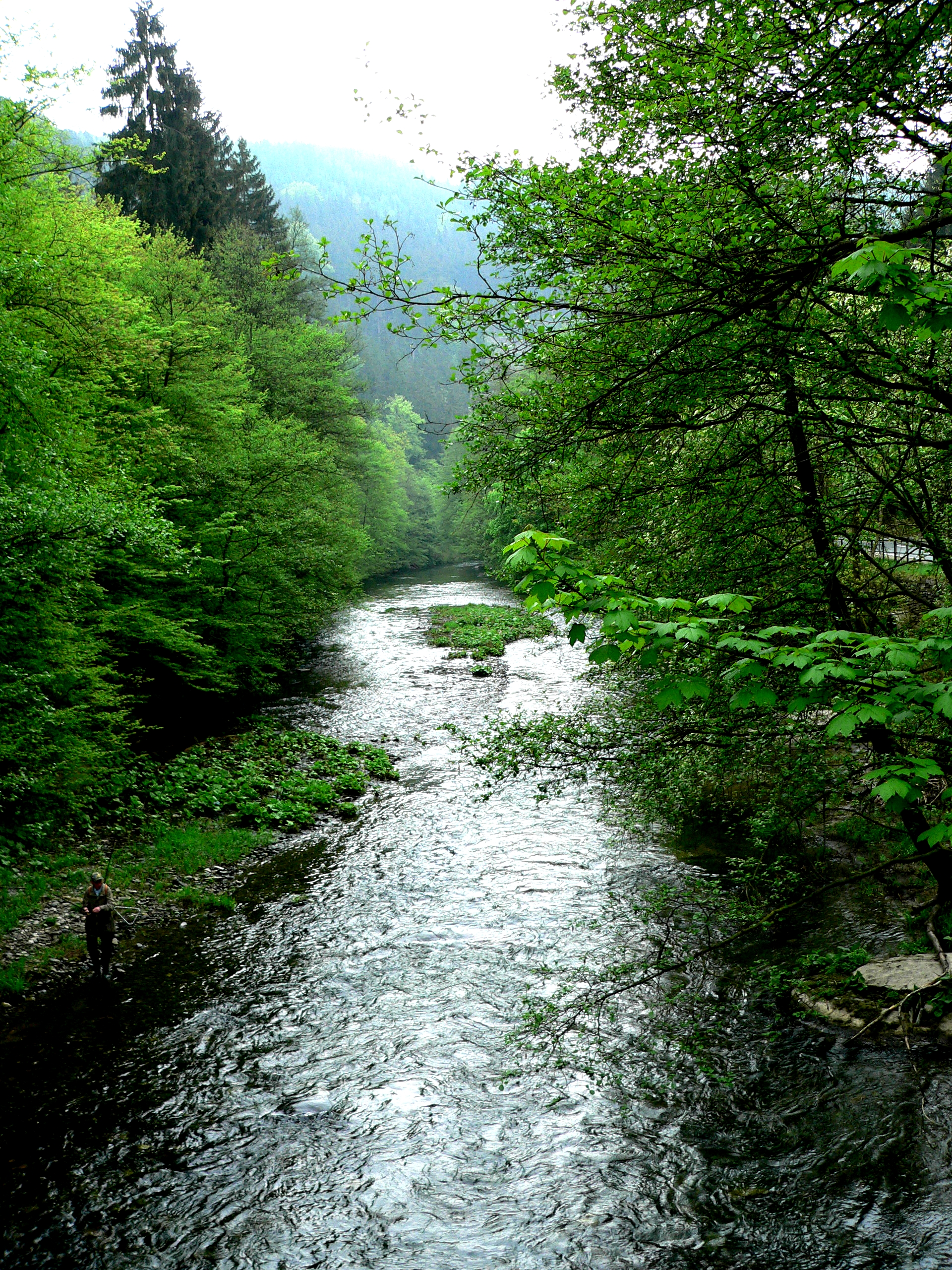

Location
- Country: Germany
- State: Thuringia

Physical characteristics
- Source
  - location: Thuringian Forest
- Mouth
  - location: Saale
  - coordinates: 50°41′0″N 11°19′21″E
- Length: 53 km (33 mi)

Basin features
- Progression: Saale→ Elbe→ North Sea

The Schwarza (German pronunciation: [ˈʃvaʁtsa]) is a left tributary of the Saale in Thuringia, central Germany.

The Schwarza is 53 km (33 mi) long. Its source is in the Thuringian Forest, near Neuhaus am Rennweg. It flows into the Saale in Rudolstadt. Other towns on the Schwarza are Schwarzburg and Bad Blankenburg. It has 50 tributaries, the largest being the Lichte, the Sorbitz, the Werre and the Rinne. Its name, meaning "black river", comes from its dark colour in its upper course and the thick forest which originally overshadowed the narrow valley.

The Schwarza valley (German: Schwarzatal) parallels the axis of the Schwarzburg anticline (Schwarzburger Sattel), a structure that divides the Thuringian Forest to the northwest from the Thuringian Highland to the southeast. The Schwarzburg Anticline was created by the collision between Laurentia and Gondwana around 350 million years ago. The rock of the Schwarzburg Anticline is metamorphic, with a core of ordovician rock, largely quartzite. The river is geologically unusual for the large number of kolks in its lower course.

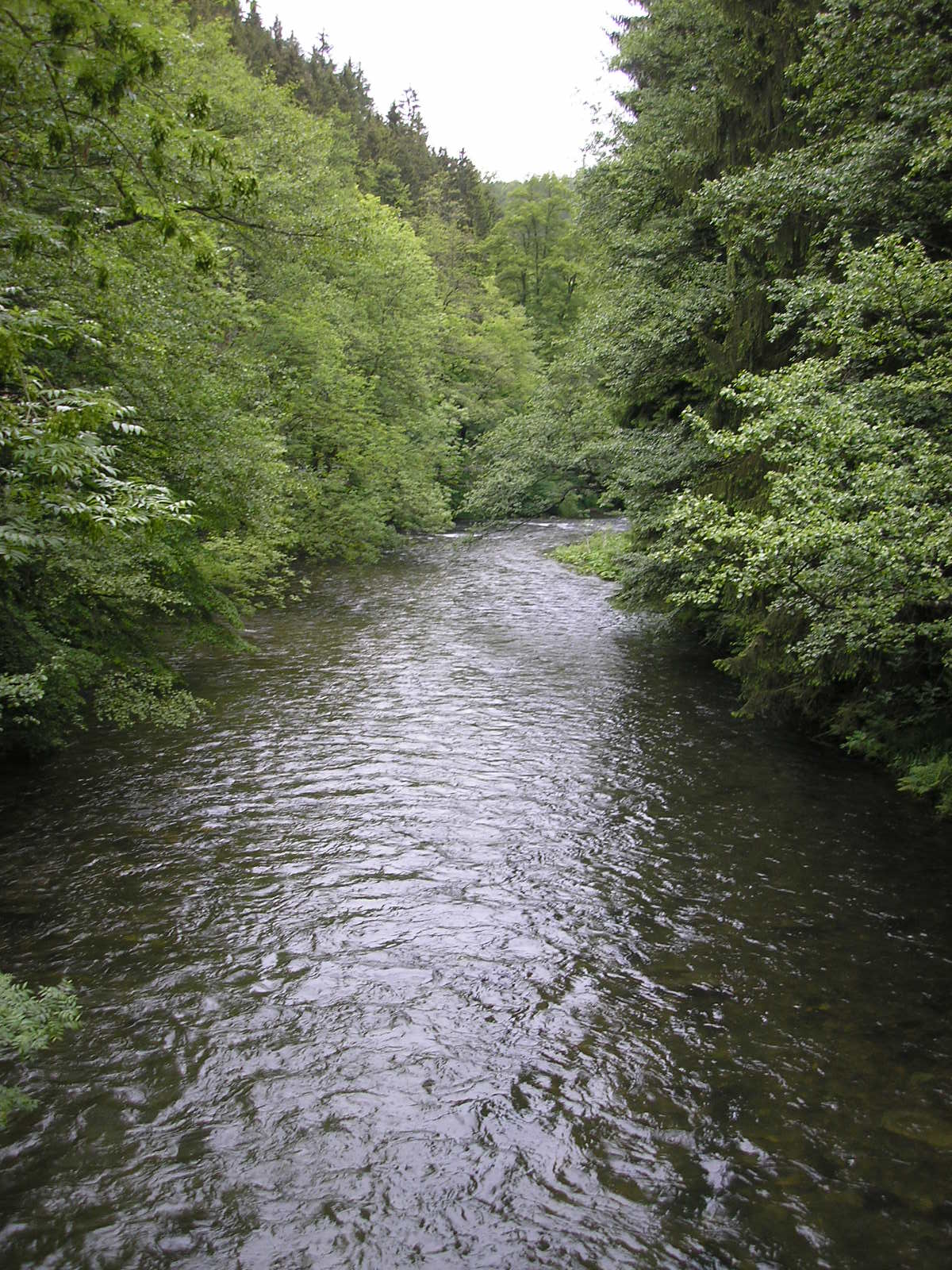
Schwarza at Schwarzburg

The Schwarza river is the richest in gold in Germany, and its valley has been known for its deposits of placer gold since the 12th century. In 1442, the rights to the gold deposits of the Schwarza valley were granted to the Counts of Schwarzburg. Recreational placer miners continue to find occasional gold nuggets in the Schwarza to this day.

== See also ==
- List of rivers of Thuringia
