= Dreiherrenstein =

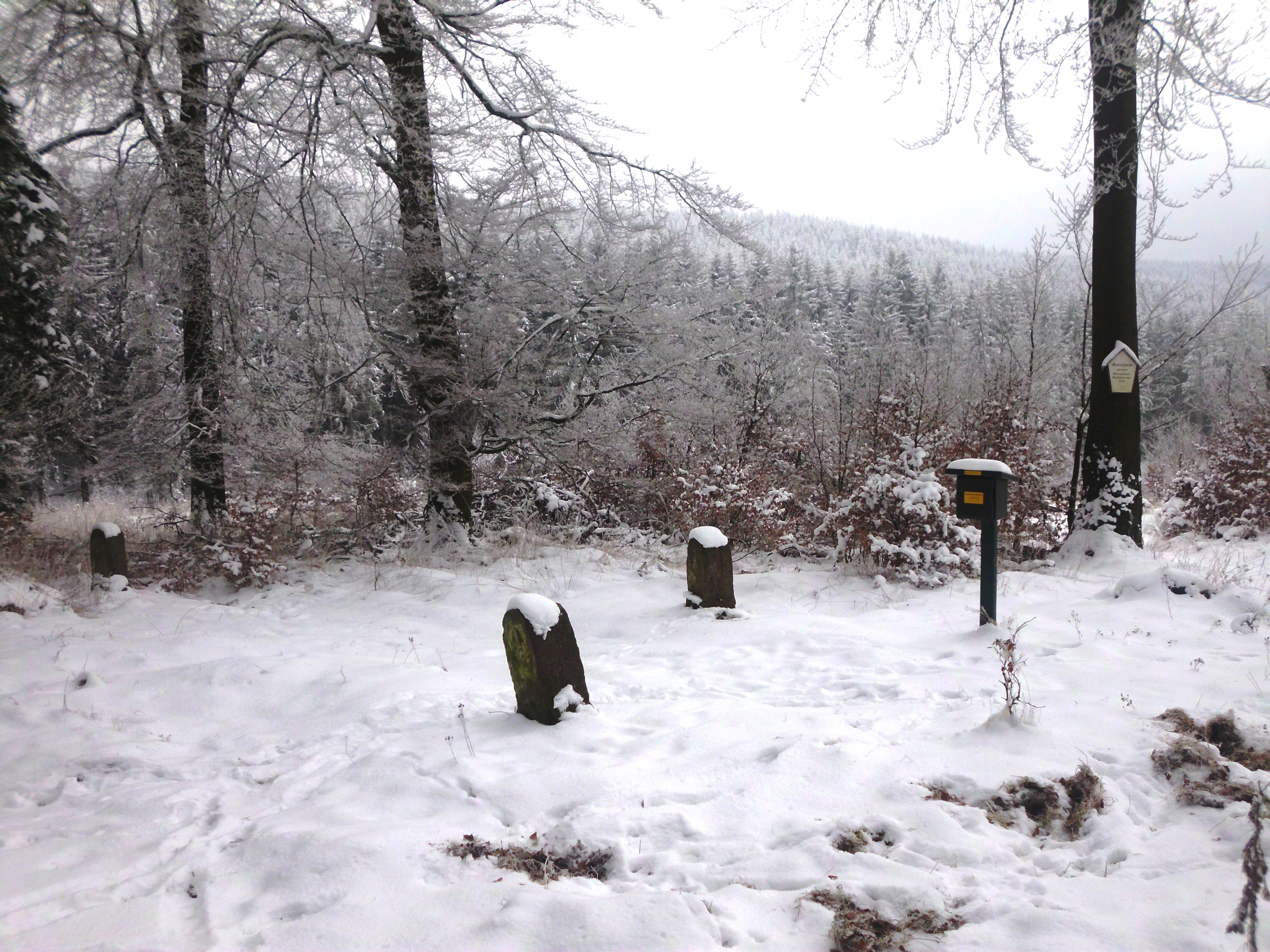
An example of Dreiherrensteine near Breitenstein

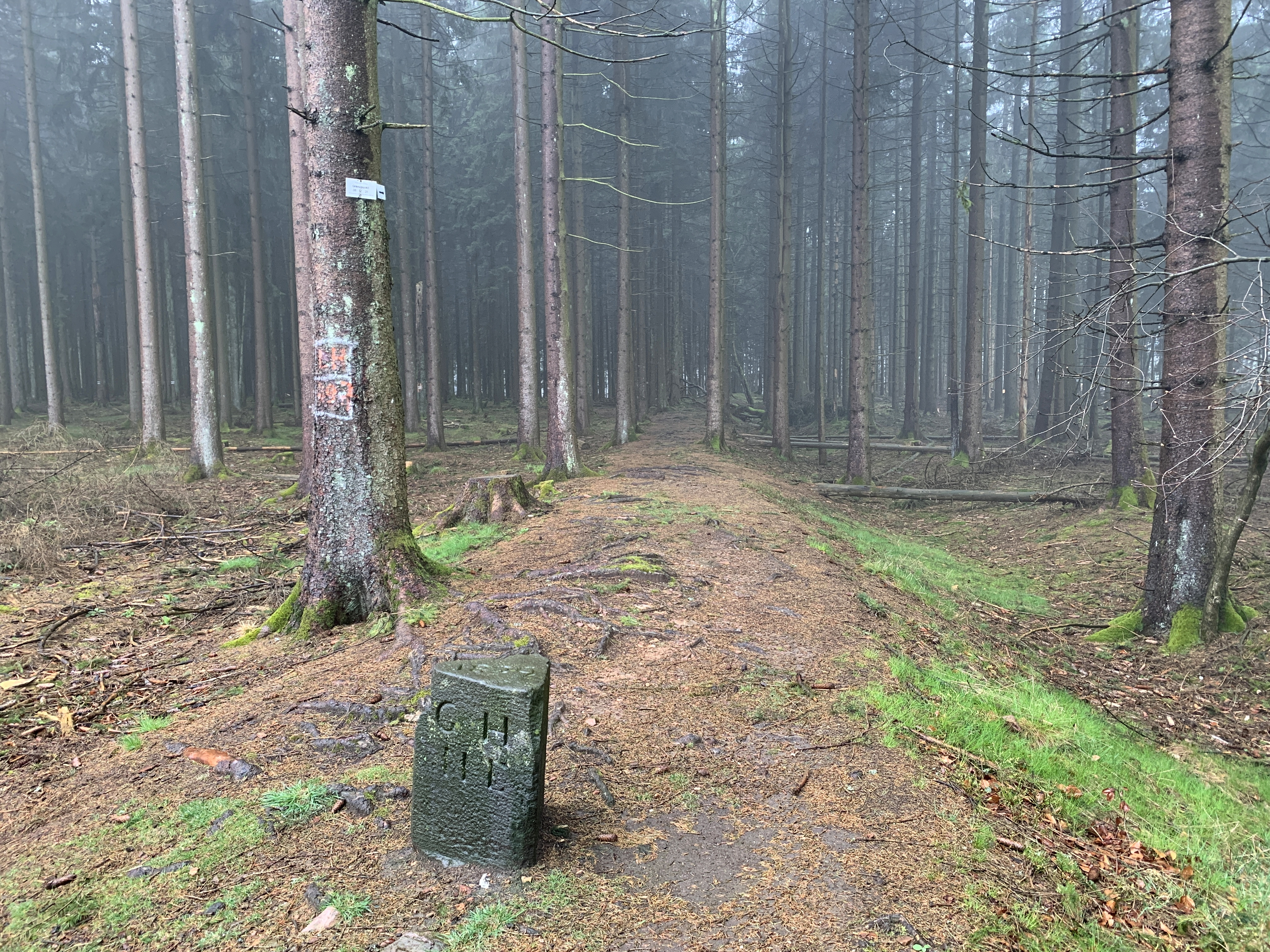
Old triangular boundary stone one the Limes border wall of the Roman Empire

A Dreiherrenstein or Dreiherrnstein is the topographic name of a historical tripoint, especially in the German-speaking lands of central Europe, i.e. a place where the border of three princely territories met, together with any enclosures or border fortifications. The word means literally "Three Lords' Stone".

== Examples ==
Examples of places where Dreiherrensteine are located include:

- Boundary stone between the municipalities of Friesenhagen, Wenden and the town of Freudenberg. Es handelt sich um die former border of the Barony of Wildenburg with the kurkölnischen Duchy of Westphalia and the Principality of Nassau-Siegen.
- Boundary stone in Medenbach, Wiesbaden, in the parish of "Wellinger" that once marked the borders of Nassau-Idstein, Electoral Mainz and the Hesse-Darmstadt. It bears the date 1730.
- Boundary stone between the bishoprics of Münster, Osnabrück and Orange
- Boundary stone in the municipality of Bellingen (Westerwald) on the border between Electoral Trier, Orange-Nassau and Sayn-Hachenburg, dated 1780
- Boundary stone between Electoral Trier, Orange-Nassau and Sayn-Hachenburg in the municipality of Rothenbach, 1790
- Dreiherrenstein, Meisenbach between Electoral Cologne, the Duchy of Berg and County of Sayn near Kircheib at the Landgraben there
- Dreiherrenstein near Oberwiesenthal in the Ore Mountains
- Boundary stone on the Ravensberg (Harz)
- Boundary stone on the Hartenberg near Elbingerode (Harz)
- Boundary stone south of Benneckenstein on the Trans-Harz Railway near the former railway station of Kälberbruch. It was on the border between the Kingdom of Hanover, Kingdom of Prussia and Duchy of Brunswick of 1841
- Boundary stone east of Nordhalben in the Frankenwald; border between Prince-Bishopric of Bamberg, Barony of Gera (later the Principality of Reuß j. L.) and Barony of Lichtenberg (later the Margraviate of Kulmbach-Bayreuth, then Kingdom of Prussia, finally Kingdom of Bavaria)
- Dreiherrnstein on the Riemen on an eminence (673,9 m) near the mountain of Riemen in the Rothaar Mountains
- Dreifürstenstein on the 854-metre-high Dreifürstenstein near Mössingen (county of Tübingen) from the 17th century
- Dreiherrensteine from the Hainich in western Thuringia
- Boundary stone near Sohland/Spree in Upper Lusatia from the year 1750, with the coats of arms of the adjacent baronies: von the Sahla (Sohland), County Salm-Reifferscheidt (Hainspach in Bohemia) and Chapter of St. Peter’s, Bautzen (Wehrsdorf)
- Boundary stone, known as the Tafelstein, on the hillside of the Tafelfichte (Smrk) in the Isergebirge; since ancient times it has marked the boundary point between Upper Lusatia, Silesia and Bohemia and was, from 1742 to 1815, also the tripoint between Saxony, Prussia and Austria
- Dreiherrenstein in the Kellerwald on the border point of Hesse-Darmstadt (denoted by GH), Hesse-Kassel (KH) and Waldeck (W or FW for the Principality of Waldeck)
- Dreiherrenstein at the Weißenberg (county of Südwestpfalz, Rheinland-Pfalz) in the Palatine Forest on the former border point of the estates of the Wittelsbach dukes of Palatinate-Zweibrücken, the Leiningen counts and the Barony of Gräfenstein
- Dreiherrenstein, Neustall in the Hessian Vogelsberg on the boundary of the parishes of Hintersteinau, Neustall and Holzmühl
- Boundary stone number 467.3 at the junction of the parishes of Bad Kreuznach, Altenbamberg and Frei-Laubersheim which, from 1815 to 1945, marked the tripoint of Prussia, Bavaria and Hesse-Darmstadt. The rock was so badly damaged on 12 November 1933 (the day of the first Reichstag election involving the Nazi party) as part of a large-scale campaign of destruction by the Hitler Youth against the great number of German states, which in the border area between Rhenish Hesse and the Palatinate alone saw the destruction of 77 boundary stones, that the marking on it were no longer visible; instead only the initials of the Hitler Youth ("HJ") remain today.
- Dreiherrenstein at the Heldrastein near Treffurt (Wartburgkreis, Thuringia) on the Hessian-Thuringian state border at a former border point between the Kingdom of Prussia (Province of Saxony, Regierungsbezirk Erfurt), Kingdom of Prussia, Province of Hesse-Nassau, Regierungsbezirk Kassel (before 1866 Electorate of Hesse) and Grand Duchyof Saxe-Weimar-Eisenach. Probably erected after 1866, restored 2002, height 488.5 m above NN.
- Dreiherrenstein near Maltitz on the border between Saxony, Saxony-Anhalt and Thuringia
- Dreiländerstein (Eggenthal), on the county boundary between Eggenthal, Ostallgäu and Unteregg, Unterallgäu on the old border point between Irsee Abbey, Kempten Abbey and Electoral Bavarian Mindelheim

== Dreiherrensteine on the Rennsteig Trail ==
A total of 13 Dreiherrensteine is located on the Rennsteig, of which 11 are in Thuringia and two in Bavaria. They are, from west to east:

- Dreiherrenstein at Glasbach (1643, near Ruhla – missing)
- Dreiherrenstein am Großen Weißenberg (1783, bei Steinbach)
- Dreiherrenstein am Hangweg (1586, near Floh-Seligenthal)
- Gustav-Freytag-Stein (1719, near Oberhof – Dreiherrenstein fehlt)
- Stone 16 or the Dietzel-Geba-Stein (1734, near Oberhof)
- Kleiner Dreiherrenstein (1630, near Frauenwald)
- Großer Dreiherrenstein (1596, near Frauenwald)
- Dreiherrenstein an der Hohen Heide (1846, near Masserberg)
- Dreistromstein and Kleiner Dreiherrenstein (1733, near Siegmundsburg)
- Dreiherrenstein, Hohe(r) Lach (1548, near Neuhaus am Rennweg)
- Dreiherrenstein, Sperbersbach (1821, near Tettau)
- Dreiwappenstein at Kießlich (1717, near Steinbach am Wald)
- Dreiherrenstein, Hohe Tanne (1845, near Brennersgrün)

== See also ==
- Tripoint
