= Saar (Werra) =

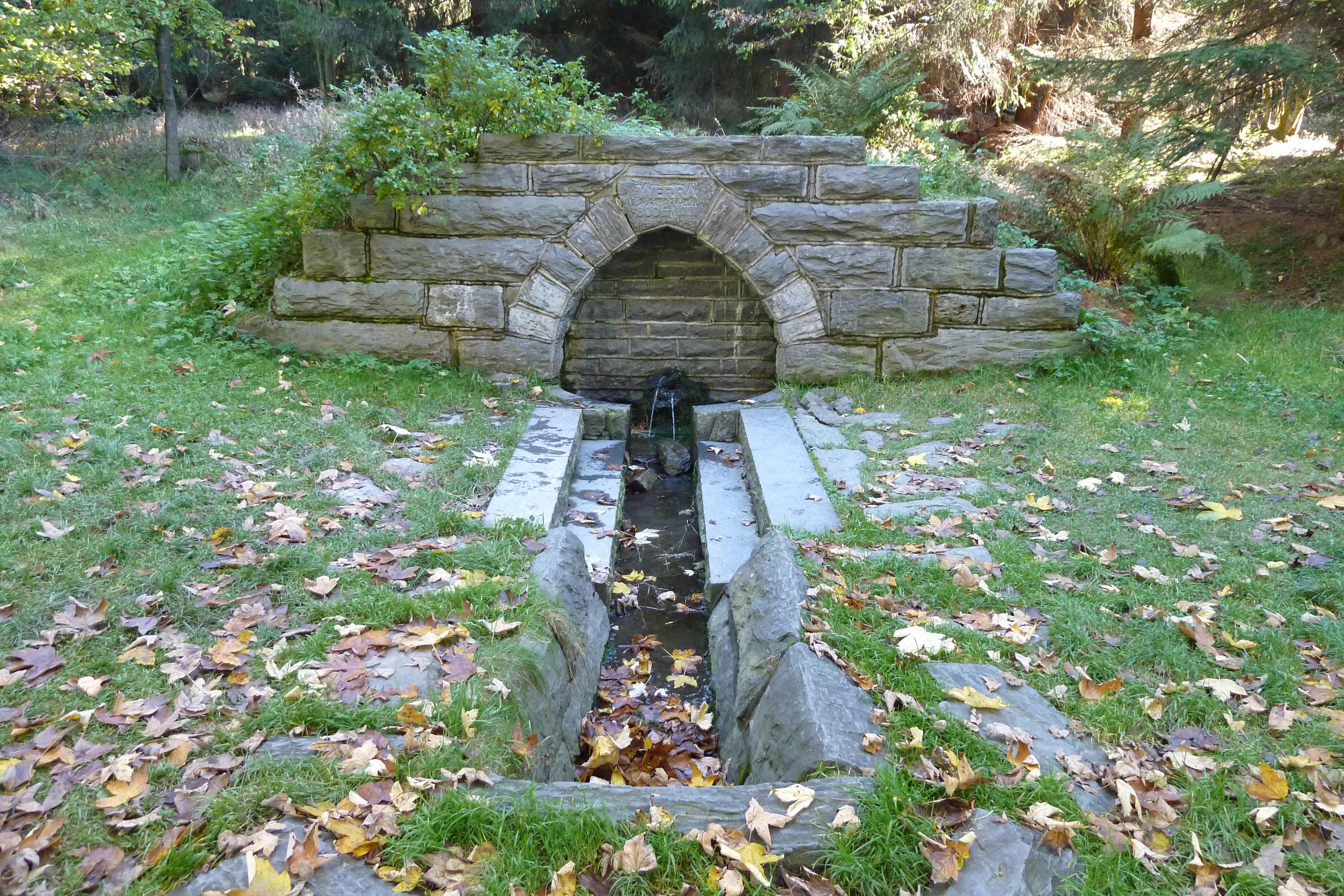

Location
- Country: Germany
- States: Thuringia

Physical characteristics
- Mouth
  - location: Werra
  - coordinates: 50.4501°N 10.9630°E

Basin features
- Progression: Werra→ Weser→ North Sea

The Saar is a river in the state of Thuringia, Germany. It is 6.5 km long and flows into the Werra at Sachsenbrunn.

== Course ==
The Saar rises close to the watershed of its basin and is the "outermost" tributary of the Werra, and thus of the Weser. Its source lies near the Dreistromstein in the Thuringian Forest, a marker indicating the confluence of the three basins of the Rhine, the Weser, and the Elbe. It originates at an elevation of 800 metressouthwest of Siegmundsburg on the northwest slope of Dürre Fichte (861 m) in the Thuringian Slate Mountains.

After approximately 150 metres, it leaves the Sonneberg district and enters the Hildburghausen district. The Saar flows west then southwest through the Saargrund valley, passing the settlement of the same name. The national highway Bundesstraße 281 follows the route of the river route across the northern face of Bleßberg (866.9 m).

In its final kilometre the stream leaves the forest and reaches the Schirnrod, before merging with the Werra in Schwarzenbrunn, both settlements belonging to the town of Eisfeld. With its confluence at an elevation of 491 metres, the Saar descends 309 meters over its course, resulting in an average gradient of nearly 5%.

== Historical dispute over source of the Werra ==
In 1910, the residents of Siegmundsburg capped the spring source of the Saar and declared it the "true" source of the Werra, in a dispute with the village of Fehrenbach that had continued at least since 1648. They argued that it was located at a higher elevation than the source near Fehrenbach at Sommerberg, which its own residents had capped and named the true source in 1897. The feud escalated in 1926 when the Saar spring was destroyed by members of the opposing group. A 1975 political decision officially decreed the Fehrenbach spring to be the source, but the dispute was revisited after German reunification in 1992, when the Saar spring was once more capped with an inscription marking it as the Werra's source.

== See also ==
- List of rivers of Thuringia
