= Rennsteig =

Long-distance trail in Germany

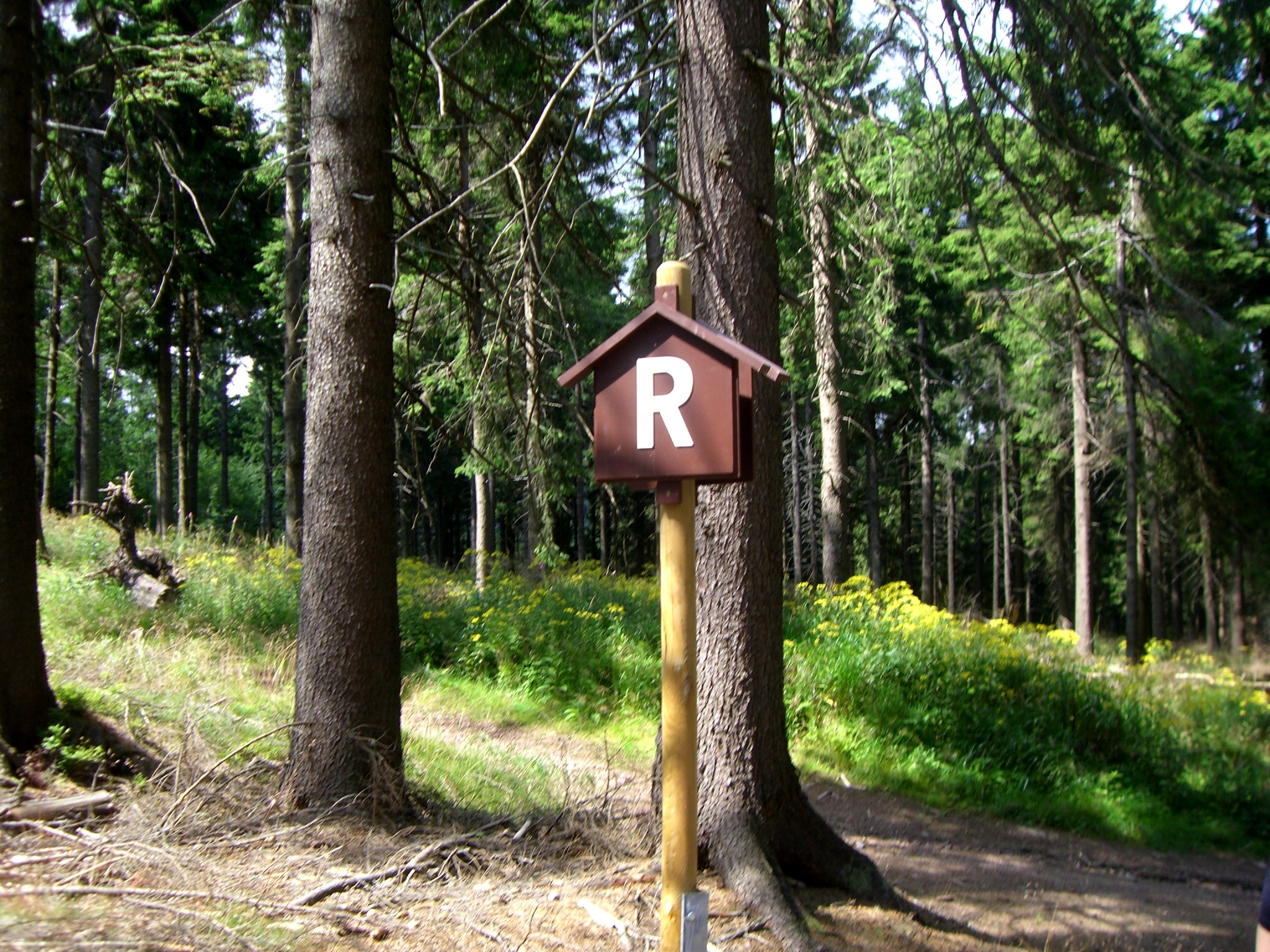
'R' sign on the Rennsteig

The Rennsteig (German pronunciation: [ˈʁɛnʃtaɪk]) is a ridge walk as well as a historical boundary path in the Thuringian Forest, Thuringian Highland and Franconian Forest in Central Germany. The long-distance trail runs for about 170 km (110 miles) from Eisenach and the Werra valley in the northwest to Blankenstein and the Selbitz river in the southeast.

The Rennsteig is also the watershed between the river systems of the Weser, Elbe and Rhine. The catchment areas of all three river systems meet at the Dreistromstein ("Three Rivers Rock") near Siegmundsburg.

== Route ==
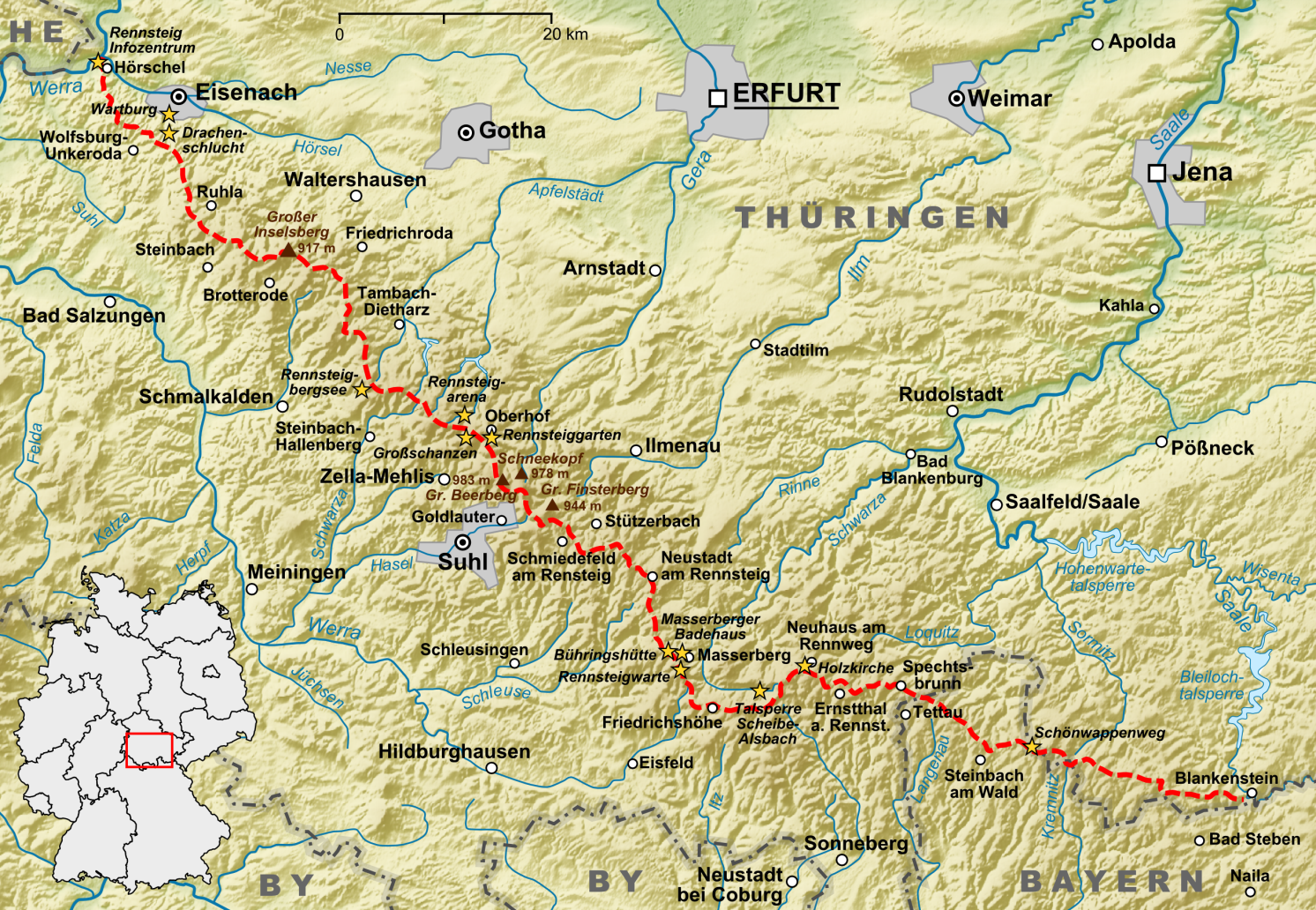
Map of the Rennsteig trail

The Rennsteig runs along the ridge of the Thuringian Central Uplands (Mittelgebirge) from northwest to southeast mostly at heights of around 500 to 970 metres. It starts in the Eisenach town quarter of Hörschel by the River Werra (196 m above NHN) and ends in Blankenstein by the River Saale (414 m above NHN). In 2003 the Rennsteig was re-surveyed by the Thuringian State Office for Survey and Geoinformation; they reported that it had a total length of 169.29 km (105.19 miles). The marking along the trail is very good, usually indicated by a white 'R' (called Mareile). Along the Rennsteig there are small, open shelters about every 5 to 10 kilometres.

The course of the Spitter stream, the only river in the central section of the Rennsteig, crosses the trail in the Ebertswiese nature reserve, at a height of 700 metres, before feeding the nearby Spitter Waterfall. Another stream that crosses the trail is the Dober in the southeastern part of the route, which forms part of the Franconian Forest immediately by the Thuringian–Bavarian border west of Brennersgrün, part of the borough of Lehesten.

Four tunnels run under the Rennsteig ridge: One is the eponymous Rennsteig Tunnel, which comprises two tubes that are 7,916 m (25,971 ft) and 7,878 m (25,846 ft) long, making it the longest road tunnel in Germany. The tunnel was opened in 2003 as a motorway tunnel for the A 71 autobahn. The second is the 3,039 m (9,970 ft) long Brandleite Tunnel, which was opened in 1884 and leads the Erfurt–Schweinfurt railway under the Thuringian Forest. The vertical height difference between the two tunnels is less than seven metres. The third is the 549 m (1,801 ft) long Förtha Tunnel on the Werra Railway. The 8,314 m (27,277 ft) long Bleßberg Tunnel is part of the Nuremberg–Erfurt high-speed railway.

=== Districts along the Rennsteig ===
The Rennsteig runs through the town of Eisenach, and the districts of Wartburgkreis, Gotha, Schmalkalden-Meiningen, the town of Suhl, the districts of Ilm, Hildburghausen, Saalfeld-Rudolstadt, Sonneberg, Kronach and the Saale-Orla district.

=== Towns and villages ===
From northwest to southeast: Hörschel, Wolfsburg-Unkeroda, Ruhla, Steinbach, Brotterode, Oberhof, Suhl-Goldlauter, Schmiedefeld am Rennsteig, Stützerbach, Allzunah, Frauenwald, Neustadt am Rennsteig, Masserberg, Friedrichshöhe, Siegmundsburg, Scheibe-Alsbach, Steinheid, Neuhaus am Rennweg, Ernstthal am Rennsteig, Spechtsbrunn, Tettau, Steinbach am Forest, Blankenstein.

== History ==
=== First record and meaning of the name ===
The Rynnestig was first mentioned in a 1330 border charter issued in Schmalkalden. Etymologists are inconclusive about the origin of its name. It may go back to Rain, hunter's jargon for "border". In Old High German, a renniweg is a narrow footpath or bridleway in contrast to a Heerstraße or military road. In records dating back to 1546 the path is referred to as the Rensteig.

In addition to the well-known Rennsteig trail itself, there are about 250 other "Rennsteigs" and "Rennwegs" in German-speaking countries. Some of these are older and some more recent than that of the Thuringian Forest. This casts doubt upon its meaning as a genuine boundary path.

=== Middle Ages ===
Throughout the Middle Ages, the Rennsteig marked the boundary of the Duchy of Franconia with the Landgraviate of Thuringia. Even today it forms a clear border between the Franconian part of South Thuringia from the otherwise Thuringian–Upper Saxon lands of Thuringia. The Rennsteig as a language border separates the East Franconian dialects (Hennebergisch, Itzgründisch and Upper Franconian) from the Thuringian dialects (Central Thuringian, Ilm Thuringian and Southeastern Thuringian) spoken in the mountains, in the northern part and east of the Thuringian Forest.

=== Modern era ===
The hiking trail was first described and mapped by the cartographer Julius von Plänckner (1791–1858) in his 1832 book Taschenbuch für Reisende durch den Thüringerwald. In July 1889 the author August Trinius (1851–1919) hiked along the Rennsteig ridge and published his book Der Rennstieg the next year, whereafter the trail became famous well beyond the borders of Thuringia and Franconia mainly through the publications of the Rennsteig Club founded in 1896. From 1897 to 1942, the club organised the annual Runst hiking tour in six stages along the Rennsteig. The Rennsteiglied is a wandering song written in 1951, that symbolises the spirit of the Thuringian people.

After World War II, the trail was not completely passable as it crossed the inner German border several times. After the Peaceful Revolution of 1989, it was officially reopened on 28 April 1990. In Thuringia, the trail was declared a heritage site in 1997.

=== Rennsteig stones ===
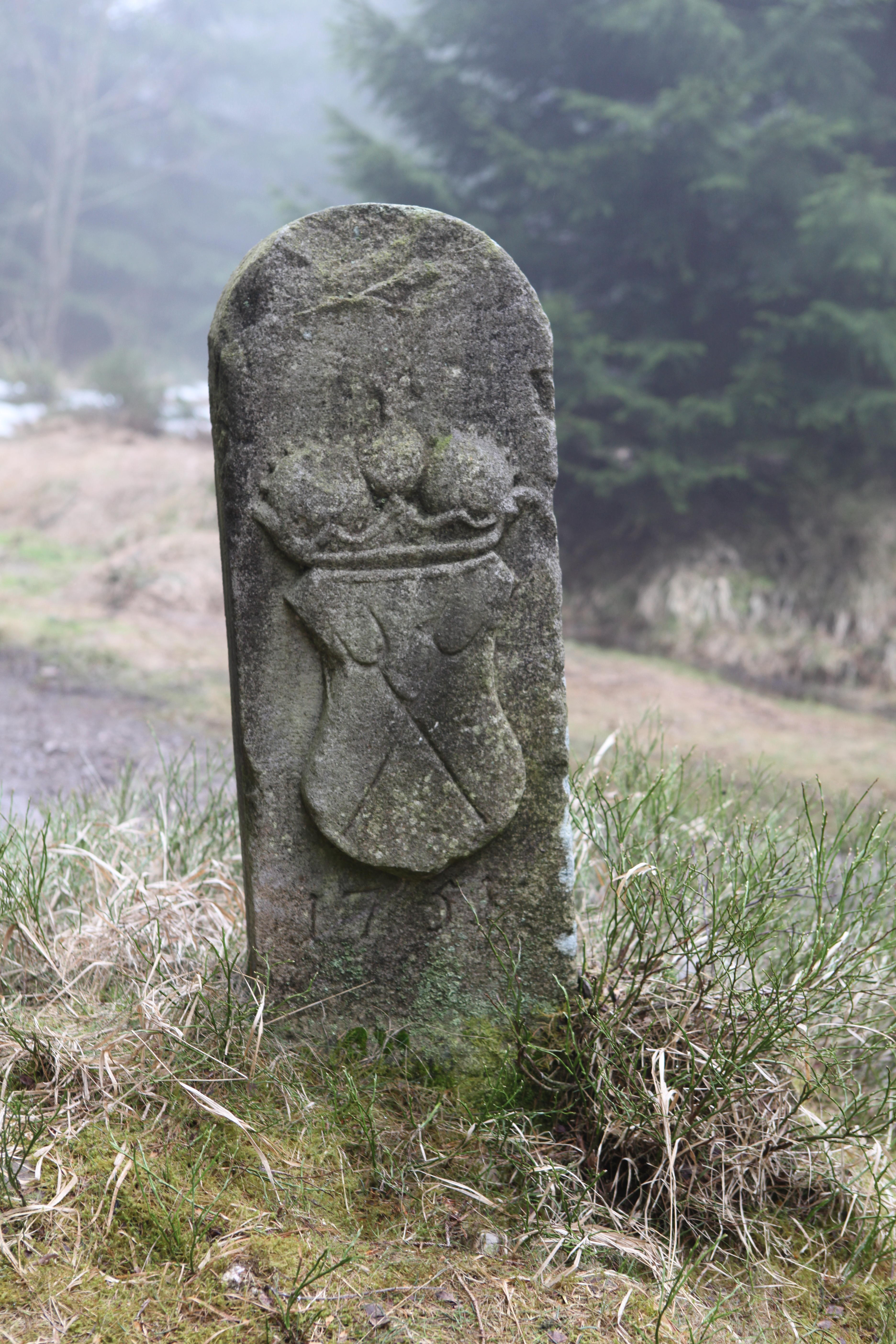
Historic Schwarzburg-Rudolstadt border stone

Along the Rennsteig there are about 1,300 historic boundary stones. Since the 16th century the Rennsteig, most of which was a border path, was marked with these political and national emblems. Of particular note are the 13 so-called Dreiherrensteine, of which only ten lie immediately on the Rennsteig. In local parlance these stones became known as Rennsteigstein or Rennsteig stones. The boundary stones surviving today stem mainly from the 18th century. In addition to boundary stones, there are also forest stones, stone crosses and monuments along the trail.

In Oberhof during the GDR period, there was a hotel (later demolished) of the same name in the shape of a boundary stone.

A German mountain path is she! It flees the towns and hides its bashful course amongst the thickets.

— Am Anfang by Joseph Victor von Scheffel, 1863

Around June time, when from the gorges of the wooded heights, which run through the Thuringian Basin, the heavy scent of jasmine wafted down from the alder buckthorn, those were delightful walking days, here through the balmy fertile land almost free of industry with its friendly clustered villages of timber framed houses; and then onward out of the tapestry of arable fields, dominated by cattle-breeding farms, and followed the legendary highland path onto the mountain ridge with its spruce and beech — the Rennsteig — which, with its downward sweeping views into the Werra valley, ran from the Franconian Forest to Eisenach, the Hörselstadt, and became more and more beautiful, meaningful, romantic...

— Doctor Faustus by Thomas Mann, 1947

== Rennsteig trail ==
Today the Rennsteig is designated by the German Mountain and Hiking Club (Verband Deutscher Gebirgs- und Wandervereine) as an outstanding high-grade hiking trail. The Rennsteig Cycle Path was opened on 19 June 2000. Most of it is provided with a water-bound surface, some sections also run along quiet country lanes. Here and there it departs from the course of the historic Rennsteig, so that steep inclines may be avoided. It is therefore about 30 km longer than the hiking trail.

The Rennsteig is connected to the E3 European long distance path, which goes from the Atlantic coast of Spain to the Black Sea coast of Bulgaria, and the E6 European long distance path, running from Arctic Finland to Turkey.

In the winter, in good snow conditions, langlauf skiing or hiking in snowshoes is possible and the Rennsteig is maintained as a winter hiking trail in places.

=== Transport ===
The Rennsteig Railway running to Rennsteig station near Schmiedefeld is a branch line, that has not been regularly used by passenger trains since 1998.

=== Rennsteig Run ===
Since 1973 the GutsMuths Rennsteig Run, an organised ultramarathon, has taken place on the Rennsteig. With more than 14,000 participating runners and walkers it is one of the largest events of its type in Europe.

== Literature ==
- Otto Ludwig: The Rennsteig, Greifenverlag, Rudolstadt 1974–1991, ISBN 3-7352-0223-3
