= Schmiedefeld =

Schmiedefeld is the name of the following populated places:

- Schmiedefeld (Lichtetal), a municipality in Saalfeld-Rudolstadt district, Thuringia
- Schmiedefeld am Rennsteig, a municipality in Ilm-Kreis district, Thuringia
