= Spitter =

Spitter may refer to:

- Spitter (river), a stream and waterfall in Thuringia, Germany
- Spitball, an illegal baseball pitch
  - Me and the Spitter, a book by Gaylord Perry about throwing the pitch
- Spitter, a person who has the habit of spitting
- Spitter, a person who places meat on a roasting spit
- Spitter, a fictional Dilophosaurus in Jurassic Park
- Spitter, a type of special infected from Left 4 Dead 2
- Spitter, a classification of cider apple

== See also ==
- Spittoon, a receptacle for spitting
