= Rennsteig Cycle Path =

Cycle route in Germany

Sign for the Rennsteig Cycle Path

The Rennsteig Cycle Path (German: Rennsteig-Radwanderweg) follows for 195 km the Rennsteig trail that has existed at least since the Middle Ages as a courier and trade route. Most of this long distance cycle path is carefully ballasted, although parts of it also run along quiet country lanes. On the crest of the Thuringian Highland the cycle path is identical for long stretches with the hiking trail of the same name, but departs from it in places so that steep inclines can be avoided. It starts at Hörschel west of Eisenach and ends in Blankenstein by the River Saale.

== Literature ==
- Rennsteig Radwanderweg, 1 : 50 000, Verlag grünes herz. ISBN 978-3-929993-62-2
- Radwanderkarte Rennsteig-Radwanderweg, 1 : 50 000, Publicpress-Verlag, ISBN 978-3-89920-304-2
