= Ravensberg (Harz) =

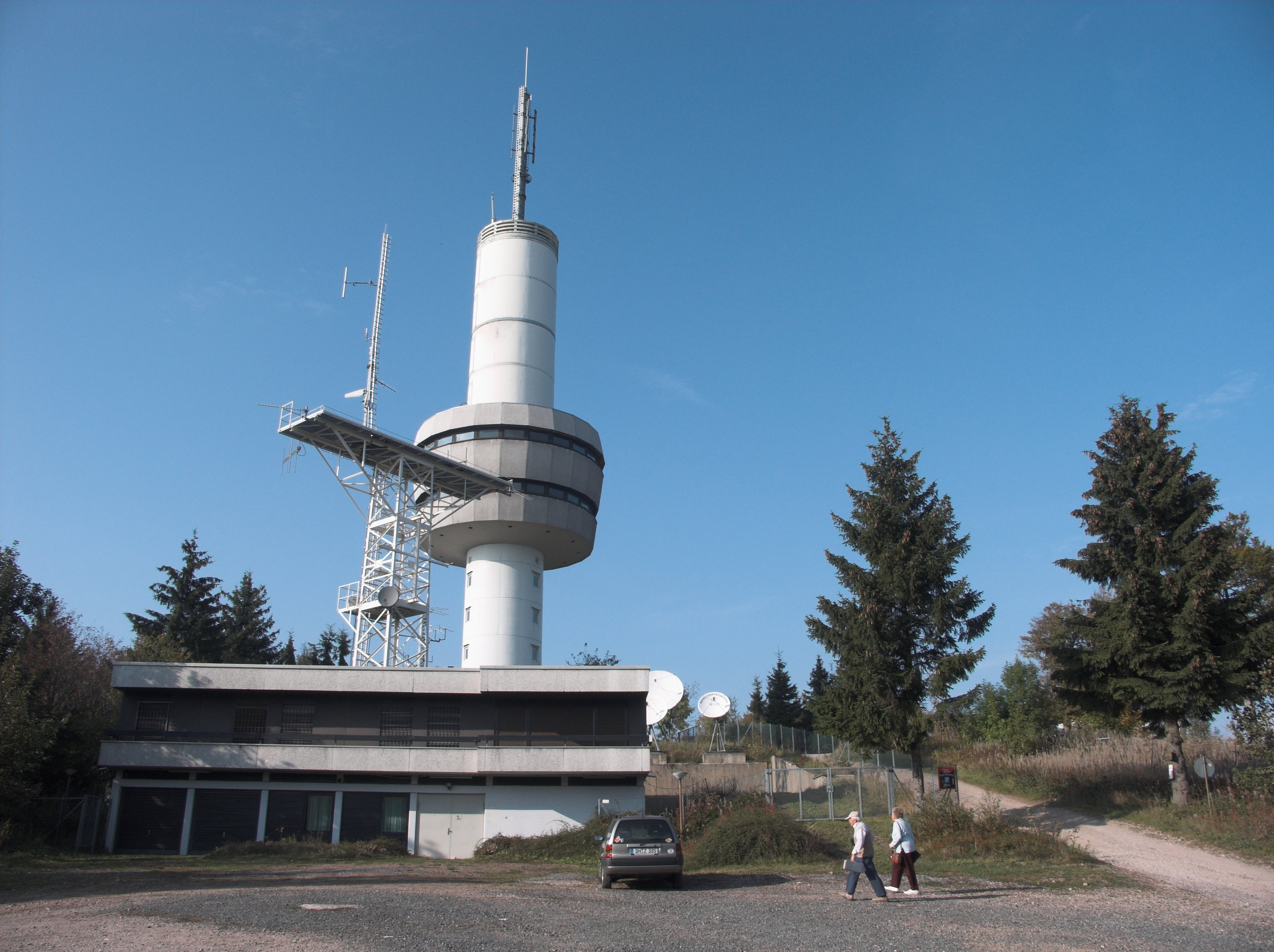

Highest point
- Elevation: 659 m (2,162 ft)
- Coordinates: 51°37′17″N 10°31′37″E

Geography
- Location within Lower Saxony
- Location: Göttingen, Lower Saxony, Germany
- Parent range: Harz

The Ravensberg is a 659 m high mountain in the South Harz mountains in the German state of Lower Saxony. It is relatively isolated and visible for a long way. It lies in the district of Göttingen, north of Bad Sachsa.

The mountain top is crowned with a prominent 64 m high tower, which was built in 1970. This tower acted as a listening post during the Cold War; today it is used by Deutsche Telekom.

The Ravensberg is widely considered a beautiful viewing point, and is also very easy to get to by car, a road about 3.5 km long, running up to the summit from Bad Sachsa. There is an old boundary stone, the Dreiherrenstein, on this road shortly before the summit. Until 1866 this was where the borders of the Kingdom of Prussia, Kingdom of Hanover and Duchy of Brunswick met. Today the Dreiherrenstein is the starting point for several walks, mountain bike routes and the South Harz cross-country skiing trail that runs, for example, to the Stöberhai mountain and town of Braunlage. On the summit is a restaurant catering for day-trippers. There is also a skiing area with several downhill runs and three lifts.

== Gallery ==
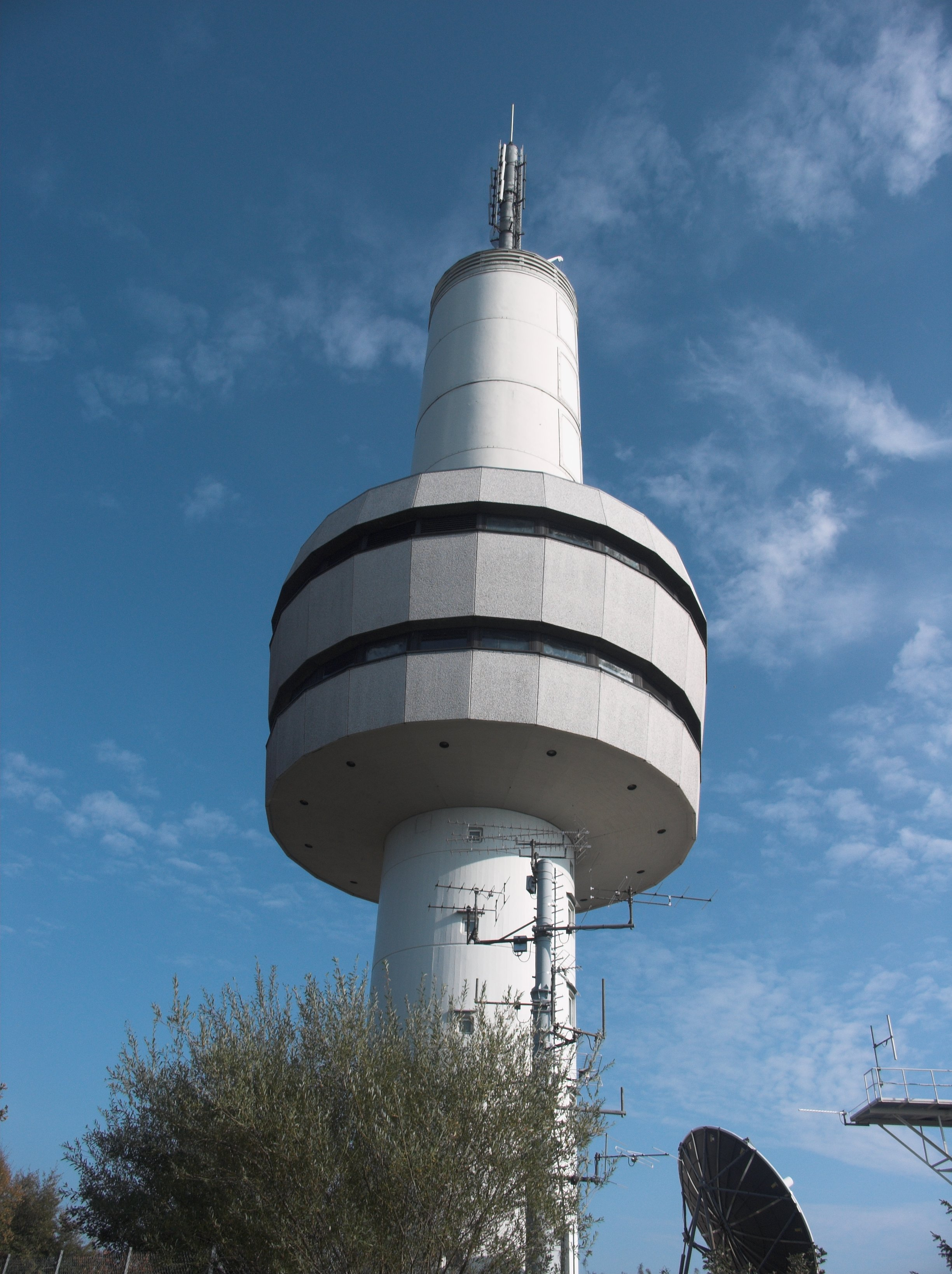
Transmission tower

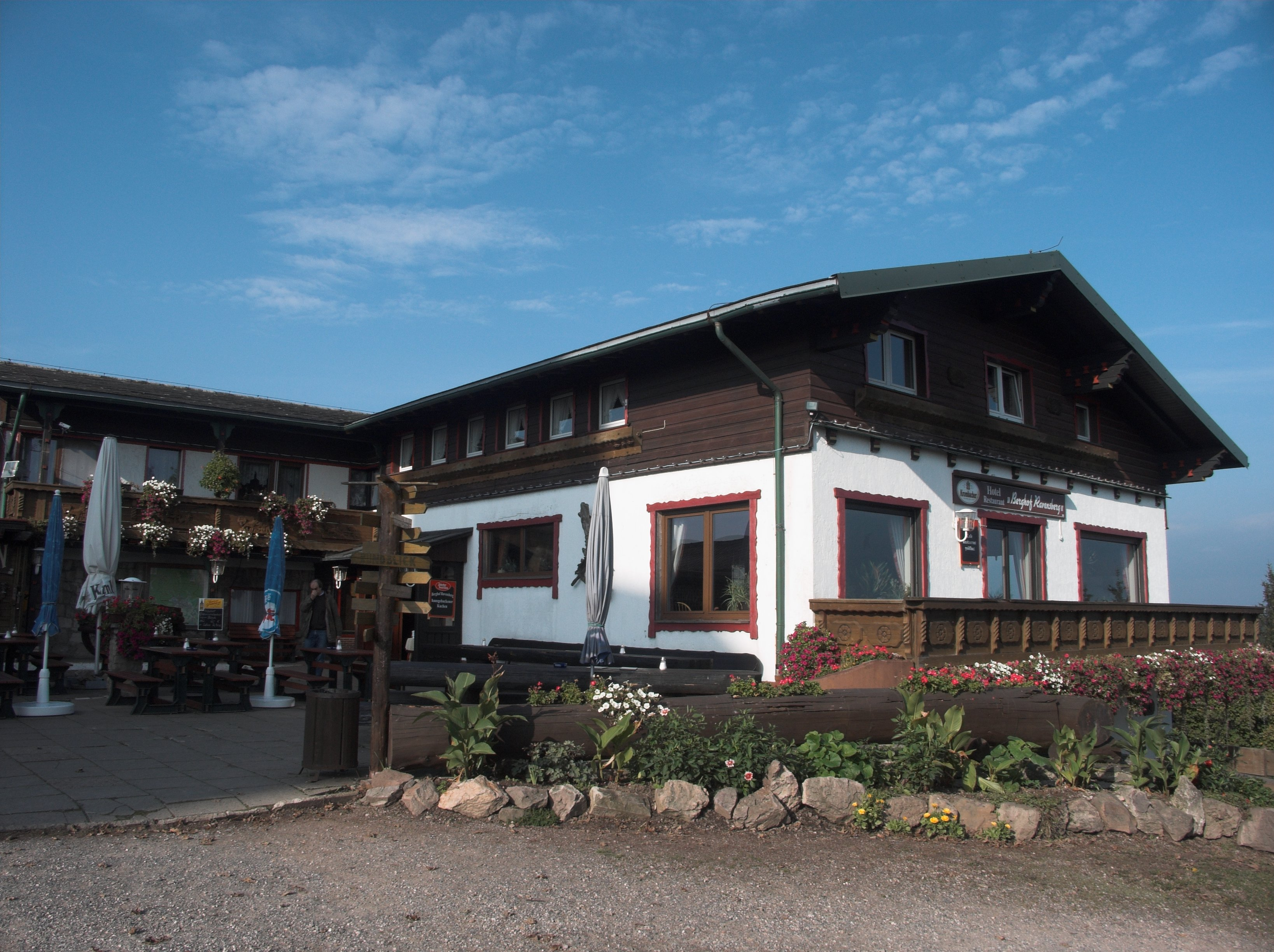
Mountain restaurant

== See also ==
- List of mountains and hills in Lower Saxony
