= Dreifürstenstein =

Mountain in Baden-Württemberg, Germany

Coordinates: 48°22′23″N 9°02′38″E

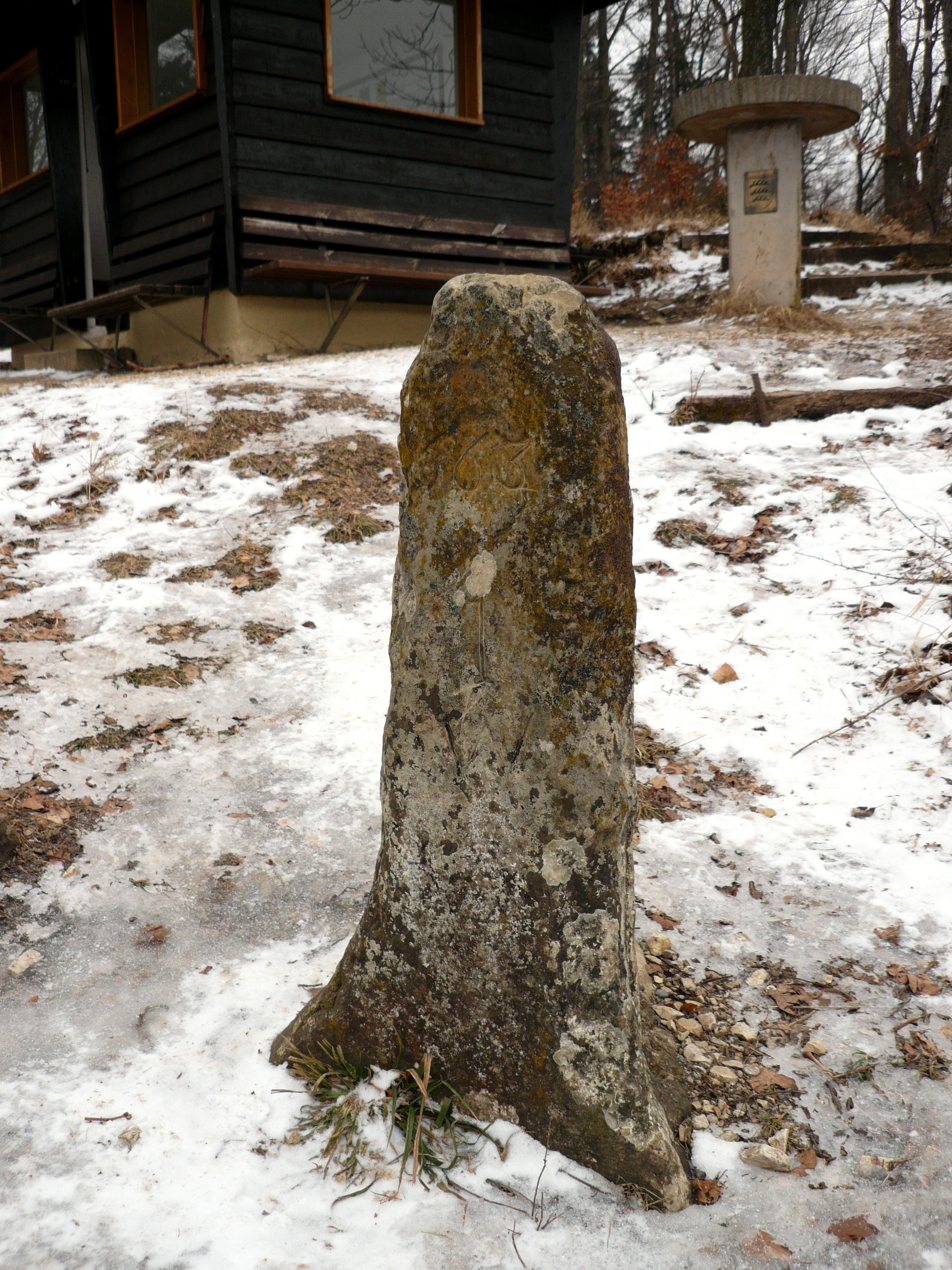
- The 17th century triangular border stone on the summit of Dreifuerstenstein

Highest point
- Elevation: 854 m above sea level (NHN) (2,802 ft)

Geography
- Location: Zollernalbkreis, Baden-Württemberg, Germany

Dreifürstenstein is a mountain in Zollernalbkreis, Baden-Württemberg, Germany.
