= Sohland an der Spree =

Sohland an der Spree/Załom
- Municipality
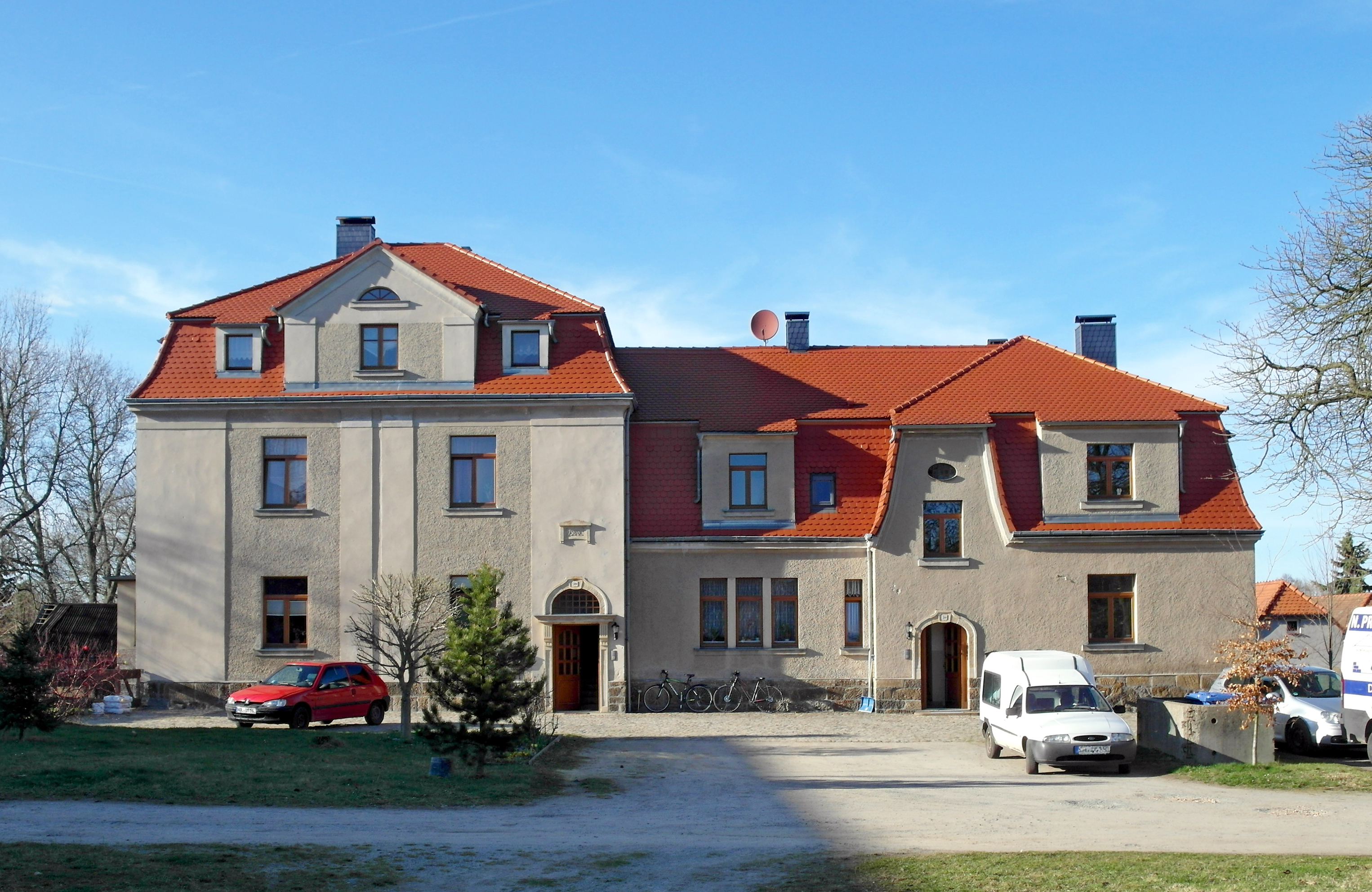
- Manor house in Obersohland

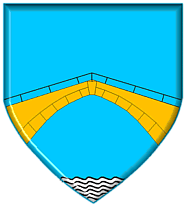
- Coat of arms

- Location of Sohland an der Spree/Załom within Bautzen district
- Interactive map of Sohland an der Spree/Załom
- Location within Germany Location within Saxony
- Coordinates: 51°2′50″N 14°25′42″E
- Country: Germany
- State: Saxony
- District: Bautzen
- Subdivisions: 10

Government
  - Mayor (2022–29): Hagen Israel (Ind.)

Area
  - Total: 37.3 km^{2} (14.4 sq mi)
- Elevation: 302 m (991 ft)

Population (2025-12-31)
  - Total: 6,187
  - Density: 166/km^{2} (430/sq mi)
- Time zone: UTC+01:00 (CET)
  - Summer (DST): UTC+02:00 (CEST)
- Postal codes: 02686–02689
- Dialling codes: 035936
- Vehicle registration: BZ, BIW, HY, KM
- Website: www.sohland.de

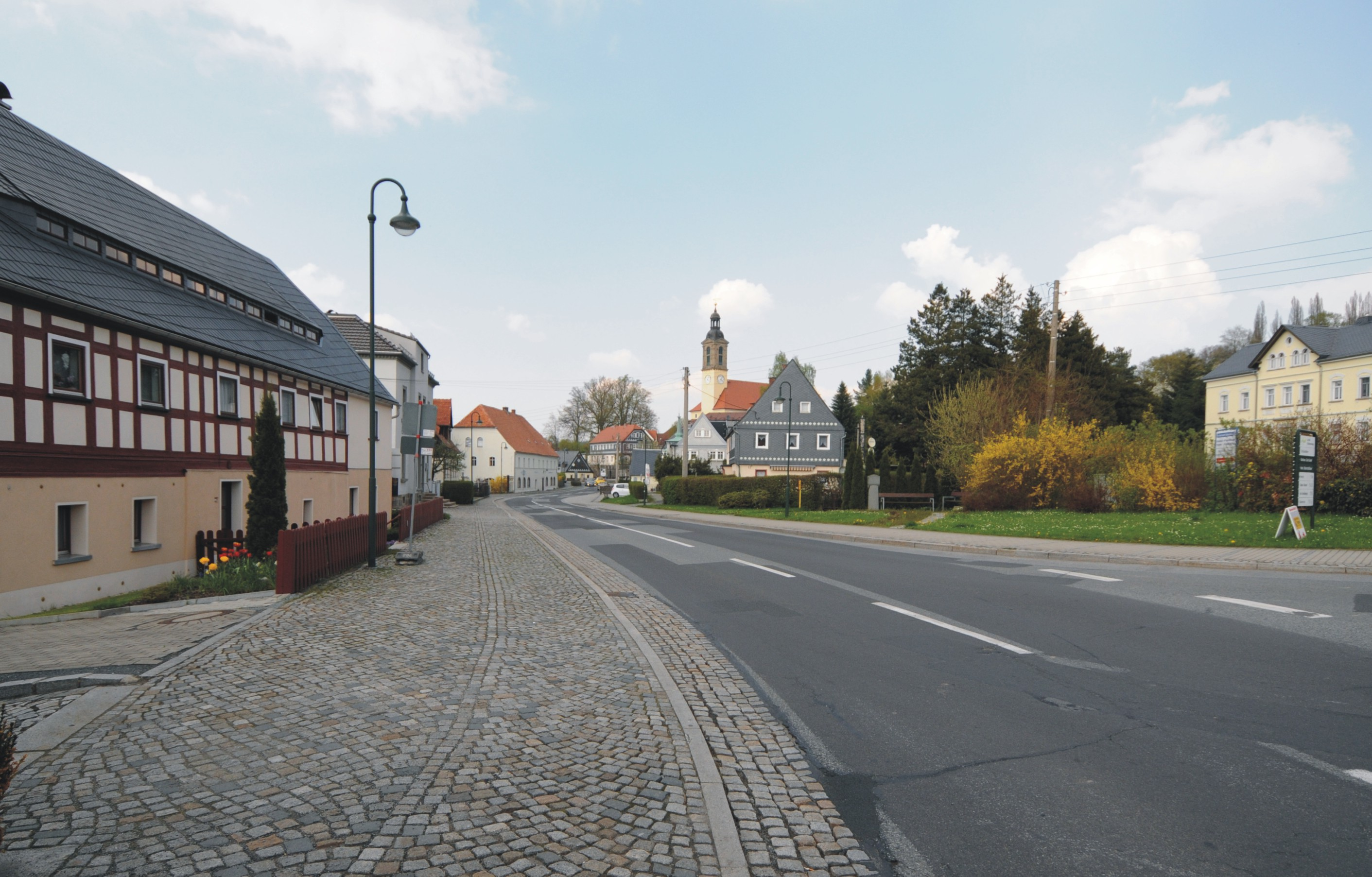
Townscape of Sohland with Church

Sohland an der Spree (German, pronounced [ˈzoːlant ʔan deːɐ̯ ˈʃpʁeː], lit. 'Sohland on the Spree') or Załom (Upper Sorbian, pronounced [ˈzawɔm]) is a municipality in the district of Bautzen in Saxony, Germany near the border of the Czech Republic in a region called Lusatia. The river Spree flows through the village. Together with some smaller villages (Wehrsdorf, Taubenheim) it constitutes one of the biggest villages or communities with about 7,700 inhabitants. The most iconic monument of the village is the "Himmelsbrücke" (Heaven's Bridge); it is said that the bridge will break when someone tells a lie while standing on it.

== Population ==
In 2011, the population of the municipality was 7,076 and the average age was 48.

== Sights ==
In each of the three villages of the community one will find a Lutheran church. In Wehrsdorf a Baroque-style church was built in 1724. In Taubenheim is another from the 16th century (maybe one of the oldest Lutheran churches in Germany) and in Sohland a church whose oldest parts date from the 13th century. All these churches have a beautifully cultivated cemetery nearby.

The region of Upper Lusatia, where Sohland can be found, is famous because of its special timber-frame houses which combine the Franconian and Slavic styles of wooden houses. They are built like "a house in a house". Many of these special buildings still stand there; most of them date from between 1870 and 1890. In Sohland there is also an old type of these houses which is several hundred years old. Today it is a small museum (Heimatmuseum) of the rural culture of the region.

The Schloss Mittelsohland was built in 1747, also with a park. After 1945 it was a refugee camp and in the GDR a hospital; renovated in 1995, the building is currently unused.

== Economic structure ==
Even though the economic situation in the whole of Eastern Germany and especially in the region of Upper Lusatia is not that good, Sohland is quite successful in economic things, at least in comparison with other towns and villages of the region. The infrastructure is not bad. There is direct access to Bundesstraße 96 and the village has a railway station. For some years now Sohland has had direct access to the Czech Republic by car (but no trucks are allowed).

Because of the beauty of the village and abundant free space to build new houses many young families come to live here. There are also some new projects for renters and older people. This way the community was able to minimize the loss of inhabitants over the last fifteen years, even though eastern Saxony lost many of its people because of a high rate of unemployment and a negative birth-death-ratio. But maybe the emigration will come to a halt in the next years because of the extremely low number of newborn children.

There are also some industrial firms in the village, they produce:

- furniture (Wehrsdorfer Werkstätten)
- plastic products (Jokey Plastic Sohland GmbH, Augst Kunststoff-Produkte Wehrsdorf GmbH, Schicketanz GmbH)
- machines (Kran- und Stahlbau Paulick GmbH, Walterscheidt GmbH)
- foods (Lausitzer Früchteverarbeitung GmbH)

There are also some logistical firms, and a lot of service firms too. One of the new industrial foundations of the last years is a small enterprise, which produces fuels on the basis of agricultural goods.

== Education ==
All three villages still have a "Grundschule" (class 1 to 4), a mixed Haupt-/Mittelschule (comparable with a lower High school) can be found nearby (Gerhard-Hauptmann- Schule). For further education pupils have to go to Wilthen, where it is possible to attend a Gymnasium (comparable with an upper High school). Most schools that existed before 1990 were closed in the last 15 years because of economic reasons and the now lower number of pupils.

== Religion ==
On the Stausee (lake) is the municipality centre of the Sohland Evangelical Free Church.

== Twin cities ==
- Rocca Priora, Italy

== Sons and daughters of the community ==
- Evelin Kaufer (born 1953), athlete, sprinter 4 x 100 metres relay
