= Ebertswiese =

Conservation area in Thuringia, Germany

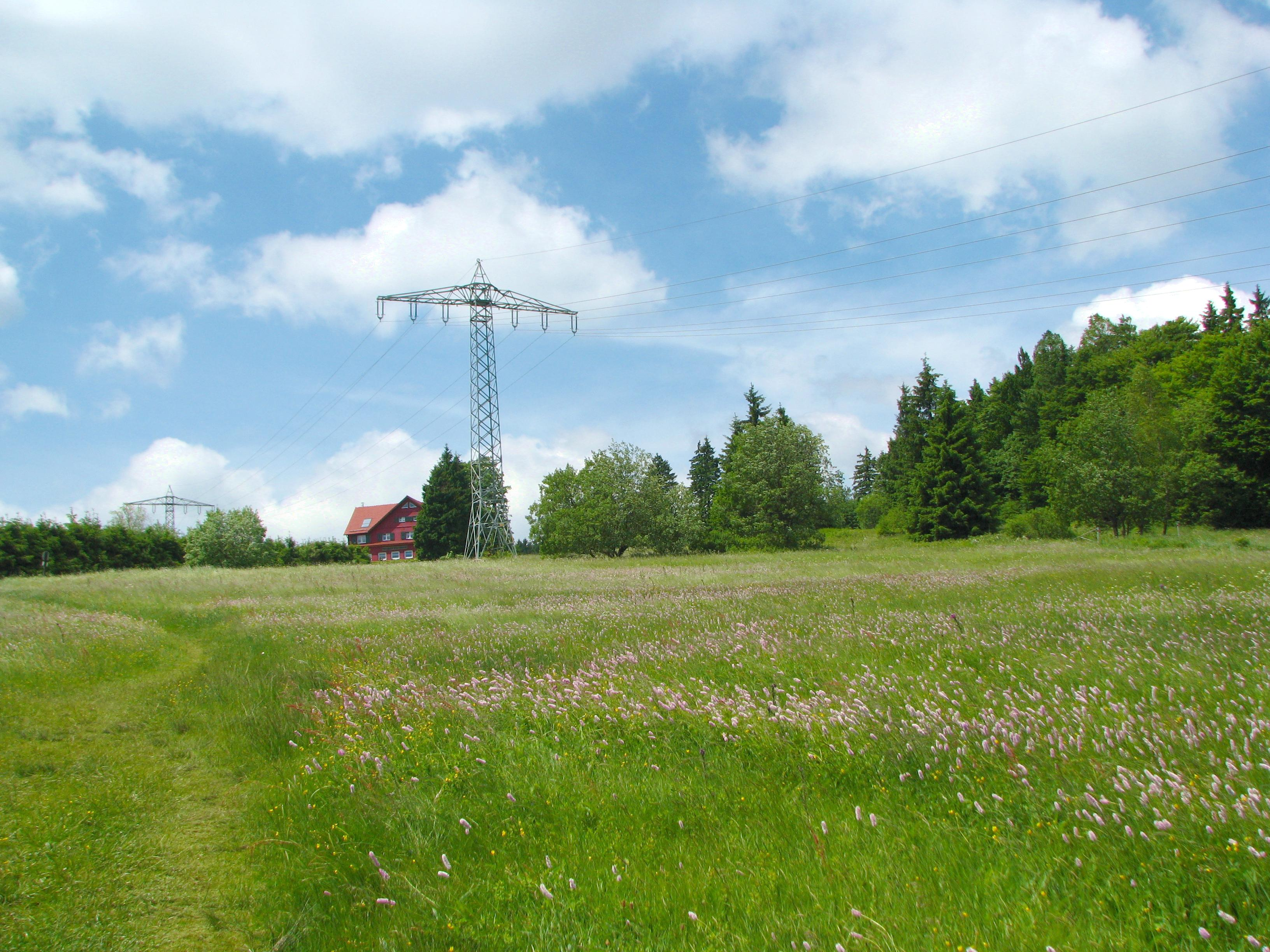
Ebertswiese, 2010

The Ebertswiese (literally: Ebert Meadow), is a boggy area of grassland in the Thuringian Forest in central Germany. It has been a nature conservation area since 1936 and is a recreation area in the municipality of Floh-Seligenthal on the Rennsteig trail. The River Spitter has its source within the reserve.

In addition to the Ebertswiese mountain hotel, the Bergseebaude guest house and various walking huts the main destination is the Bergsee lake, which was created in 1900 from a disused quarry. The introduction of a water wheel ended the quarrying, but has since pleased swimmers.

In the vicinity of the Ebertswiese are the Dreiherrenstein am Hangweg (boundary stone marking the duchies of Saxe-Weimar-Eisenach and Saxe-Coburg and Gotha and Kurhessen), dating from 1586, and the Spitter Waterfall (Thuringia's highest natural waterfall).

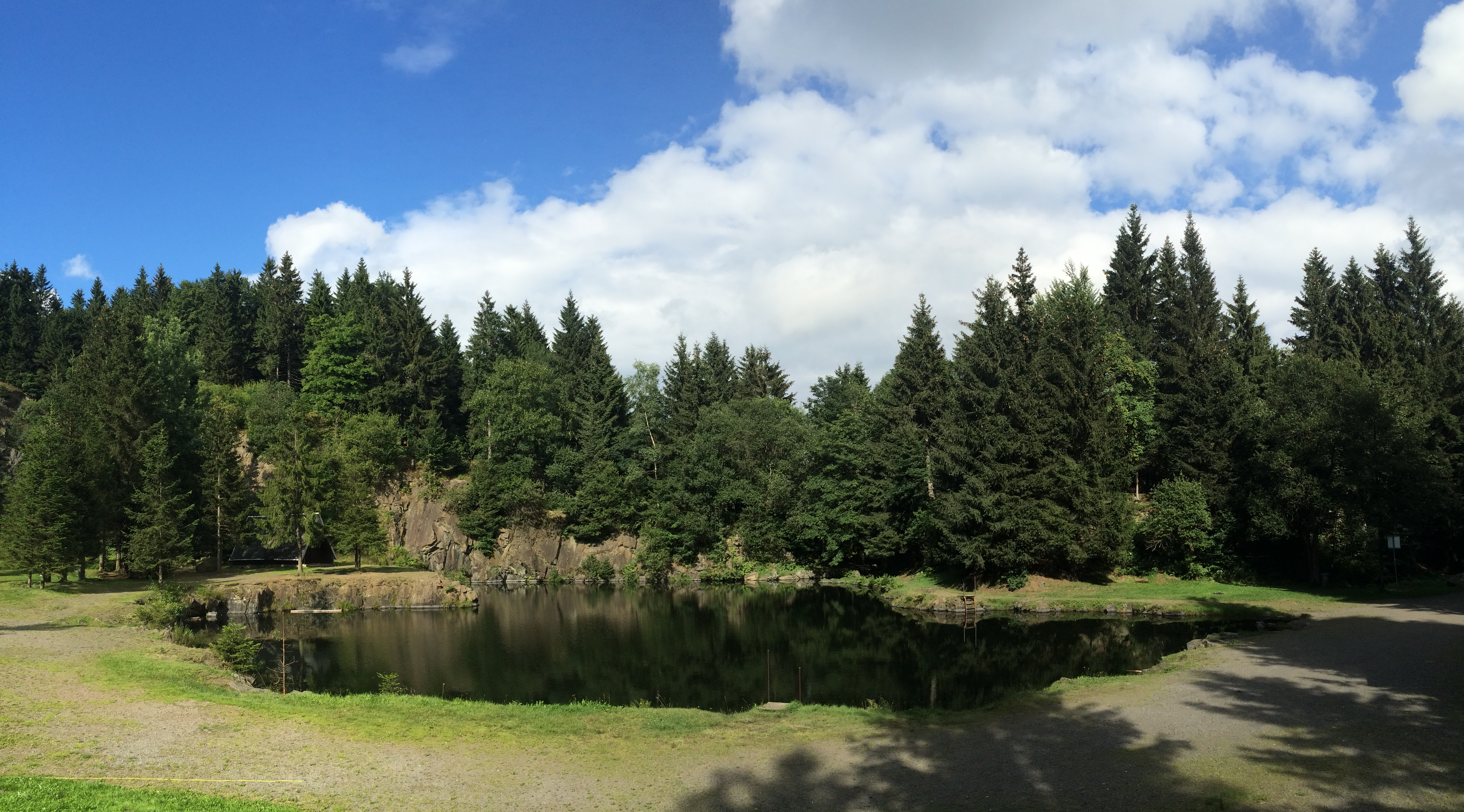
Highland lake in the former quarry at the Ebertswiese

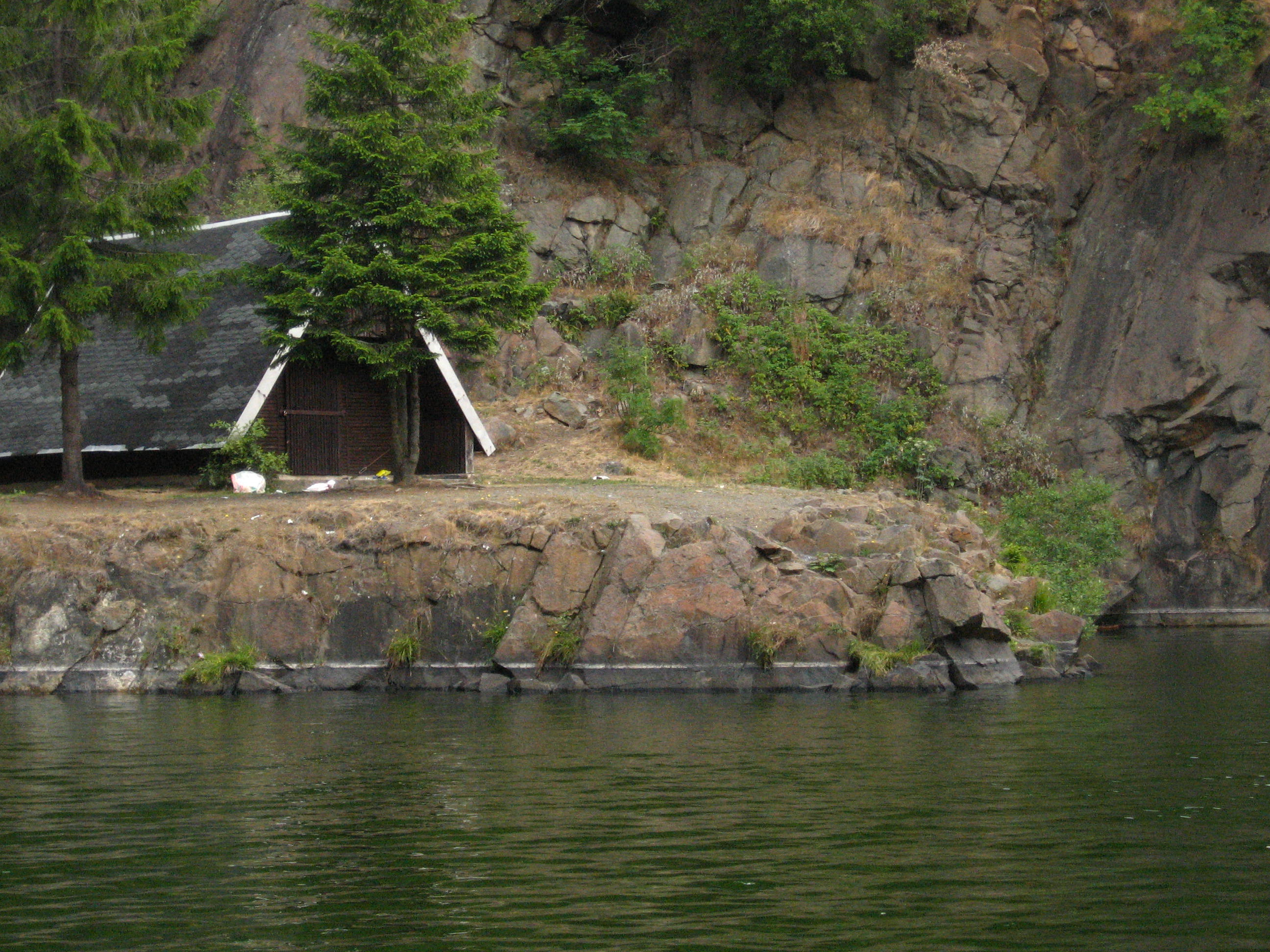
Lake in summer

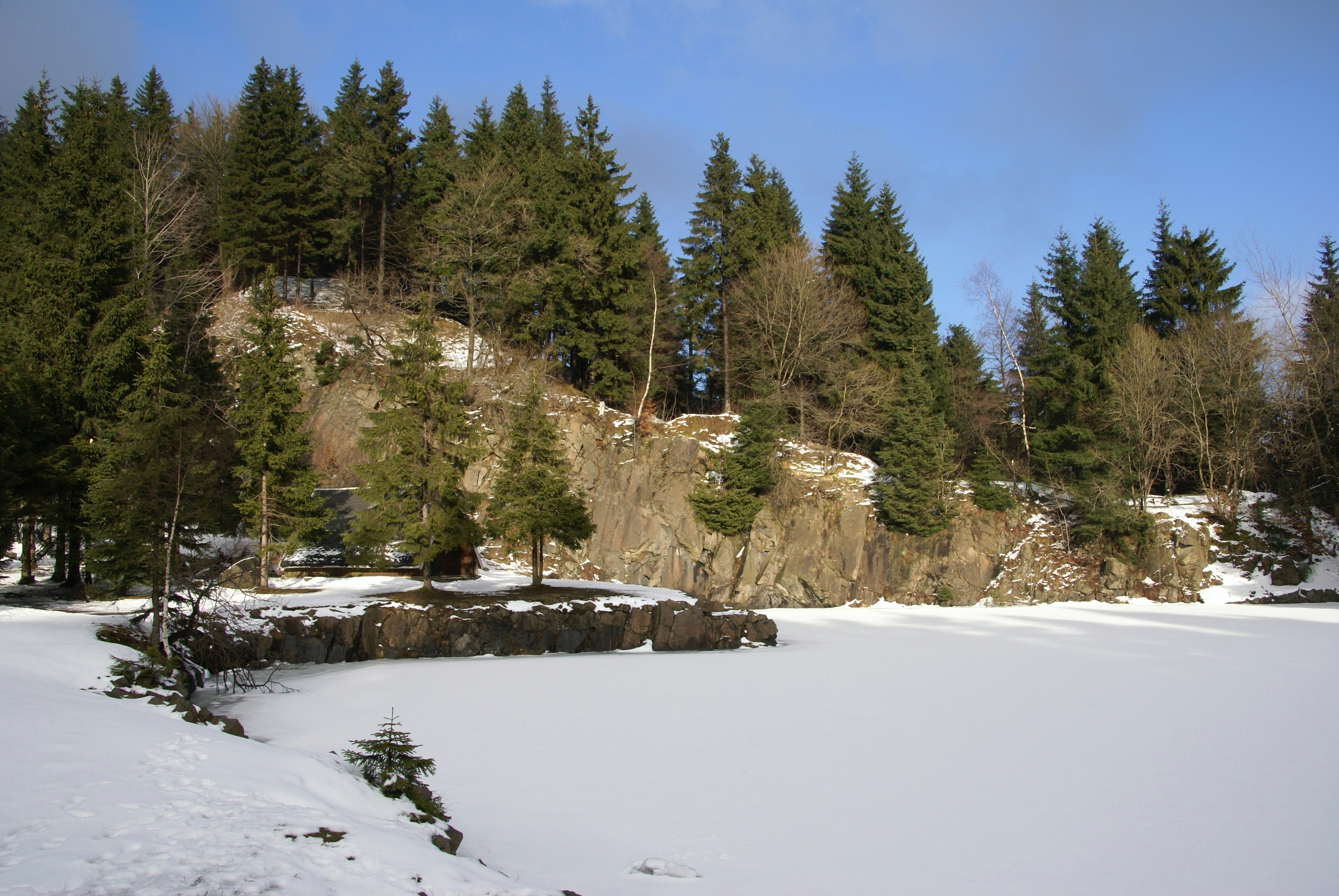
Lake in winter
