= Schmiedefeld am Rennsteig =

- Ortsteil of Suhl
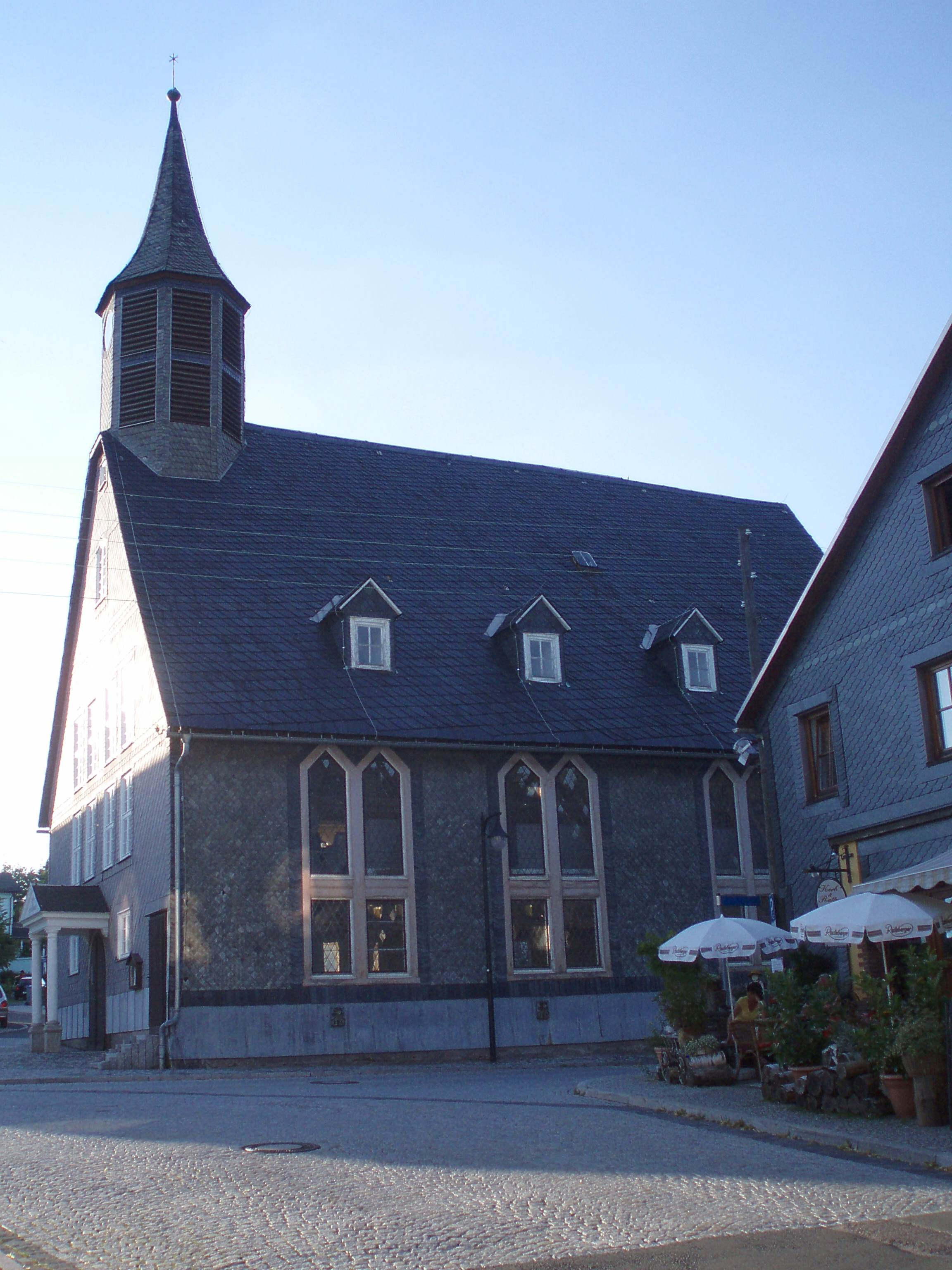

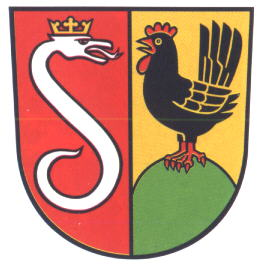
- Coat of arms

- Location of Schmiedefeld am Rennsteig within Suhl
- Interactive map of Schmiedefeld am Rennsteig
- Location within Germany Location within Thuringia
- Coordinates: 50°36′32″N 10°48′47″E
- Country: Germany
- State: Thuringia
- Town: Suhl

Area
  - Total: 18.17 km^{2} (7.02 sq mi)
- Elevation: 700 m (2,300 ft)

Population (2017-12-31)
  - Total: 1,653
  - Density: 90.97/km^{2} (235.6/sq mi)
- Time zone: UTC+01:00 (CET)
  - Summer (DST): UTC+02:00 (CEST)
- Postal codes: 98711
- Dialling codes: 036782
- Website: www.schmiedefeld.de

Schmiedefeld am Rennsteig (German pronunciation: [ˈʃmiːdəfɛlt ʔam ˈʁɛnʃtaɪk], lit. 'Schmiedefeld on the Rennsteig') is a village and a former municipality in Thuringia, Germany. Formerly in the district Ilm-Kreis, it is part of the town Suhl since January 2019.

== Gallery ==
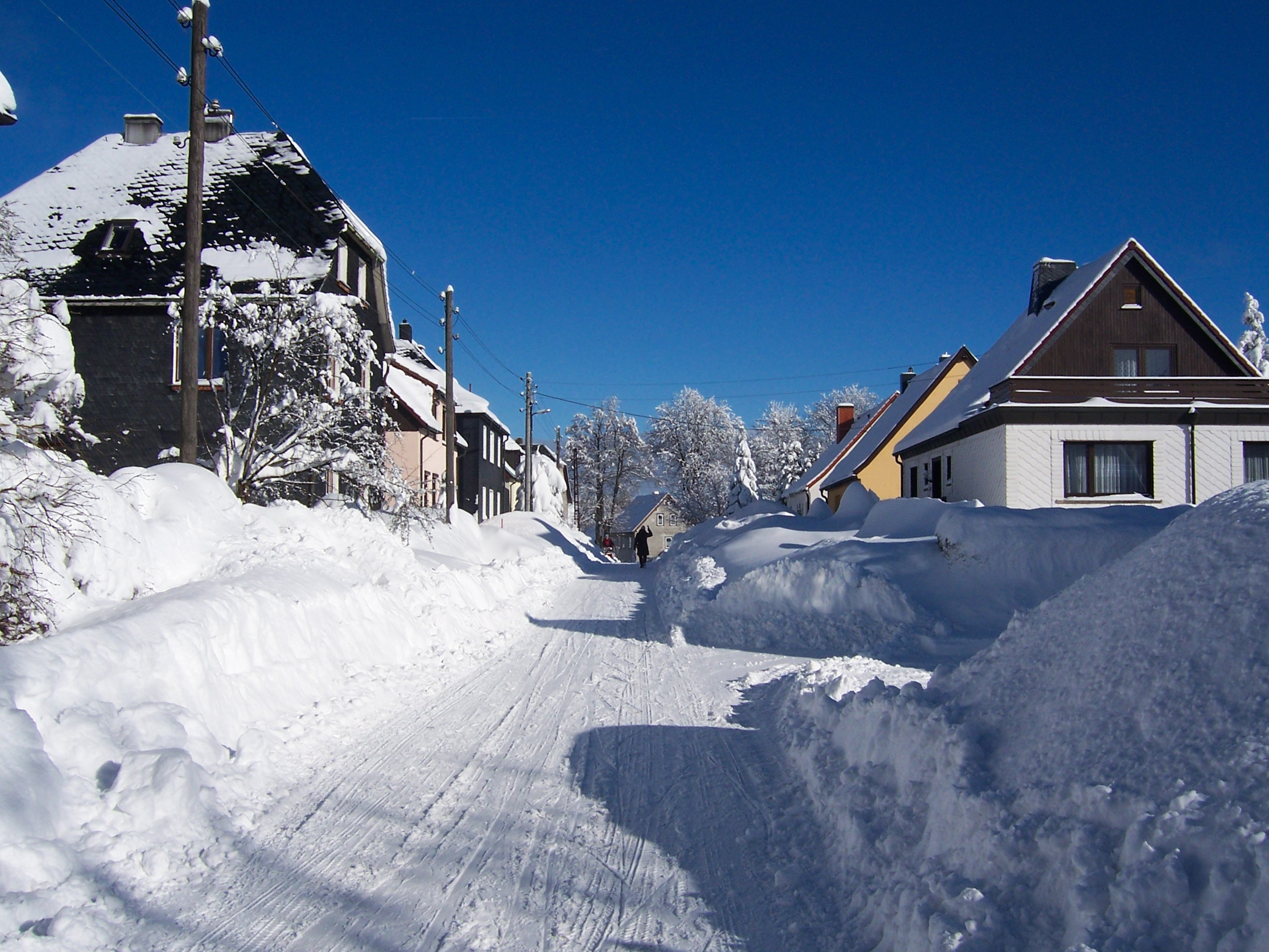
Schmiedefeld am Rennsteig in winter

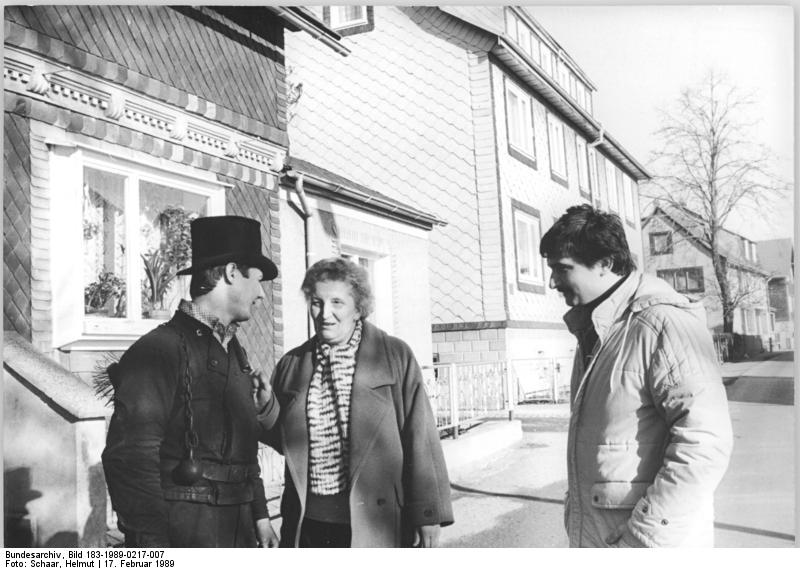
The Chimney sweep, of Schmiedefeld, 1989
