= Spitter (river) =

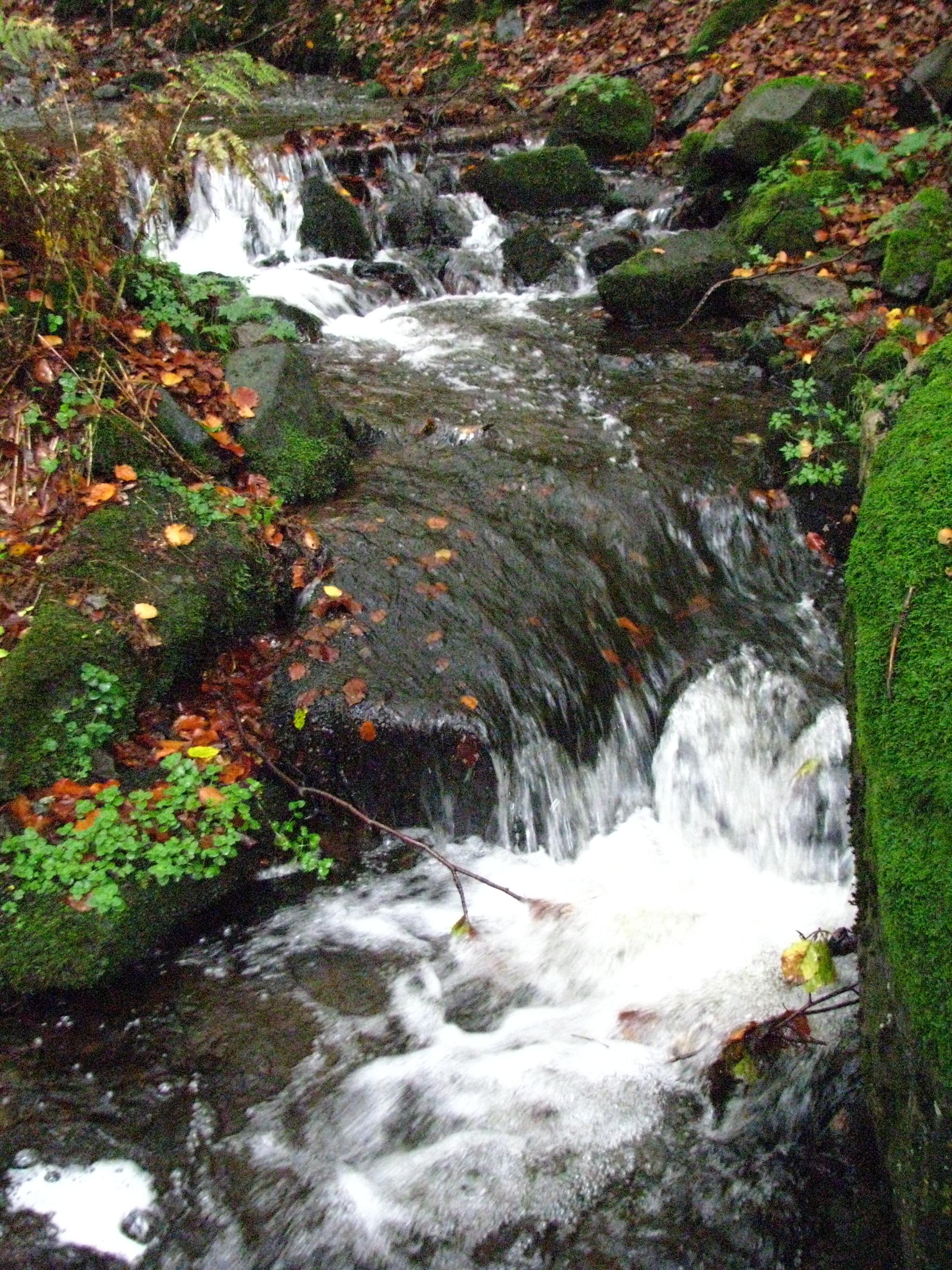
- Small cascades, typical of the upper reaches of the Spitter

Location
- Country: Germany
- State: Thuringia
- District: Gotha

Physical characteristics
- Source
  - coordinates: 50°47′7″N 10°31′53″E
  - elevation: ca. 765 m above sea level (NN)
- Mouth
  - location: in Tambach-Dietharz into the Apfelstädt
  - coordinates: 50°47′43″N 10°36′55″E
  - elevation: 432.8 m above sea level (NN)

Basin features
- Progression: Apfelstädt→ Gera→ Unstrut→ Saale→ Elbe→ North Sea
- Landmarks: Small towns: Tambach-Dietharz

The Spitter is a stream near Tambach-Dietharz in the Thuringian Forest in Germany. It flows through the Spitter Valley and has the highest waterfall in Thuringia. The course of the Spitter crosses the Rennsteig in the area of the Ebertswiese nature reserve and is the only stream along the route of the Rennsteig.

== Spitter Waterfall ==
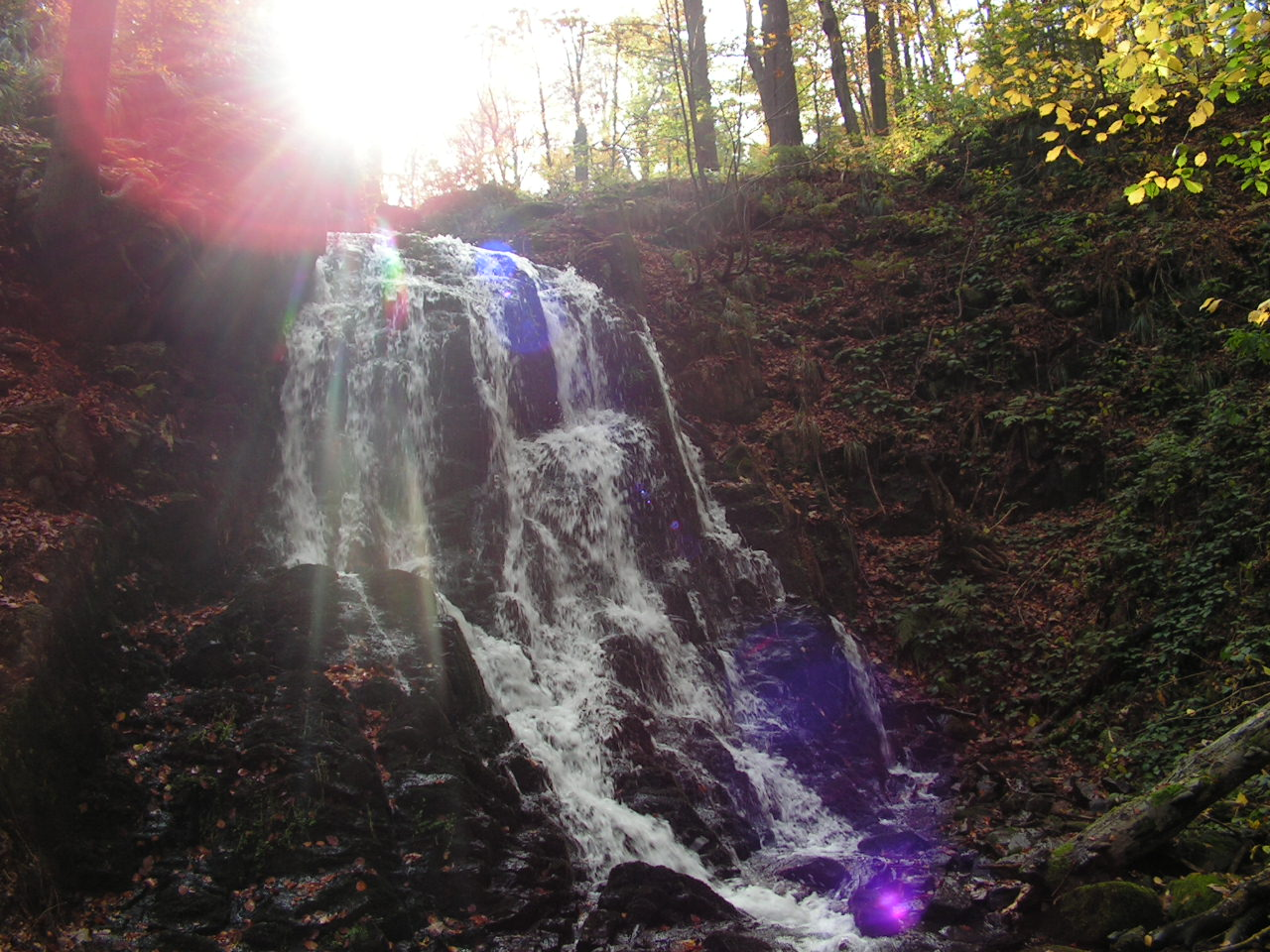
Spitter Waterfall

The Spitter Waterfall (German: Spitterfall) is the highest natural waterfall in the German state of Thuringia, with a drop of 19 metres (62 ft).

The Spitter Waterfall is located below the hillwalking trail of the Rennsteig and tumbles down four cascade steps, through a notch in the floor of an ice-age hollow on the northern side of the Thuringian Forest.

The waterfall is part of the Spitter stream. The source of the Spitter lies only 1.5 kilometres (0.93 mi) away on the Ebertswiese, a nature reserve lying at a height of about 750–800 metres (2,460–2,620 ft) on the boundary of the districts of Schmalkalden-Meiningen and Gotha. The Spitter Waterfall itself is in the district of Gotha.
