= Wehrsdorf =

Village in Saxony, Germany

Coordinates: 51°03′N 14°23′E

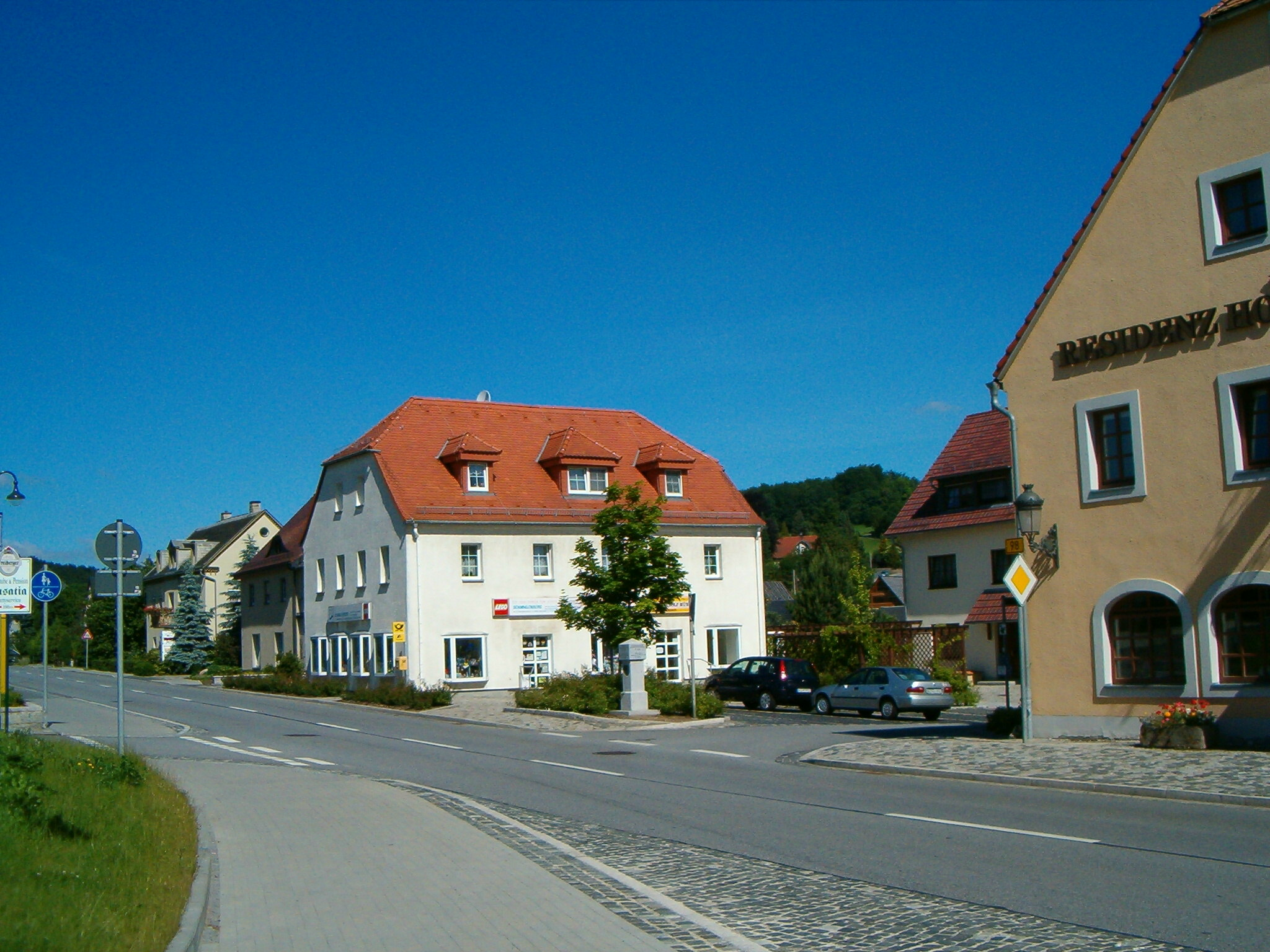

Wehrsdorf (German) or Wernarjecy (Upper Sorbian) is a small village in a valley of the Lusatian Highlands in the region of Upper Lusatia (Oberlausitz) in Saxony, Germany. It has about 1,776 inhabitants and belongs to an administrative community of three different villages, with Sohland an der Spree and Taubenheim. This community is offícially called Sohland after the largest of these villages. Altogether, the community has about 7,700 inhabitants. The village is near the border to the Czech Republic.

== Monuments ==
The most important building in the village is a Lutheran church, built in 1725 in the Baroque style. The tower is more than 40 meters high and sends its greetings over the valleys of the region. Near the church is an old cemetery with its typical flowered graves. The most important architectural heritage of the southern part of Upper Lusatia is the so-called "Umgebindehäuser", special, half-timbered houses which unite the differences of the Slavic and the Franconian styles of wood houses. Most of the present houses were built between 1850-1890.

== Religion ==
Most people are still atheists, as in the time of official Socialism, but there is also a Lutheran tradition and most people are linked to this religion, as well as a strong Catholic minority. Upper Lusatia is typically a religious mixed region.

== Economy ==
In the time before reunification in 1990, the village was still a typical "Saxon industrial village" with four big and several small enterprises, all state-owned. They produced furniture, clothing, metal instruments and more. After the reunification, most of the firms were not able to survive; only the firm that produced furnitures still exists. The high rate of unemployment today is also the primary reason why so many people have left the region. But in comparison with other villages of Upper Lusatia, Wehrsdorf is still well off.

Before 1990, Upper Lusatia was a tourist area, and tourism is still important. There are four restaurants, a hotel (****) and several private bed-and-breakfasts.

=== Historical Population ===
| Year | Population |
| 1547 | 36 Hufners |
| 1777 | 18 Hufners, 53 gardeners, 122 tenant farmers |
| 1834 | 1436 |
| 1871 | 2207 |
| 1890 | 2300 |
| 1910 | 2351 |
| 1925 | 2357 |
| 1939 | 2331 |
| 1946 | 2614 |
| 1950 | 2740 |
| 1964 | 2670 |
| 1990 | 1900 |

Quelle: http://hov.isgv.de/Wehrsdorf
