= Dreistromstein =

Coordinates: 50°28′22″N 11°2′14″E

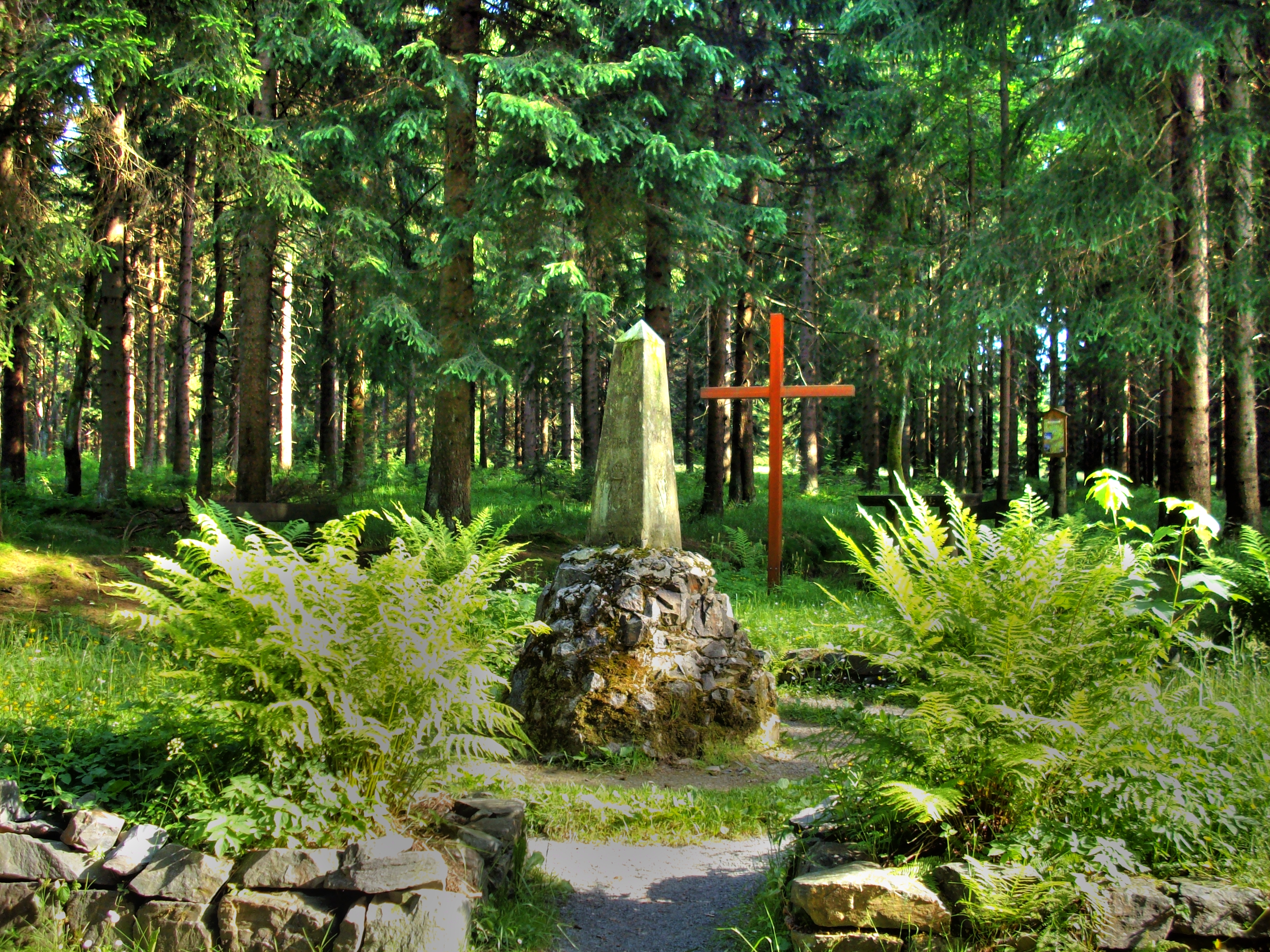
Dreistromstein, 2012

The Dreistromstein (Three Rivers Stone) is a three-sided obelisk that has marked the watershed of the Weser, Elbe and Rhine rivers in the Thuringian Forest since 1906. The base of the obelisk is made of stone typical of each of the river systems—Elbe: granite; Weser: greywacke; Rhein: quartz.

Opposite the Dreistromstein is the Kleiner Dreiherrenstein (Little Three Lords Stone) or Dreiherrenstein am Saarzipfel (Three Lords Stone at Saarzipfel) from 1733, which marks the border of the duchies of Saxe-Meiningen and Saxe-Hildburghausen and the principality of Schwarzburg-Rudolstadt.

== See also ==
- Dreiherrnstein
