= Siegmundsburg =

- Ortsteil of Neuhaus am Rennweg
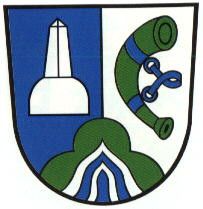
- Coat of arms
- Interactive map of Siegmundsburg
- Location within Germany Location within Thuringia
- Coordinates: 50°28′N 11°3′E
- Country: Germany
- State: Thuringia
- District: Sonneberg
- Town: Neuhaus am Rennweg

Area
  - Total: 15.28 km^{2} (5.90 sq mi)
- Elevation: 775 m (2,543 ft)

Population (2011-12-31)
  - Total: 227
  - Density: 14.9/km^{2} (38.5/sq mi)
- Time zone: UTC+01:00 (CET)
  - Summer (DST): UTC+02:00 (CEST)
- Postal codes: 98749
- Dialling codes: 036704
- Vehicle registration: SON
- Website: www.siegmundsburg.de

Siegmundsburg is a former municipality in the Sonneberg district of Thuringia, Germany. Since 31 December 2012, it is part of the town Neuhaus am Rennweg.
