= Zimmerbach (disambiguation) =

Zimmerbach is a commune in the Haut-Rhin department in Grand Est in France.

Zimmerbach may also refer to:

- Zimmerbach (Salza), a river of Thuringia, Germany, tributary of the Salza
- Zimmerbach (Starzel), a river of Baden-Württemberg, Germany, tributary of the Starzel
