= Ohne =

Ohne may refer to:

- Õhne, a river of Estonia and Latvia
- Ohne, Germany, a community in Lower Saxony, Germany
- Ohne (Wipper), a river of Thuringia, Germany, tributary of the Wipper
