= Scherkonde =

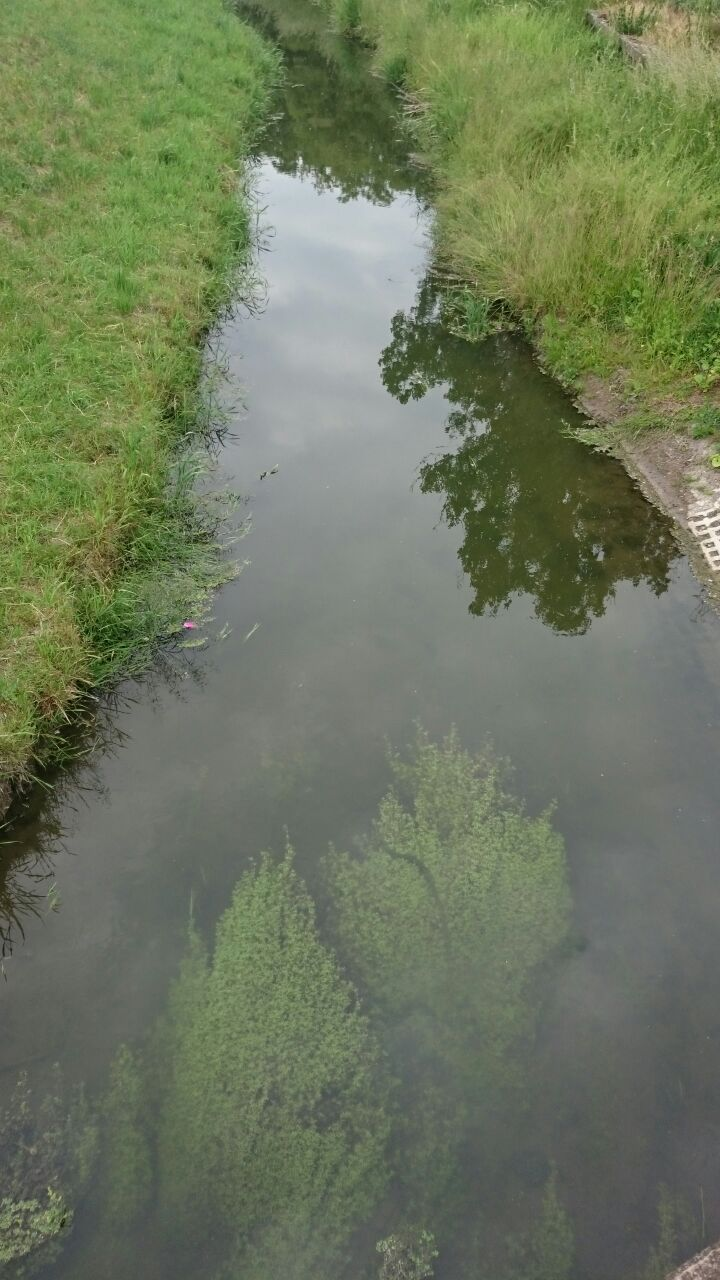

Location
- Country: Germany
- States: Thuringia

Physical characteristics
- Mouth
  - location: Lossa
  - coordinates: 51.1833°N 11.1726°E

Basin features
- Progression: Lossa→ Unstrut→ Saale→ Elbe→ North Sea

Scherkonde is a river of Thuringia, Germany. It flows into the Lossa near Sömmerda.

== See also ==
- List of rivers of Thuringia
