= Oelze =

Oelze may refer to:

- Oelze (river) of Thuringia, Germany
- Oelze (de), a village in the municipality Katzhütte, Germany

== People ==
- Richard Oelze (1900–1980), German painter
- Christiane Oelze (born 1963), German soprano
