= Neubrunn =

Neubrunn may refer to:

- Neubrunn, Lower Franconia, a municipality in Lower Franconia, Bavaria, Germany
- Neubrunn, Thuringia, a municipality in Thuringia, Germany
- Neubrunn (river), a river of Thuringia, Germany
