= Schwarza =

Schwarza may refer to several places and rivers in Germany and Austria:

- Schwarza (Black Forest), a river of Baden-Württemberg, Germany, tributary of the Schlücht
- Schwarza (Hasel), a river of Thuringia, Germany, tributary of the Hasel
- Schwarza (Ilm), a river of Thuringia, Germany, tributary of the Ilm
- Schwarza (Saale), a river of Thuringia, Germany, tributary of the Saale
- Schwarza (Leitha), a river of Austria, tributary of the Leitha
- Schwarza, part of Rudolstadt, Germany
- Schwarza, Thuringia, a municipality near Meiningen, Thuringia, Germany
