= Zeilbach =

Zeilbach may refer to:

- Zeilbach, Feldatal, a district of the community Feldatal in Hesse, Germany
- Zeilbach (Werra), a river of Thuringia, Germany, tributary of the Werra
