= Rosabach =

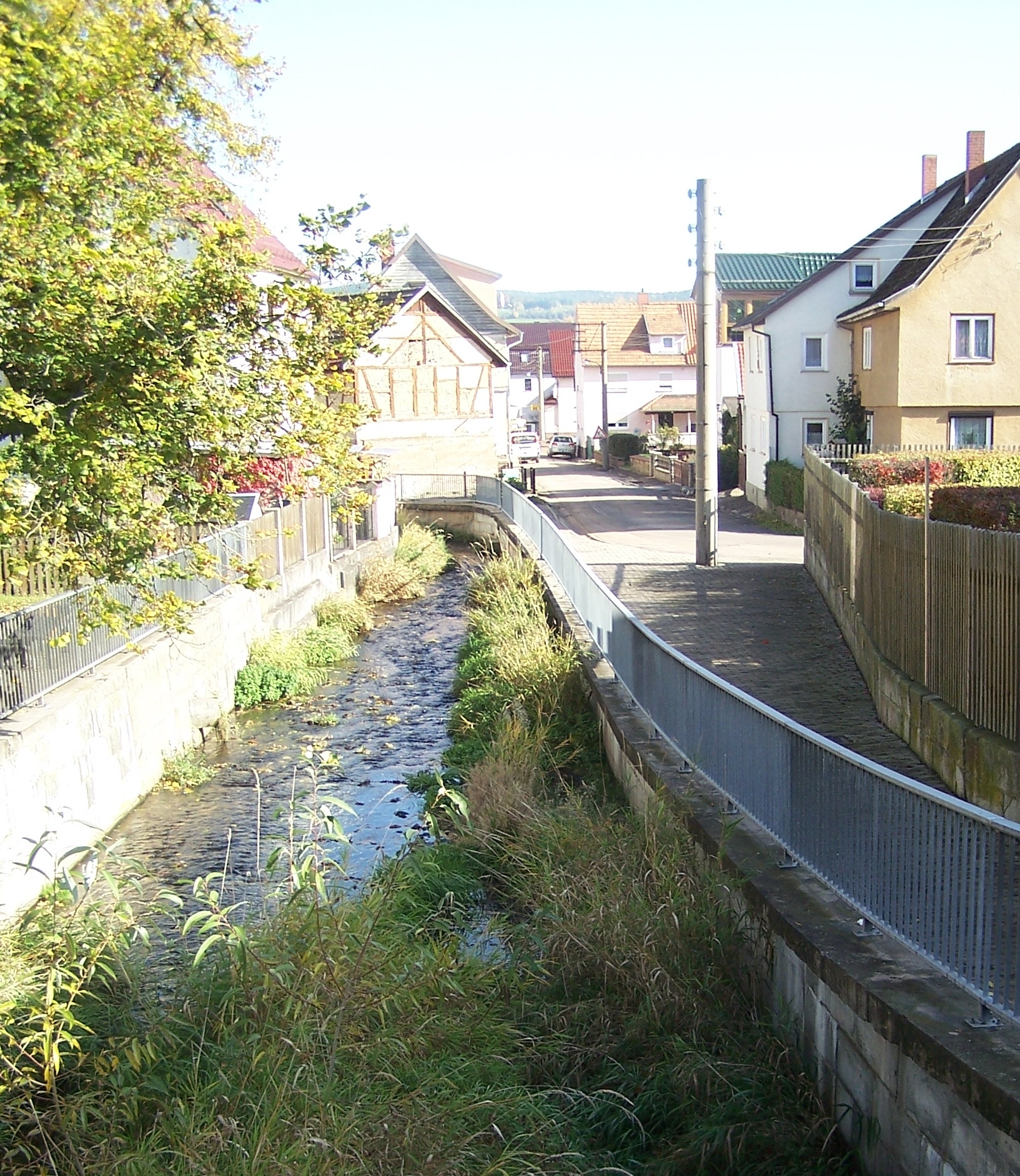

Location
- Country: Germany
- States: Thuringia

Physical characteristics
- Mouth
  - location: Werra
  - coordinates: 50.7258°N 10.3574°E

Basin features
- Progression: Werra→ Weser→ North Sea

Rosabach is a river of Thuringia, Germany. It flows into the Werra in Wernshausen.

== See also ==
- List of rivers of Thuringia
