= Grumbach (Werra) =

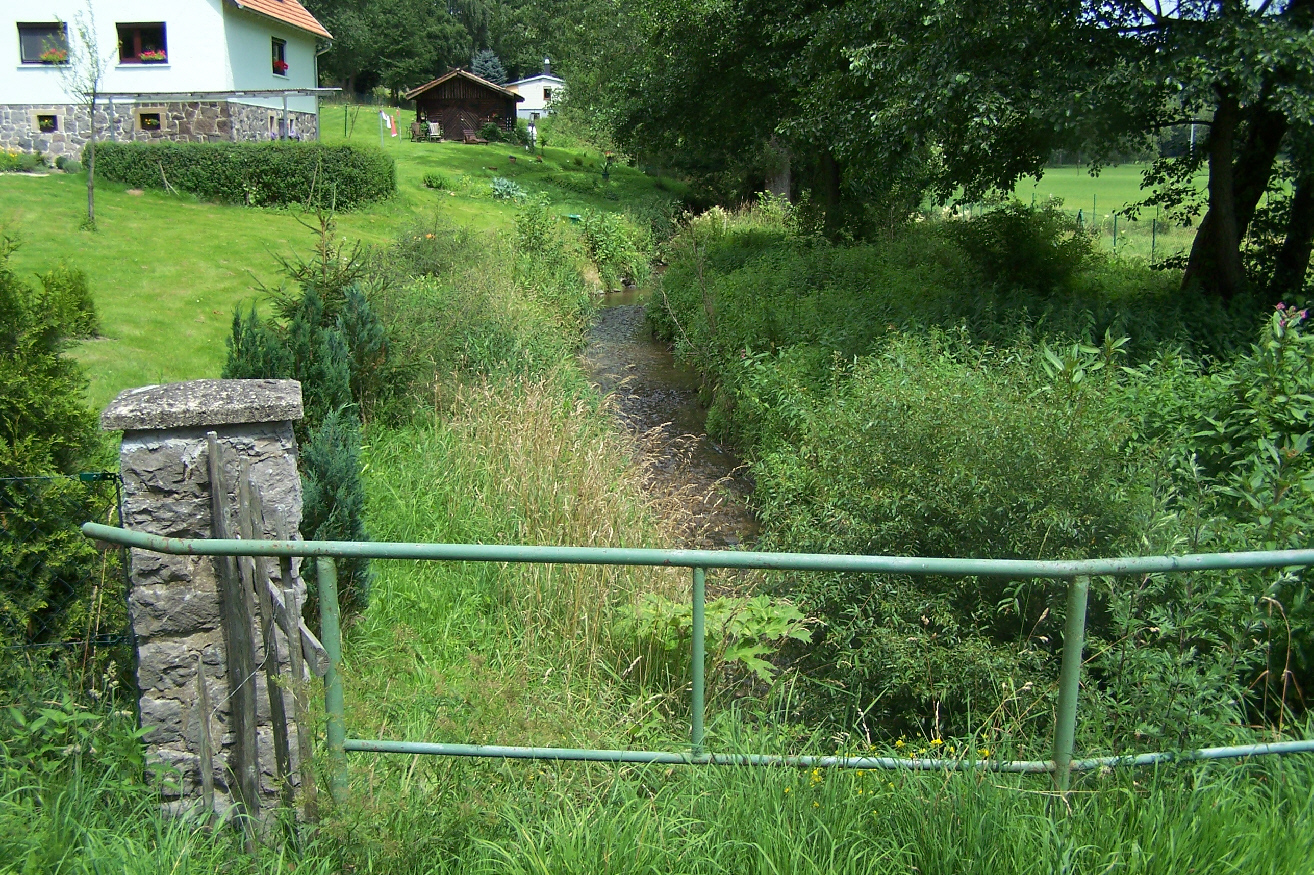

Location
- Country: Germany
- States: Thuringia

Physical characteristics
- Mouth
  - location: Werra
  - coordinates: 50°46′30″N 10°18′21″E

Basin features
- Progression: Werra→ Weser→ North Sea

Grumbach is a river of Thuringia, Germany. It flows into the Werra near Breitungen.

== See also ==
- List of rivers of Thuringia
