= Schorte =

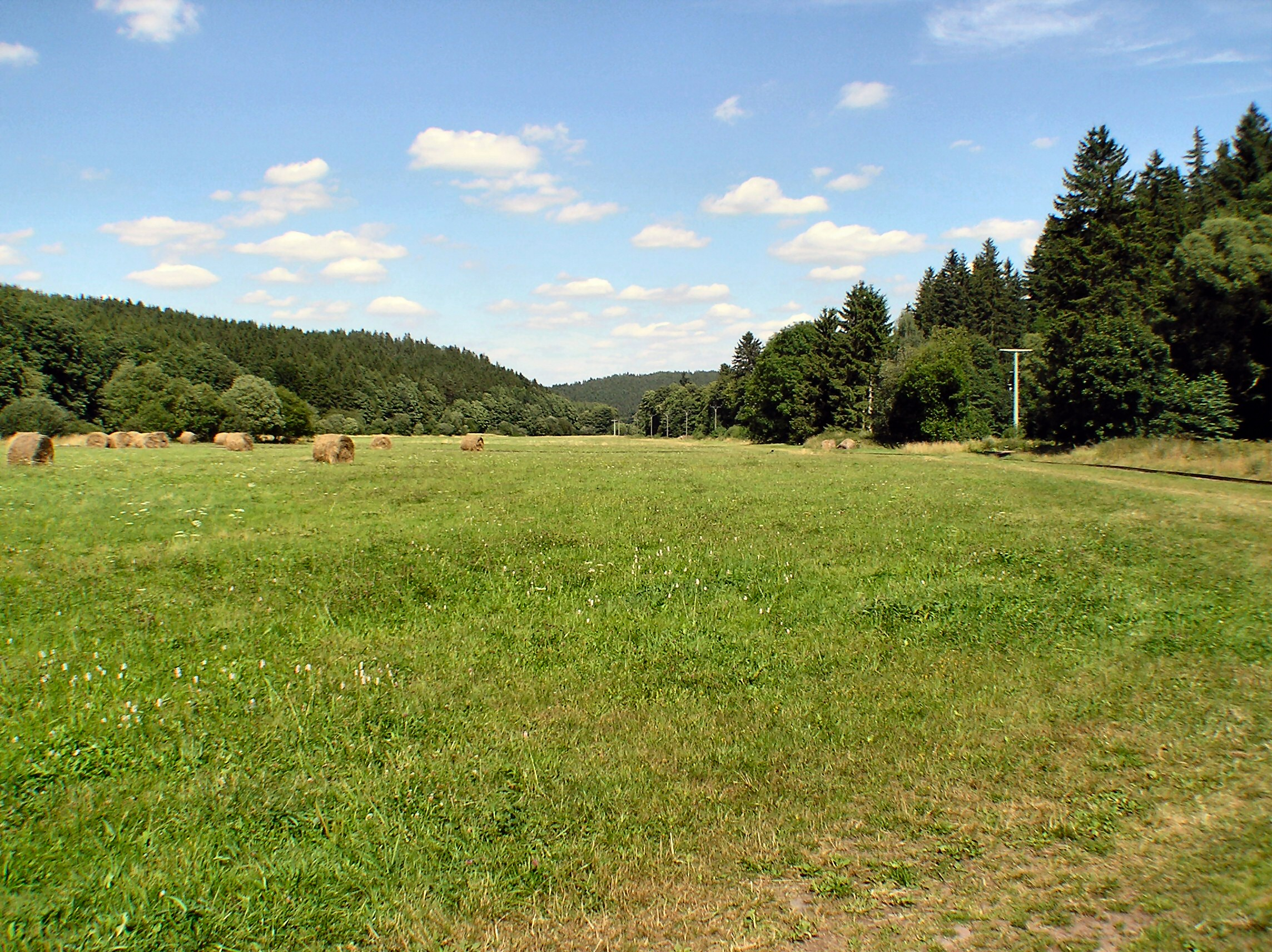

Location
- Country: Germany
- States: Thuringia

Physical characteristics
- Mouth
  - location: Ilm
  - coordinates: 50.6781°N 10.9418°E

Basin features
- Progression: Ilm→ Saale→ Elbe→ North Sea

Schorte is a river of Thuringia, Germany. It flows into the Ilm in Ilmenau.

== See also ==
- List of rivers of Thuringia
