= List of rivers of Thuringia =

A list of rivers of Thuringia, Germany:

== A ==
- Alster
- Apfelstädt
- Ascherbach
- Auma

== B ==
- Biber
- Bibra
- Blambach
- Bode
- Breitenbach
- Breitstrom

== D ==
- Dammbach
- Deube
- Dober
- Dürrbach

== E ==
- Effelder
- Eichbach
- Ellenbach
- Eller
- Elschnitztalbach
- Elte
- Emse
- Erbstrom
- Erle

== F ==
- Felda
- Freibach
- Frieda

== G ==
- Gabelbach
- Geislede
- Gera
- Geroder Eller
- Gessenbach
- Gleise
- Göltzsch
- Gönnerbach
- Göritz
- Gramme
- Grumbach
- Grümpen

== H ==
- Habergrund
- Hädderbach
- Hahle
- Hasel
- Helme
- Herpf
- Hörsel
- Humbach, tributary of the Ilm
- Humbach, tributary of the Schwarzbach

== I ==
- Ifta
- Ilm
- Itz

== J ==
- Jüchnitz
- Jüchse

== K ==
- Katza
- Kieselbach
- Klettenberger Mühlgraben
- Körnbach
- Kotschau
- Kupferbach

== L ==
- Laucha
- Lauter
- Lauterbach
- Leina
- Leine
- Lempertsbach
- Lengwitz
- Leutra, a tributary of the Saale in the centre of Jena
- Leutra, a tributary of the Saale in the district Maua of Jena
- Lichte
- Lichtenau
- Linderbach
- Lohme
- Loquitz
- Lossa
- Lütsche
- Lütsche-Flößgraben
- Lutter

== M ==
- Madel
- Magdel
- Milz
- Mühlwasser

== N ==
- Nahe
- Nesse
- Neubrunn
- Notter

== O ==
- Oechse
- Oelze
- Ohne
- Ohra
- Orla

== P ==
- Pfitzbach
- Piesau
- Pleiße

== R ==
- Reichenbach
- Retschenbach
- Rettbach
- Rinne
- Rinnebach
- Roda
- Rodach
- Rohrgraben
- Rosabach
- Rot, also called Roth
- Röthen
- Rottenbach, tributary of the Ilm
- Rottenbach, tributary of the Rinne

== S ==
- Saar
- Salza
- Scherkonde
- Schleuse
- Schmale Gera
- Schmalkalde
- Schnauder
- Schnellmannshäuser Bach
- Schobse
- Schorte
- Schwarza, tributary of the Hasel
- Schwarza, tributary of the Ilm
- Schwarza, tributary of the Saale
- Schwarzbach
- Schweina
- Seebach
- Sieglitz
- Sorbitz
- Sormitz
- Spitter
- Spring
- Sprotte
- Steinach
- Stille
- Streu
- Suhl, tributary of the Weihe
- Suhl, tributary of the Werra
- Sülze
- Saale

== T ==
- Taft
- Tannbach
- Taubach
- Thüringische Muschwitz
- Tonna
- Tonndorfbach
- Töpener Bach or Töpenbach – alternative name of the Kupferbach
- Truse

== U ==
- Uffe, former name of the Klettenberger Mühlgraben
- Uffe, tributary of the Wieda
- Ulster
- Unstrut

== V ==
- Vesser
- Vippach

== W ==
- Walkstrom
- Weid
- Weida
- Weihe
- Weilroder Eller
- White Elster
- Weißbach
- Werra
- Wethau
- Wieda
- Wilde Gera, a headstream of the Gera
- Wilde Gera, a small arm of the Gera in Erfurt
- Wilder Graben, tributary of the Nesse
- Wilder Graben, tributary of the Seebach
- Wipfra
- Wipper
- Wirrbach
- Wisenta
- Wohlrose
- Wümbach
- Wyhra

== Z ==
- Zahme Gera
- Zaufensgraben
- Zeilbach
- Zeitzbach
- Zimmerbach
- Zorge
