= Ellenbach =

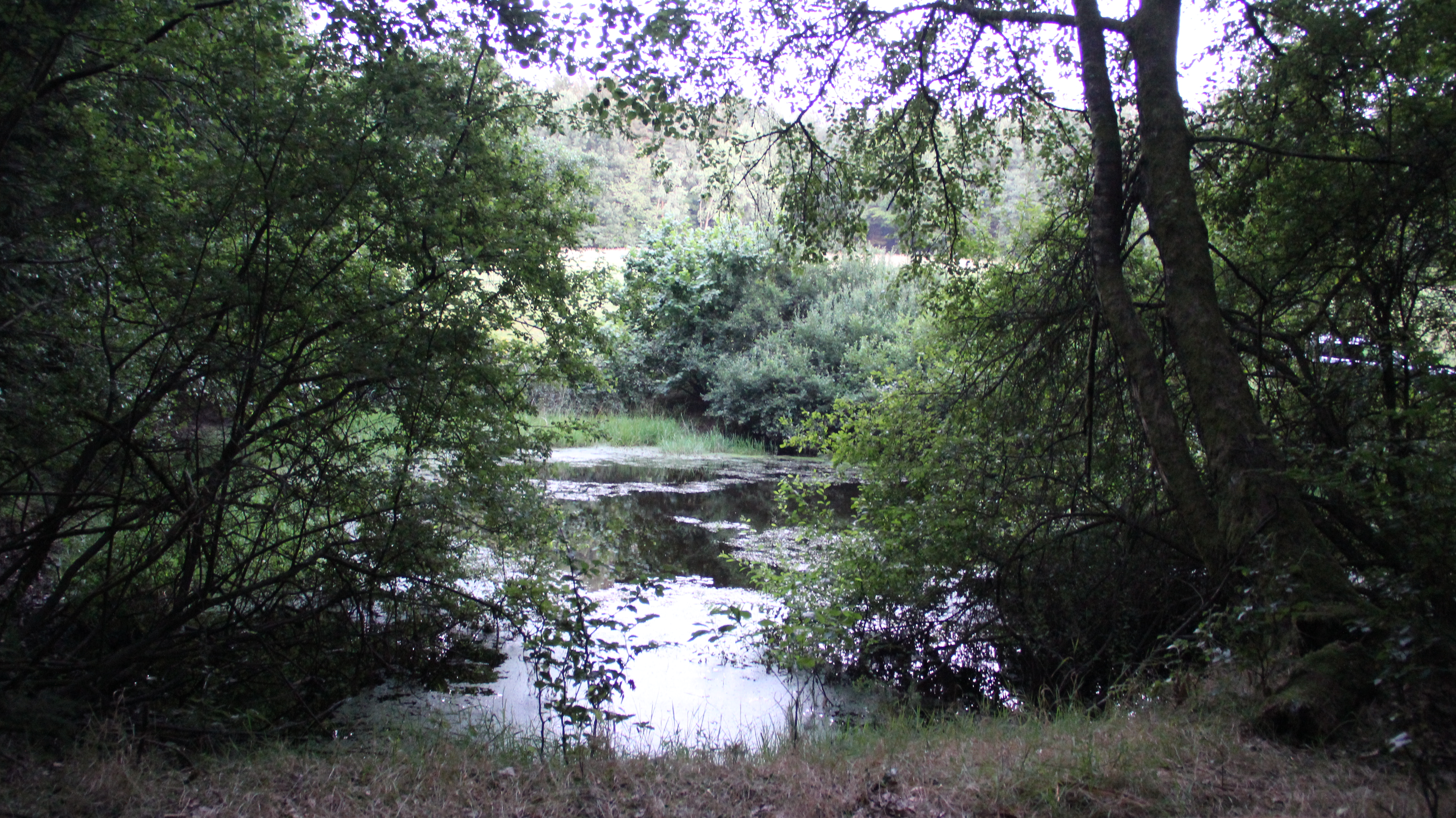
- Pond below the source

Location
- Country: Germany
- State: Thuringia

Physical characteristics
- Source
  - coordinates: 50.3614°N 11.0658°E
- Mouth
  - location: Effelder
  - coordinates: 50.3632°N 11.0391°E

Basin features
- Progression: Effelder→ Itz→ Main→ Rhine→ North Sea

Ellenbach is a river of Thuringia, Germany. It is a left tributary of the Effelder.

== See also ==
- List of rivers of Thuringia
