= Vippach =

Location
- Country: Germany
- State: Thuringia

Physical characteristics
- Mouth
  - location: Gramme
  - coordinates: 51.1161°N 11.0556°E

Basin features
- Progression: Gramme→ Unstrut→ Saale→ Elbe→ North Sea

Vippach (German pronunciation: [ˈfɪpax]) is a river in Thuringia, Germany. It flows into the Gramme near Kranichborn.

== History ==
The Vippach rises east of the city of Neumark in the district of Weimarer Land and flows in a westerly direction through Neumark and Vippachedelhausen.

== See also ==
- List of rivers of Thuringia
