= Dürrbach (Orla) =

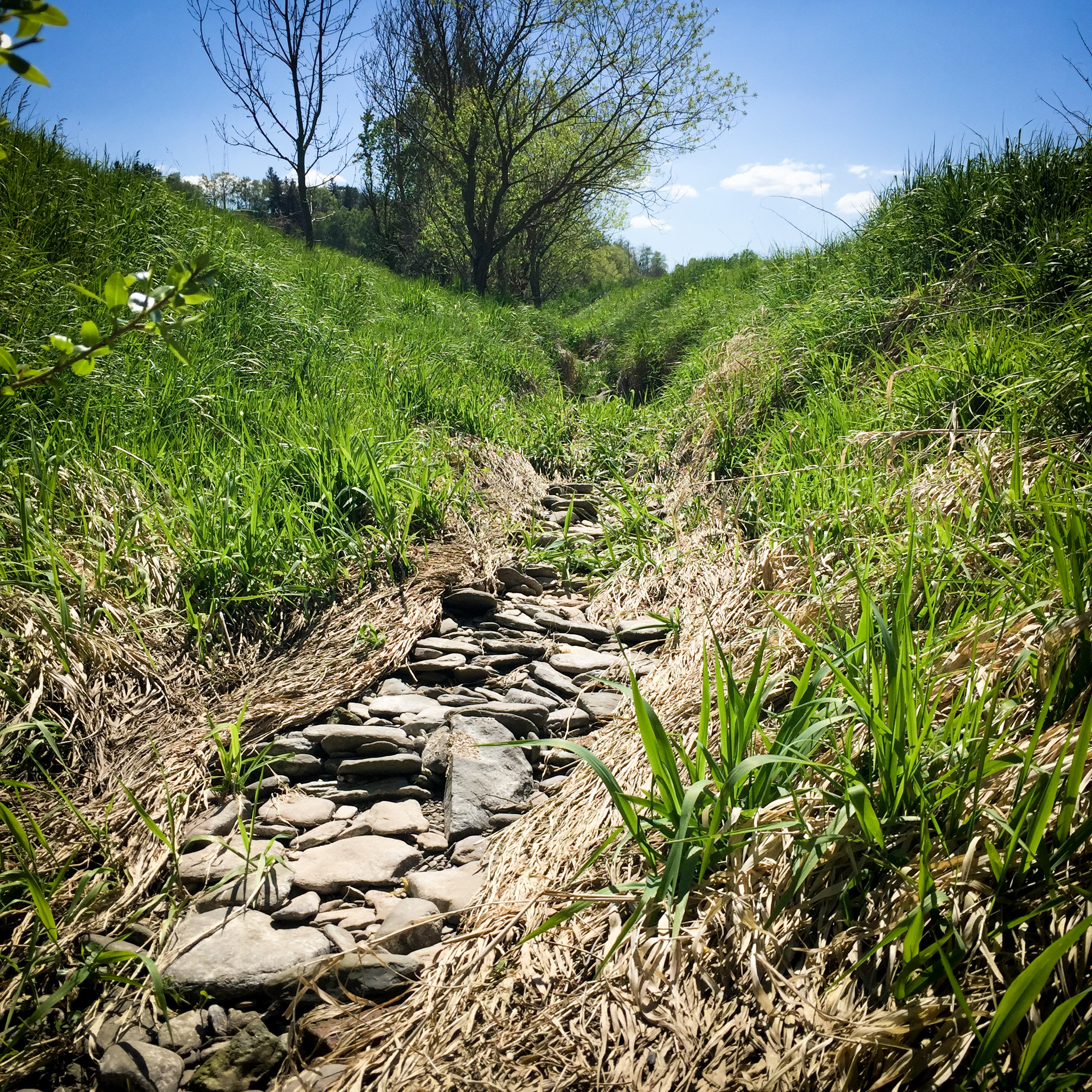
- South of the district Kolba of Oppurg: above ground the Dürrbach is dry, it flows subterranean

Location
- Country: Germany
- State: Thuringia

Physical characteristics
- Mouth
  - location: Orla
  - coordinates: 50.7205°N 11.6771°E

Basin features
- Progression: Orla→ Saale→ Elbe→ North Sea

Dürrbach is a river of Thuringia, Germany, a tributary of the Orla.

== See also ==
- List of rivers of Thuringia
