= Gönnerbach =

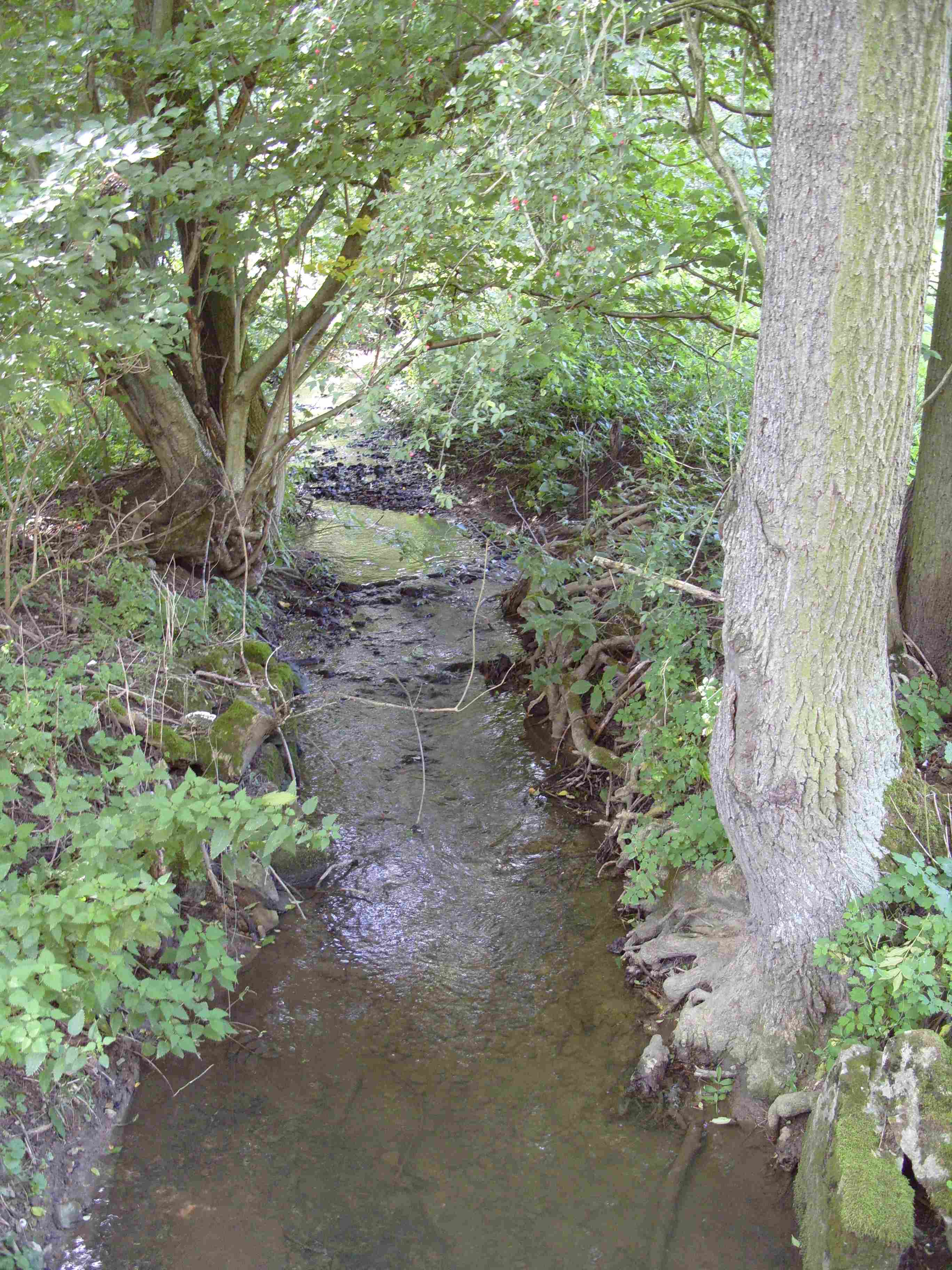

Location
- Country: Germany
- States: Thuringia

Physical characteristics
- Mouth
  - location: Saale
  - coordinates: 50°58′57″N 11°39′44″E

Basin features
- Progression: Saale→ Elbe→ North Sea

Gönnerbach is a river of Thuringia, Germany. It flows into the Saale near Golmsdorf.

== See also ==
- List of rivers of Thuringia
