= Rohrgraben (Werra) =

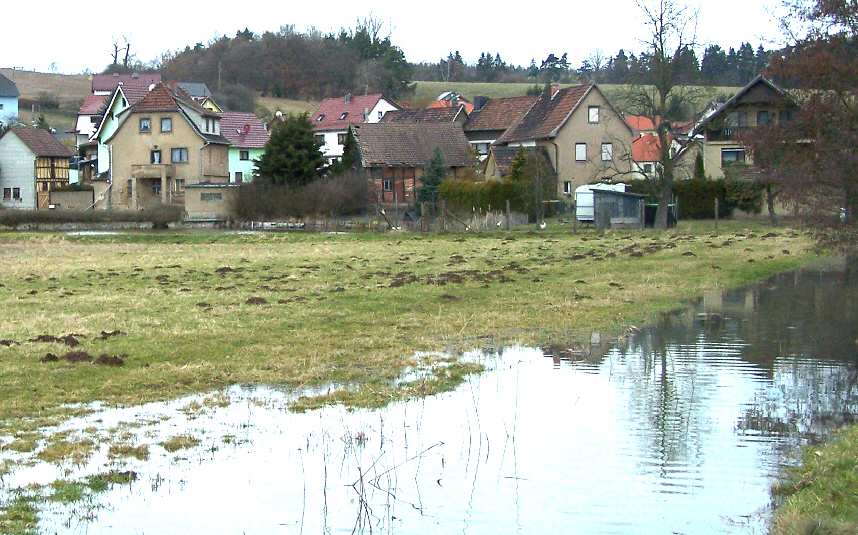
- Mouth of the Rohrgraben, grassland of the bank of the Werra, at high-water in spring

Location
- Country: Germany
- State: Thuringia

Physical characteristics
- Source
  - location: South of Möhra, a district of Bad Salzungen
  - coordinates: 50.8565°N 10.2462°E
- Mouth
  - location: near Unterrohn, a district of Bad Salzungen, into the Werra
  - coordinates: 50.8276°N 10.1882°E

Basin features
- Progression: Werra→ Weser→ North Sea

Rohrgraben is a river of Thuringia, Germany.

The Rohrgraben springs south of Möhra, a district of the municipality Moorgrund. It is a right tributary of the Werra near Unterrohn, a district of Bad Salzungen.

== See also ==
- List of rivers of Thuringia
