= Walkstrom =

Coordinates: 50.9676°N 11.0210°E

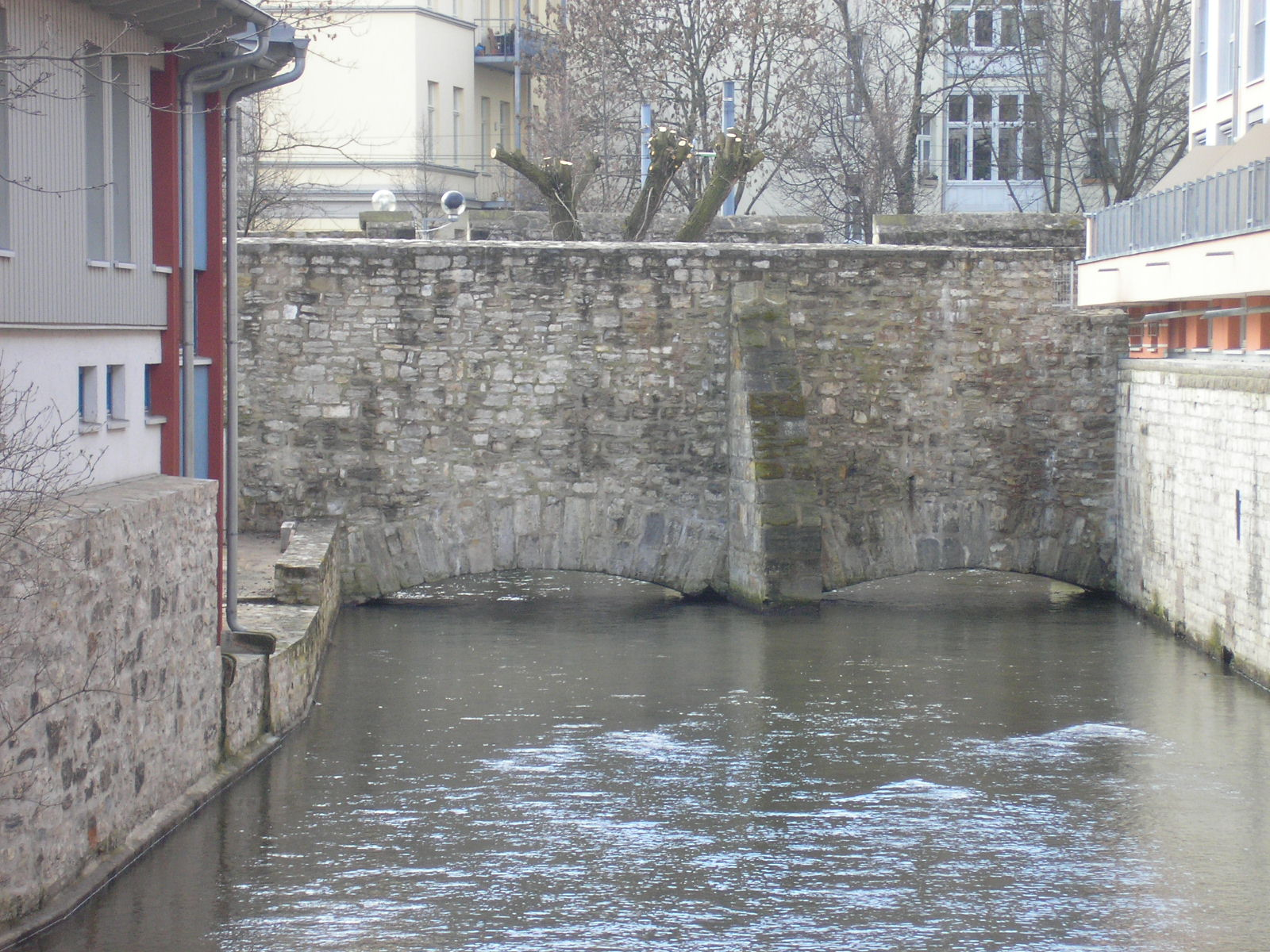

Location
- Country: Germany
- State: Thuringia

Walkstrom is a branch of the river Gera in Erfurt, Thuringia, Germany.

== See also ==
- List of rivers of Thuringia
