= Zeitzbach =

Coordinates: 50.8659°N 11.7242°E

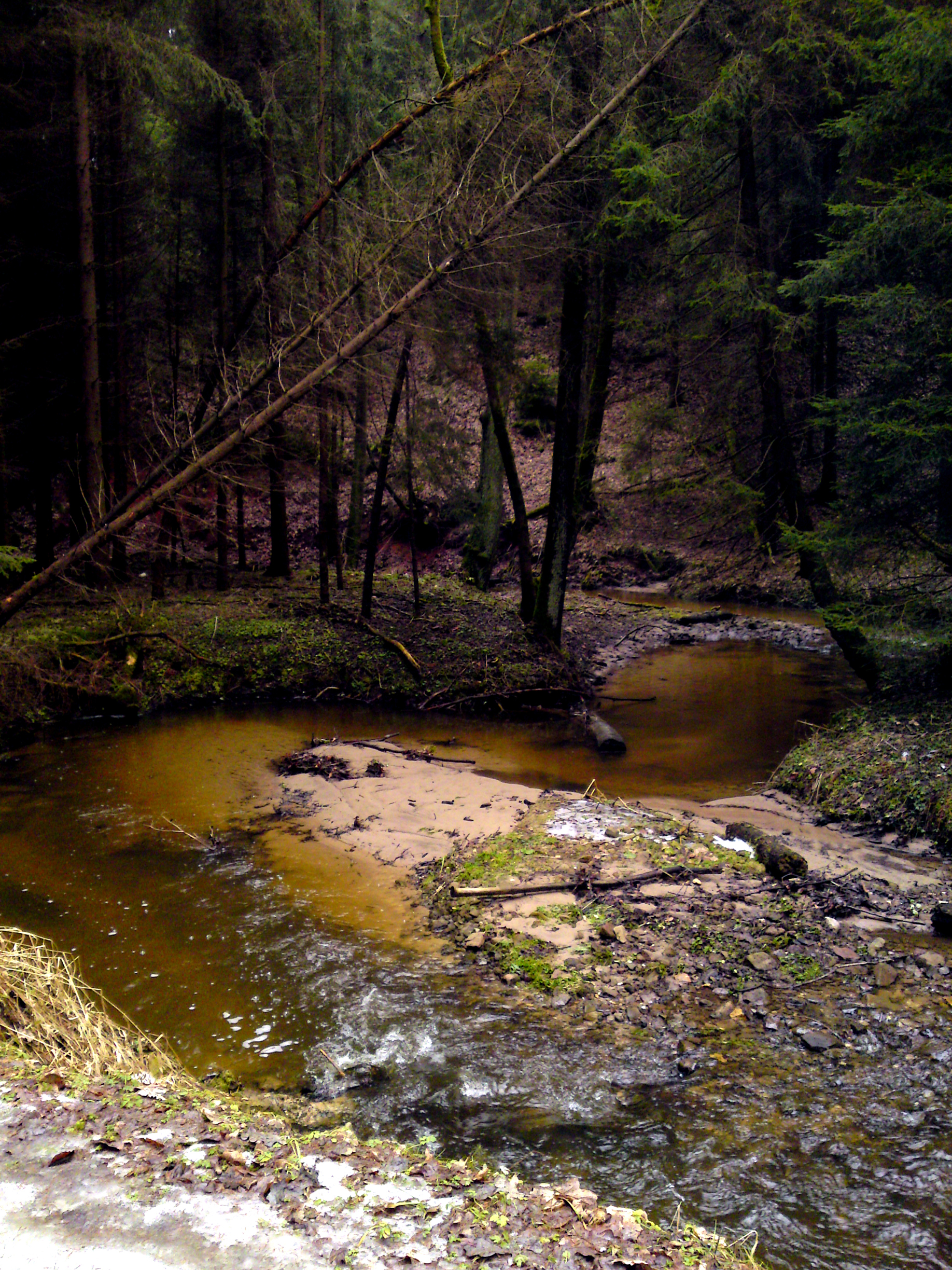

Location
- Country: Germany
- State: Thuringia

Physical characteristics
- Mouth
  - location: Roda

Basin features
- Progression: Roda→ Saale→ Elbe→ North Sea

Zeitzbach is a river of Thuringia, Germany. It flows into the Roda in Stadtroda.

== See also ==
- List of rivers of Thuringia
