= Humbach (Ilm) =

Coordinates: 50.7383°N 11.0317°E

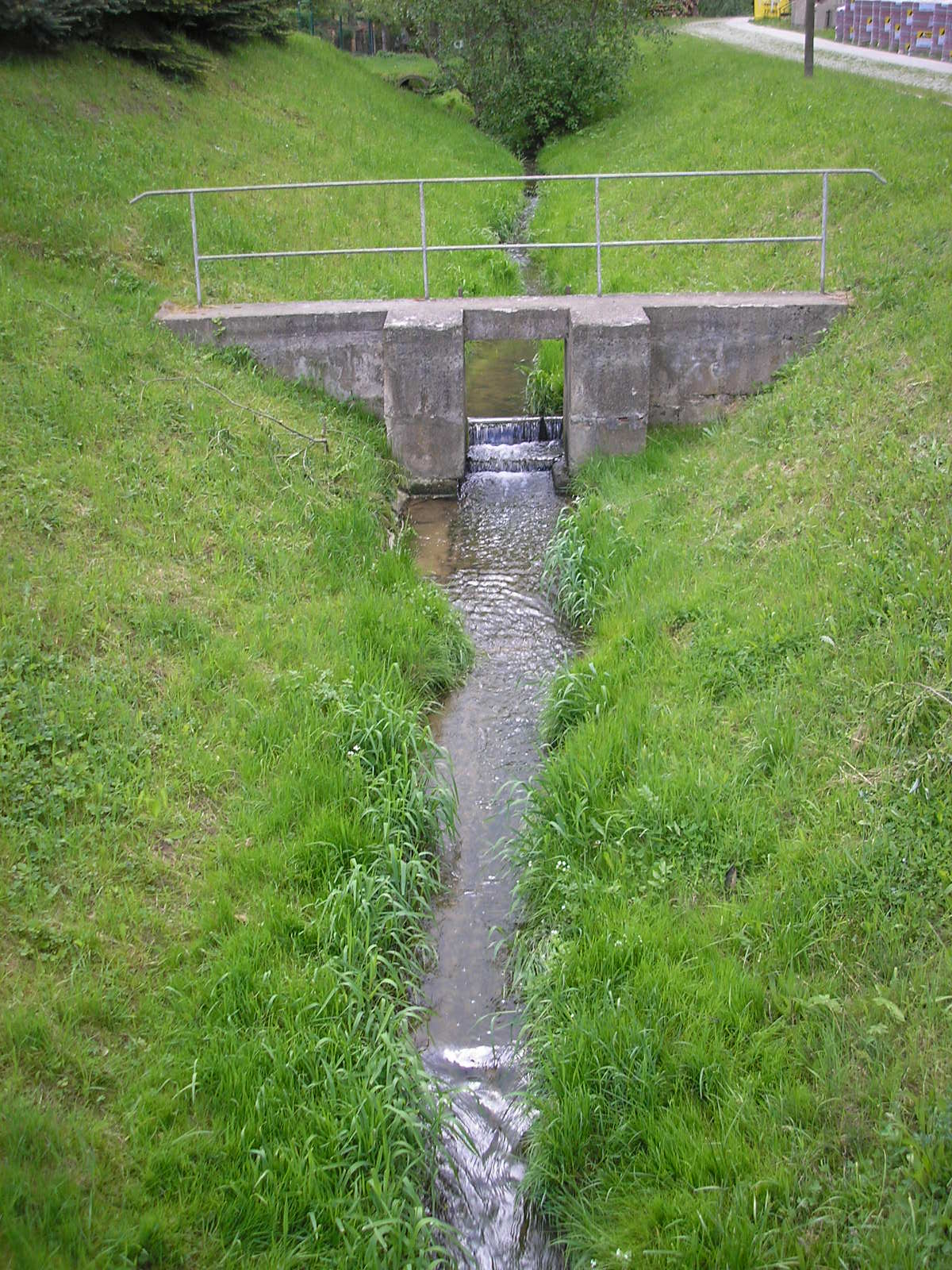

Location
- Country: Germany
- States: Thuringia

Physical characteristics
- Mouth
  - location: Ilm

Basin features
- Progression: Ilm→ Saale→ Elbe→ North Sea

Humbach is a small river of Thuringia, Germany. It joins the Ilm near Cottendorf.

== See also ==
- List of rivers of Thuringia
