= Lauterbach (Werra) =

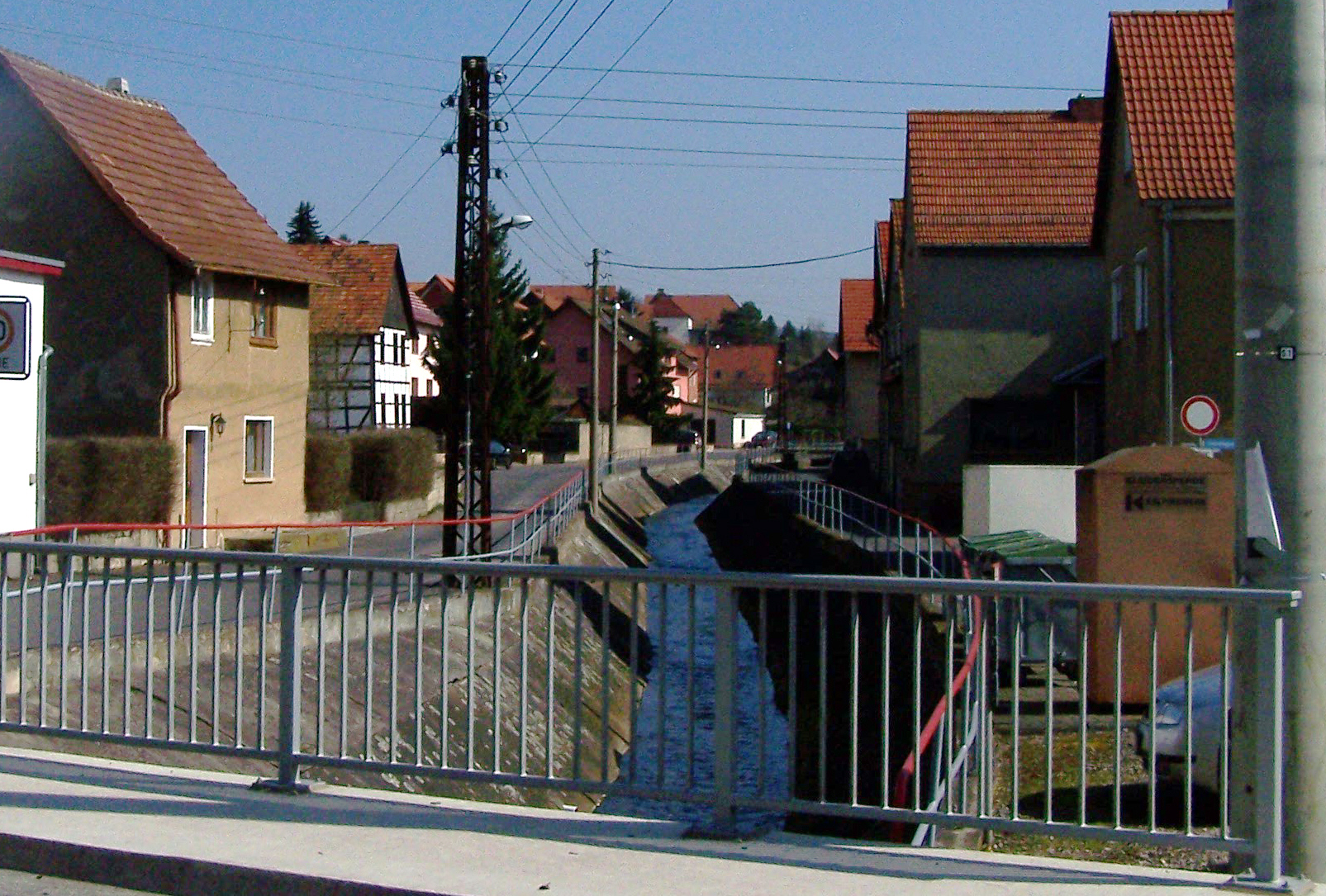

Location
- Country: Germany
- States: Thuringia

Physical characteristics
- Mouth
  - location: Werra
  - coordinates: 51.0797°N 10.3324°E

Basin features
- Progression: Werra→ Weser→ North Sea

Lauterbach (German pronunciation: [ˈlaʊtɐbax]) is a river of Thuringia, Germany. It flows into the Werra in Mihla.

== See also ==
- List of rivers of Thuringia
