= Taft (Ulster) =

River in Germany

Location
- Country: Germany
- States: Hesse and Thuringia

Physical characteristics
- Mouth
  - location: Ulster
  - coordinates: 50.7690°N 9.9457°E
- Length: 11.8 km (7.3 mi)

Basin features
- Progression: Ulster→ Werra→ Weser→ North Sea

Taft is a river of Hesse and Thuringia, Germany. It flows into the Ulster near Buttlar.

== See also ==
- List of rivers of Hesse
- List of rivers of Thuringia
