= Retschenbach =

Location
- Country: Germany
- States: Thuringia

Physical characteristics
- Mouth
  - location: Effelder
  - coordinates: 50°22′48″N 11°03′39″E

Basin features
- Progression: Effelder→ Itz→ Main→ Rhine→ North Sea

Retschenbach is a river of Thuringia, Germany. It flows into the Effelder near Seltendorf.

== See also ==
- List of rivers of Thuringia
