= Schweina (river) =

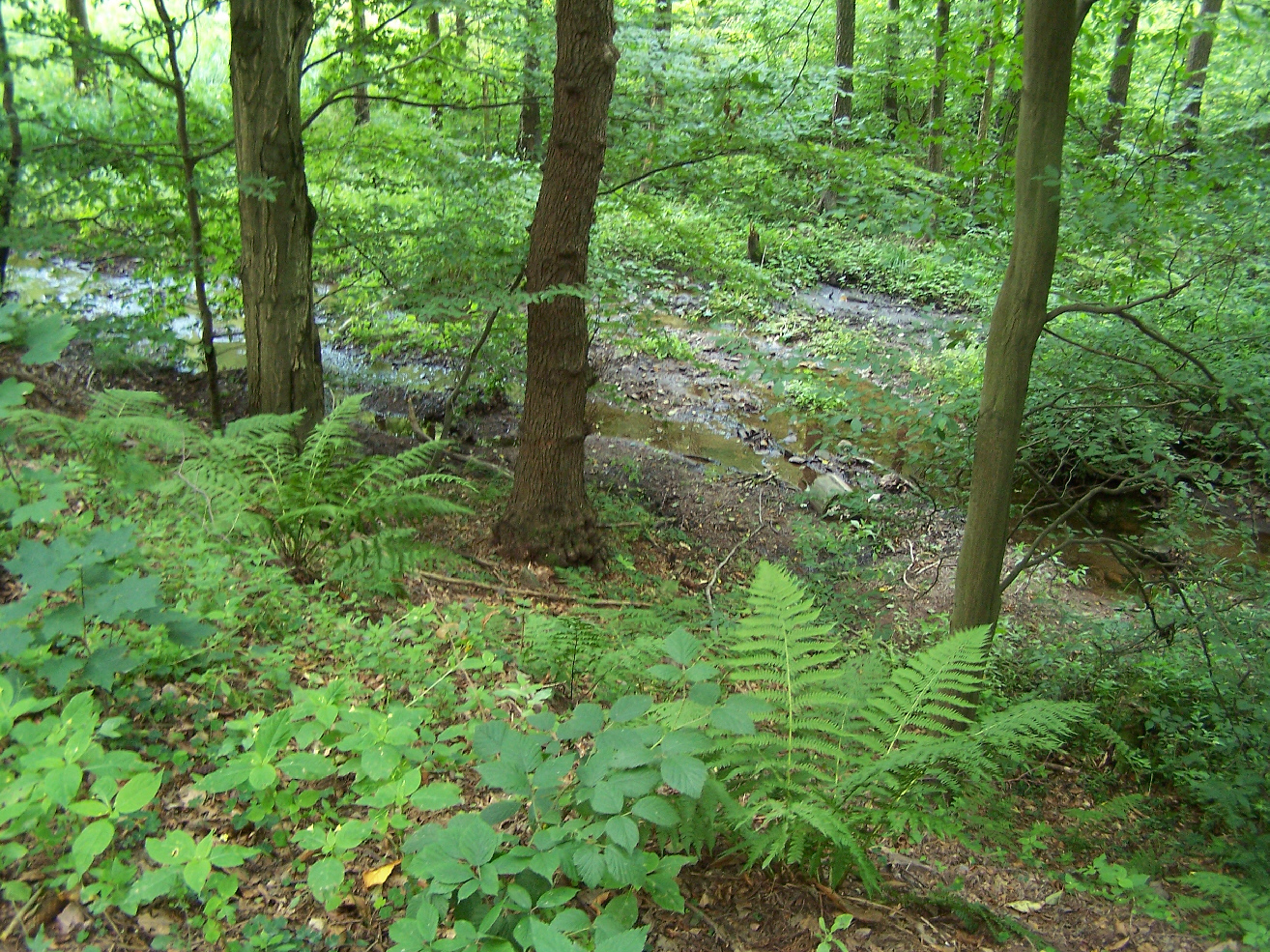

Location
- Country: Germany
- State: Thuringia

Physical characteristics
- Mouth
  - location: Werra
  - coordinates: 50.8009°N 10.2930°E

Basin features
- Progression: Werra→ Weser→ North Sea

Schweina (German pronunciation: [ˈʃvaɪna]) is a river of Thuringia, Germany. It flows into the Werra in Barchfeld.

== See also ==
- List of rivers of Thuringia
