= Hädderbach =

Location
- Country: Germany
- States: Thuringia

Physical characteristics
- Mouth
  - location: Schwarza
  - coordinates: 50.6288°N 11.1560°E

Basin features
- Progression: Schwarza→ Saale→ Elbe→ North Sea

Hädderbach is a river of Thuringia, Germany. It flows into the Schwarza in Sitzendorf.

== See also ==
- List of rivers of Thuringia
