= Pfitzbach =

Location
- Country: Germany
- State: Thuringia

Physical characteristics
- Mouth
  - location: Werra
  - coordinates: 50.8144°N 10.2541°E

Basin features
- Progression: Werra→ Weser→ North Sea

Pfitzbach, also called Pfützbach, is a river of Thuringia, Germany. It flows into the Werra in Bad Salzungen.

== See also ==
- List of rivers of Thuringia
