= Gabelbach (Ilm) =

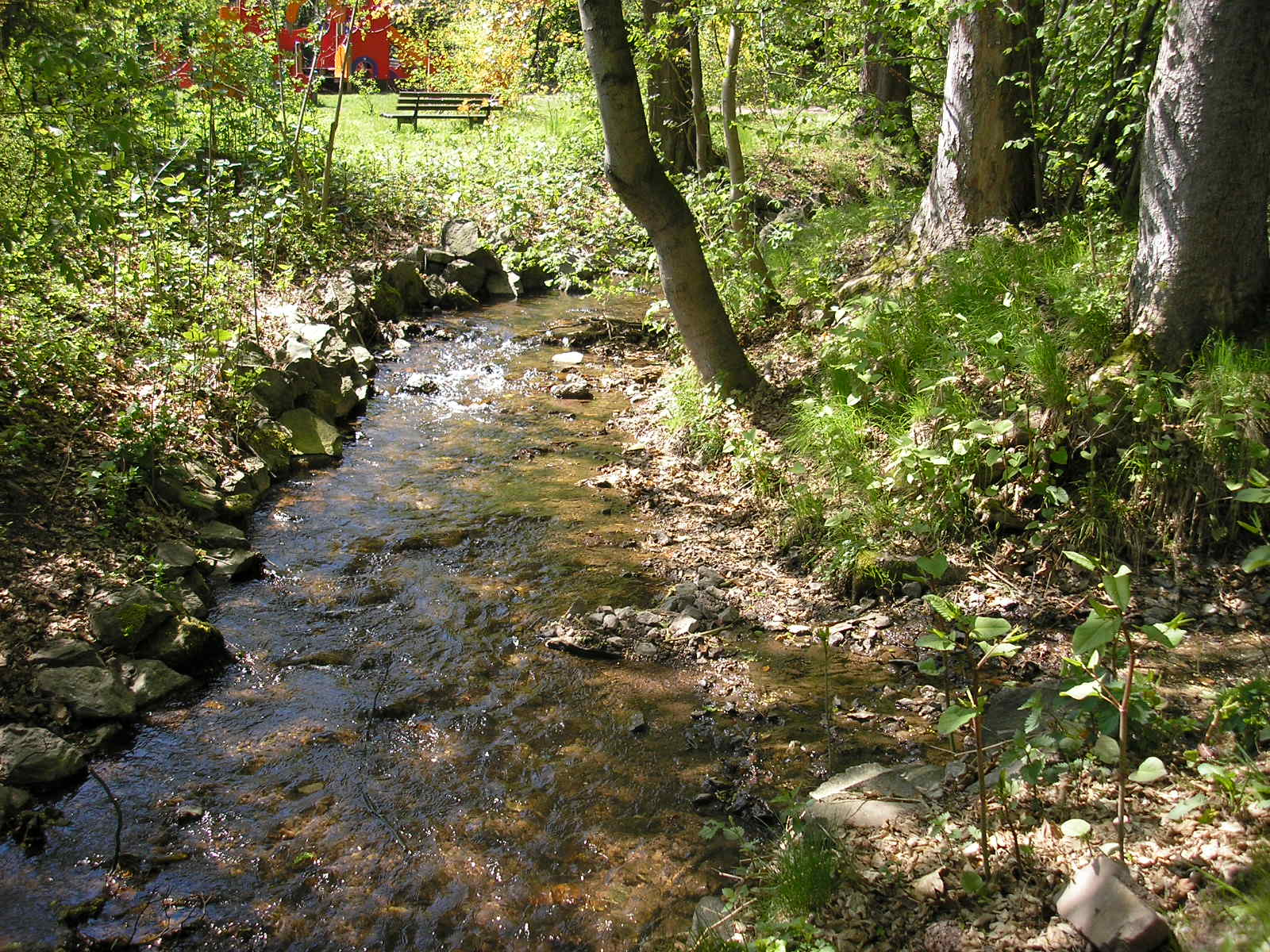

Location
- Country: Germany
- States: Thuringia

Physical characteristics
- Mouth
  - location: Ilm
  - coordinates: 50°40′54″N 10°54′36″E

Basin features
- Progression: Ilm→ Saale→ Elbe→ North Sea

Gabelbach (German pronunciation: [ˈɡaːbl̩bax]) is a small river of Thuringia, Germany. It joins the Ilm in Ilmenau.

== See also ==
- List of rivers of Thuringia
