= Deube =

Location
- Country: Germany
- State: Thuringia

Physical characteristics
- Mouth
  - location: Ilm
  - coordinates: 50.7696°N 11.0652°E

Basin features
- Progression: Ilm→ Saale→ Elbe→ North Sea

Deube is a river of Thuringia, Germany. It joins the Ilm near Stadtilm.

== See also ==
- List of rivers of Thuringia
