= Wilde Gera (Erfurt) =

Location
- Country: Germany
- State: Thuringia

Wilde Gera is a branch of the river Gera in Erfurt, Thuringia, Germany.

== See also ==
- List of rivers of Thuringia
