= Wisenta =

River in Germany

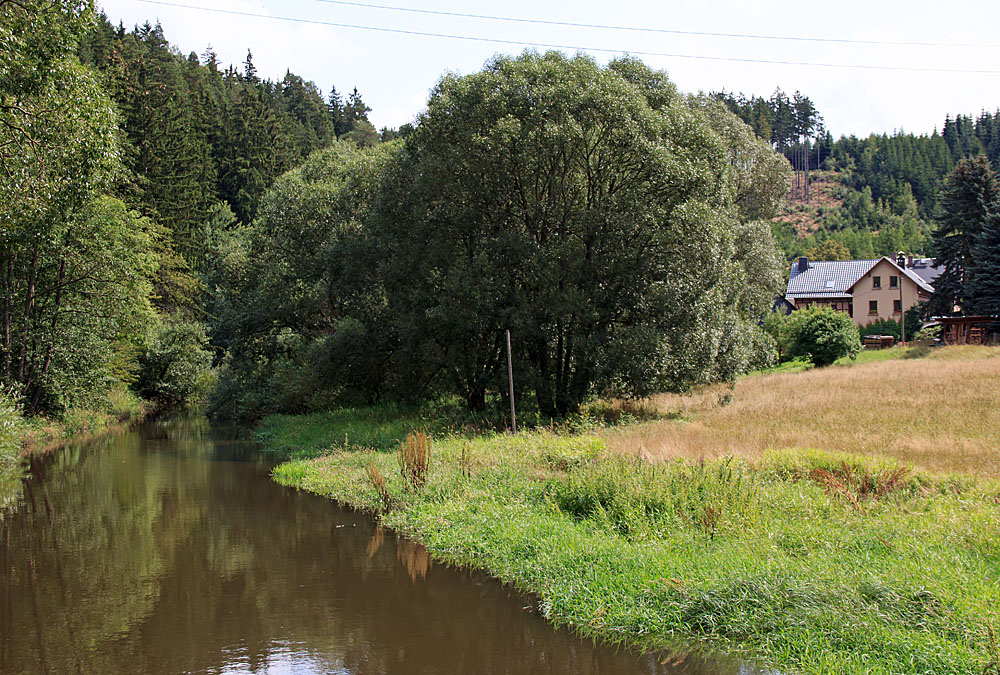

Location
- Country: Germany
- States: Thuringia and Saxony

Physical characteristics
- Mouth
  - location: Saale
  - coordinates: 50.5788°N 11.6774°E

Basin features
- Progression: Saale→ Elbe→ North Sea

Wisenta is a river of Thuringia and Saxony, Germany. It flows into the Saale near Eßbach.

The Wisenta rises in eastern Thuringia, approximately 2 km west of the village of Rothenacker, which is part of the town of Tanna. Rather than a single spring, the river originates from a small spring area located on the eastern slope of the forested Rosenbühl hill (653 m above sea level). The source area lies at an elevation of about 605 m above sea level.

== See also ==
- List of rivers of Thuringia
- List of rivers of Saxony
