= Rottenbach (Ilm) =

Location
- Country: Germany
- States: Thuringia

Physical characteristics
- Mouth
  - location: Ilm
  - coordinates: 50.6815°N 10.9273°E

Basin features
- Progression: Ilm→ Saale→ Elbe→ North Sea

Rottenbach (German pronunciation: [ˈʁɔtn̩ˌbax]) is a small river of Thuringia, Germany. It joins the Ilm in Ilmenau.

== See also ==
- List of rivers of Thuringia
