= Lempertsbach =

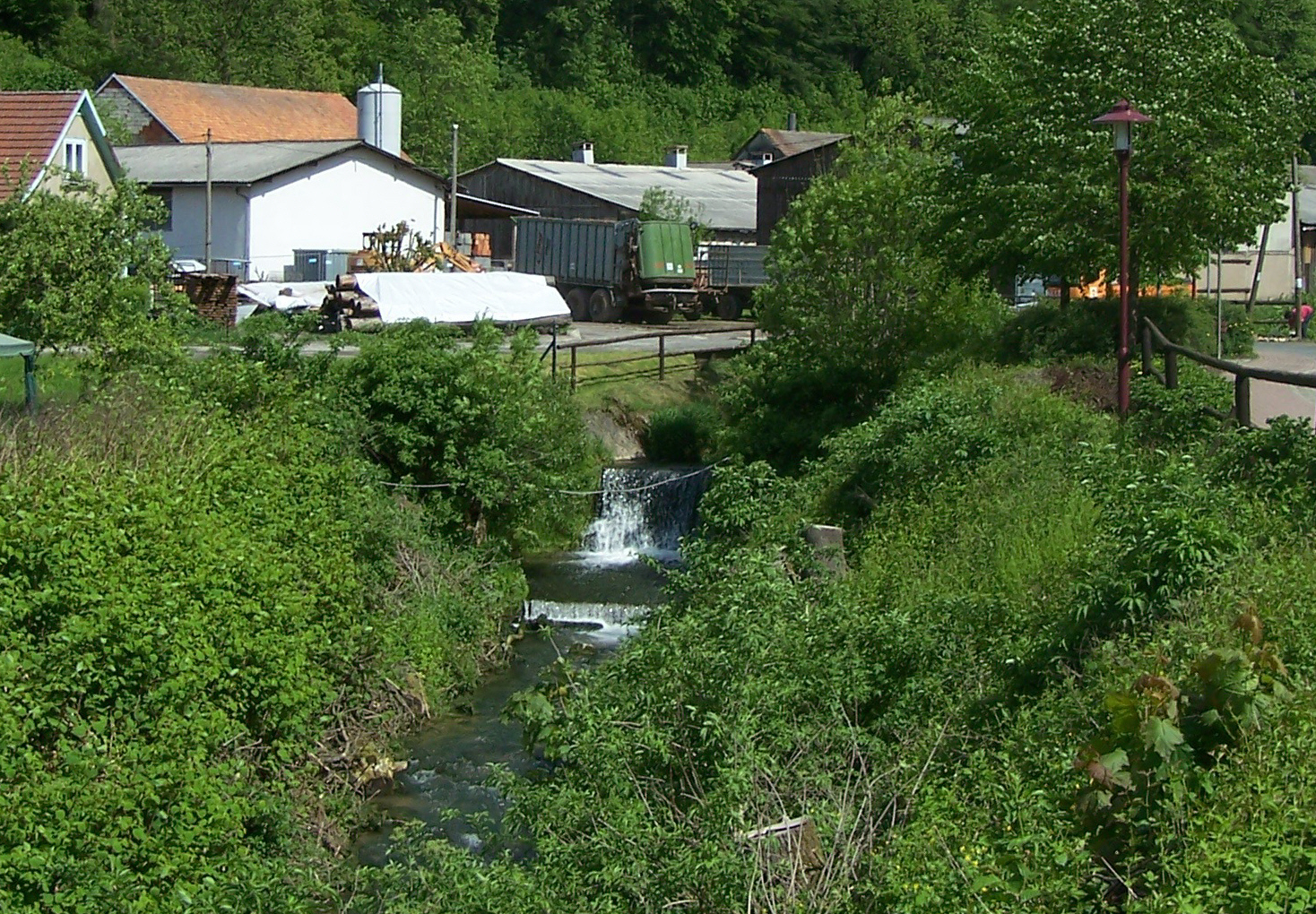

Location
- Country: Germany
- States: Thuringia

Physical characteristics
- Mouth
  - location: Werra
  - coordinates: 51.0872°N 10.3269°E

Basin features
- Progression: Werra→ Weser→ North Sea

Lempertsbach is a river in Thuringia, Germany. It flows into the Werra near Mihla.

== See also ==
- List of rivers of Thuringia
