= Lohme (Ilm) =

Location
- Country: Germany
- States: Thuringia

Physical characteristics
- Mouth
  - location: Ilm
  - coordinates: 50°40′16″N 10°59′41″E

Basin features
- Progression: Ilm→ Saale→ Elbe→ North Sea

Lohme is a river of Thuringia, Germany. It joins the Ilm near Langewiesen.

== See also ==
- List of rivers of Thuringia
