= Alster (Itz) =

River in Germany

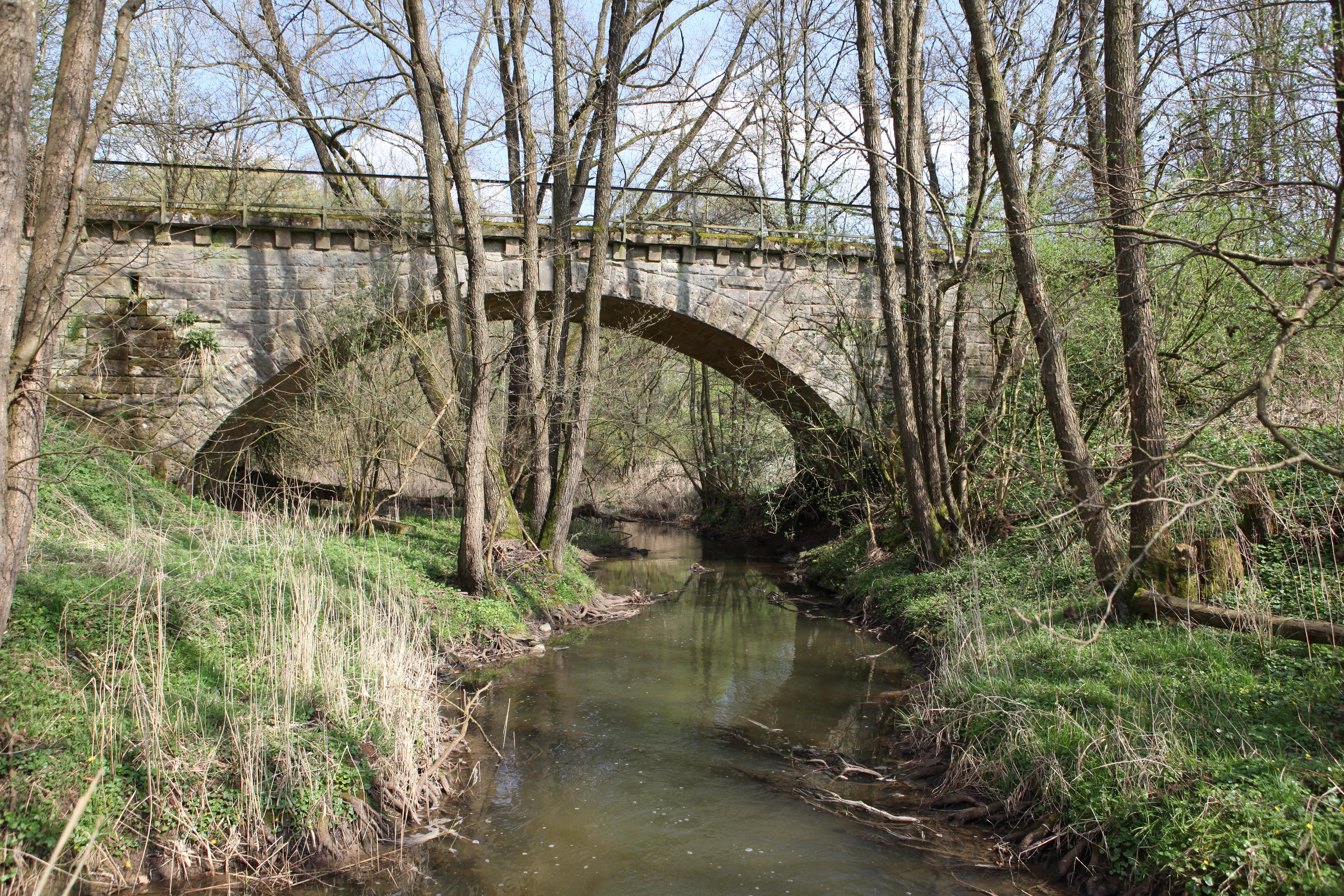
- The former railway bridge over the Alster at Heilgersdorf (Seßlach)

- Location of mouth in Bavaria

Location
- Country: Germany
- States: Bavaria and Thuringia

Physical characteristics
- Mouth
  - location: Itz
  - coordinates: 50°07′46″N 10°52′16″E
- Length: 20.7 km (12.9 mi)

Basin features
- Progression: Itz→ Main→ Rhine→ North Sea

The Alster is a river of Bavaria and of Thuringia, Germany. It is a right-bank tributary of the Itz, which it joins near Kaltenbrunn (a part of Itzgrund).

The name is derived from the Germanic *al-stra- 'growing, swelling'.

== See also ==
- List of rivers of Bavaria
- List of rivers of Thuringia
