= Elte (river) =

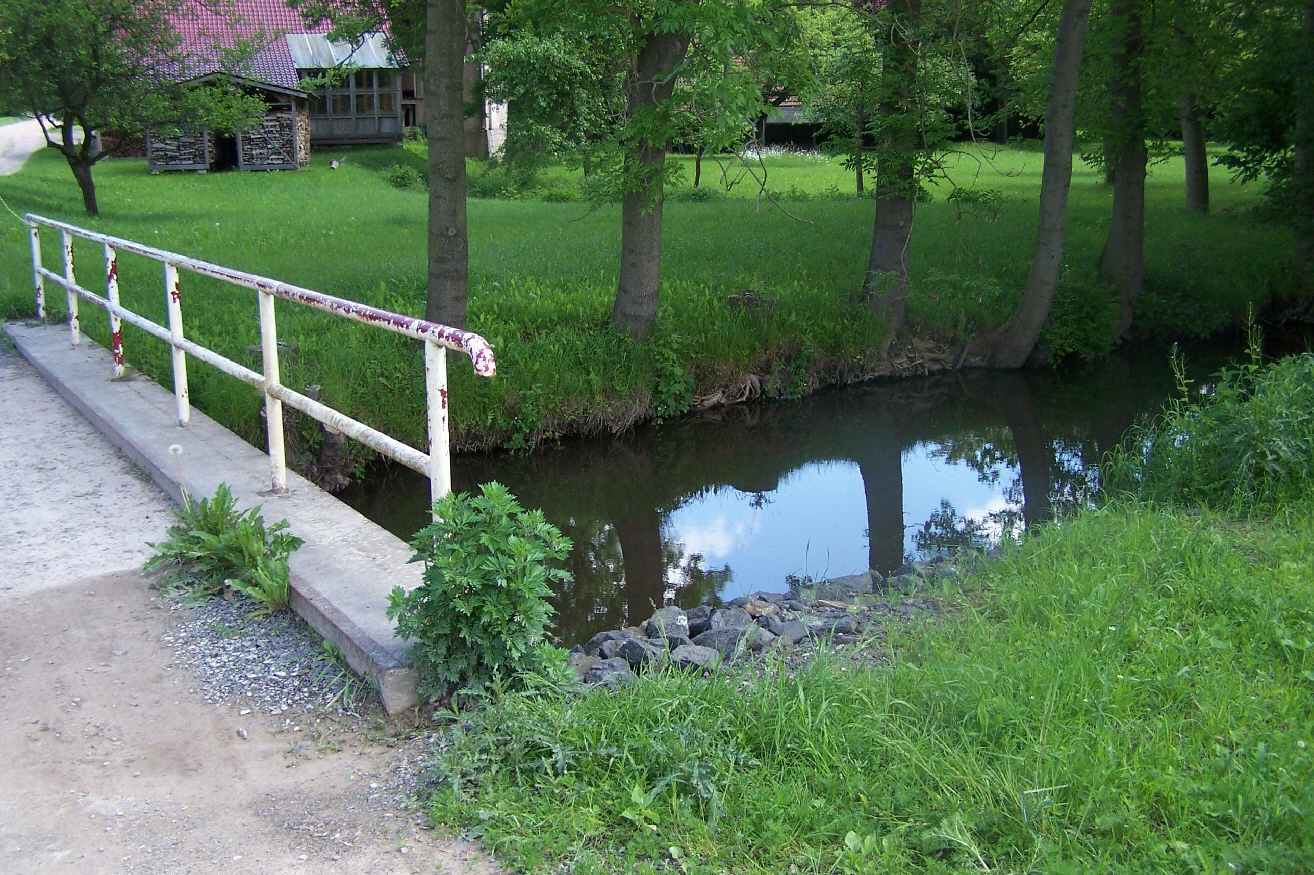

Location
- Country: Germany
- State: Thuringia

Physical characteristics
- Mouth
  - location: Werra
  - coordinates: 50.9959°N 10.1571°E

Basin features
- Progression: Werra→ Weser→ North Sea

Elte is a river in Thuringia, Germany. It flows into the Werra in Lauchröden.

== See also ==
- List of rivers of Thuringia
