= Klettenberger Mühlgraben =

Location
- Country: Germany
- State: Thuringia

Physical characteristics
- Mouth
  - location: Ichte
  - coordinates: 51.5317°N 10.6119°E

Basin features
- Progression: Ichte→ Helme→ Unstrut→ Saale→ Elbe→ North Sea

Klettenberger Mühlgraben, or simply Mühlgraben, historically also called Uffe, is a river of Thuringia, Germany.

The Klettenberger Mühlgraben is a left tributary of the Ichte near Holbach. It was built in the Middle Ages as a branch from the Uffe joining into the Ichte for driving water mills and supporting the area with service water.

The naming of these waters is somewhat complicate: At the point of the branch of the Klettenberger Mühlgraben, the Uffe is already called Sachsengraben; and the Klettenberger Mühlgraben itself was called Uffe in ancient times.

== See also ==
- List of rivers of Thuringia
