= Tonndorfbach =

Location
- Country: Germany
- State: Thuringia

Physical characteristics
- Mouth
  - location: Ilm
  - coordinates: 50.8715°N 11.2578°E

Basin features
- Progression: Ilm→ Saale→ Elbe→ North Sea

Tonndorfbach is a river of Thuringia, Germany. It flows into the Ilm near Bad Berka. The Tonndorfbach flows through the forested sandstone‑hill region known as Tannrodaer Waldland, a 69 km² natural landscape between Bad Berka, Hohenfelden, Kranichfeld, and Blankenhain.Tannrodaer Waldland belongs to the broader natural‑landscape unit “Ilm‑Saale‑ and Ohrdrufer Plate”.

The village Tonndorf lies in the valley of the Tonndorfbach at about 326 m above sea level. Tonndorfbach thereby drains part of the Tannrodaer Waldland before merging into the Ilm between Bad Berka and Weimar, within the greater landscape region characterized by mixed forests, sandstone hills, and riparian biotopes along the Ilm‑valley.

== See also ==
- List of rivers of Thuringia
