= Magdel =

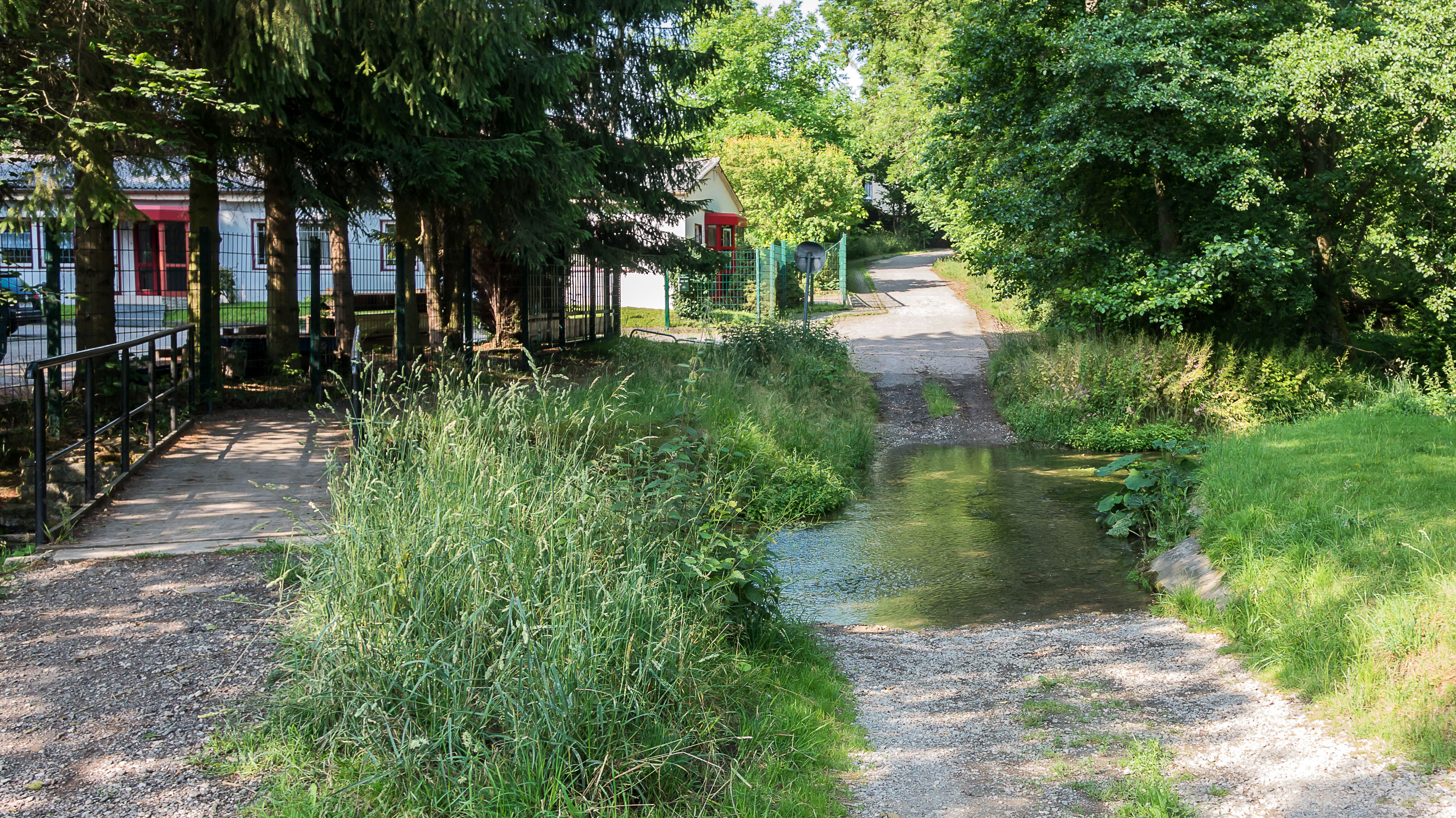

Location
- Country: Germany
- States: Thuringia

Physical characteristics
- Mouth
  - location: Ilm
  - coordinates: 50.9316°N 11.4016°E

Basin features
- Progression: Ilm→ Saale→ Elbe→ North Sea

Magdel is a river of Thuringia, Germany. It flows through the town Magdala, and it joins the Ilm near Mellingen.

== See also ==
- List of rivers of Thuringia
