= Truse =

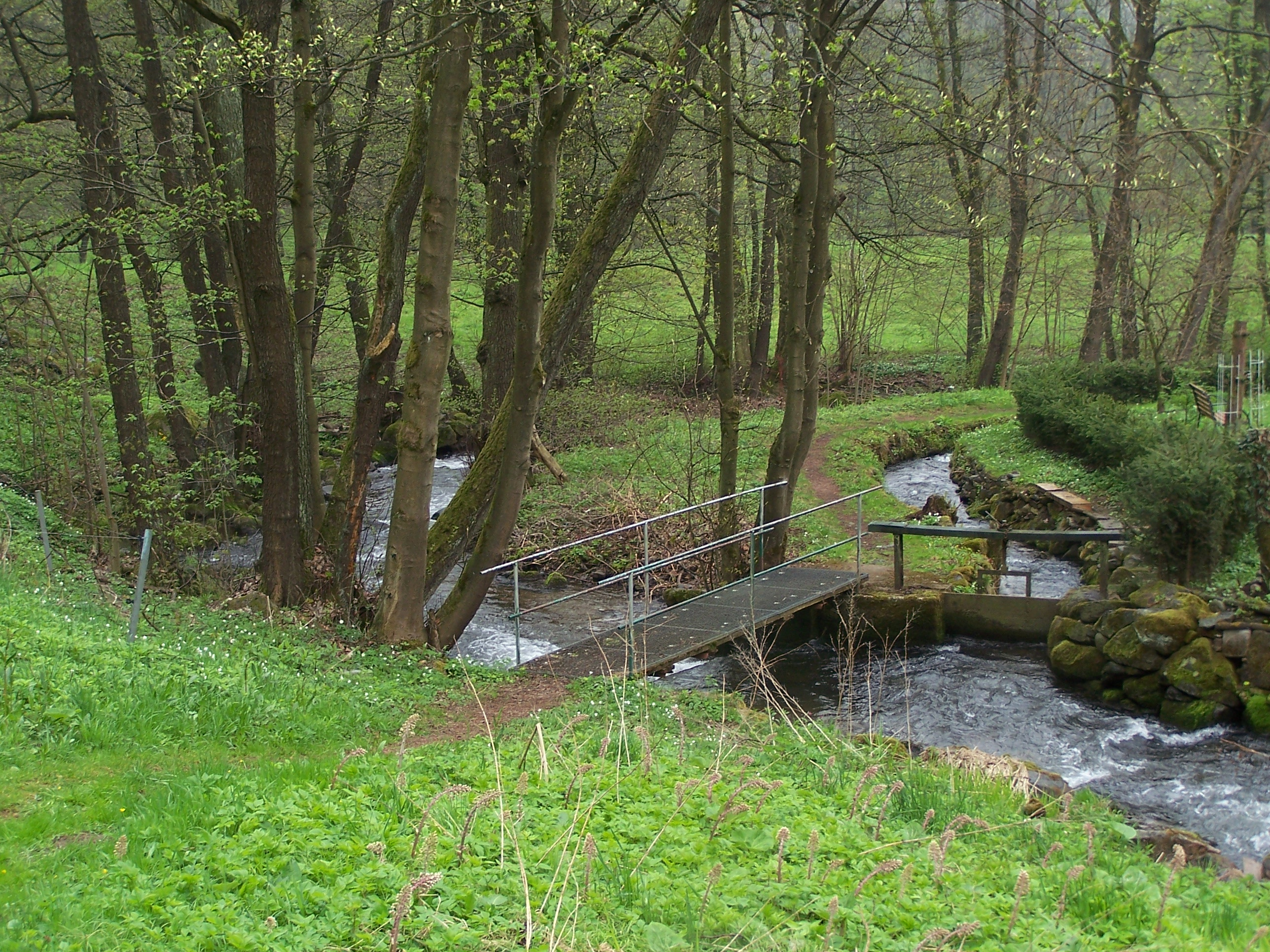

Location
- Country: Germany
- State: Thuringia

Physical characteristics
- Mouth
  - location: Werra
  - coordinates: 50.7540°N 10.3412°E
- Length: 18 km

Basin features
- Progression: Werra→ Weser→ North Sea

Truse (German pronunciation: [ˈtʁuːzə]) is a river of Thuringia, Germany. It flows into the Werra in Breitungen.

== See also ==
- List of rivers of Thuringia
