= Rinnebach (Helme) =

Location
- Country: Germany
- State: Thuringia

Physical characteristics
- Source
  - coordinates: 51.5198°N 10.4702°E
- Mouth
  - location: Stöckey
  - coordinates: 51.5304°N 10.5119°E

Rinnebach is a river of Thuringia, Germany. It is a right tributary of the Helme.

== See also ==
- List of rivers of Thuringia
