= Kotschau =

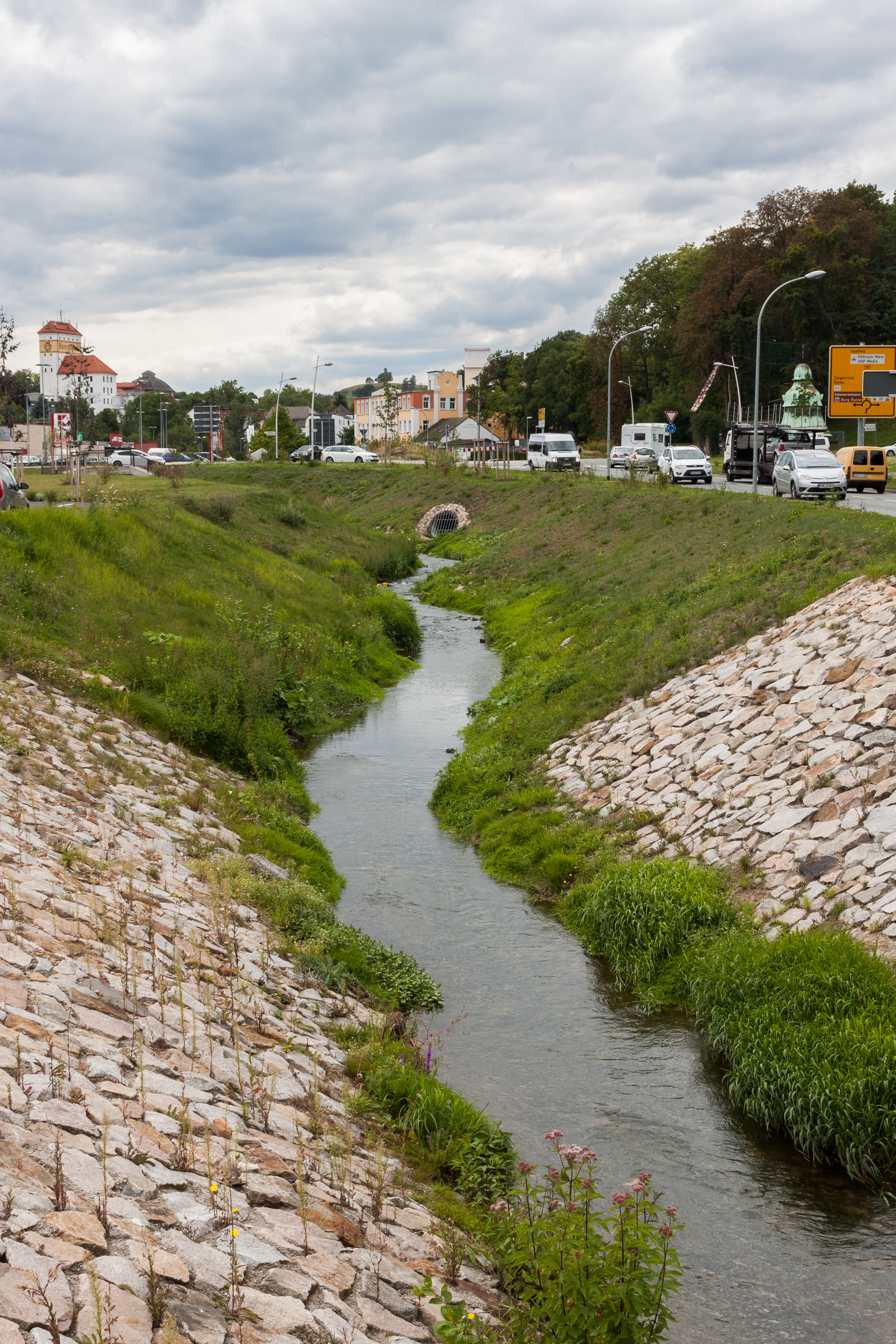

Location
- Country: Germany
- States: Thuringia

Physical characteristics
- Mouth
  - location: Orla
  - coordinates: 50.7091°N 11.6116°E

Basin features
- Progression: Orla→ Saale→ Elbe→ North Sea

Kotschau is a river of Thuringia, Germany. It flows into the Orla near Pößneck.

== See also ==
- List of rivers of Thuringia
