= Sülze (Werra) =

Location
- Country: Germany
- State: Thuringia

Physical characteristics
- Mouth
  - location: Werra
  - coordinates: 50.5418°N 10.4052°E

Basin features
- Progression: Werra→ Weser→ North Sea

Sülze (German pronunciation: [ˈzʏltsə]) is a river of Thuringia, Germany. It flows into the Werra near Untermaßfeld.

== See also ==
- List of rivers of Thuringia
