= Ifta (river) =

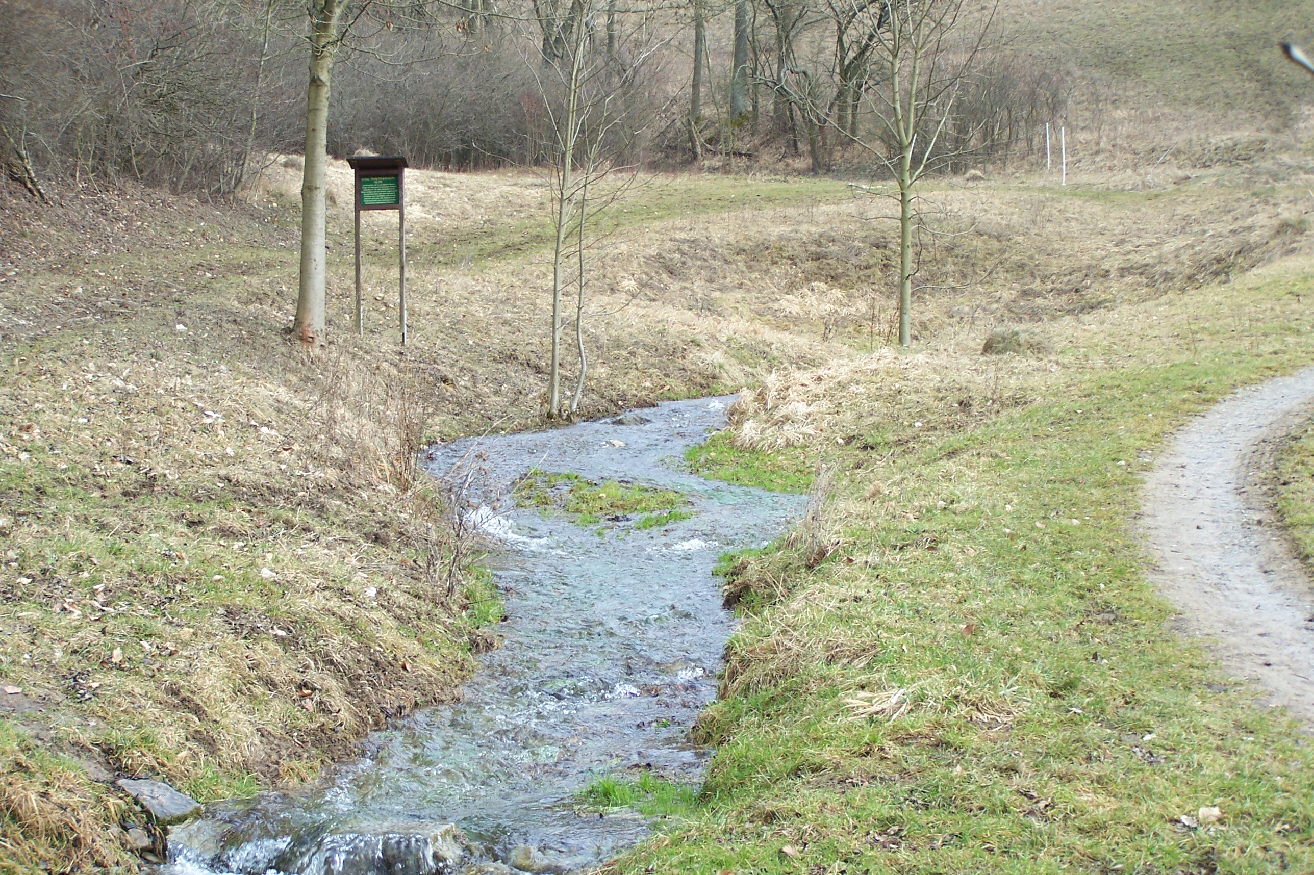

Location
- Country: Germany
- States: Thuringia

Physical characteristics
- Mouth
  - location: Werra
  - coordinates: 51°02′40″N 10°13′18″E

Basin features
- Progression: Werra→ Weser→ North Sea

Ifta (German pronunciation: [ˈɪfta]) is a river of Thuringia, Germany. It flows into the Werra between Ifta and Creuzburg.

== See also ==
- List of rivers of Thuringia
