= Lütsche-Flößgraben =

Coordinates: 50°44′13″N 10°46′03″E

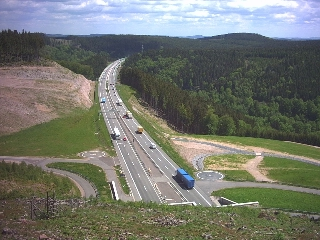
Flößgraben

Lütsche-Flößgraben is a former canal near Gräfenroda in Thuringia, Germany. It was used for timber rafting from the Thuringian Forest. It has been converted into a hiking trail, opened in 2016.

== See also ==
- List of rivers of Thuringia
