= Neubrunn (river) =

Location
- Country: Germany
- States: Thuringia

Physical characteristics
- Mouth
  - location: Schleuse
  - coordinates: 50.5227°N 10.8778°E

Basin features
- Progression: Schleuse→ Werra→ Weser→ North Sea

Neubrunn (German pronunciation: [ˈnɔʏbʁʊn]) is a river of Thuringia, Germany. It flows into the Schleuse in Schönbrunn.

== See also ==
- List of rivers of Thuringia
