= Schwarza (Ilm) =

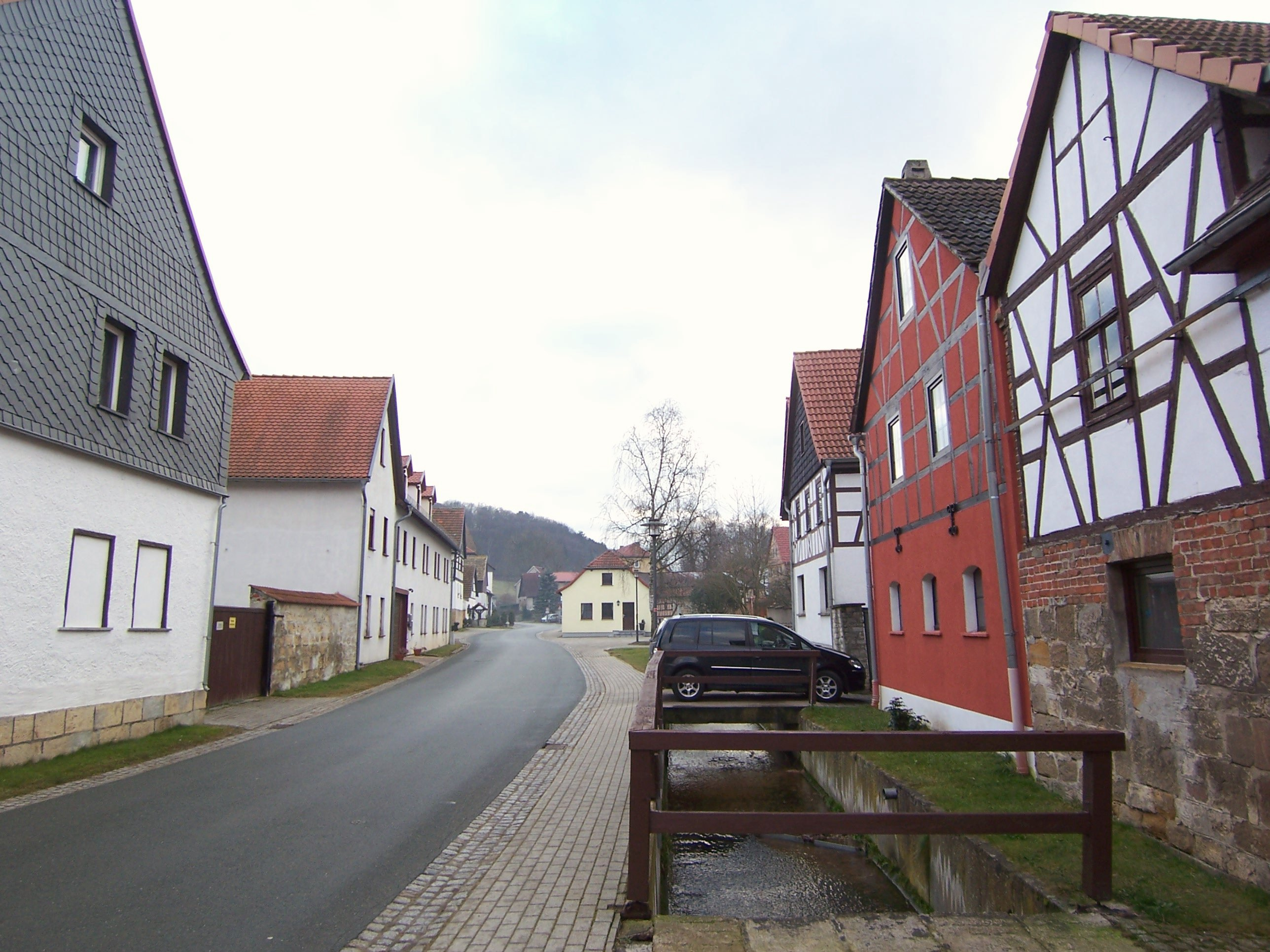

Location
- Country: Germany
- States: Thuringia

Physical characteristics
- Mouth
  - location: Ilm
  - coordinates: 50°51′39″N 11°14′50″E

Basin features
- Progression: Ilm→ Saale→ Elbe→ North Sea

The Schwarza (German pronunciation: [ˈʃvaʁtsa]) is a river of Thuringia, Germany. It joins the Ilm in Tannroda.

== See also ==
- List of rivers of Thuringia
