= Lossa (Unstrut) =

River in Germany

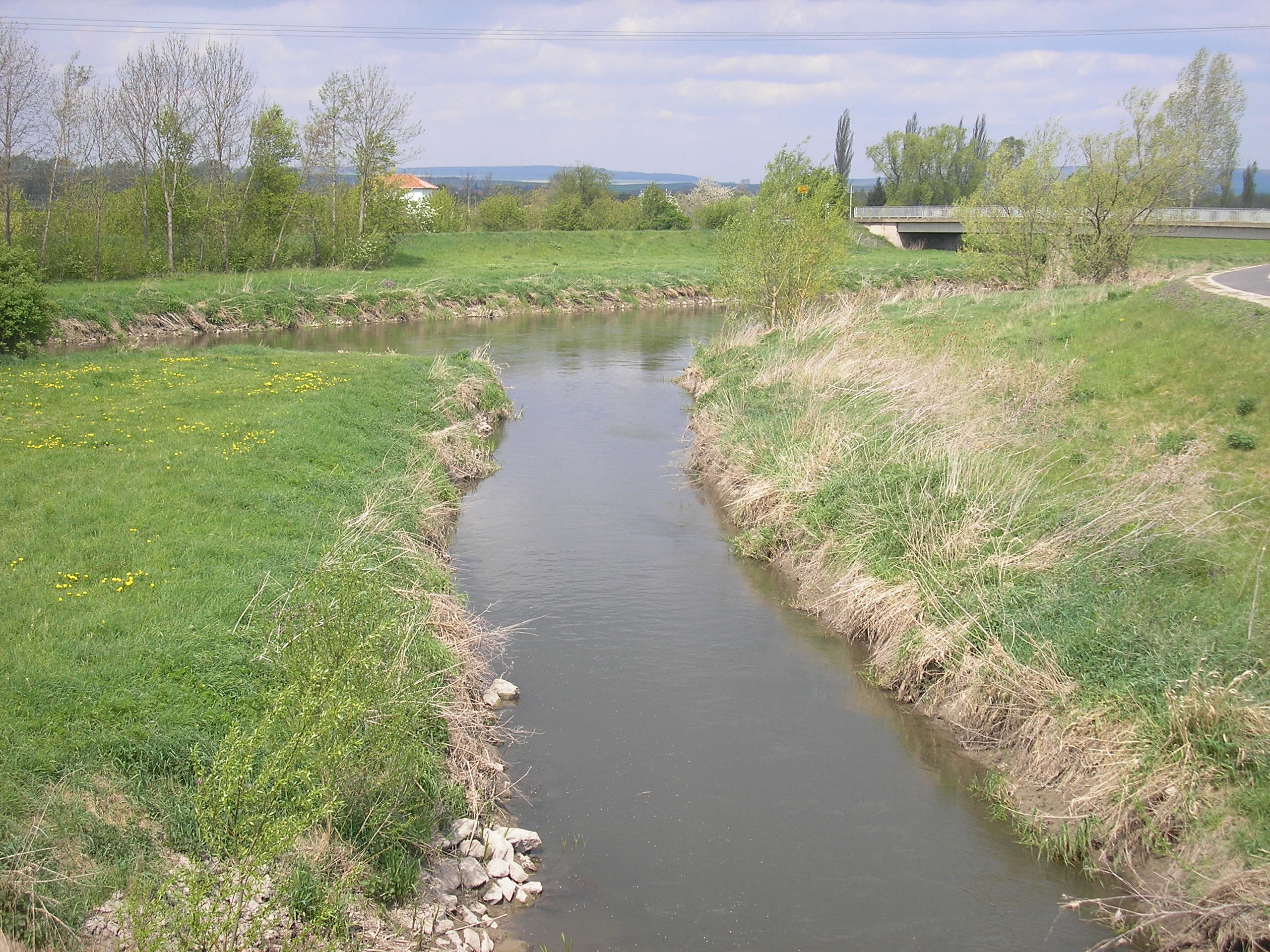

Location
- Country: Germany
- States: Saxony-Anhalt and Thuringia

Physical characteristics
- Mouth
  - location: Unstrut
  - coordinates: 51.2045°N 11.1410°E
- Length: 43.1 km (26.8 mi)
- Basin size: 394 km^{2} (152 sq mi)

Basin features
- Progression: Unstrut→ Saale→ Elbe→ North Sea

Lossa (German pronunciation: [ˈlɔsa]) is a river of Saxony-Anhalt and Thuringia, Germany. It flows into the Unstrut in Leubingen.

== See also ==
- List of rivers of Saxony-Anhalt
- List of rivers of Thuringia
