= Zeilbach (Werra) =

Location
- Country: Germany
- State: Thuringia

Physical characteristics
- Mouth
  - location: Werra
  - coordinates: 50.4524°N 10.6496°E

Basin features
- Progression: Werra→ Weser→ North Sea

Zeilbach is a river of Thuringia, Germany. It flows into the Werra in Reurieth.

== See also ==
- List of rivers of Thuringia
