= Ohne (Wipper) =

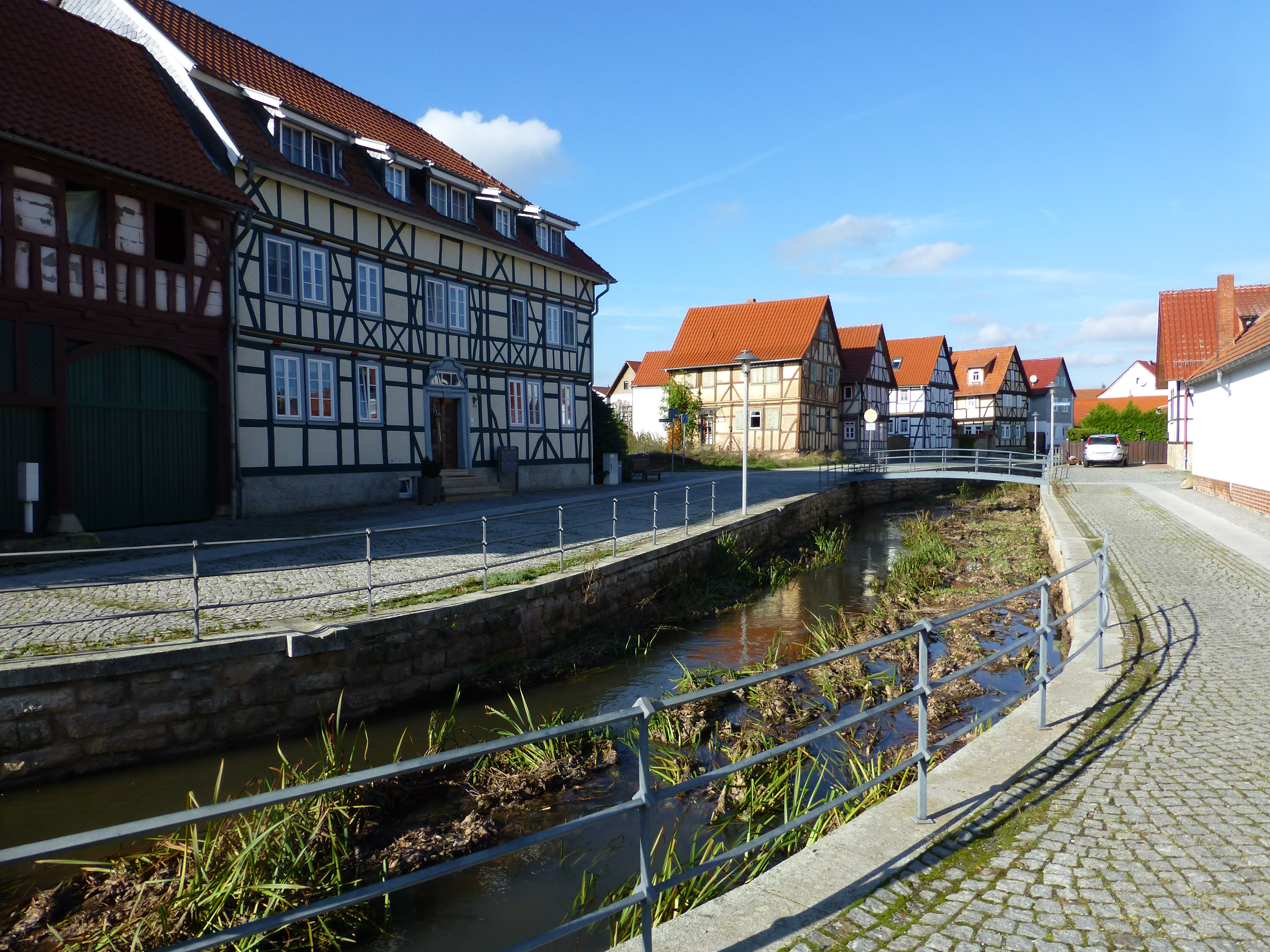

Location
- Country: Germany
- States: Thuringia

Physical characteristics
- Mouth
  - location: Wipper
  - coordinates: 51.3844°N 10.4442°E

Basin features
- Progression: Wipper→ Unstrut→ Saale→ Elbe→ North Sea

Ohne is a 14 kilometer long river of Thuringia, Germany. It flows into the Wipper near Niederorschel.

== Name ==
The name of the river has not been explained yet. The only existing documentary evidence dates from the year 900 and is indirect (Gau Ohnfelt ). The origin of the name of the village of Ohne has also not been clarified, so the place name is of no help. A derivation of the field name from the Proto-Indo-European an (to breathe), the Gothic anan (to breathe, to snort), or the Germanic *ahw- (water) seems possible.

== See also ==
- List of rivers of Thuringia
