= Oelze (river) =

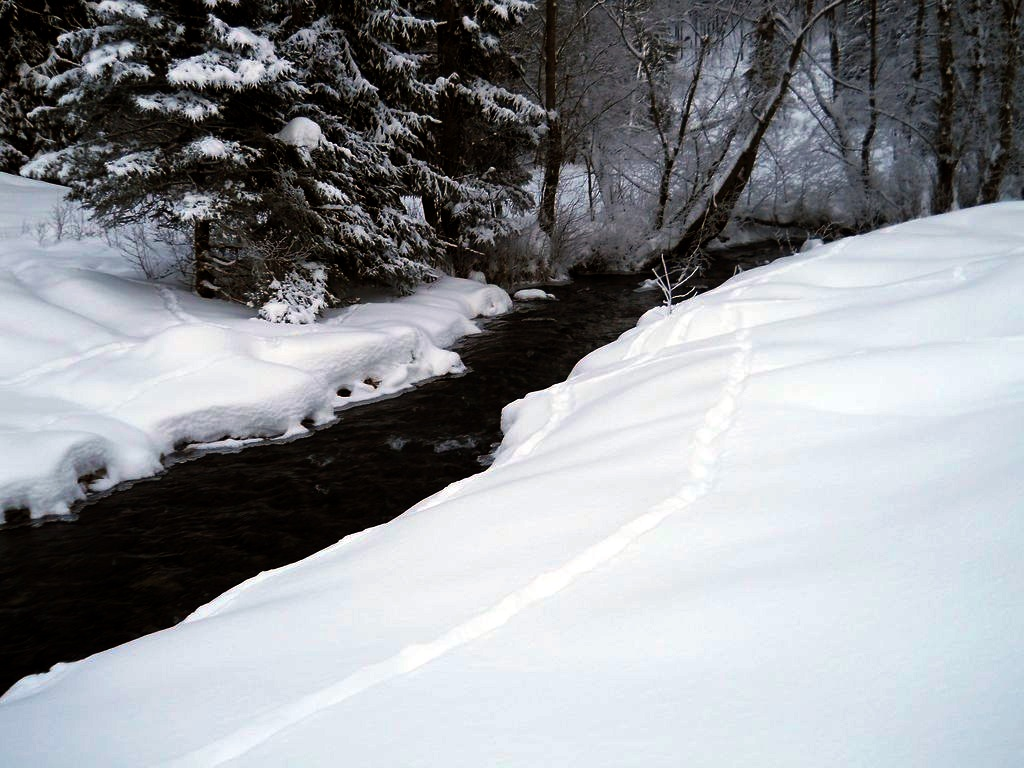

Location
- Country: Germany
- States: Thuringia

Physical characteristics
- Mouth
  - location: Schwarza
  - coordinates: 50.5454°N 11.0312°E

Basin features
- Progression: Schwarza→ Saale→ Elbe→ North Sea

Oelze is a river of Thuringia, Germany. It flows into the Schwarza in Katzhütte.

== See also ==
- List of rivers of Thuringia
