= Zimmerbach (Salza) =

River in Germany

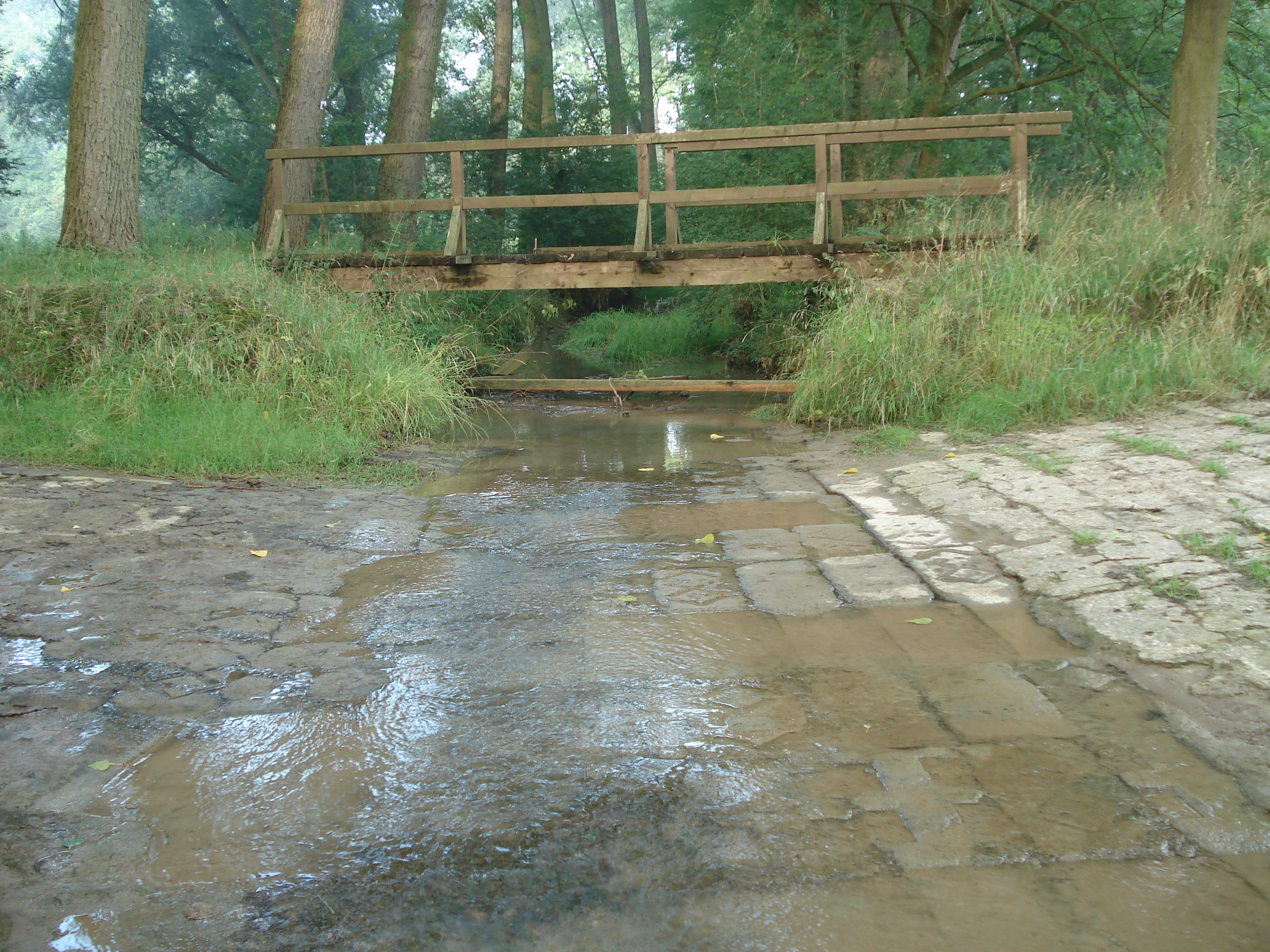

Location
- Country: Germany
- State: Thuringia

Physical characteristics
- Source
  - location: Zimmertalsgraben & Orbach
- Mouth
  - location: Salza
  - coordinates: 51.0902°N 10.6169°E
  - elevation: 205 m (673 ft)
- Length: 3.4 km (2.1 mi)

Basin features
- Progression: Salza→ Unstrut→ Saale→ Elbe→ North Sea

Zimmerbach is a river of Thuringia, Germany. It flows for 3 kilometres (1.9 mi) before joining the Salza near Bad Langensalza.

== Gallery ==
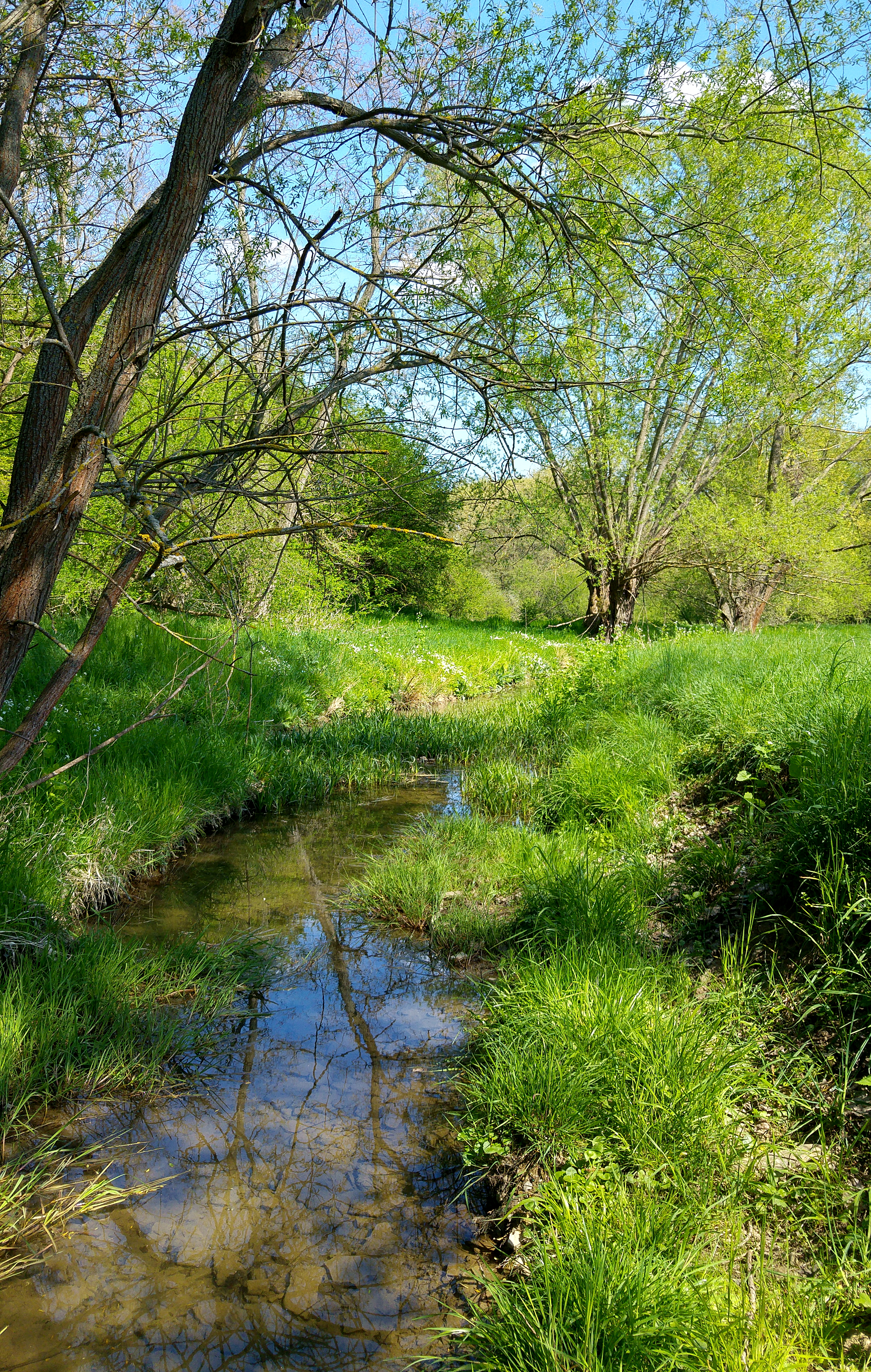

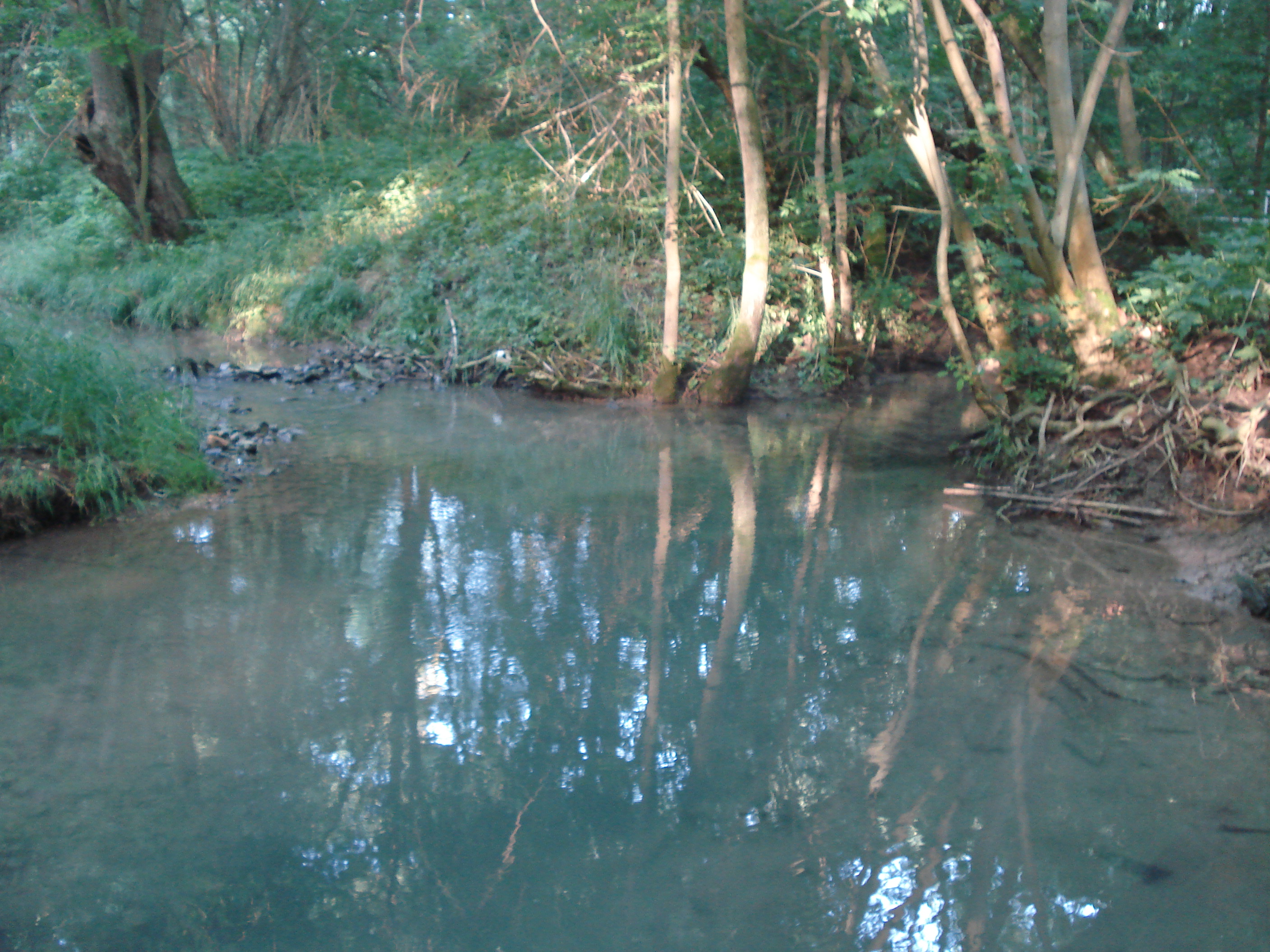
Mouth of the Zimmerbach into the Salza

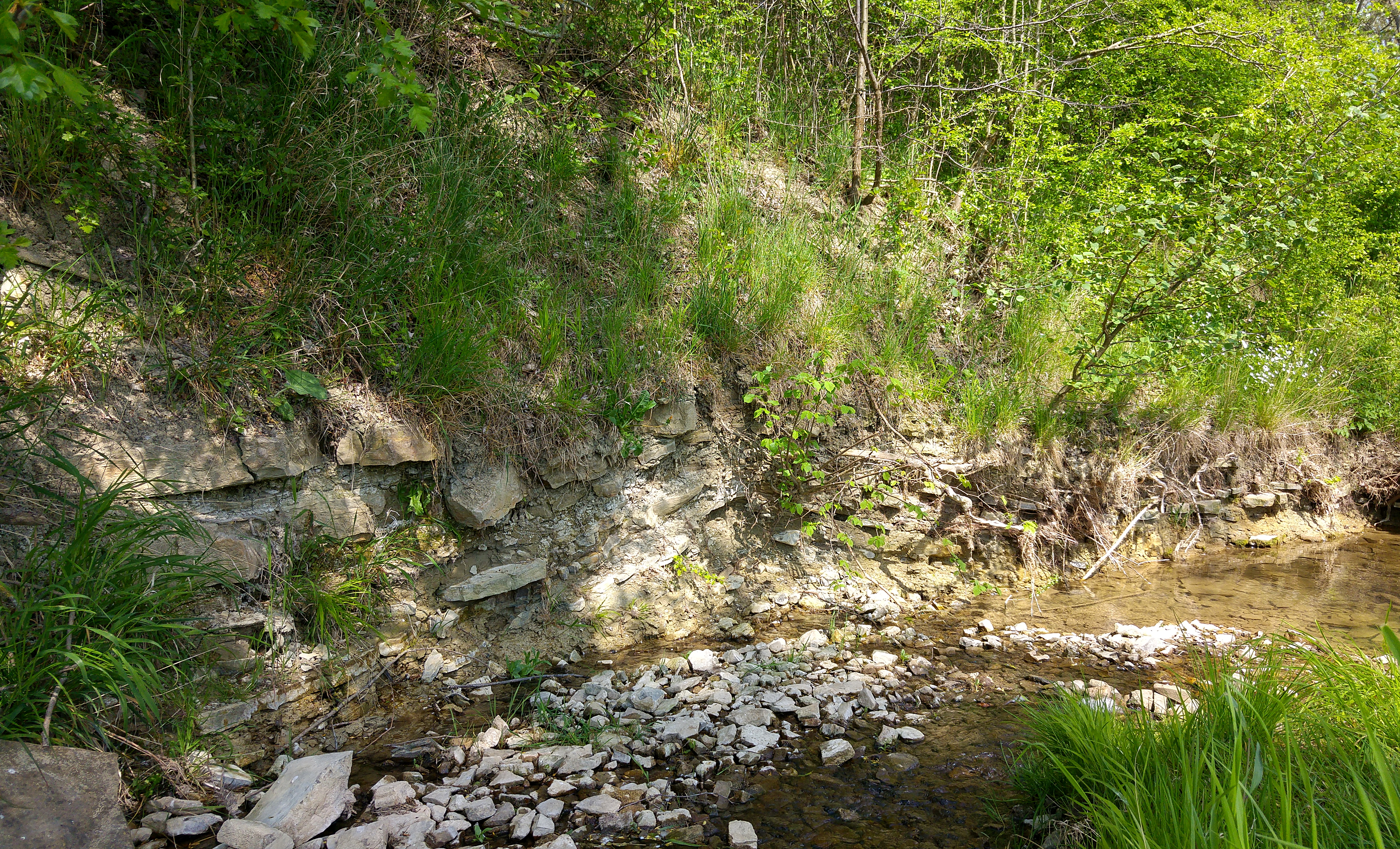
Mouth of the Hellerbach into the Zimmerbach

== See also ==
- List of rivers of Thuringia
