= Großer Farmdenkopf =

Mountain in Thuringia, Germany

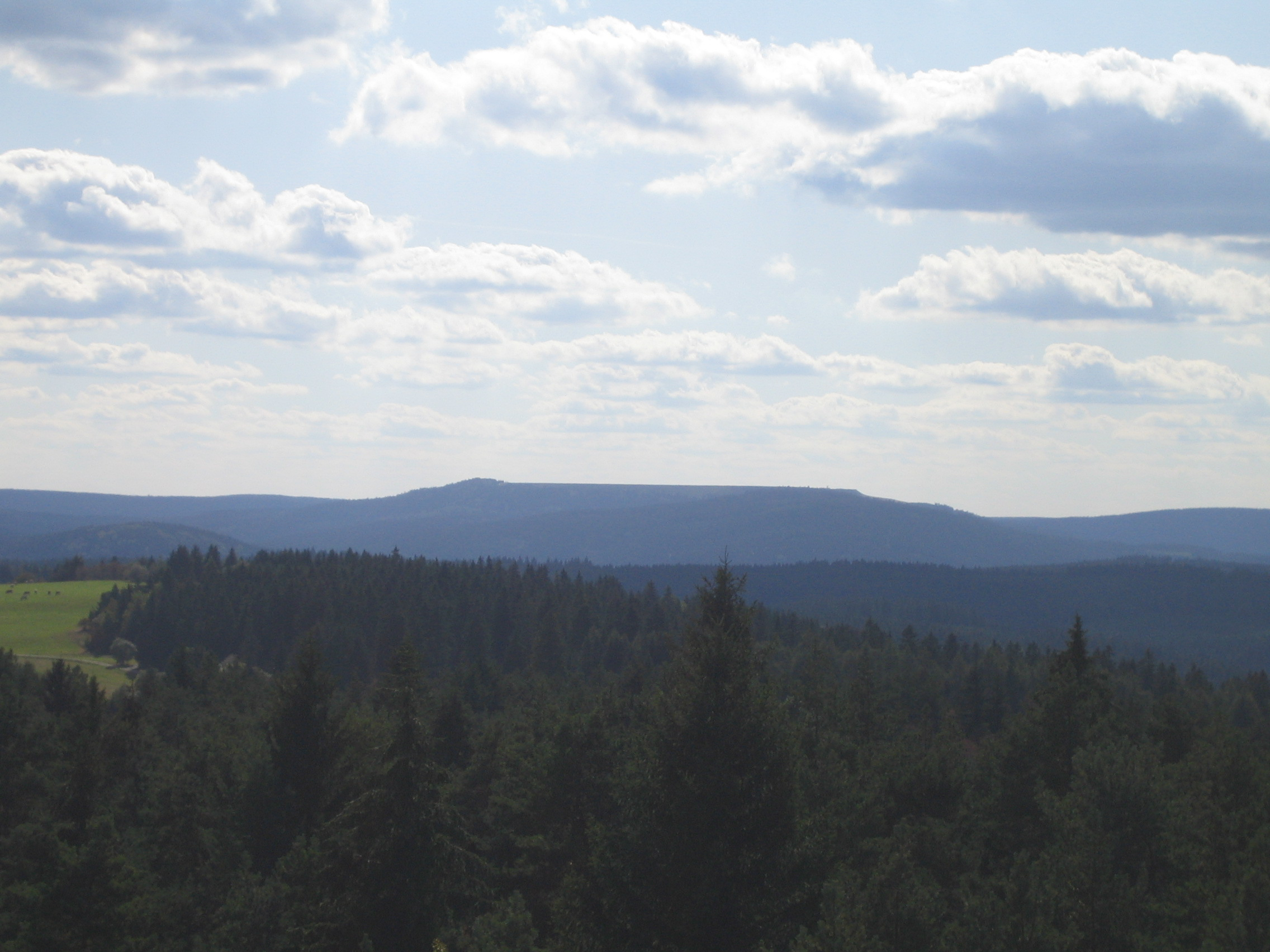
- The dyke of the upper basin is clearly visible from the level mountain top

Highest point
- Elevation: 869 m above sea level (NN) (2,851 ft)
- Prominence: 171 m ↓ crossroads east of Gießübel
- Isolation: 21.3 km → Großer Finsterberg (944 m)
- Listing: highest summit of the Thuringian Highland
- Coordinates: 50°30′33″N 11°02′02″E

Geography
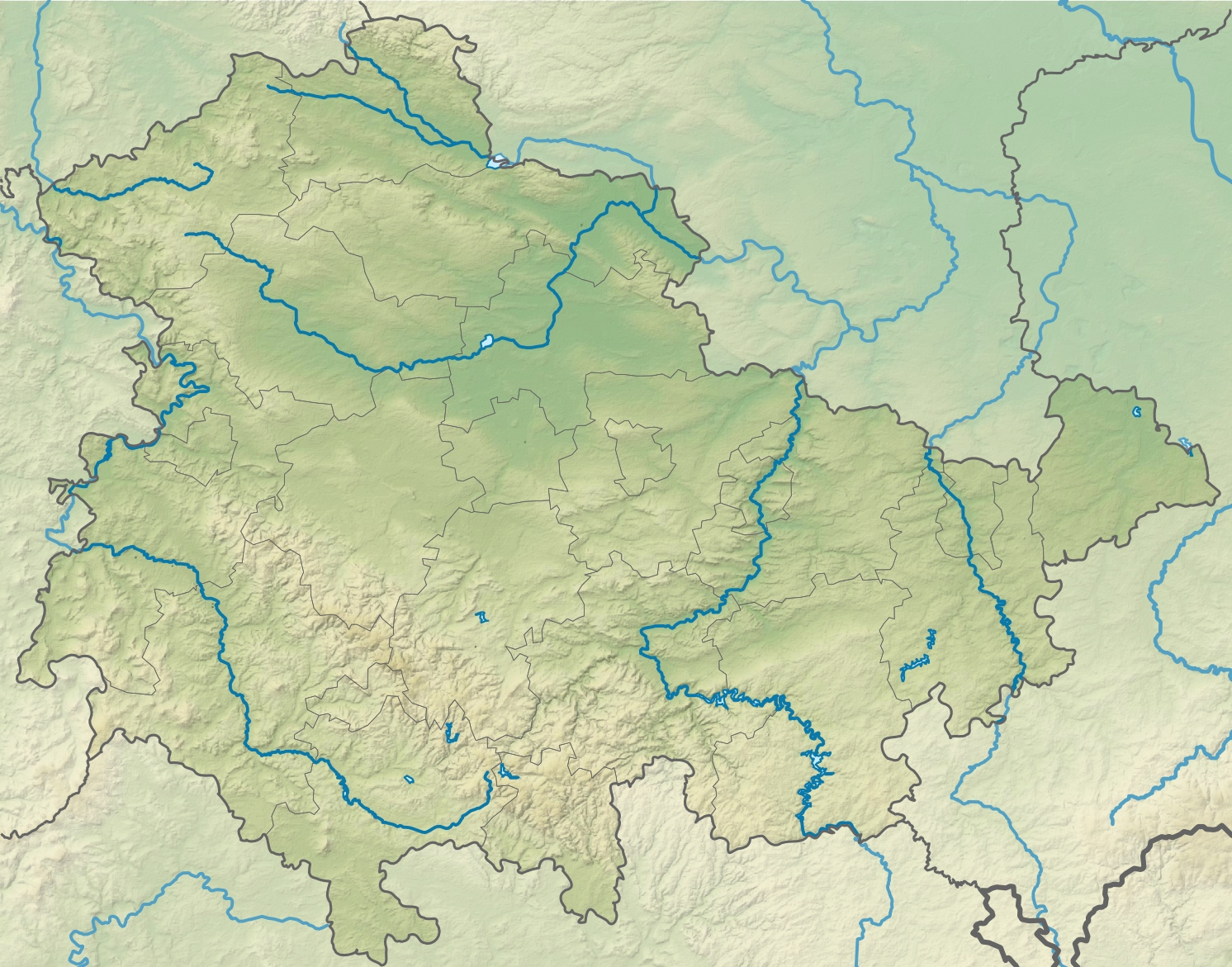
- Location within Thuringia
- Location: Thuringia, Germany
- Parent range: Thuringian Highland

Climbing
- Normal route: from the Thuringian Porcelain Road (L 1112) near Scheibe-Alsbach

At 869 m above sea level (NN), the Großer Farmdenkopf is the highest peak in the Thuringian Highland. It is situated in the county of Sonneberg in the German state of Thuringia.

== Location ==
The Großer Farmdenkopf is the highest point of the Wurzelberg massif in the northwest of the county of Sonneberg southeast of Goldisthal, which lies in the deeply incised Schwarza valley, and northwest of nearby Scheibe-Alsbach, which is a little further away and sprawls out above the river in the same valley. The whole of the massif lies north of the Rennsteig and thus in the Northern High Slate Mountains (Nördlichen Hohen Schiefergebirge).

== Isolation and prominence ==
With a topographic isolation of over 20 kilometres, the Großer Farmdenkopf is one of the most dominant mountains in Thuringia. Only the Großer Finsterberg (944 m), 21.3 km away, the Großer Eisenberg (907 m) and Neuhäuser Hügel (892 m), 21.8 km away to the northwest, are higher.

In order to reach the Finsterberg, one must descend to a height of at least about 698 metres, which gives a topographic prominence of 171 metres. The col is immediately next to the Schwalbenhaupt in the extreme northeast of the highland near its boundary with the Central Thuringian Forest, at the crossroads of the Landesstraße from Masserberg to Neustadt, near the Rennsteig, and the one crossing the ridge and running from Gießübel to Oelze.

== Goldisthal Pumped Storage Station ==
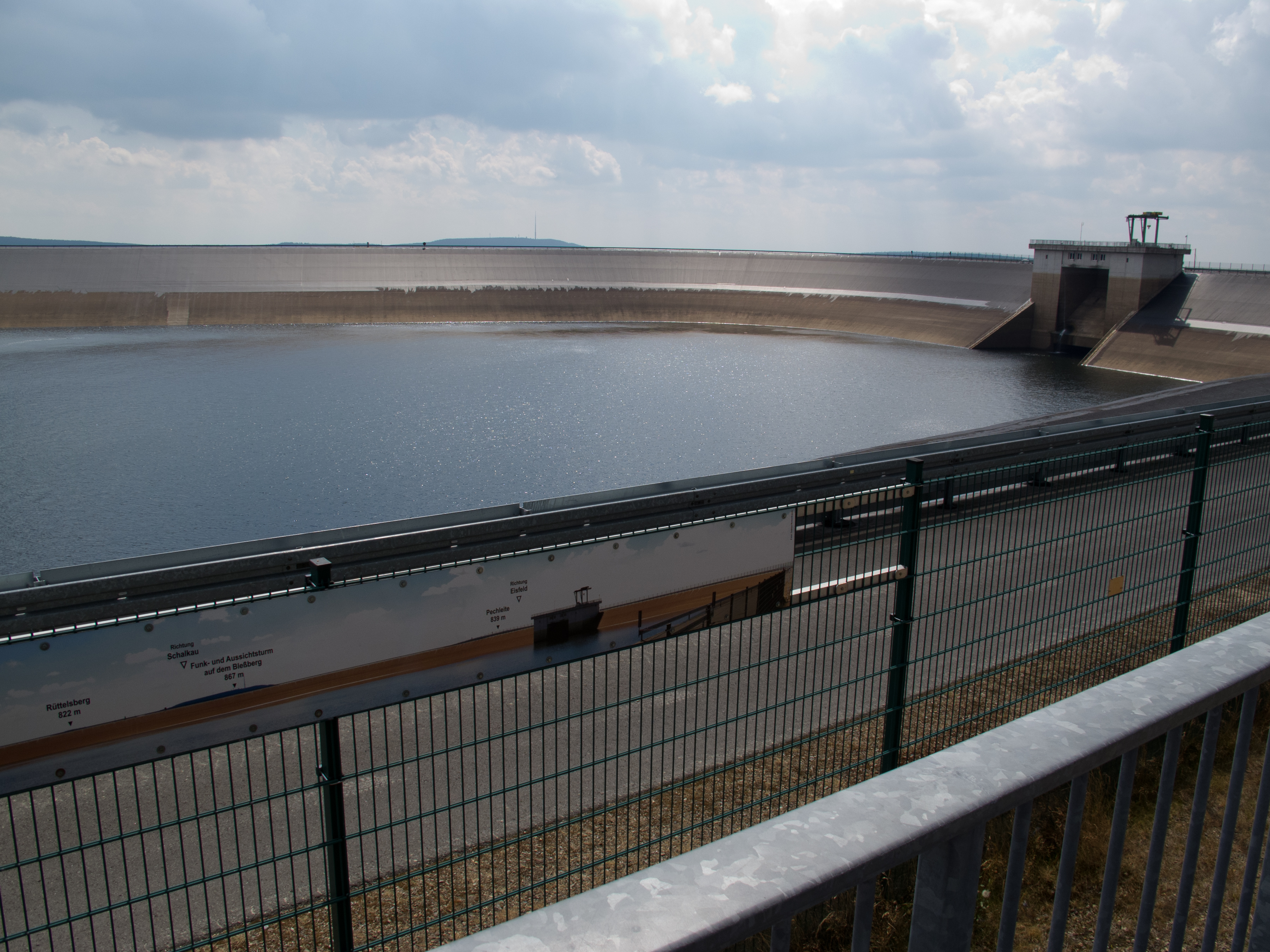
View over the upper basin of PSW Goldisthal on the Großer Farmdenkopf looking south-southwest. Background: the transmission tower on the Bleßberg

The appearance of the Großer Farmdenkopf from a distance is mainly characterised by the upper basin of the Goldisthal Pumped Storage Station (877 m above NN), built on the top of the mountain. Only the tips of the trees on the summit are higher than the dykes of the basin.

== Hiking and viewing points ==
From the Großer Farmdenkopf there is a unique all-round view of the Thurigian Highland and Thuringian Forest. The numerous viewing points may be visited on a 360 degree circular walk around the upper basin of the Goldisthal Pumped Storage Station; a full circuit requires the negotiation of several hundred metres along a very narrow ridge.

Amongst the other mountains visible from the summit are the Großer Gleichberg (679 m, ein Inselberg), Adlersberg (849.9 m), Großer Eisenberg (907 m), Großer Finsterberg (944 m), Schneekopf (978 m), Großer Beerberg (983 m), Kickelhahn (861 m), Kieferle (868 m), Dürre Fichte (861 m), Bleßberg (867 m, with its transmission site and viewing tower) and Eselsberg (841.5 m, Rennsteigwarte) as well as e.g. the mountain villages of Neustadt am Rennsteig, Masserberg and Neuhaus am Rennweg.

== See also ==
List of mountains and hills of Thuringia
