= Simmersberg =

Mountain in Germany

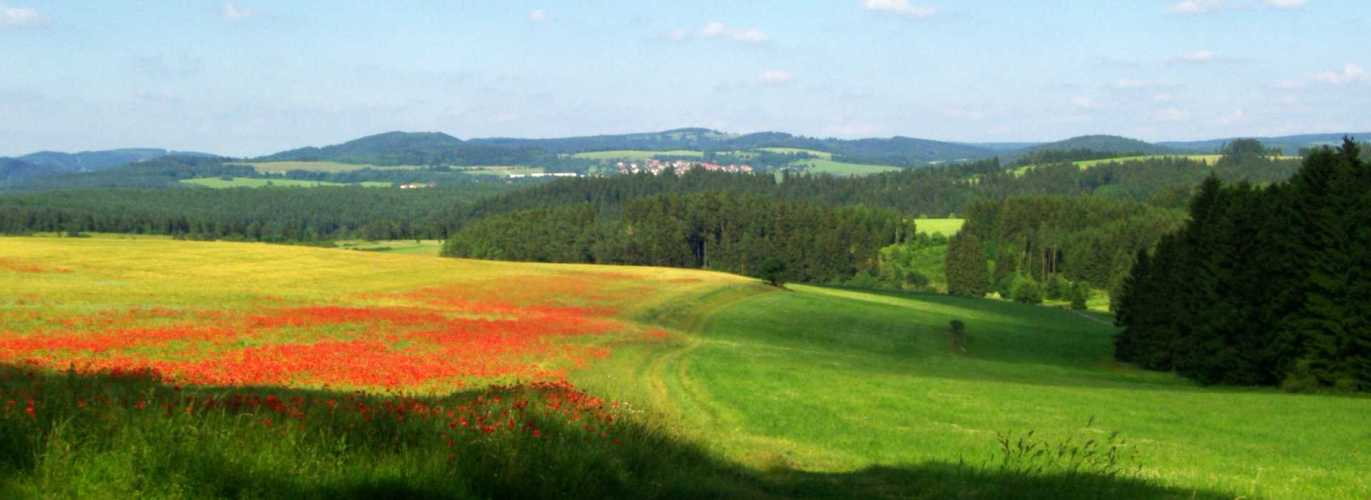
- The Simmersberg near Schnett

Highest point
- Elevation: 780.8 m above sea level (NHN) (2,562 ft)
- Isolation: 4 km → Grendel (787,2 m)
- Coordinates: 50°30′09″N 10°53′36″E

Geography
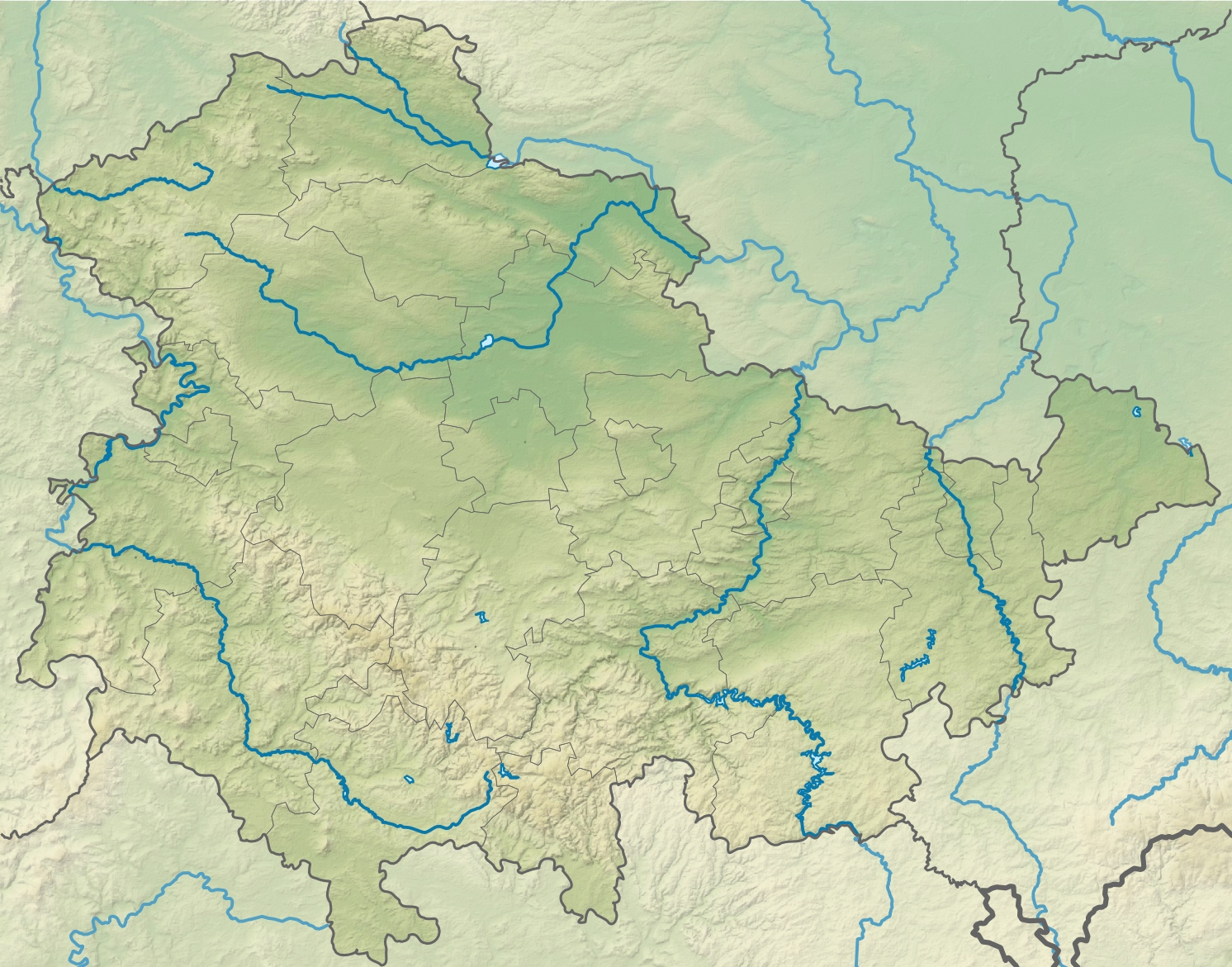
- Location within Thuringia
- Location: Thuringia, Germany
- Parent range: Thuringian Forest / Thuringian Highland

Geology
- Mountain type: Extinct volcano
- Rock type: Basalt

The Simmersberg is a mountain, 780.8 m above sea level (NHN), near Schnett in the municipality of Masserberg) in the county of Hildburghausen in Germany. It is the main summit of a forked mountain chain, which runs along the boundary between the Thuringian Forest and the Thuringian Highland from Masserberg towards the southwest and is bounded by the valleys of the Schleuse (in the northwest) and its tributary, the Biber (in the south).

Other subpeaks of the ridge are the Hohe Warth (718 m) in the west, the Kohlberg (718 m) in the southwest, the Schnetter Berg (757 m) in the north and the Höheberg (780 m) in the northeast. The volcanic origins within the otherwise non-volcanic mountain ridge can be recognised especially well near the Simmersberg and its two 718 metre-high pre-summits.

The 740-metre-high Holzberg, which is 2 km northeast and adjacent to the Schnetter Berg and north of the Höheberg, separated by a deep valley from the Simmersberg peaks, must be considered as an independent mountain.

== Views ==
Because the summit of the Simmersberg, on which there used to be an inn, but now has a youth hostel, is largely treeless, the mountain has an extensive view in all directions without the need for climbing a tower. In good visibility the outline of the Rhön in the west may be seen as well as the less high Haßberge hills to the south.

Still clearly outside the Thuringian Forest, but somewhat closer is the Dolmar near Meiningen (740 m) over 30 km away to the west, and the Gleichberge (642 and 679 m) to the southwest, 25 km distant – all three are clearly of volcanic origin. To the left and east of them are the ruins of Straufhain Castle (449 m) and Coburg Fortress (464 m).

North (right) of the Dolmar in clear weather can be seen the Pleß (645 m), 52 km away to the northwest and, in the extreme northeast the Anterior Rhön can be made out. Immediately right of that and about 14 to 20 km distant – and visible in even moderately good conditions – are the highest points of the Thuringian Forest:

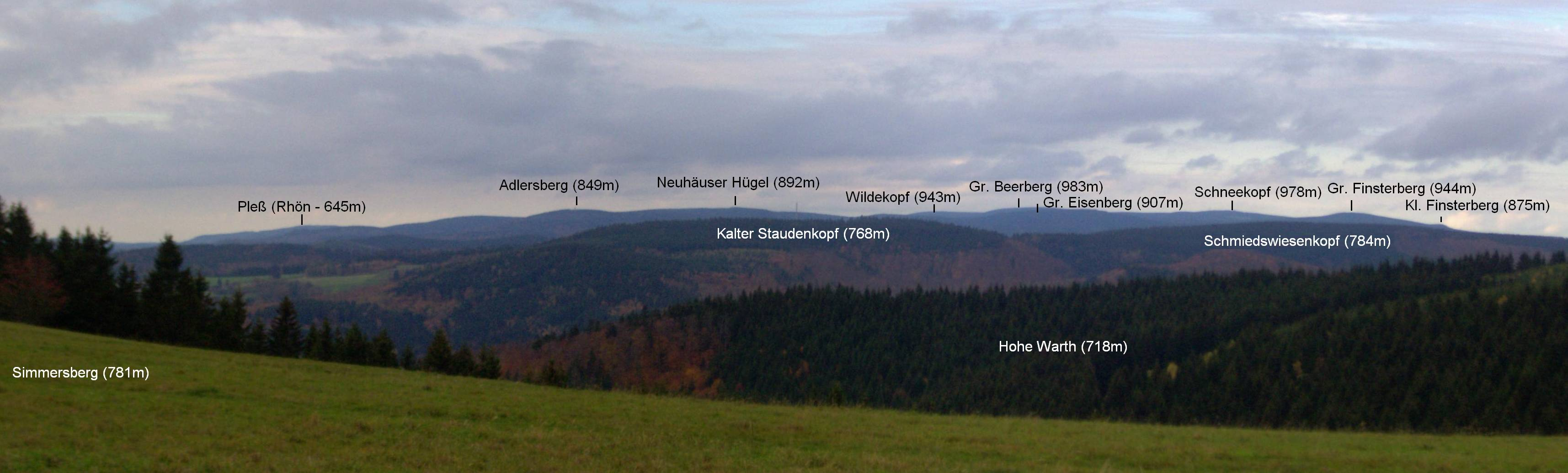
View of the highest mountains of the Thuringian Forest: Adlersberg (849.9 m) with the Neuhäuser Hügel (891 m), Wildekopf (943 m), Großer Beerberg (partly hidden, 983 m), Großer Eisenberg (907 m), Schneekopf (978 m), Großer (944 m) and Kleiner (875 m) Finsterberg; in the foreground, the Kalter Staudenkopf (768 m) and Schmiedswiesenkopf (784 m) – the Große Riesenhaupt (764 m) near Frauenwald and the Große Hundskopf (824 m) near Allzunah are to the right – as well as the subpeak of Hohe Warth (718 m); left in the background the 52 km distant Pleß (645 m) in the Anterior Rhön.

In the east lies the nearby Rennsteigwarte watchtower on the Eselsberg (841.5 m) near Masserberg, to the southeast just 3 km away, but separated by the deep valley of the Biber, is the mining village of Waffenrod/Hinterrod with the mountains of Klingeberg (677.2 m), Eckartsberg (760.4 m) and Grendel (787.2 m).

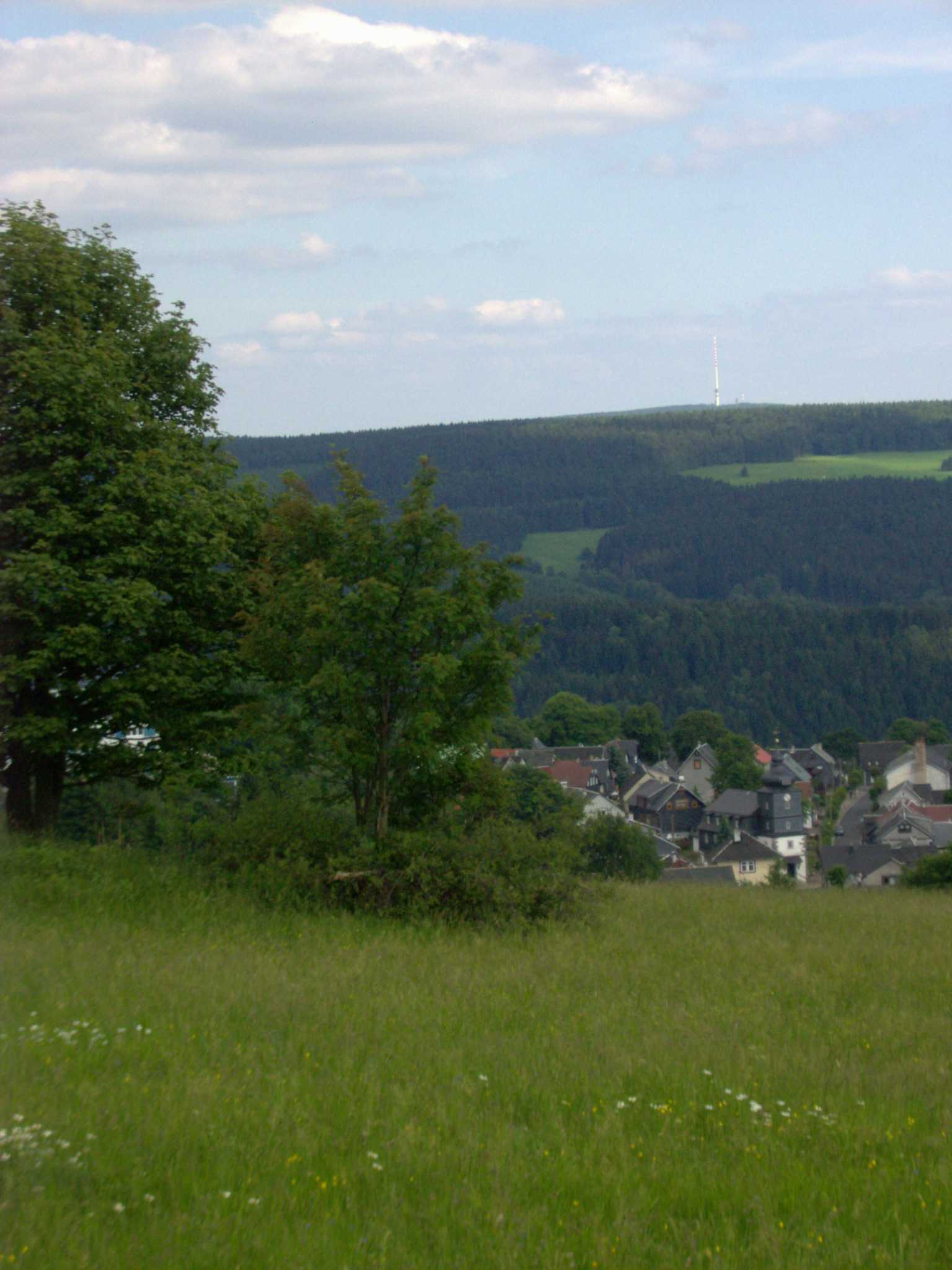
View of Schnett, the Grendel (787 m) and the Bleßberg (866,9 m, antenna)

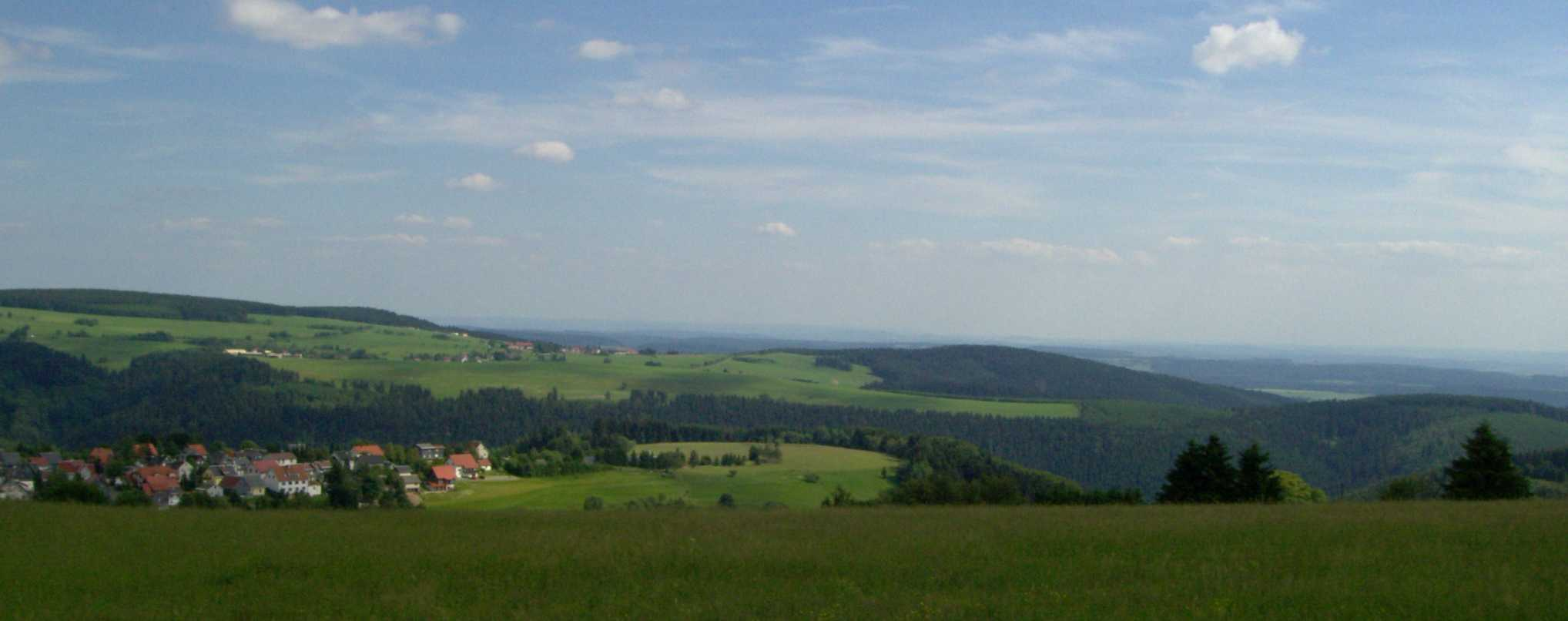
View of Schnett (foreground) and Waffenrod/Hinterrod (background, between the Eckartsberg (760 m, left) and Klingeberg (677 m, right))

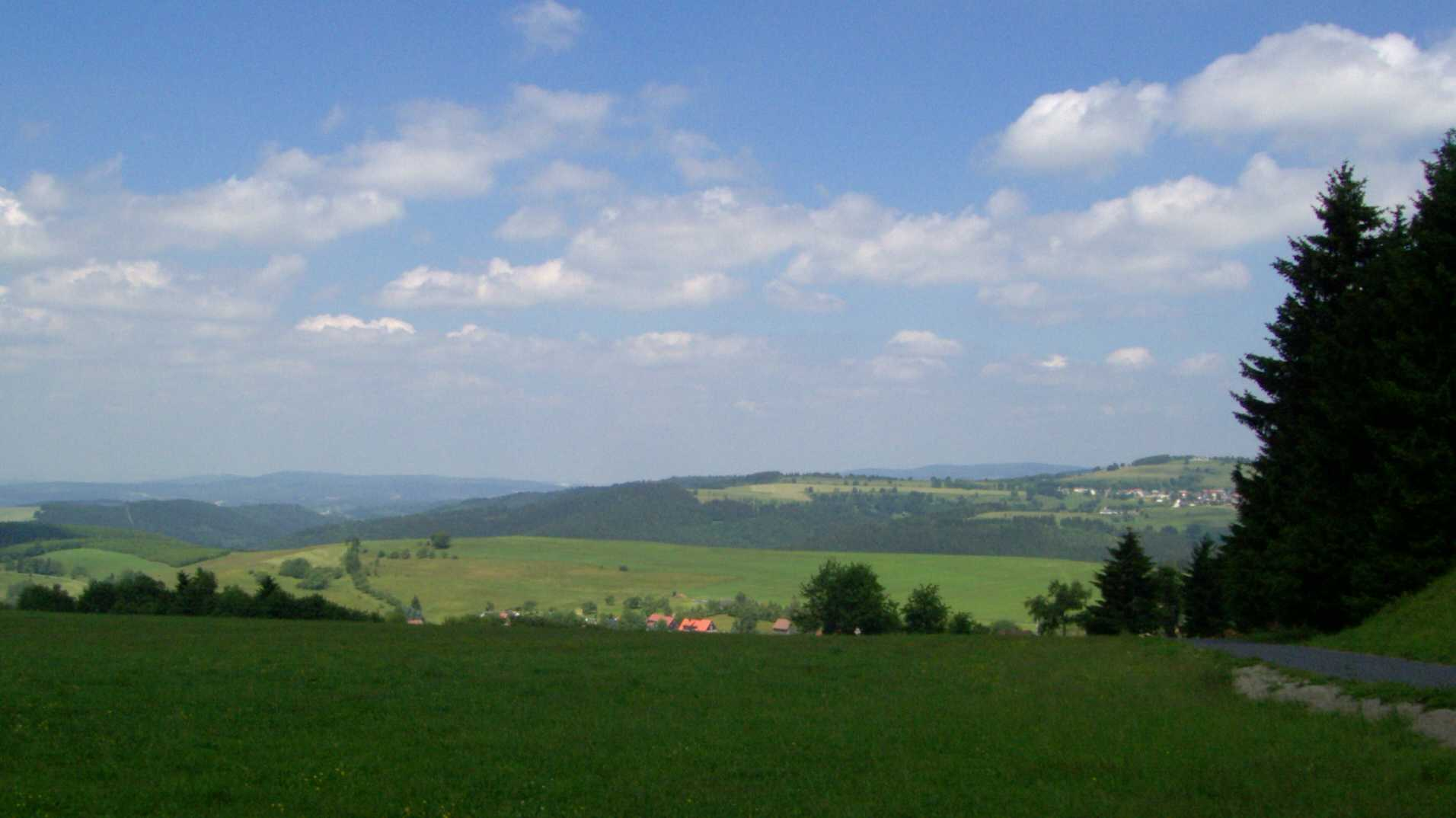
View from the Eckartsberg of Schnett and the Simmersberg (781 m, right) with its subpeak, the Kohlberg (718 m, centre). Between them in the background can be seen the Adlersberg (849,9 m) with the Neuhäuser Hügel (891 m). Left of the Kohlberg in the background is the trading estate of Suhl-Friedberg and the Little Thuringian Forest with the Schleusinger Berg (671 m) and Schneeberg (692 m). Front centre is the village of Waffenrod/Hinterrod.

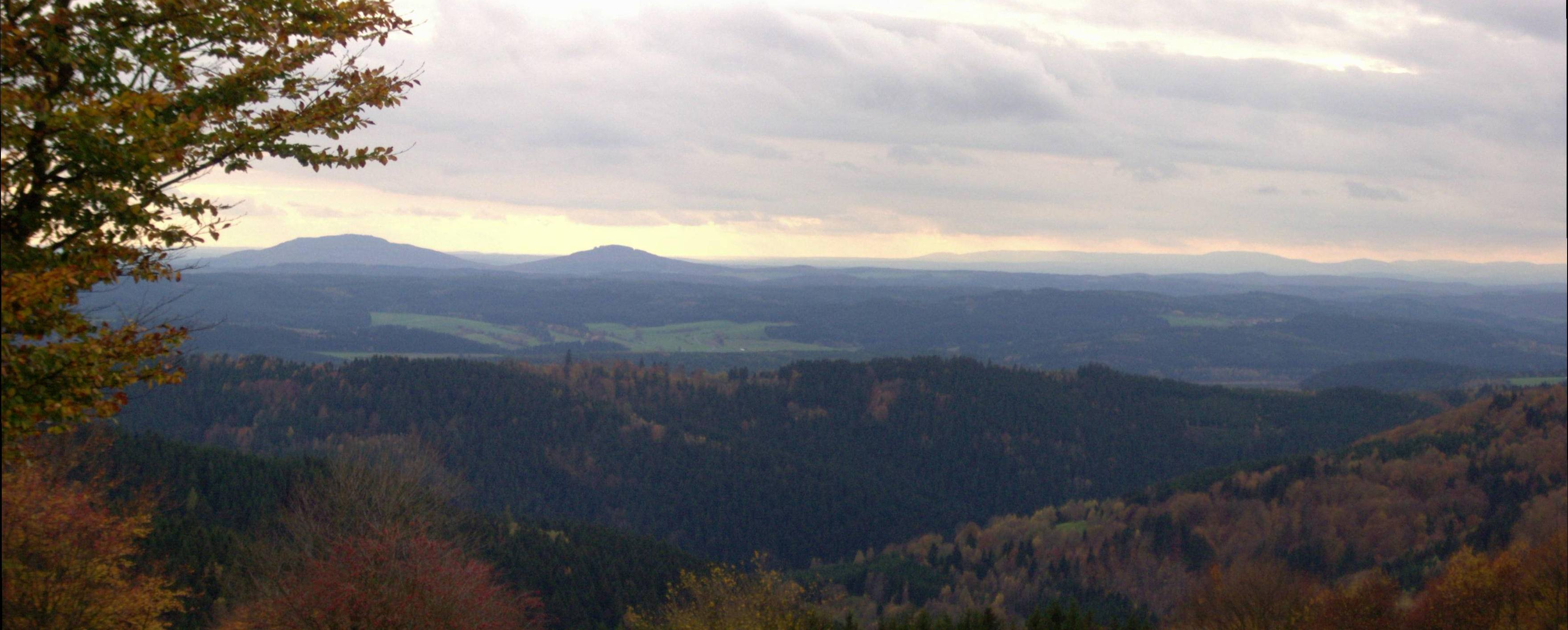
View of the Gleichberge (679 and 641 m), 24 km away. Right in the background is the High Rhön with the 928-m-high Kreuzberg 67 km away, immediately in front (centre half right) the 7-km-distant Ratscher Bergsee. In the foreground is the 621-m-high, Wachberg, 3 km away

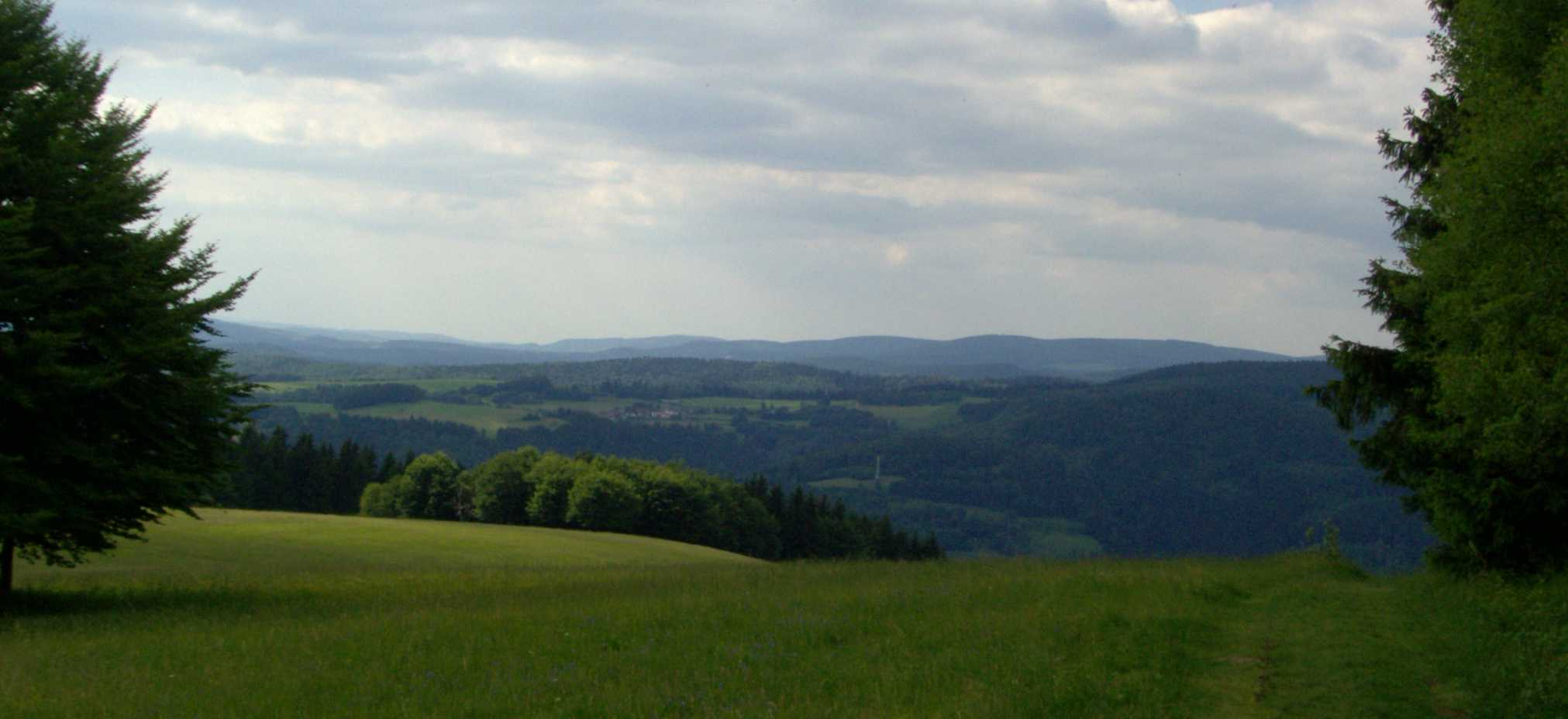
View of the Pleß (645 m, left of centre, 52 km away) in the northeast of the Vordere Rhön and the 14-km-distant Adlersberg (849,9 m) with the Neuhäuser Hügel (891 m)

== See also ==
- List of mountains and hills in Thuringia
