= Sonneberg I =

Electoral constituency in Thuringia, Germany

Sonneberg I is an electoral constituency (German: Wahlkreis) represented in the Landtag of Thuringia. It elects one member via first-past-the-post voting. Under the current constituency numbering system, it is designated as constituency 19. It covers the southern part of the Sonneberg district, including the city of Sonneberg.

Sonneberg I was created for the 1994 Thuringian state election. Since 2024, it has been represented by Jürgen Treutler of Alternative for Germany (AfD).

== Geography ==
As of the 2019 state election, Sonneberg I covers the southern part of the Sonneberg district, specifically the municipalities of Bachfeld, Föritztal, Frankenblick, Schalkau, and Sonneberg.

== Members ==
The constituency was held by the Christian Democratic Union from its creation in 1994 until 2024. Its first representative was Christine Zitzmann, who served from 1994 to 2009, and then Beate Meißner until 2024. Jürgen Treutler of the Alternative for Germany gained the seat in 2024.

| Election | Member | Party | % |
|---|---|---|---|
| 1994 | Christine Zitzmann | CDU | 37.0 |
| 1999 | Christine Zitzmann | CDU | 50.3 |
| 2004 | Christine Zitzmann | CDU | 45.1 |
| 2009 | Beate Meißner | CDU | 43.2 |
| 2014 | Beate Meißner | CDU | 48.1 |
| 2019 | Beate Meißner | CDU | 41.5 |
| 2024 | Jürgen Treutler | AfD | 40.2 |

== Election results ==
=== 2024 election ===
State election (2024): Sonneberg I
| Notes: | Blue background denotes the winner of the electorate vote. Pink background denotes a candidate elected from their party list. Yellow background denotes an electorate win by a list member, or other incumbent. A ✓ or ✗ denotes status of any incumbent, win or lose respectively. | | | | | | |
| Party | Candidate | Votes | % | ±% | Party votes | % | ±% |
|---|---|---|---|---|---|---|---|
| AfD | Jürgen Treutler | 9,680 | 42.6 | ▲15.2 | 9,201 | 40.2 | ▲12.9 |
| CDU | ✗ Beate Meißner | 8,914 | 39.3 | ▼2.2 | 5,708 | 24.9 | ▼2.2 |
| BSW | | | | | 3,470 | 15.2 | |
| Left | Susanna Karawanskij | 2,209 | 9.7 | ▼10.8 | 2,385 | 10.4 | ▼18.0 |
| SPD | Thomas Hofmann | 834 | 3.7 | ▼1.2 | 793 | 3.5 | ▼2.6 |
| Greens | | | | | 267 | 1.2 | ▼2.1 |
| FW | Robert Bauer | 636 | 2.8 | | 245 | 1.1 | |
| ÖDP | Martin Truckenbrodt | 307 | 1.4 | ▲0.5 | 83 | 0.4 | ▼0.4 |
| APT | | | | | 200 | 0.9 | ▼0.3 |
| FDP | | | | | 158 | 0.7 | ▼2.0 |
| BD | | | | | 103 | 0.5 | |
| Values | | | | | 99 | 0.4 | |
| Familie | | | | | 67 | 0.3 | |
| Pirates | | | | | 56 | 0.2 | ▼0.1 |
| MLPD | Andreas Eifler | 122 | 0.5 | ▲0.2 | 47 | 0.2 | ▼0.1 |
| Informal votes | | 375 | | | 195 | | |
| Total valid votes | | 22,702 | | | 22,882 | | |
| Turnout | | 23,077 | 72.0 | ▲10.6 | | | |
| AfD gain from CDU | Majority | 766 | 3.3 | | | | |

=== 2019 election ===
State election (2019): Sonneberg I
| Notes: | Blue background denotes the winner of the electorate vote. Pink background denotes a candidate elected from their party list. Yellow background denotes an electorate win by a list member, or other incumbent. A ✓ or ✗ denotes status of any incumbent, win or lose respectively. | | | | | | |
| Party | Candidate | Votes | % | ±% | Party votes | % | ±% |
|---|---|---|---|---|---|---|---|
| CDU | ✓ Beate Meißner | 8,584 | 41.5 | ▼6.6 | 5,611 | 27.1 | ▼10.5 |
| AfD | Robert Sesselmann | 5,670 | 27.4 | | 5,651 | 27.3 | ▲16.0 |
| Left | Knut Korschewsky | 4,243 | 20.5 | ▼10.2 | 5,880 | 28.4 | ▼1.5 |
| SPD | Petra Lenk | 1,011 | 4.9 | ▼8.2 | 1,258 | 6.1 | ▼4.7 |
| Greens | Beate Kittel | 551 | 2.7 | ▼1.4 | 680 | 3.3 | ▼0.3 |
| FDP | Christian Wollny | 376 | 1.8 | | 552 | 2.7 | ▲1.1 |
| ÖDP | Martin Truckenbrodt | 195 | 0.9 | | 169 | 0.8 | |
| MLPD | Andreas Eifler | 54 | 0.3 | | 65 | 0.3 | |
| List-only parties | | | | | 845 | 4.1 | |
| Informal votes | | 256 | | | 229 | | |
| Total valid votes | | 20,684 | | | 20,711 | | |
| Turnout | | 20,940 | 61.4 | ▲14.8 | | | |
| CDU hold | Majority | 2,914 | 14.1 | ▼3.3 | | | |

=== 2014 election ===
State election (2014): Sonneberg I
| Notes: | Blue background denotes the winner of the electorate vote. Pink background denotes a candidate elected from their party list. Yellow background denotes an electorate win by a list member, or other incumbent. A ✓ or ✗ denotes status of any incumbent, win or lose respectively. | | | | | | |
| Party | Candidate | Votes | % | ±% | Party votes | % | ±% |
|---|---|---|---|---|---|---|---|
| CDU | ✓ Beate Meißner | 7,505 | 48.1 | ▲4.9 | 5,923 | 37.6 | ▲3.0 |
| Left | Knut Korschewsky | 4,787 | 30.7 | ▼3.5 | 4,714 | 29.9 | ▼3.4 |
| AfD | | | | | 1,786 | 11.3 | |
| SPD | David-Christian Eckardt | 2,049 | 13.1 | ▼5.0 | 1,706 | 10.8 | ▼4.6 |
| Greens | Filip Heinlein | 638 | 4.1 | | 562 | 3.6 | ▲0.2 |
| NPD | Frank Neubert | 630 | 4.0 | ▼0.5 | 425 | 2.7 | ▼1.7 |
| List-only parties | | | | | 651 | 4.1 | |
| Informal votes | | 374 | | | 216 | | |
| Total valid votes | | 15,609 | | | 15,767 | | |
| Turnout | | 15,983 | 46.6 | ▼5.8 | | | |
| CDU hold | Majority | 2,718 | 17.4 | ▲8.4 | | | |

=== 2009 election ===
State election (2009): Sonneberg I
| Notes: | Blue background denotes the winner of the electorate vote. Pink background denotes a candidate elected from their party list. Yellow background denotes an electorate win by a list member, or other incumbent. A ✓ or ✗ denotes status of any incumbent, win or lose respectively. | | | | | | |
| Party | Candidate | Votes | % | ±% | Party votes | % | ±% |
|---|---|---|---|---|---|---|---|
| CDU | Beate Meißner | 8,075 | 43.2 | ▼1.9 | 6,525 | 34.6 | ▼8.8 |
| Left | Michael Gerstenberger | 6,378 | 34.2 | ▲7.0 | 6,278 | 33.3 | ▲5.3 |
| SPD | David-Christian Eckardt | 3,380 | 18.1 | ▲2.2 | 2,907 | 15.4 | ▲0.3 |
| NPD | Mike Steiner | 840 | 4.5 | | 831 | 4.4 | ▲3.8 |
| FDP | | | | | 1,119 | 5.9 | ▲2.7 |
| Greens | | | | | 642 | 3.4 | ▲0.6 |
| List-only parties | | | | | 543 | 2.9 | |
| Informal votes | | 466 | | | 294 | | |
| Total valid votes | | 18,673 | | | 18,845 | | |
| Turnout | | 19,139 | 52.4 | ▲2.7 | | | |
| CDU hold | Majority | 1,697 | 9.0 | ▼8.9 | | | |

=== 2004 election ===
State election (2004): Sonneberg I
| Notes: | Blue background denotes the winner of the electorate vote. Pink background denotes a candidate elected from their party list. Yellow background denotes an electorate win by a list member, or other incumbent. A ✓ or ✗ denotes status of any incumbent, win or lose respectively. | | | | | | |
| Party | Candidate | Votes | % | ±% | Party votes | % | ±% |
|---|---|---|---|---|---|---|---|
| CDU | ✓ Christine Zitzmann | 8,099 | 45.1 | ▼5.2 | 7,840 | 43.4 | ▼3.5 |
| PDS | Christoph Schwarze | 4,883 | 27.2 | ▲4.8 | 5,070 | 28.0 | ▲4.0 |
| SPD | David-Christian Eckardt | 2,852 | 15.9 | ▼7.7 | 2,725 | 15.1 | ▼4.4 |
| FDP | Frank Laaser | 1,078 | 6.0 | | 585 | 3.2 | ▲1.8 |
| Independent | Ringo Muggenthaler | 1,059 | 5.9 | | | | |
| List-only parties | | | | | 1,857 | 10.3 | |
| Informal votes | | 945 | | | 839 | | |
| Total valid votes | | 17,971 | | | 18,077 | | |
| Turnout | | 18,916 | 49.7 | ▼7.3 | | | |
| CDU hold | Majority | 3,216 | 17.9 | ▼8.8 | | | |

=== 1999 election ===
State election (1999): Sonneberg I
| Notes: | Blue background denotes the winner of the electorate vote. Pink background denotes a candidate elected from their party list. Yellow background denotes an electorate win by a list member, or other incumbent. A ✓ or ✗ denotes status of any incumbent, win or lose respectively. | | | | | | |
| Party | Candidate | Votes | % | ±% | Party votes | % | ±% |
|---|---|---|---|---|---|---|---|
| CDU | ✓ Christine Zitzmann | 10,745 | 50.3 | ▲13.3 | 10,108 | 46.9 | ▲7.8 |
| SPD | David-Christian Eckardt | 5,051 | 23.6 | ▼11.0 | 4,198 | 19.5 | ▼13.1 |
| PDS | Almuth Beck | 4,777 | 22.4 | ▲3.7 | 5,178 | 24.0 | ▲6.4 |
| REP | Ulf Schmidt | 799 | 3.7 | | 278 | 1.3 | ▼0.5 |
| List-only parties | | | | | 1,779 | 8.3 | |
| Informal votes | | 475 | | | 306 | | |
| Total valid votes | | 21,372 | | | 21,541 | | |
| Turnout | | 21,847 | 57.0 | ▼19.3 | | | |
| CDU hold | Majority | 5,694 | 26.7 | ▲24.3 | | | |

=== 1994 election ===
State election (1994): Sonneberg I
| Notes: | Blue background denotes the winner of the electorate vote. Pink background denotes a candidate elected from their party list. Yellow background denotes an electorate win by a list member, or other incumbent. A ✓ or ✗ denotes status of any incumbent, win or lose respectively. | | | | | | |
| Party | Candidate | Votes | % | ±% | Party votes | % | ±% |
|---|---|---|---|---|---|---|---|
| CDU | Christine Zitzmann | 10,373 | 37.0 | | 11,017 | 39.1 | |
| SPD | | 9,708 | 34.6 | | 9,198 | 32.6 | |
| PDS | | 5,256 | 18.7 | | 4,973 | 17.6 | |
| FDP | | 1,495 | 5.3 | | 1,151 | 4.1 | |
| Greens | | 1,237 | 4.4 | | 985 | 3.5 | |
| List-only parties | | | | | 854 | 3.0 | |
| Informal votes | | 915 | | | 806 | | |
| Total valid votes | | 28,069 | | | 28,178 | | |
| Turnout | | 28,984 | 76.2 | | | | |
| CDU win new seat | Majority | 665 | 2.4 | | | | |
