= Thuringian Highland =

Low mountain range and natural region in Thuringia, Germany

Coordinates: 50°30′N 11°10′E

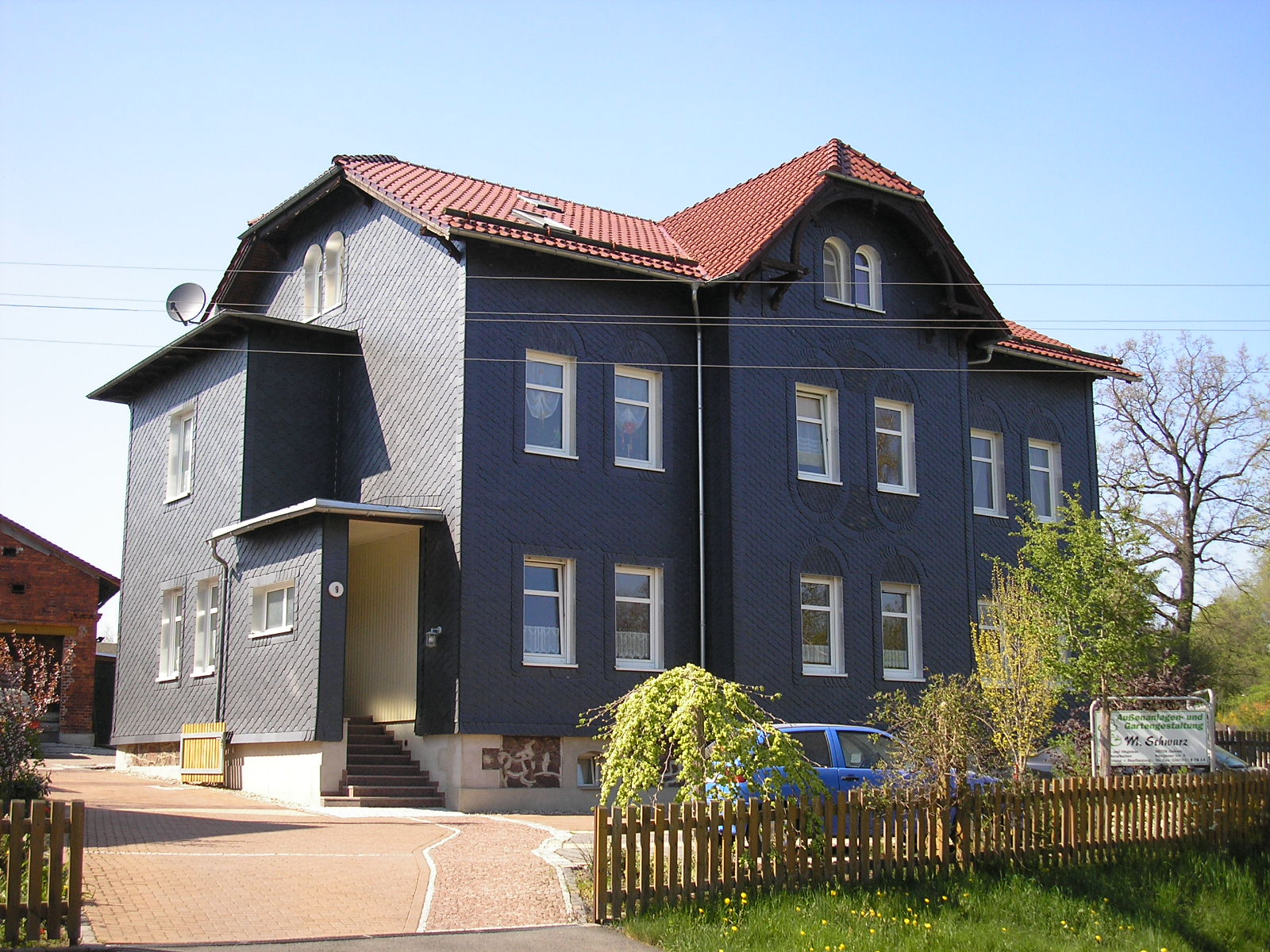
Slate houses like these in Gehren characterise many of the villages in the Thuringian Highland

The Thuringian Highland, Thuringian Highlands or Thuringian-Vogtlandian Slate Mountains (German: Thüringer Schiefergebirge [ˈtyːʁɪŋɐ ˈʃiːfɐɡəˌbɪʁɡə] or Thüringisches Schiefergebirge [ˈtyːʁɪŋɪʃəs -], literally "Thuringian Slate Hills") is a low range of mountains in the German state of Thuringia.

== Geography ==
The Thuringian Highland borders on the Thuringian Forest to the southwest. It is a plateau about 20 km wide that slopes southeast towards the Saale valley in the area of the Saale Dam and includes parts of the Thuringian Forest and Thuringian Highland and Upper Saale Nature Park.

The largest towns in the Thuringian Highland are Saalfeld and Bad Blankenburg which lie on its northern perimeter, Neuhaus am Rennweg in the highest region and Bad Lobenstein on the eastern edge (where it transitions into Franconian Forest).

The area includes a total of 4 smaller regions:

- upper Saale valley
- Plothen Lake District
- High slate mountains
- Sormitz-Schwarza region

The slate mountains of the Vogtland and Thuringian Highland stretch from the Thuringian Forest to the Ore Mountains. They are between about 300 m to 500 m above NN high, and comprise gently rolling hills which are part of the backbone of the Central Uplands. They extend for about 75 km from east to west and 50 km from north to south. Typical features of the landscape are the dolerite peaks or Kuppen (like the Pöhlde or the Hübel) with their wooded crests. These are made from a volcanic rock, dolerite, which is harder than the surrounding rocks and so weathers more slowly, giving rise to the characteristic Kuppen.

== Geology ==
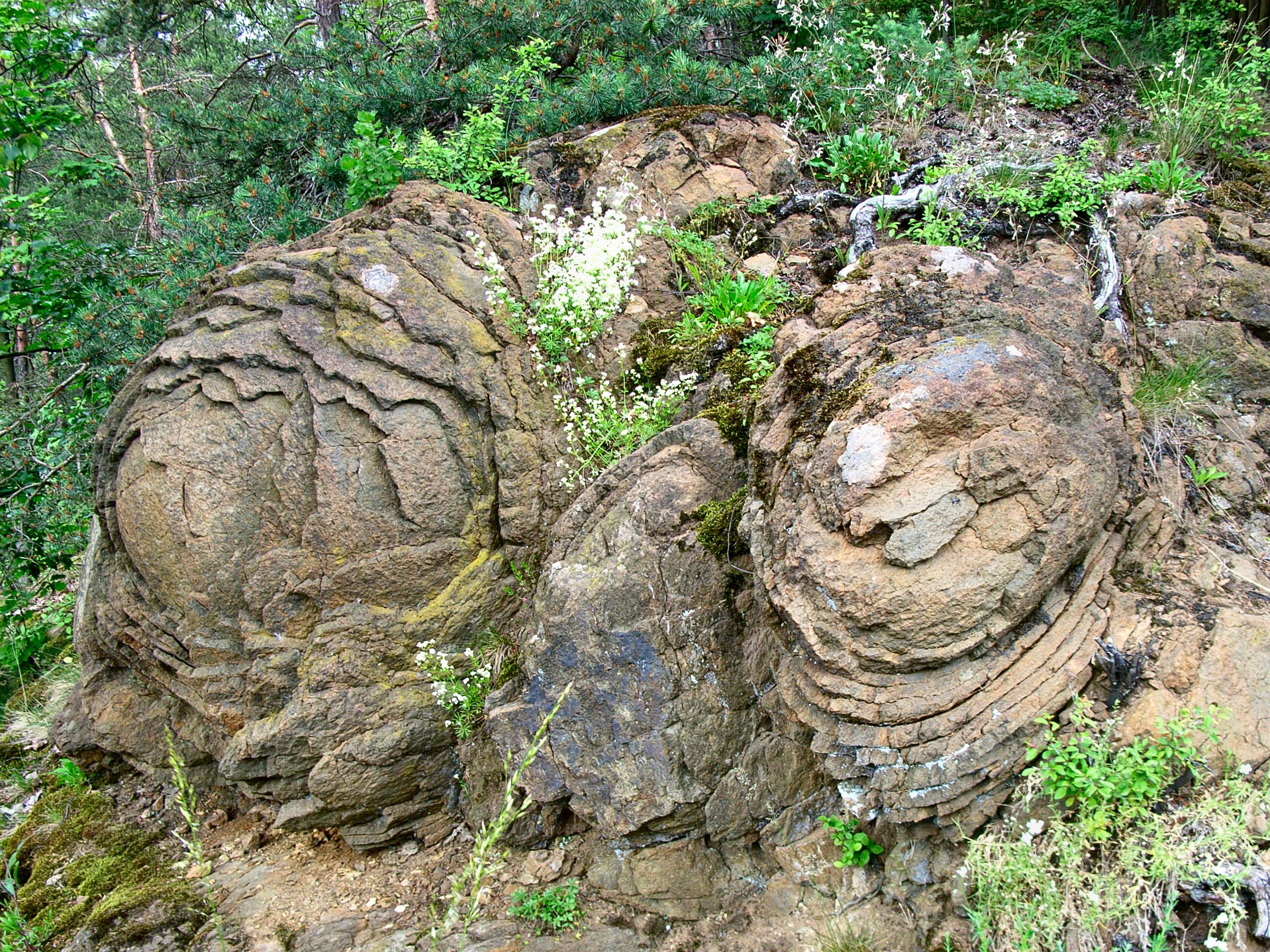
The Steinerne Rose, a diabase rock formation near Saalburg-Ebersdorf

As its German name suggests, the Thuringian Highland is mainly made of slate rock. Although this region was formed in a similar way to the Harz, it lacks the sharp divisions caused by fault lines. Almost all the way round the region transitions gradually into the surrounding land. The rocks found here are from the Palaeozoic era, i.e. the Ordovician, Silurian, Devonian and Lower Carboniferous periods. The most important ones are:

- Shale,
- Alaunschiefer,
- Radiolarite,
- Limestone,
- Sandstone,
- Greywacke,
- Dolerite,
- Spilite
- and volcanic conglomerates.

Karst-forming, and hence cave-forming, limestone only occurs in a few, small, isolated areas. As a result the number of caves is very low.

== Rivers and hydro-electric power ==
In the Saale Valley there are two of the largest dams in Germany, which form the Hohenwarte and Bleiloch Reservoirs. In the Schwarza Valley there is the Goldisthal Pumped Storage Station, opened in 2003, which is one of the largest pumped-storage hydro-electric power stations in Europe.

== Mountains and hills ==
Around the steep-sided valleys of the Schwarza and Saale the height difference between hilltops and valley bottoms is often as much as 300 m or more, which is large for hills of this size.

1. Großer Farmdenkopf (869 m), Sonneberg district
2. Kieferle (867 m), Sonneberg district
3. Bleßberg (865 m), Hildburghausen district
4. Dürre Fichte (861 m), Sonneberg district
5. Breitenberg (Thuringian Forest) (844 m), Sonneberg district
6. Fellberg (842 m), Steinach, Sonneberg district
7. Eselsberg (842 m), Hildburghausen district, Thuringian Forest/Thuringian Highland border
8. Pechleite (839 m), Hildburghausen district
9. Fehrenberg (835 m), Hildburghausen district, Thuringian Forest/Thuringian Highland border
10. Hoher Schuß (827 m), Saalfeld-Rudolstadt district
11. Wurzelberg (820 m), Sonneberg district
12. Jagdschirm (813 m), Saalfeld-Rudolstadt district
13. Hintere Haube (811 m), Ilm district
14. Langer Berg (809 m), Ilm district
15. Hettstädt (808 m), Saalfeld-Rudolstadt district
16. Rauhhügel (802 m), Saalfeld-Rudolstadt district
17. Roter Berg (799 m), Sonneberg district
18. Wetzstein (791 m), Saalfeld-Rudolstadt district
19. Meuselbacher Kuppe (786 m), Saalfeld-Rudolstadt district
20. Fröbelturm (784 m), Saalfeld-Rudolstadt district
21. Grendel (784 m), Hildburghausen district
22. Spitzer Berg (781 m), Saalfeld-Rudolstadt district
23. Simmersberg (781 m), Landkr. Hildburghausen, Thuringian Forest/Thuringian Highland border
24. Himmelsleiter (Berg) (774 m), Saalfeld-Rudolstadt district
25. Töpfersbühl (762 m), Saalfeld-Rudolstadt district
26. Sieglitzberg (733 m), Saale-Orla district
27. Kirchberg (Thuringia) (725,3 m), Saalfeld-Rudolstadt district
28. Rosenberg (Thuringian Highland) (716 m), Saalfeld-Rudolstadt district
29. Großer Mühlberg (714 m), Sonneberg district
30. Quittelsberg (709 m), Saalfeld-Rudolstadt district
31. Bocksberg (696 m), Sonneberg district
32. Auf der Heide (668 m), Saalfeld-Rudolstadt district
33. Beerberg (667 m), Saalfeld-Rudolstadt district
34. Barigauer Höhe (665 m), Saalfeld-Rudolstadt district
35. Zipptanskuppe (657 m), Saalfeld-Rudolstadt district
36. Rosenbühl (653 m), Saale-Orla district
37. Keilsburg (648 m), Saalfeld-Rudolstadt district
38. Eisenberg (636 m), Saalfeld-Rudolstadt district
39. Talberg (602 m), Saalfeld-Rudolstadt district
40. Batzenberg (588 m), Saalfeld-Rudolstadt district
41. Schwarzer Berg (Thuringia) (582 m), Saalfeld-Rudolstadt district
42. Elmischer Berg (529 m), Saalfeld-Rudolstadt district
43. Geiersberg (520 m), Saalfeld-Rudolstadt district
44. Rabenhügel (506 m), Saalfeld-Rudolstadt district
45. Roderberg (502 m), Saalfeld-Rudolstadt district
46. Sommerberg (493 m), Saalfeld-Rudolstadt district
47. Ziegenberg (460 m), Saalfeld-Rudolstadt district

== See also ==
- Thuringian Forest

== Literature ==
- Ernst Kaiser: Thüringerwald und Schiefergebirge, 2nd improved and expanded edn., Gotha, 1955.
- Adolf Hanle (ed.): Thüringerwald und Schiefergebirge, Mannheim etc. 1992. ISBN 3-411-07191-5
