= Gustav August Munzer =

German architect

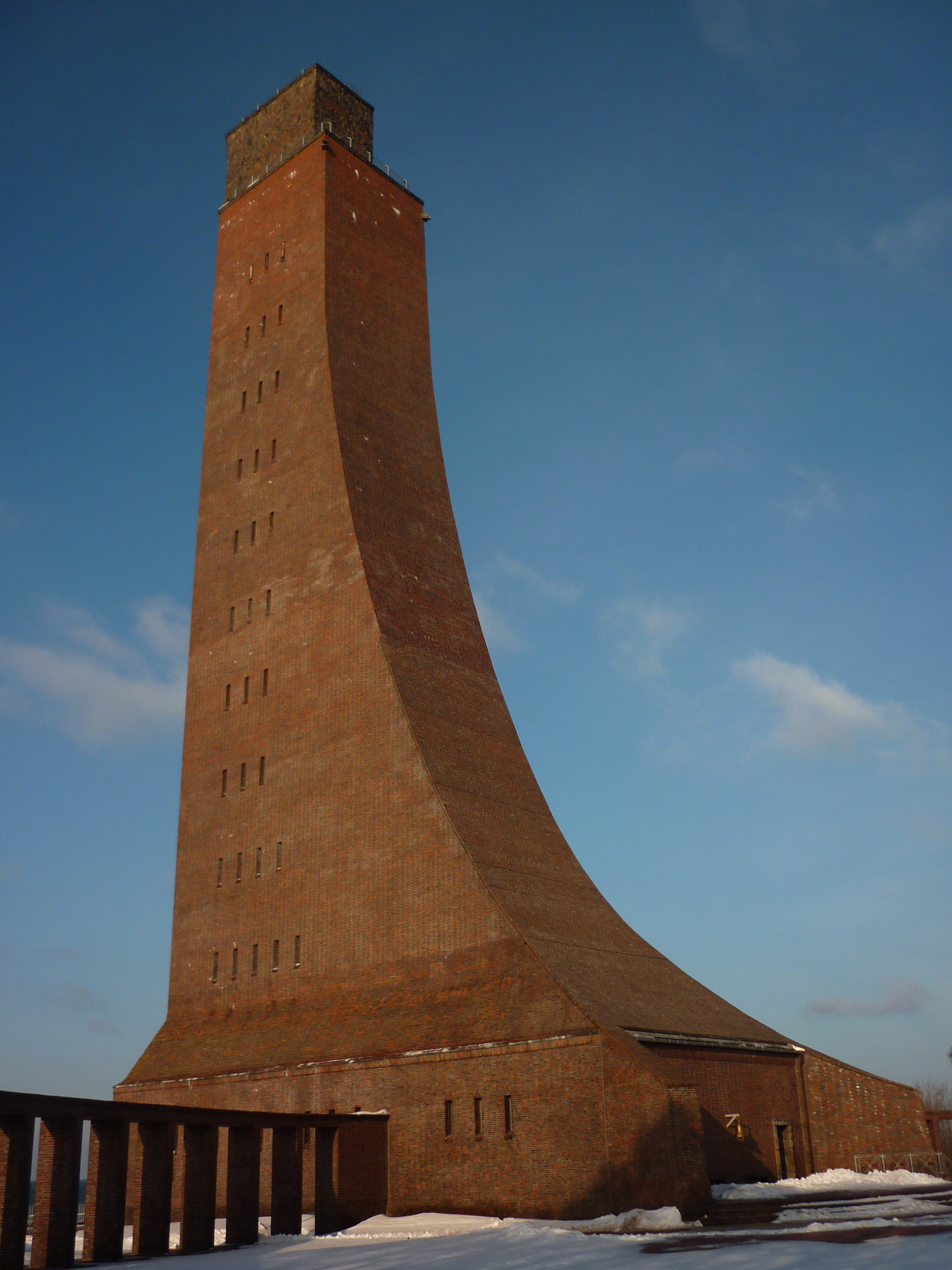
- Born: 9 January 1887 (Föritz-) Oerlsdorf, Saxe-Meiningen, German Empire
- Died: 23 August 1973 (aged 86); Düsseldorf, West Germany
- Occupation: Architect
- Parent(s): Emil Munzer and Berta née Reissenweber
- Buildings: Laboe Naval Memorial

Gustav August Munzer (9 January 1887, Oerlsdorf – 23 August 1973) was a German architect. One of his works was the Laboe Naval Memorial near Kiel.

== Early life ==
Munzer grew up on a farm near Föritz in Saxe-Meiningen (now southern Thuringia). He received his basic education in the small settlement of Mupperg, and later became a bricklayer, working on several construction sites in the area. After becoming a trained stonecutter he visited the Baugewerbeschule in Coburg from 1904 till 1907. He worked for the architect Willrath in Flensburg in 1907 and 1908, and then for the architect Thaysen in Tondern.

In 1910, he started studying at the Kunstgewerbeschule (school of arts and crafts) in Düsseldorf, where Wilhelm Kreis was professor at that time. Having graduated in 1913, Munzer planned several buildings in Düsseldorf, and during the First World War he also did planning for industry buildings. In 1915 he married. In the 1920s he also worked in the Netherlands planning, including shipyards in Rotterdam.

== Laboe Naval Memorial ==
In December 1926, Munzer participated in a contest held by the Bund Deutscher Marineverein for the design of the Laboe Naval Memorial near Kiel. He was declared the winner of the contest on 15 May 1927 although his design concept, a 72-meter-tall (236 ft) tower, was considered too expensive. The cornerstone for the memorial was laid on 8 August 1927, but it took until 1929 for the formal starting of the tower's construction. The tower was finished in the summer of 1930, and then the construction of the memorial was stopped for three years. Following the completion of the memorial, the opening ceremony was held on 30 May 1936. Apart from the opening ceremony, no official Nazi events were held at the site.

The monument was confiscated by the British Army after World War II. In 1954, it was transferred back to the Bund Deutscher Marineverein, and Munzer was responsible for its restoration and modification. In addition, he was also continuing his work as an architect until 1970. Munzer died in Düsseldorf on 23 August 1973.
