= Gießübel =

Gießübel is the name of a number of places in Germany.

- Gießübel (Schleusegrund), a village in the municipality of Schleusegrund, in the district of Hildburghausen, Thuringia (postcode 98667).
- Gießübel (Geisenfeld), a village in the municipality of Geisenfeld, in the district of Pfaffenhofen an der Ilm, Bavaria (postcode 85290)
- Giessübel (Kronach), a village in the municipality of Kronach, Bavaria (postcode 96317)
- Gießübel (Marktl), a hamlet in the municipality of Marktl, in the district of Altötting, Bavaria (postcode 84533)
- Gießübel (Neuötting), a hamlet in the municipality of Neuötting, in the district of Altötting, Bavaria (postcode 84524)
- Gießübel, one of the burial areas at the Iron Age Celtic hillfort of Heuneburg, Baden Württemberg (postcode 88518)

Gießübel is also a German surname.
