= Judenbach =

- Ortsteil of Föritztal
- Interactive map of Judenbach
- Location within Germany Location within Thuringia
- Coordinates: 50°24′N 11°13′E
- Country: Germany
- State: Thuringia
- District: Sonneberg
- Municipality: Föritztal

Area
  - Total: 43.18 km^{2} (16.67 sq mi)
- Elevation: 630 m (2,070 ft)

Population (2016-12-31)
  - Total: 2,349
  - Density: 54.40/km^{2} (140.9/sq mi)
- Time zone: UTC+01:00 (CET)
  - Summer (DST): UTC+02:00 (CEST)
- Postal codes: 96524
- Dialling codes: 03675

Judenbach (German pronunciation: [ˈjuːdn̩bax]) is a village and a former municipality in the Sonneberg district of Thuringia, Germany. It was merged into the new municipality Föritztal together with Föritz and Neuhaus-Schierschnitz on 6 July 2018.

== Geography ==
=== Neighboring municipalities ===
- Tettau
- Pressig
- Sonneberg

=== Subdivisions ===
Judenbach included the following subdivisions:

- Heinersdorf
- Jagdshof
- Mönchsberg
- Neuenbau
