= Kieferle =

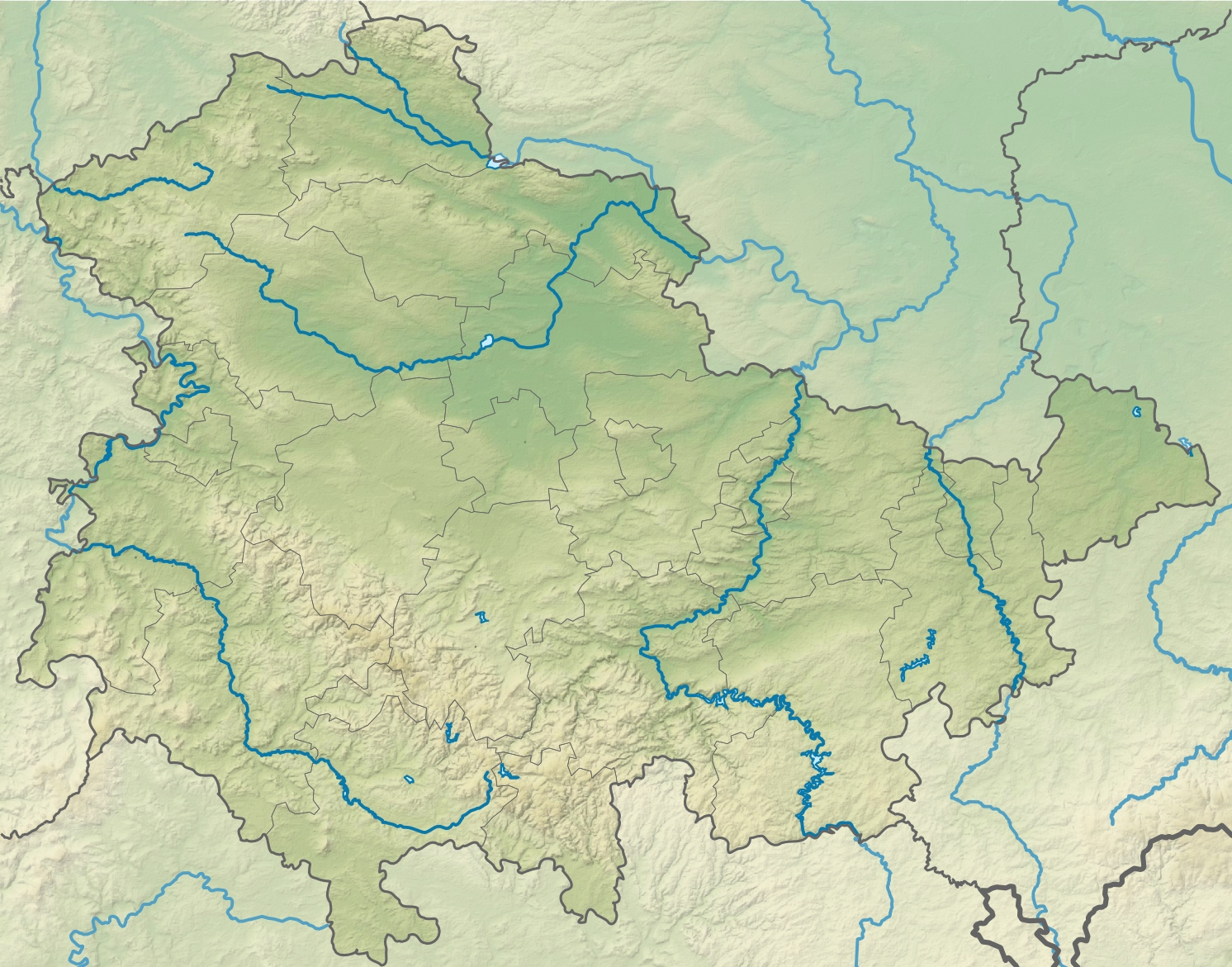
- Location within Thuringia

Highest point
- Elevation: 867.2 m above sea level (NHN) (2,845 ft)
- Isolation: 5.9 km → Großer Farmdenkopf
- Coordinates: 50°28′09″N 11°05′33″E

Geography
- Location: Thuringian Highland

The Kieferle, near Steinheid in the county of Sonneberg, is a mountain, 867.2 m above sea level (NHN), in the Thuringian Highland and the second highest mountain of this range, which forms the eastern part of the Thuringian Forest.

To the west-southwest the valley of the Grümpen, whose eastern source lies on the mountain's western slopes, clearly separates it from the almost equally high Dürre Fichte, on whose northern and eastern mountainsides other sources are located. To the east it is bounded by the Göritz. To the north of the mountain rises the Schwarza. To the south is the 837-metre-high Rittersberg, whose eastern neighbour is the Breitenberg.

The waters of the Grümpen discharge into the River Main and then finally into the Rhine, but those of the Schwarza enter the Saale which flows into the Elbe. The mountain is thus on the watershed between the Rhine and the Elbe. The Kieferle rises south of the long-distance trail, the Rennsteig, which runs over the nearby Sandberg. The Kieferle descends to the south and is part of the Southern Heights of the Slate Mountains (Südlichen Hohen Schiefergebirge).

== See also ==
List of mountains and hills in Thuringia
