= Neuhaus-Schierschnitz =

- Ortsteil of Föritztal
- Coat of arms
- Interactive map of Neuhaus-Schierschnitz
- Location within Germany Location within Thuringia
- Coordinates: 50°19′N 11°15′E
- Country: Germany
- State: Thuringia
- District: Sonneberg
- Municipality: Föritztal

Area
  - Total: 23.2 km^{2} (9.0 sq mi)
- Elevation: 350 m (1,150 ft)

Population (2016-12-31)
  - Total: 3,103
  - Density: 134/km^{2} (346/sq mi)
- Time zone: UTC+01:00 (CET)
  - Summer (DST): UTC+02:00 (CEST)
- Postal codes: 96524
- Dialling codes: 036764

Neuhaus-Schierschnitz (German pronunciation: [ˈnɔʏhaʊs ˈʃiːɐ̯ʃnɪts]) is a former municipality in the Sonneberg district of Thuringia, Germany. It was merged into the new municipality Föritztal together with Föritz and Judenbach on 6 July 2018.
