= Scheibe-Alsbach =

- Ortsteil of Neuhaus am Rennweg
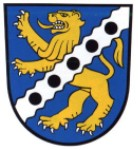
- Coat of arms
- Interactive map of Scheibe-Alsbach
- Location within Germany Location within Thuringia
- Coordinates: 50°30′N 11°4′E
- Country: Germany
- State: Thuringia
- District: Sonneberg
- Town: Neuhaus am Rennweg

Area
  - Total: 19.74 km^{2} (7.62 sq mi)
- Elevation: 610 m (2,000 ft)

Population (31 January 2013)
  - Total: 567
  - Density: 28.7/km^{2} (74.4/sq mi)
- Time zone: UTC+01:00 (CET)
  - Summer (DST): UTC+02:00 (CEST)
- Postal codes: 98749
- Dialling codes: 036704
- Vehicle registration: SON
- Website: www.scheibe-alsbach.de

Scheibe-Alsbach (German pronunciation: [ˈʃaɪbə ˈʔalsbax]) is a former municipality in the Sonneberg district of Thuringia, Germany. Since 31 December 2012, it is part of the town Neuhaus am Rennweg.
