= Laboe Naval Memorial =

Museum in Germany

Coordinates: 54°24′43.87″N 10°13′50.87″E

- Germany
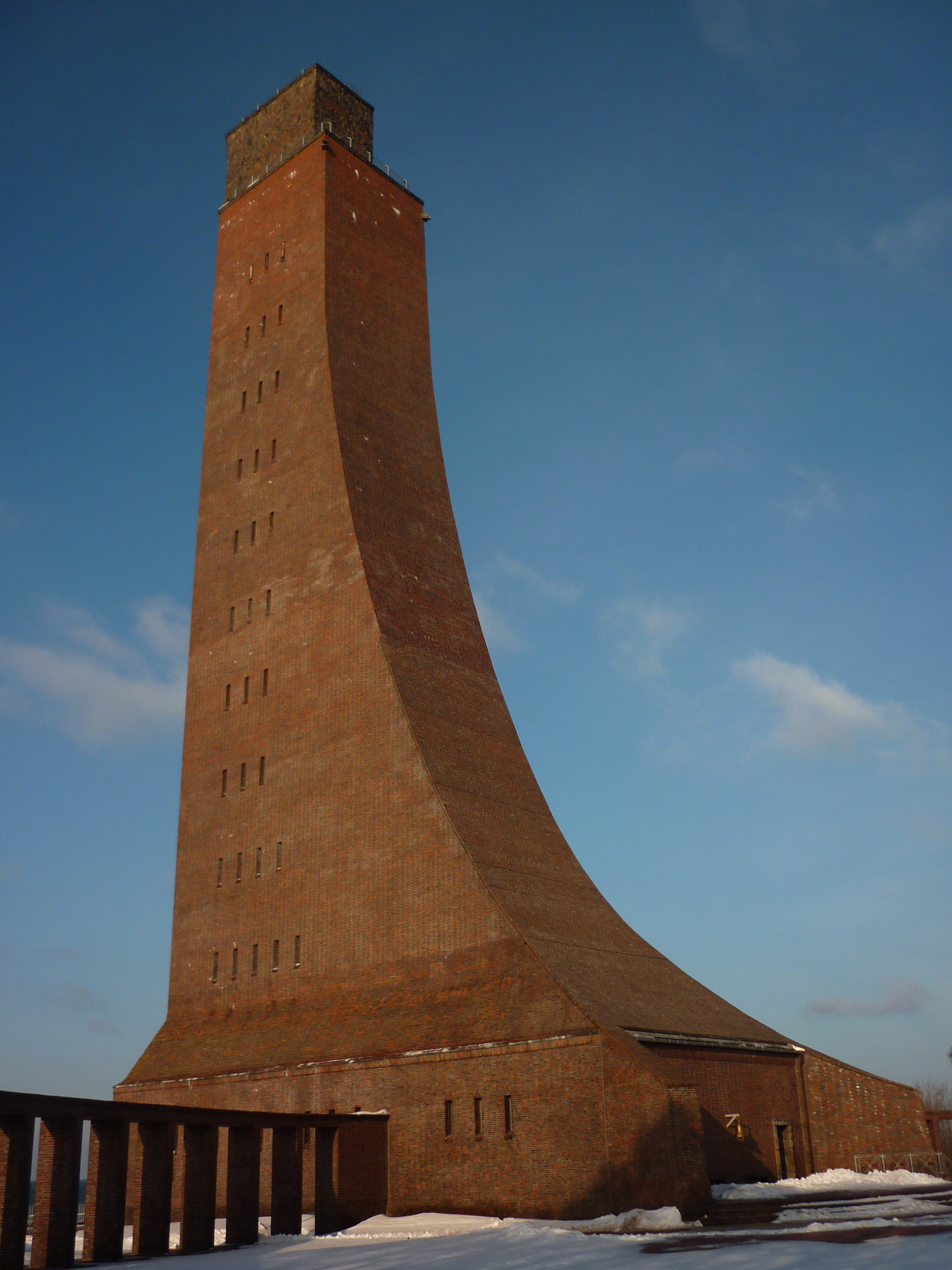
- For the sailors of all nationalities who were lost at sea
- Unveiled: 1936
- Location: near Laboe, Germany

The Laboe Naval Memorial (a.k.a. Laboe Tower, German: Marine-Ehrenmal Laboe) is a memorial located in Laboe, northeast of Kiel in eastern Schleswig-Holstein, Germany. Started in 1927 and completed in 1936 as a war memorial, the monument originally commemorated the war dead of Germany's World War I navy, the Kaiserliche Marine; with the Kriegsmarine dead of World War II being added after 1945. In 1954 it was rededicated as a memorial for the sailors of all nationalities who were lost at sea and at the same time a memorial for peaceful sailing in open seas.

The monument consists of a 72-metre-high (236 ft) tower topped by an observation deck. The deck stands a total 85 m (279 ft) above sea level. A hall of remembrance and World War II-era German submarine U-995, which houses a technical museum, both sit near the foot of the monument, and the site is a popular tourist venue. U-995 is the world's only remaining Type VII U-boat.

The tower was designed by architect Gustav August Munzer, who stated that the form was not meant to represent anything specific but was to inspire positive feelings in those who look at it. It has been associated by guides with the stem of a Viking longship or the conning tower of a submarine.

The memorial complex was taken over by Britain’s Royal Navy at the end of the war in 1945, which expelled the Deutscher Marinebund (German Navy Federation), the organisation responsible for its preservation. In 1954, the Allies returned it to the new Deutscher Marinebund, with the obligation to extend the memorial to the victims of the German navy in the two world wars, as well as to its enemies. In 1996, it was decided to extend the commemoration to all sailors in general, and to evoke the freedom of the seas.

The tower is 72 m (236 ft) high, 31.5 m (103 ft) long and 13.8 m (45 ft) wide; its location is 13 m (43 ft) above sea level, overlooking Kiel Fjord and the Baltic Sea.

The German Navy has a memorial inscribed on the left-hand side for its sailors who “have lost their lives since 1955 in the performance of their duty”, and a similar memorial for civilian victims of disasters at sea, inscribed on the right.

== Gallery ==
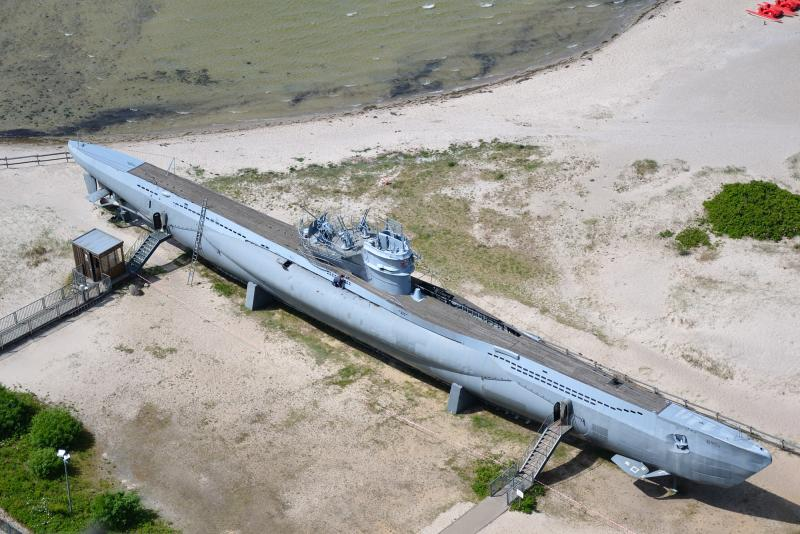
U-995, photographed from top of the tower

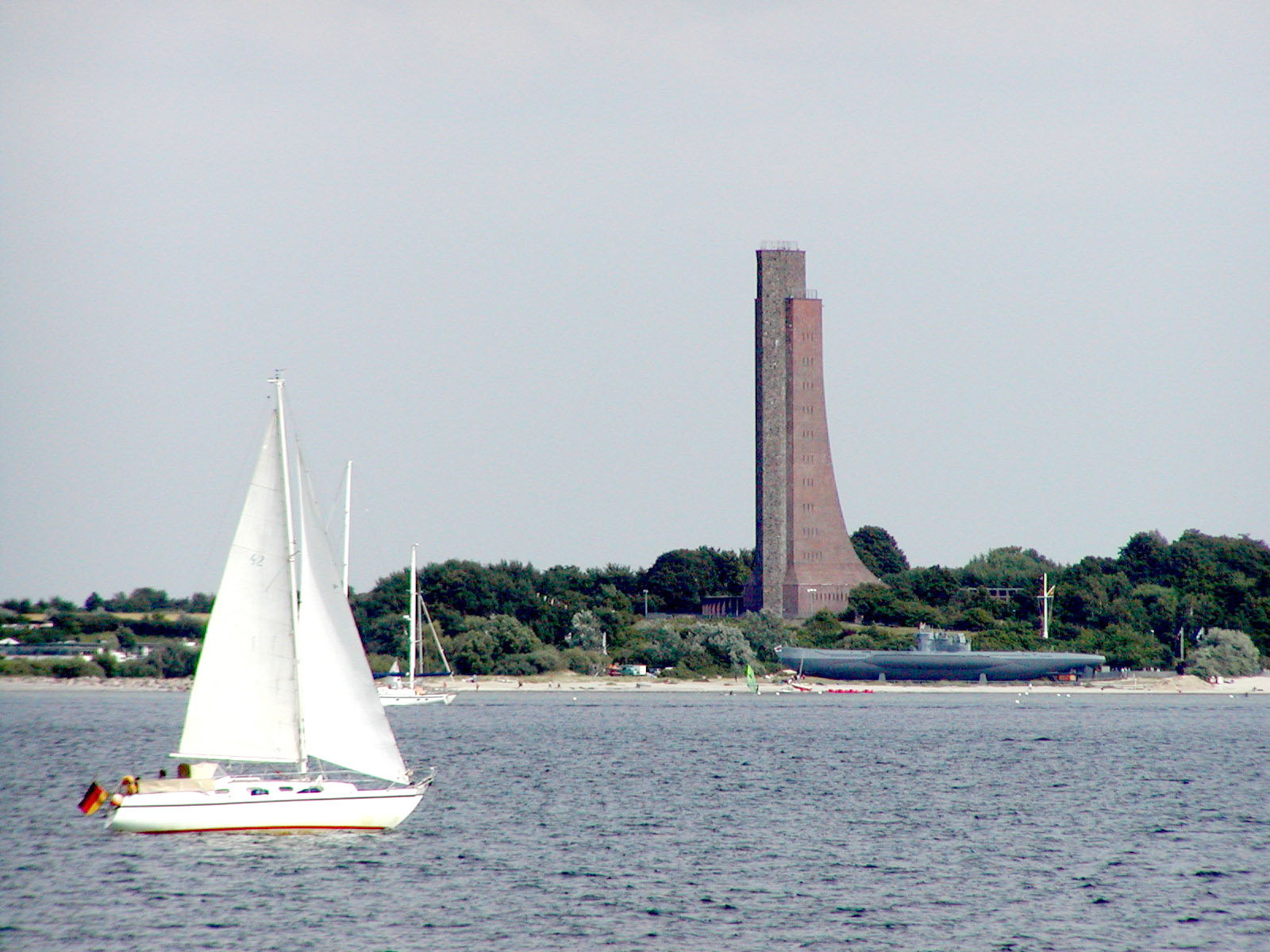
Laboe Tower seen from water with submarine museum U-995 at beach

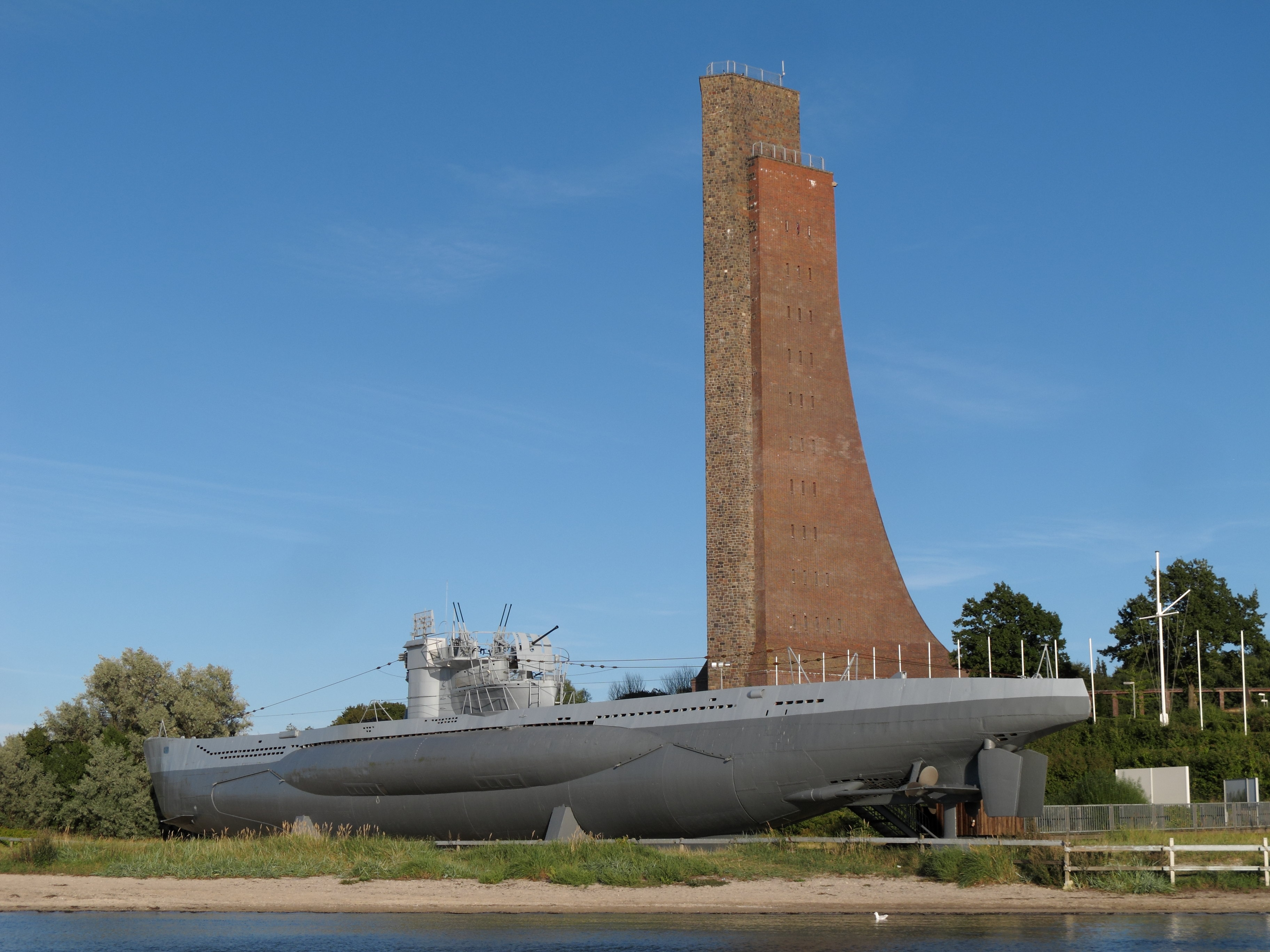
Laboe Memorial and submarine museum U-995.

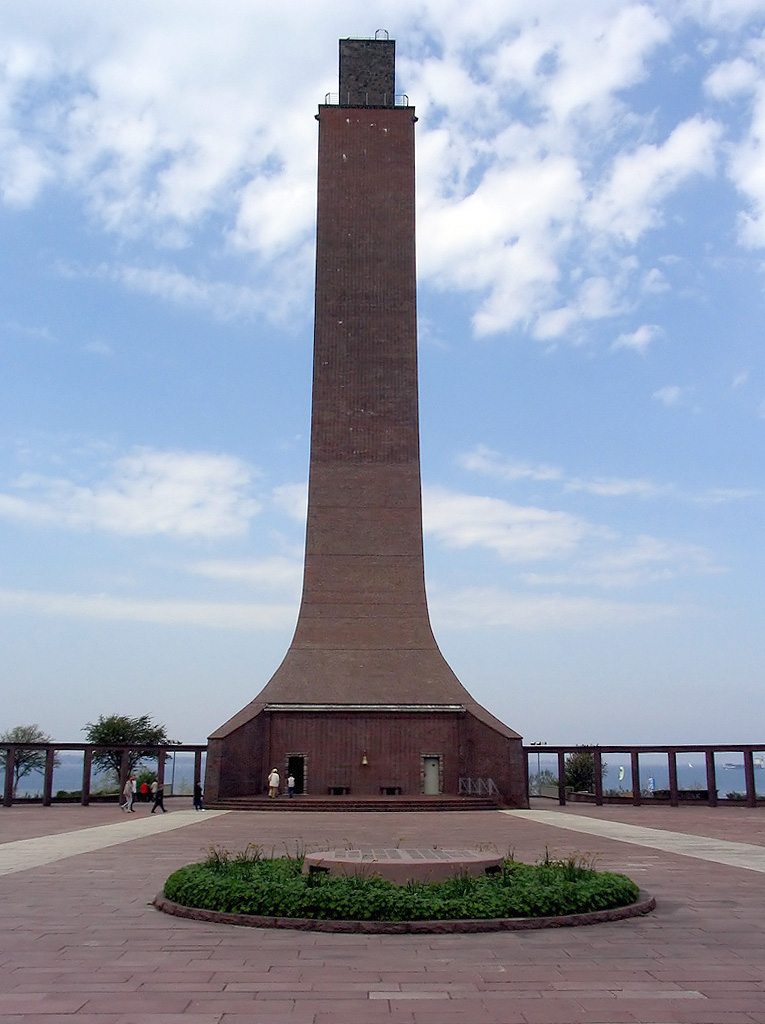
View of rear of the tower and Memorial Square

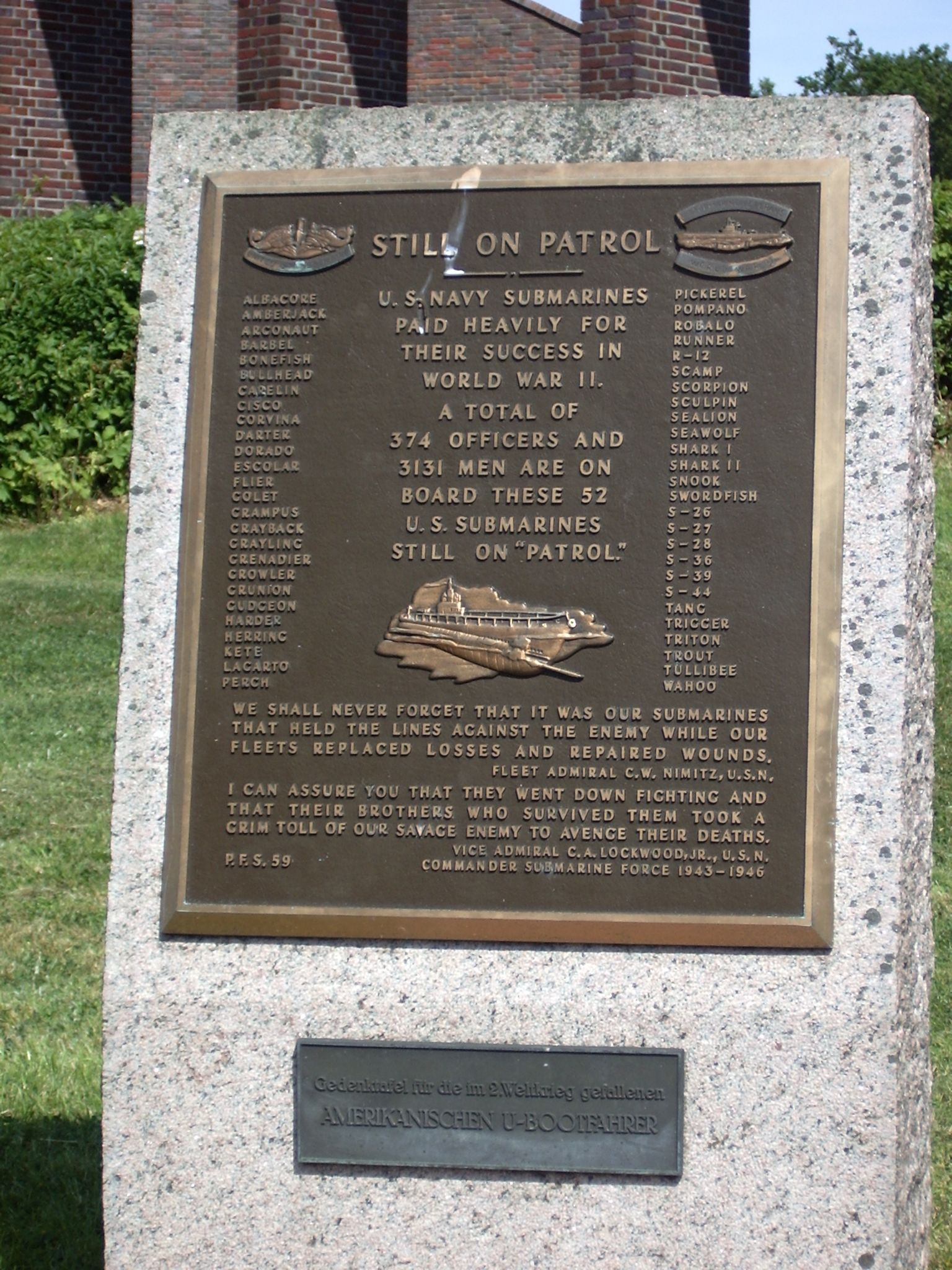
Plaque memorializing fallen U.S. submariners.

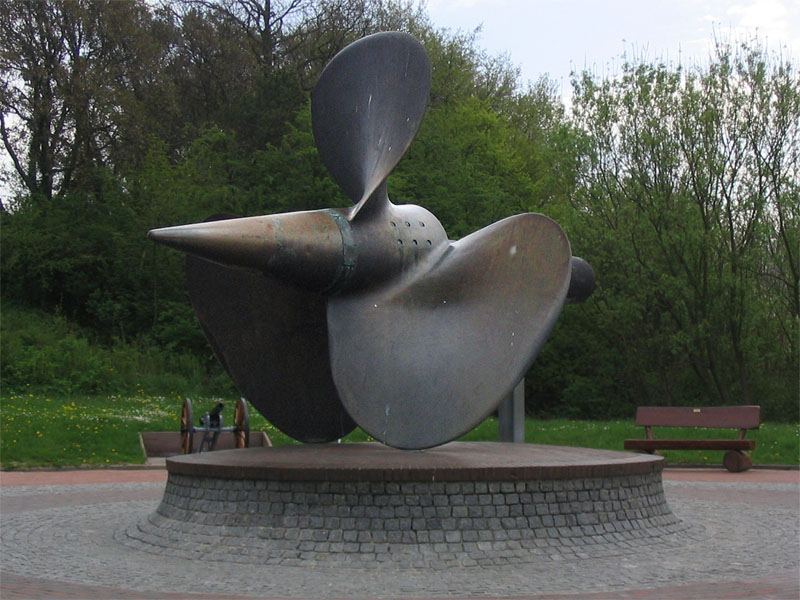
Propeller of heavy cruiser Prinz Eugen
