= Biber (Schleuse) =

Location
- Country: Germany
- State: Thuringia

Physical characteristics
- Mouth
  - location: Schleuse
  - coordinates: 50.5037°N 10.8428°E

Basin features
- Progression: Schleuse→ Werra→ Weser→ North Sea

Biber (German pronunciation: [ˈbiːbɐ]) is a river in Thuringia, Germany, that flows into the Schleuse in Lichtenau.

== See also ==
- List of rivers of Thuringia
