= Föritz =

Village in Thuringia, Germany

- Ortsteil of Föritztal
- Coat of arms
- Interactive map of Föritz
- Location within Germany Location within Thuringia
- Coordinates: 50°21′N 11°13′E
- Country: Germany
- State: Thuringia
- District: Sonneberg
- Municipality: Föritztal

Area
  - Total: 32.12 km^{2} (12.40 sq mi)
- Elevation: 410 m (1,350 ft)

Population (2016-12-31)
  - Total: 3,404
  - Density: 106.0/km^{2} (274.5/sq mi)
- Time zone: UTC+01:00 (CET)
  - Summer (DST): UTC+02:00 (CEST)
- Postal codes: 96524
- Dialling codes: 036764

Föritz (German pronunciation: [ˈføːʁɪts]) is a village and a former municipality on the small Föritz river, which flows into the Steinach) in the Sonneberg district of Thuringia, Germany. It was merged into the new municipality Föritztal together with Judenbach and Neuhaus-Schierschnitz on 6 July 2018.
