= Beate Meißner =

German politician

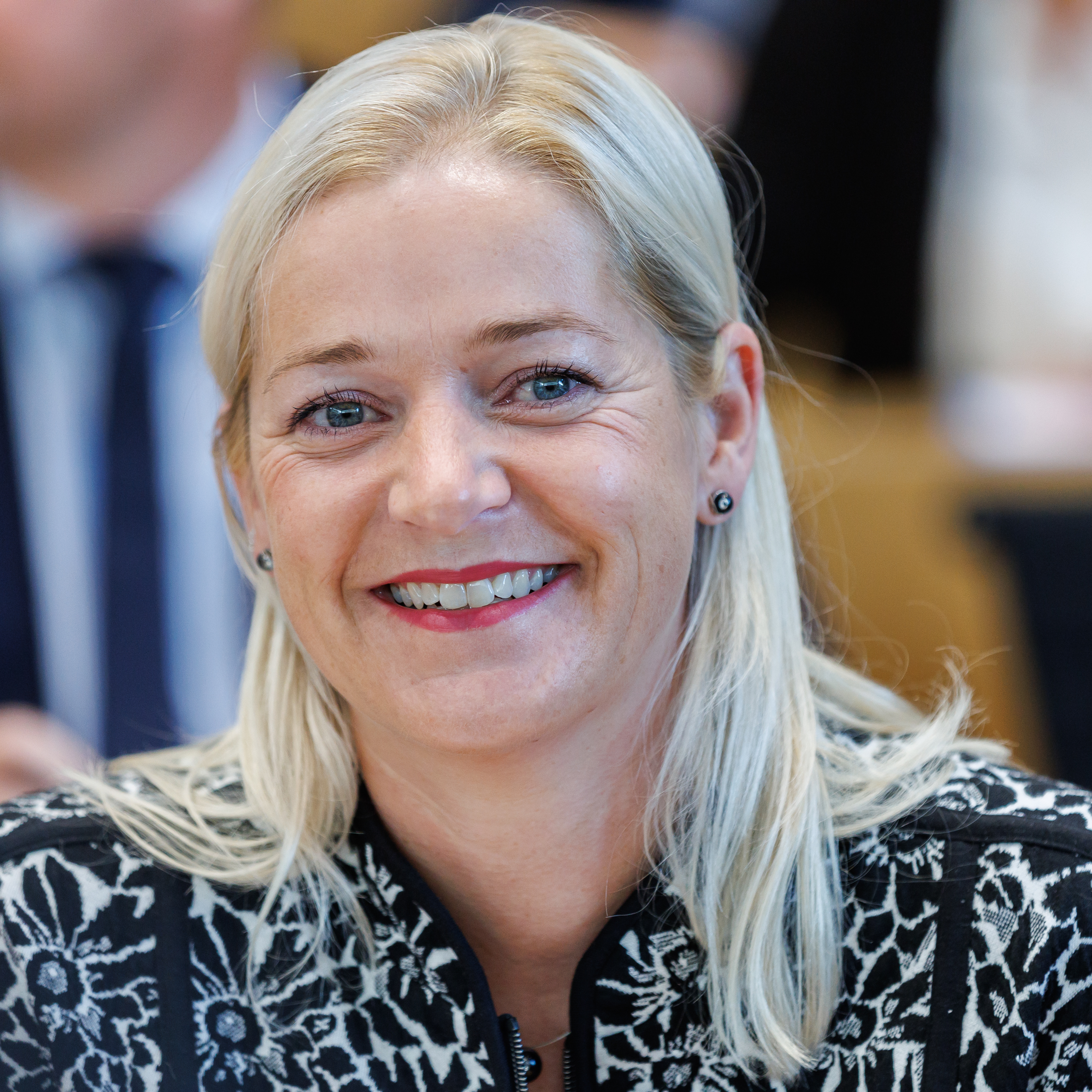
- Meißner in 2024

Minister for Justice, Migration and Consumer Protection of Brandenburg
- Incumbent
- Assumed office 13 December 2024

Member of the Landtag of Brandenburg
- Incumbent
- Assumed office 1 July 2006

Personal details
- Born: 2 April 1982 (age 44) Marienberg, Bezirk Karl-Marx-Stadt, Germany (then East Germany)
- Party: CDU
- Education: University of Jena

Beate Meißner (born 2 April 1982) is a German politician from the Christian Democratic Union of Germany. She has been a member of the Landtag of Thuringia since 2006. She has been Thuringian Minister for Justice, Migration and Consumer Protection since 2024.

== Educational and professional career ==
Meißner attended primary school in Artern from 1988 to 1992, then moved on to high school and graduated from the state-recognized Klosterschule Roßleben in 2000. She then began studying law at the Friedrich Schiller University of Jena, which she completed in 2005 with the first state law examination. In addition, she completed a certificate course in political science with a master's degree from 2001 to 2005. By 2011, she had completed her legal preparatory service (referendariat) in the district of the Erfurt Regional Court, passing the second state law examination.

== Political career ==
Meißner joined the Young Union in 1998 and was chairwoman of the JU Kyffhäuserkreis from 2001 to 2004. In 2003 she joined the CDU. In September 2012 she was elected as an assessor on the state executive board of the CDU Thuringia. From June 2013 to November 2015 Meißner was chairwoman of the CDU district association Sonneberg. She has held this office again since March 2022. In September 2020 she was elected deputy state chairwoman of the CDU Thuringia and deputy chairwoman of the CDU state executive board.

In Sonneberg, Meißner has been a member of the city council since the 2009 Thuringia local elections. Since 2019, she has also been an honorary councilor for the city of Sonneberg and second deputy mayor.

On 1 July 2006, she replaced the retiring member Christine Zitzmann in the Landtag of Thuringia. In the following two years, she was a member of the Education Committee until May 2008, and since May 2008 a member of the Committee on Justice, Federal and European Affairs and the Committee on Social Affairs, Family and Health.

In the 2009 Thuringian state election, she stood for the first time as a direct candidate for the CDU in the Sonneberg I constituency and won with 43.2 percent of the first votes against Michael Gerstenberger of the Left Party. In the Landtag of Thuringia, she was chairwoman of the Committee for Social Affairs, Family and Health from 2009 and deputy chairwoman of the Justice and Constitutional Affairs Committee. From February 2012, she was also a member of the Thuringian state parliament's "Right-wing terrorism and the actions of the authorities" investigation committee.

After her successful re-election with 48.1 percent in the 2014 Thuringian state election, Meißner was a member of the Committee for Social Affairs, Labor and Health as well as the Committee for Migration, Justice and Consumer Protection and, from January 2015, social policy spokeswoman for the CDU parliamentary group.

In the 2019 Thuringian state election, she again won the direct mandate in her constituency with 41.5 percent, clearly ahead of the candidate from the Left Party. In the 7th legislative period, she was a member of the Committee for Social Affairs, Labor, Health, Family and Women, the Committee for Migration, Justice and Consumer Protection, and the Election Review Committee. Meißner was also the spokesperson for the CDU parliamentary group on the issues of family, senior citizens, and the disabled, as well as responsible for the area of equal opportunities.

In the 2024 Thuringian state election, Meißner was re-elected to the Landtag via the state list.

On 13 December 2024, Meißner was appointed Thuringian Minister for Justice, Migration and Consumer Protection in the Voigt cabinet.

== Volunteer work ==
Meißner sits on the board of trustees of the State Centre for Political Education of Thuringia and on the board of trustees of the Thuringian Volunteer Foundation. She has also been chairwoman of the Sonneberg District Sports Youth since August 2009. She is a member of the Roßleben Monastery School's Friends' Association, the Friends' Association of the Sonneberg State Vocational School, the Sonneberg Handball Club and the Schaumburg Association Schalkau e. V.

== Personal life ==
Meißner is widowed and lives with her daughter in Sonneberg.
