= Hettstädt =

Mountain in Germany

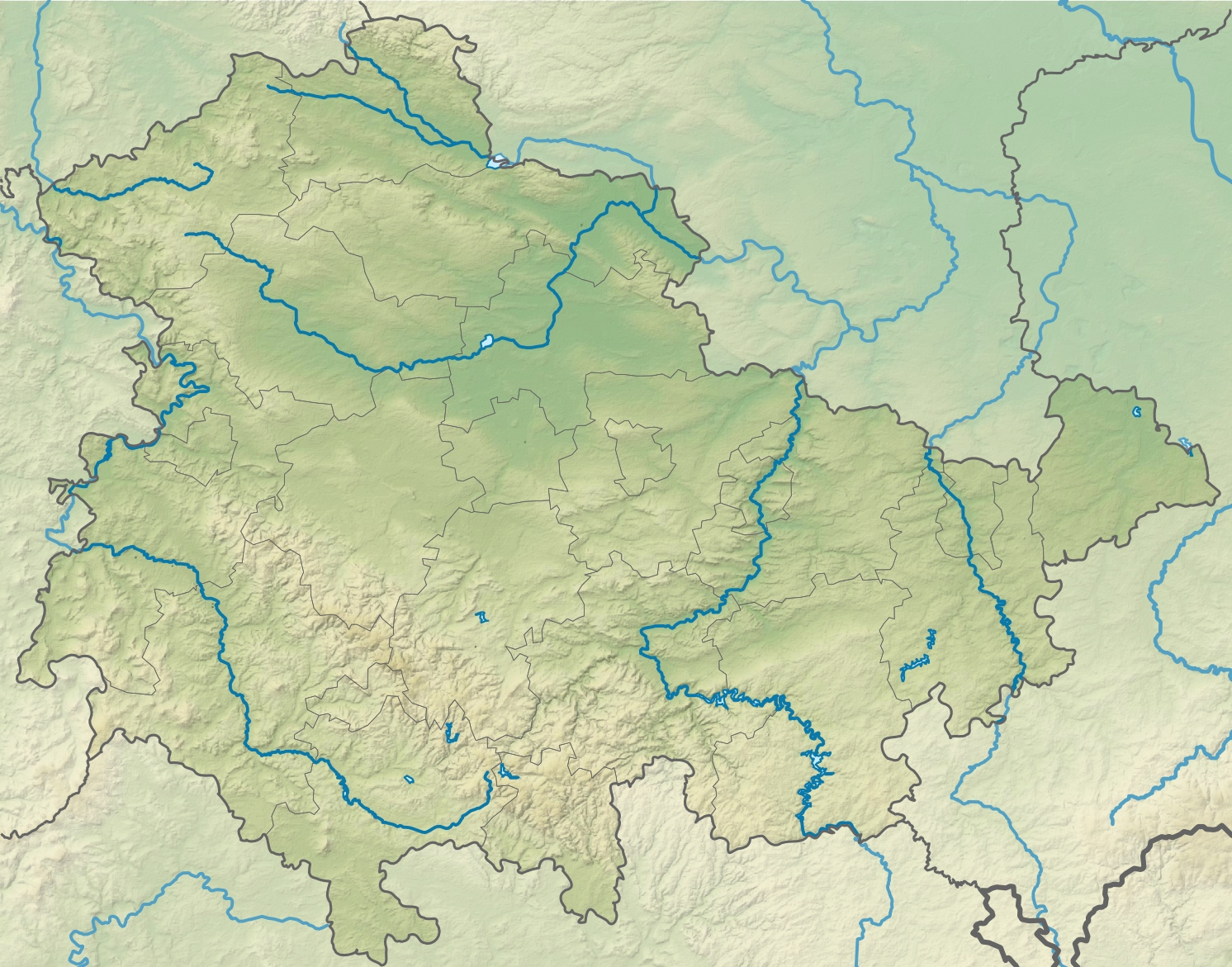
- Location within Thuringia

Highest point
- Elevation: 808.1 m above sea level (NN) (2,651 ft)
- Coordinates: 50°33′10″N 11°08′16″E

Geography
- Location: Saalfeld-Rudolstadt, Thuringia, Germany
- Parent range: Thuringian Highland

The Hettstädt is a mountain between Oberweißbach/Thür. Wald and Neuhaus am Rennweg. At 808 metres, it is one of the highest mountains in the Thuringian Highland. It is best accessed from the road between Cursdorf and Neuhaus am Rennweg.

Its southern foothills, the Selig (730 m), Steinbiel (745 m) and Fischbachsberg (721 m) form the transition from the mountain railway region of Raanz to the actual Northern High Slate Mountains (Nördlichen Hohen Schiefergebirge). In the immediate vicinity is the Eisenach–Budapest European long-distance trail.

== See also ==
- List of mountains and hills of Thuringia
