= Föritztal =

- Municipality
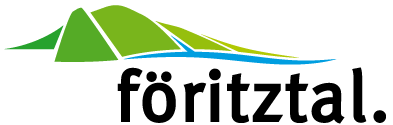
- Logo of the municipality

- Coat of arms

- Location of Föritztal within Sonneberg district
- Interactive map of Föritztal
- Location within Germany Location within Thuringia
- Coordinates: 50°21′0″N 11°14′30″E
- Country: Germany
- State: Thuringia
- District: Sonneberg

Government
  - Mayor (2024–): Silke Fischer (CDU)

Area
  - Total: 98.5 km^{2} (38.0 sq mi)
- Elevation: 630 m (2,070 ft)

Population (2025-12-31)
  - Total: 8,183
  - Density: 83.1/km^{2} (215/sq mi)
- Time zone: UTC+01:00 (CET)
  - Summer (DST): UTC+02:00 (CEST)
- Postal codes: 96524
- Dialling codes: 03675, 036764, 036761
- Vehicle registration: SON, NH
- Website: foeritztal.de

Föritztal (German pronunciation: [ˈføːʁɪtsˌtaːl], lit. 'Föritz Valley') is a municipality in the Sonneberg district of Thuringia, Germany. It was formed on 6 July 2018 by the merger of the former municipalities Föritz, Judenbach and Neuhaus-Schierschnitz. It takes its name from the small river Föritz, a tributary of the Steinach.

== Subdivisions ==
The municipality Föritztal consists of the following villages:

- Eichitz
- Föritz
- Gefell
- Heinersdorf
- Heubisch
- Jagdshof
- Judenbach
- Lindenberg
- Mogger
- Mönchsberg
- Mupperg
- Neuenbau
- Neuhaus-Schierschnitz (consisting of Buch, Gessendorf, Mark, Neuhaus and Schierschnitz)
- Oerlsdorf
- Rotheul
- Rottmar
- Schwärzdorf
- Sichelreuth
- Weidhausen
