= Robert Sesselmann =

German politician (born 1973)

Landrat of Sonneberg
- Incumbent
- Assumed office 3 July 2023
- Preceded by: Jürgen Köpper

Member of the Landtag of Thuringia
- In office 26 November 2019 – 7 July 2023
- Succeeded by: Jens Dietrich

Personal details
- Born: 20 January 1973 (age 53) Sonneberg
- Party: Alternative for Germany (since 2016)

Robert Sesselmann (born 20 January 1973 in Sonneberg) is a German politician serving as Landrat of Sonneberg since 2023. From 2019 to 2023, he was a member of the Landtag of Thuringia.
