= Gießübel (Schleusegrund) =

- Ortsteil of Schleusegrund
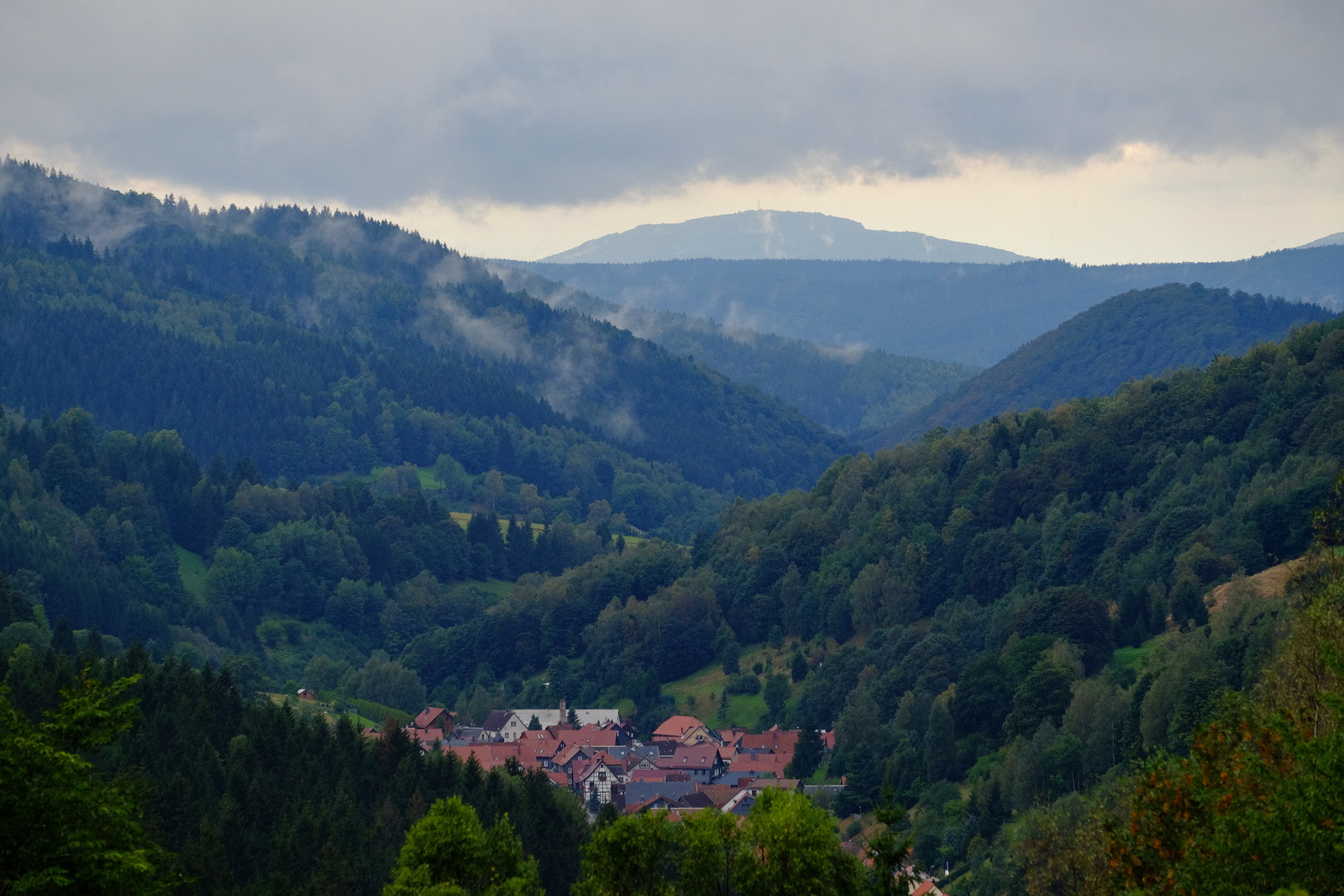
- Gießübel from above

- Coat of arms

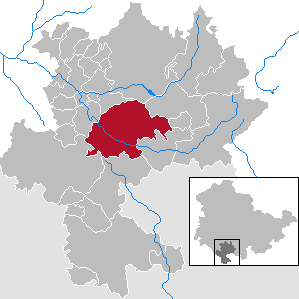
- Location of Gießübel within Hildburghausen district
- Interactive map of Gießübel
- Location within Germany Location within Thuringia
- Coordinates: 50°32′N 10°55′E
- Country: Germany
- State: Thuringia
- District: Hildburghausen
- Municipality: Schleusegrund
- Elevation: 530 m (1,740 ft)
- Time zone: UTC+01:00 (CET)
  - Summer (DST): UTC+02:00 (CEST)
- Postal codes: 98667
- Dialling codes: 036874
- Vehicle registration: HBN

Gießübel is a village in the municipality of Schleusegrund, in the district of Hildburghausen, Thuringia, and is a state-recognized health resort).

== History ==
Gießübel was first mentioned in a document around 1317 and probably dates back to an early iron foundry. The village belonged to the Eisfeld district and was historically characterised by forestry and timber processing. Sulphur gravel was also mined in the 17th century. Other economic activities included linen weaving, yeast trading and two grinding mills. In 1666 there were 175 inhabitants, by 1852 there were already 787. Industrialisation had a particular impact on the local wood processing industry, with the mills becoming sawmills with associated timber production. In 1636, Gießübel established its own school, which paved the way for eight other schools in the area. The new school was built and completed in 1900. A glassworks was also operated after 1918.

There was little tourism before the Second World War, but this began to expand during the communist era. The local cultural centre (opened in 1956) was the first cultural centre in the Upper Forest region. There were also smiths, wainwrights, turners, wheelwrights, charcoal burners, blacksmiths, locksmiths, nail smiths, carpenters, joiners and miners. Woodworking and glass production continued and an electrical company was opened.

On 25 March 1994, Gießübel merged with three surrounding communities to form the new municipality of Schleusegrund.
