= Goldisthal =

- Municipality
- Coat of arms

- Location of Goldisthal within Sonneberg district
- Interactive map of Goldisthal
- Location within Germany Location within Thuringia
- Coordinates: 50°31′N 11°0′E
- Country: Germany
- State: Thuringia
- District: Sonneberg

Government
  - Mayor (2022–28): Kay Machold

Area
  - Total: 19.69 km^{2} (7.60 sq mi)
- Elevation: 512 m (1,680 ft)

Population (2025-12-31)
  - Total: 336
  - Density: 17.1/km^{2} (44.2/sq mi)
- Time zone: UTC+01:00 (CET)
  - Summer (DST): UTC+02:00 (CEST)
- Postal codes: 98746
- Dialling codes: 036781
- Vehicle registration: SON, NH
- Website: www.goldisthal.de

Goldisthal (German pronunciation: [ˈɡɔldɪstaːl]) is a municipality in the Sonneberg district of Thuringia, Germany.

The Goldisthal Pumped Storage Station, one of Europe's largest pumped-storage hydroelectric power stations, is located in this village.
