= Hydroelectricity in Germany =

Germany had a hydropower installed capacity in 2024 of 14.5 GW, including 9.4 GW of pumped storage, up from 11,258 MW and 6,806 MW in 2016. Also in 2016, the country generated 21.5 TWh from hydroelectric plants, representing about 3% of the country's total electricity generation.

The hydropower capacity in Germany is considered mature and the potential already almost completely exploited, with limited room for growth. In recent years, growth in capacity has mainly come from repowering of existing plants.

== See also ==
- Energy in Germany
- Electricity sector in Germany
- Renewable energy in Germany
