= Goldisthal Pumped Storage Station =

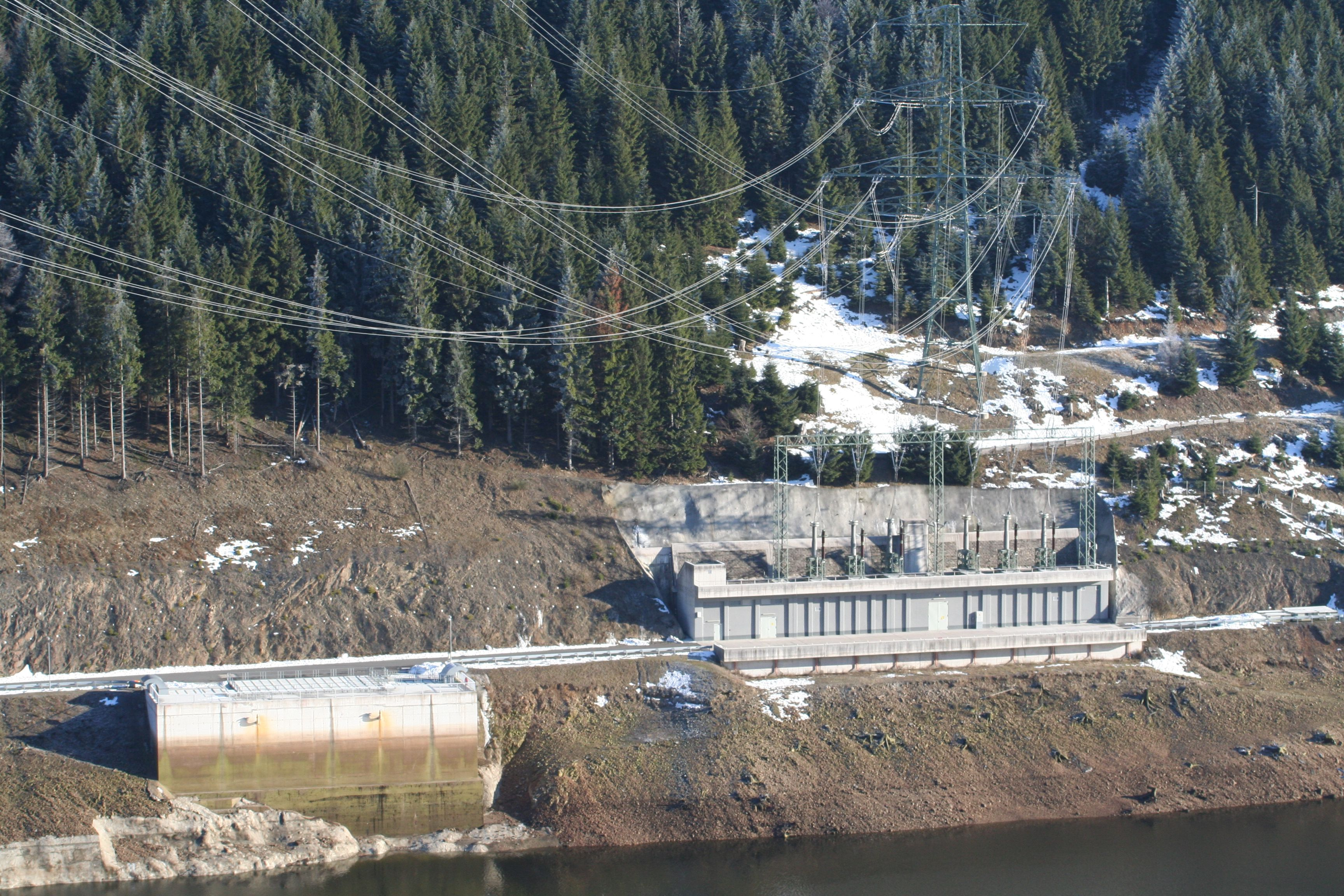
- The power station on the banks of the lower reservoir
- Official name: Pumpspeicherkraftwerk Goldisthal
- Country: Germany
- Location: Goldisthal
- Coordinates: 50°30′26″N 11°00′18″E
- Status: Operational
- Construction began: 1997
- Opening date: September 30, 2003
- Construction cost: 600M €
- Owner(s): Vattenfall

Upper reservoir
- Total capacity: 12,000,000 m^{3} (9,729 acre⋅ft)

Lower reservoir
- Total capacity: 18,900,000 m^{3} (15,322 acre⋅ft)

Power Station
- Hydraulic head: 302 m (991 ft)
- Pump-generators: 4 × 265 MW
- Installed capacity: 1,060 MW
- Capacity factor: 19.4%
- Storage capacity: 8.5 GWh
- Annual generation: 1,806 GW·h

The Goldisthal Pumped Storage Station is a pumped-storage power station in the Thueringer Mountains at the upper run of the river Schwarza in Goldisthal, Germany. It was constructed between 1997 and 2004. It has an installed capacity of 1,060 megawatts (1,420,000 hp), the largest hydroelectric power plant in Germany and one of largest in Europe.

Goldisthal Pumped Storage Station is owned and operated by Vattenfall (Vattenfall Wasserkraft GmbH).

== Facility ==
The upper reservoir is located at an altitude of 880 m (2,890 ft). It has an active (or usable) capacity of 12 million m³ and a surface area of 55 hectares. In order to create this basin, the mountain summit was cleared away. This stored quantity of water is enough for eight hours of operation. This corresponds to a maximally storable electric power quantity of 8.5 GWh with the existing height difference between storage basins and turbines. Two 800 m long penstocks, inclined at approximately 25 degrees serve as a conduit for water transfer. The lower reservoir has a capacity of 18.9 million cubic metres (670×10^{6} cu ft). The power station contains four 265 MW Francis pump turbines.

== Construction ==
From the outset of planning of this power station, it met with opposition and was contested with broad resistance from environmental protection groups, in particular from the Green League. The project was first discussed in 1965 and in 1975 geological investigations were carried out. Planning was halted in 1980–1981 due to funding issues but was then resumed in 1988. Construction eventually began in 1997 and the first generators were commissioned in 2003. It was officially opened on 30 September 2003. In 2004, all four generators were commissioned. The construction costs amounted to 600 million euros.

== See also ==
- Hydroelectricity in Germany
