= Masserberg =

- Municipality
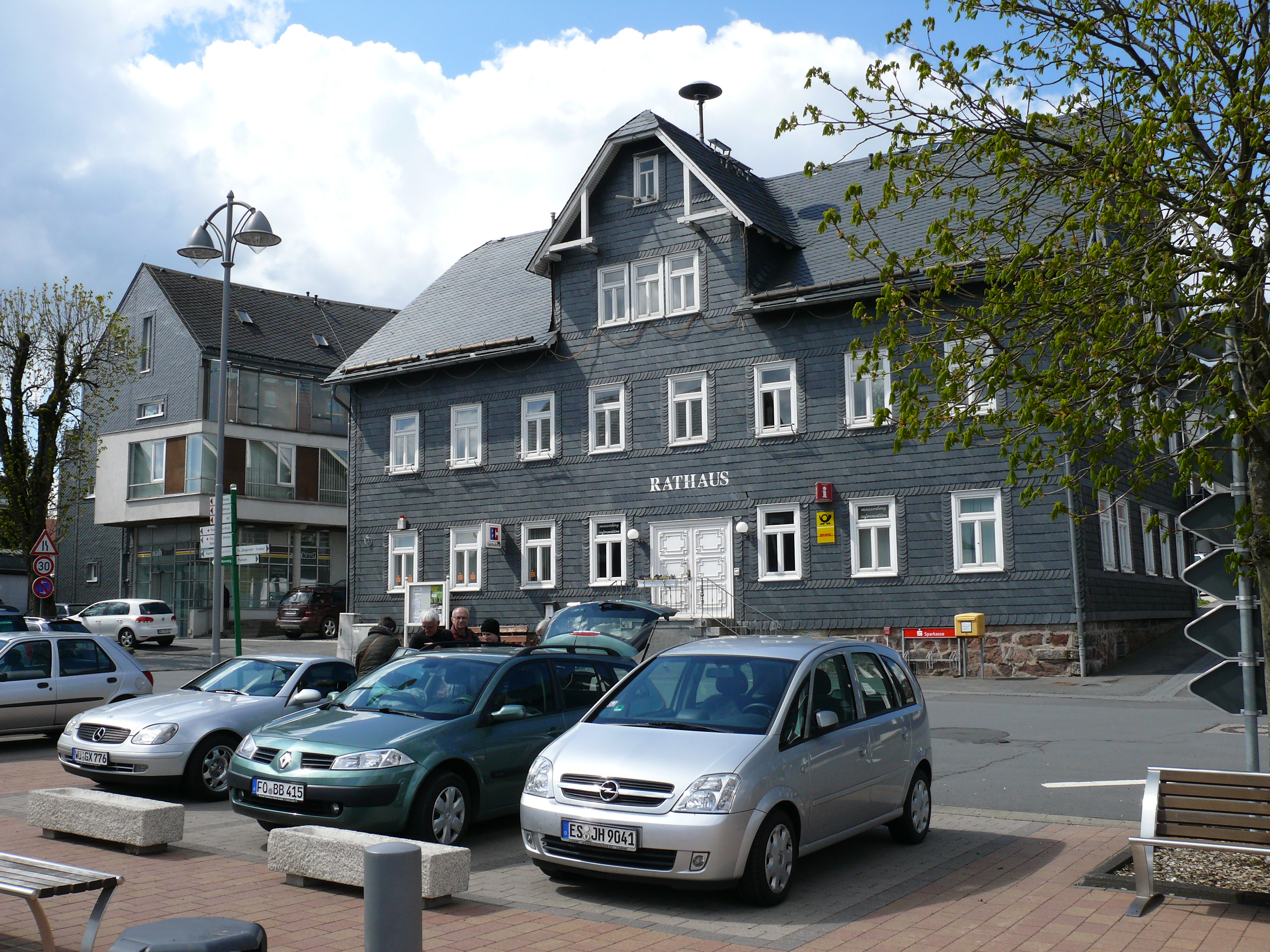
- Town hall

- Coat of arms

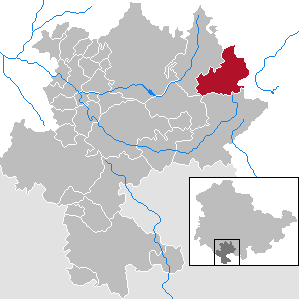
- Location of Masserberg within Hildburghausen district
- Interactive map of Masserberg
- Location within Germany Location within Thuringia
- Coordinates: 50°31′12″N 10°58′11″E
- Country: Germany
- State: Thuringia
- District: Hildburghausen
- Subdivisions: 5

Government
  - Mayor (2021–27): Denis Wagner (CDU)

Area
  - Total: 36.08 km^{2} (13.93 sq mi)
- Elevation: 780 m (2,560 ft)

Population (2025-12-31)
  - Total: 1,993
  - Density: 55.24/km^{2} (143.1/sq mi)
- Time zone: UTC+01:00 (CET)
  - Summer (DST): UTC+02:00 (CEST)
- Postal codes: 98666
- Dialling codes: 036870
- Vehicle registration: HBN
- Website: www.masserberg.de

Masserberg is a municipality in the district of Hildburghausen, in Thuringia, Germany.
