= Schleusegrund =

- Municipality
- Coat of arms

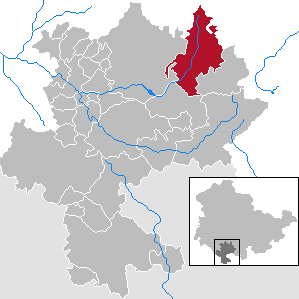
- Location of Schleusegrund within Hildburghausen district
- Interactive map of Schleusegrund
- Location within Germany Location within Thuringia
- Coordinates: 50°31′24″N 10°52′0″E
- Country: Germany
- State: Thuringia
- District: Hildburghausen
- Subdivisions: 5

Government
  - Mayor (2024–30): Heiko Schilling (FW)

Area
  - Total: 58.87 km^{2} (22.73 sq mi)
- Elevation: 445 m (1,460 ft)

Population (2025-12-31)
  - Total: 2,528
  - Density: 42.94/km^{2} (111.2/sq mi)
- Time zone: UTC+01:00 (CET)
  - Summer (DST): UTC+02:00 (CEST)
- Postal codes: 98667
- Dialling codes: 036874
- Vehicle registration: HBN
- Website: www.schleusegrund.de

Schleusegrund is a municipality in the district of Hildburghausen, in Thuringia, Germany.
