= Sonneberg (district) =

Coordinates: 50°25′N 11°10′E

- District
- Flag Coat of arms
- Country: Germany
- State: Thuringia
- Founded: 1868
- Capital: Sonneberg

Government
  - District admin.: Robert Sesselmann (AfD)

Area
  - Total: 460.83 km^{2} (177.93 sq mi)

Population (31 December 2024)
  - Total: 54,964
  - Density: 119.27/km^{2} (308.91/sq mi)
- Time zone: UTC+01:00 (CET)
  - Summer (DST): UTC+02:00 (CEST)
- Vehicle registration: SON, NH
- Website: www.landkreis-sonneberg.de

Sonneberg is a Kreis (district) in the south of Thuringia, Germany. Neighboring districts are (from the west clockwise) the districts Hildburghausen, Saalfeld-Rudolstadt, and the Bavarian districts Kronach and Coburg.

== History ==
The district was created in 1868 when districts were introduced in Saxe-Meiningen. In 1952, parts of the district were split off into a newly created district Neuhaus am Rennweg. In 1994, Neuhaus am Rennweg was dissolved and the district Sonneberg regained its original size. In 2019 the municipalities Lichte and Piesau from the district Saalfeld-Rudolstadt came as villages into the town Neuhaus am Rennweg in the district Sonneberg.

== Geography ==
The district is located on the southern slopes of the mountains of the Thuringian Forest. The land descends from the more than 800m tall hills (the highest elevation is the 869m high Großer Farmdenkopf) down to the lower plains Sonneberger Unterland and Schalkauer Platte. The Dreistromstein near Siegmundsburg near Neuhaus am Rennweg marks the intersection of three watersheds that drain into the rivers Rhine, Weser, and Elbe.

== Politics ==
Jürgen Köpper of the Christian Democratic Union (CDU) has served as interim district administrator since Hans-Peter Schmitz resigned in March 2023, citing health concerns. An early election to replace him took place on 11 June 2023, with a runoff held on 25 June. In the runoff, Jürgen Köpper was defeated by Robert Sesselmann of the Alternative for Germany (AfD). This marked the first time any AfD candidate had been elected district administrator, and the first executive position to be held by the party.

Candidate	Party	First round		Second round	
Candidate	Party	Votes	%	Votes	%
Robert Sesselmann	Alternative for Germany	10,941	46.7	14,992	52.8
Jürgen Köpper	Christian Democratic Union	8,371	35.7	13,419	47.2
Anja Schönheit	Social Democratic Party	3,107	13.3		
Nancy Schwalbach	The Left/The Greens	1,023	4.4		
Valid votes		23,442	98.9	28,411	98.7
Invalid votes		263	1.1	367	1.3
Total		23,705	100.0	28,778	100.0
Electorate/voter turnout		48,299	49.1	48,261	59.6
Source: Wahlen Thüringen

== Coat of arms ==
The coat of arms shows symbols of the historic states which make up the territory of the district. In the top left field is the lion as symbol of the county of Meißen. In the top right field is the symbol of the Lords of Sonneberg, which includes sheep shears. The bottom left field displays the symbol of the Counts of Schaumberg-Rauenstein, and the bottom right field shows the coat of arms of Saxony.

Coat of arms until 1952

Until 1952, a coat of arms introduced in the 1920s was used, which shows the coat of arms of the House of Henneberg instead of the Lords of Sonneberg in the top right field as another important part of Sonneberg's history.

== Towns and municipalities ==
Clickable map of towns and municipalities in the district

Towns
1. Lauscha
2. Neuhaus am Rennweg
3. Schalkau
4. Sonneberg
5. Steinach
Municipalities
1. Föritztal
2. Frankenblick
3. Goldisthal
