= Grümpen =

Grümpen may refer to:

- Grümpen, Frankenblick, a district of the municipality Frankenblick, Thuringia, Germany
- Grümpen (river), a river of Thuringia, Germany
