= Effelder =

Effelder may refer to the following places in Germany:

- Effelder, Eichsfeld, a municipality in the Eichsfeld district, Thuringia
- Effelder-Rauenstein, a municipality in the Sonneberg district, Thuringia
- Effelder (river), a river in Thuringia and Bavaria, tributary of the Itz
