= Röthen =

River in Germany

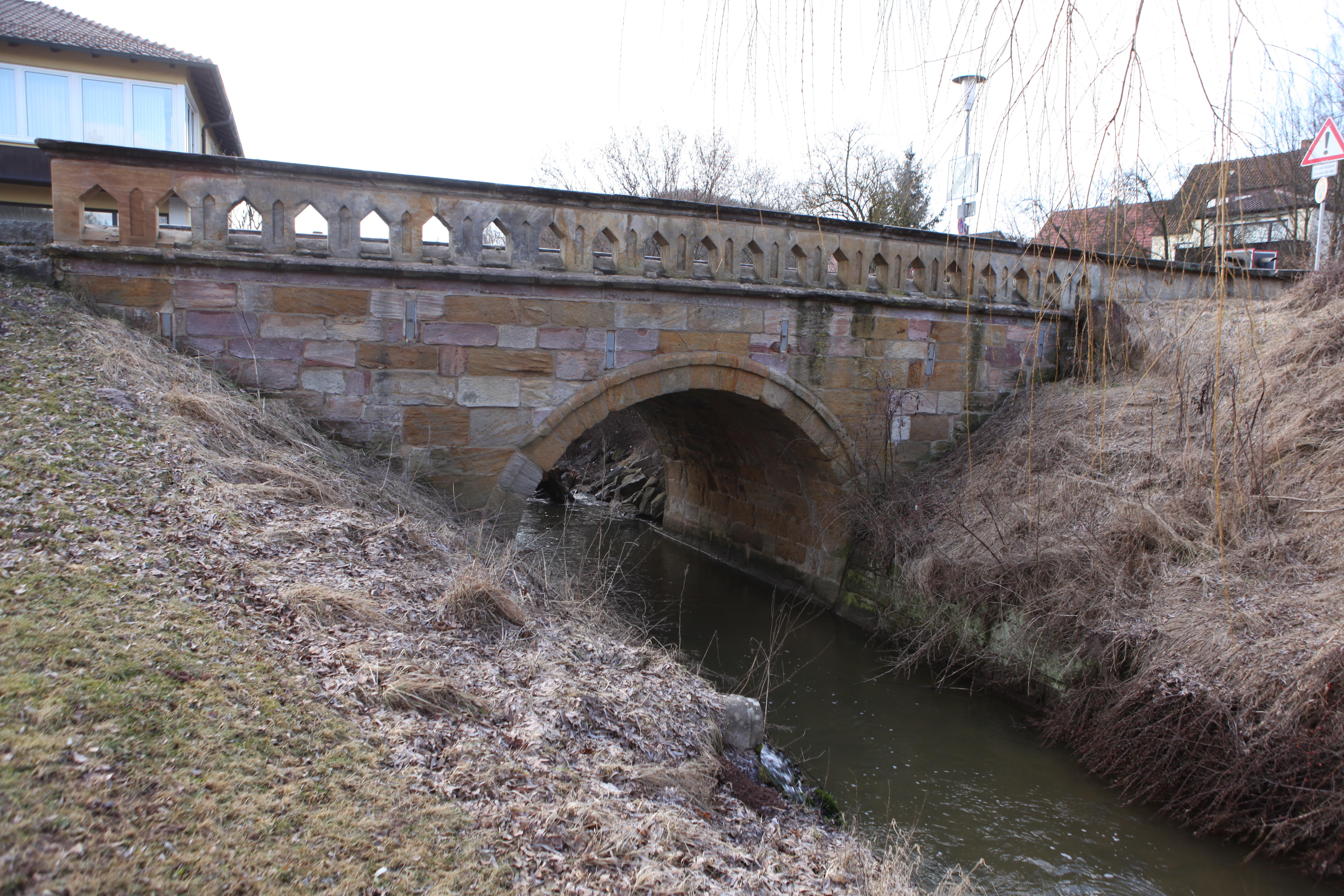
- Bridge of the Röthen in Mönchröden (borough of Rödental)

Location
- Country: Germany
- States: Thuringia and Bavaria

Physical characteristics
- Mouth
  - location: Itz
  - coordinates: 50.2819°N 11.0208°E
- Length: 26.2 km (16.3 mi)

Basin features
- Progression: Itz→ Main→ Rhine→ North Sea

Röthen (German pronunciation: [ˈʁøːtn̩]; in Bavaria: Röden [ˈʁøːdn̩]) is a river in Thuringia and Bavaria, Germany. It passes through Sonneberg and Neustadt bei Coburg, and flows into the Itz near Rödental.

== See also ==
- List of rivers of Thuringia
- List of rivers of Bavaria

== Geographical Area ==
The Röthen originates near Wiefelsburg, an isolated farmstead located between Steinach and Mengersgereuth-Hämmern in Thuringia. From its source on the southern edge of the Thuringian Highland the district Sonnebarg, the Röthen flows through the Naturschutzgebiet Röthengrund, passing through the town of Sonneberg and crossing the border into Upper Franconia, Bavaria. In Upper Franconia, the local Itzgründisch dialect maintains the pronunciation" Rüed'n'", while the official spelling changes to Röden. The Röden flows through Neustadt and Rödental, and joins the Itz at Rödental.
