= Froschgrundsee =

Retention basin in Rödental, Upper Franconia, Germany

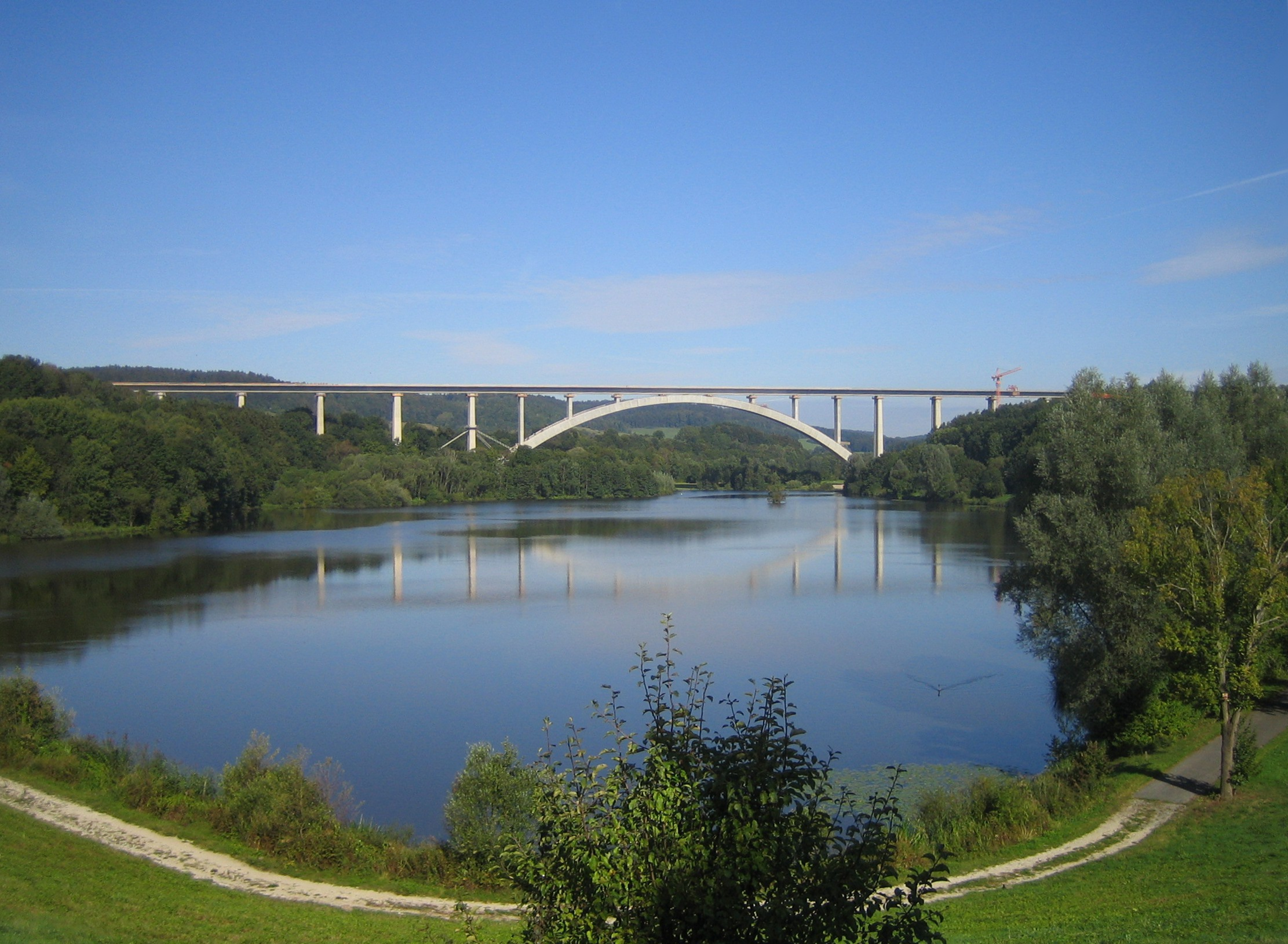
- Froschgrundsee in 2009 with the Froschgrundsee Bridge in the background
- Interactive map of Froschgrundsee
- Coordinates: 50°21′0″N 11°1′42″E
- Construction began: 1982
- Opening date: 1986

Dam and spillways
- Height (foundation): 18 m
- Height (thalweg): 3407 m
- Length: 350 m (1,150 ft)
- Elevation at crest: 359 m
- Width (crest): 9 m
- Dam volume: 420000 m^{3}

Reservoir
- Total capacity: 69 Mio. m^{3}
- Active capacity: 66 Mio. m^{3}
- Catchment area: 11084 km^{2}
- Surface area: 94 ha
- Normal elevation: 3445 m

Froschgrundsee, also known as Schönstädtspeicher, is a retention basin to protect the city of Coburg in Bavaria from the flooding of the Itz, Effelder, and the Grümpen. It lies in the municipality of Rödental in Upper Franconia. Froschgrundsee was completed in 1986 after four years of construction and cost 43 million DM in operations.
