= Effelder (river) =

River in Germany

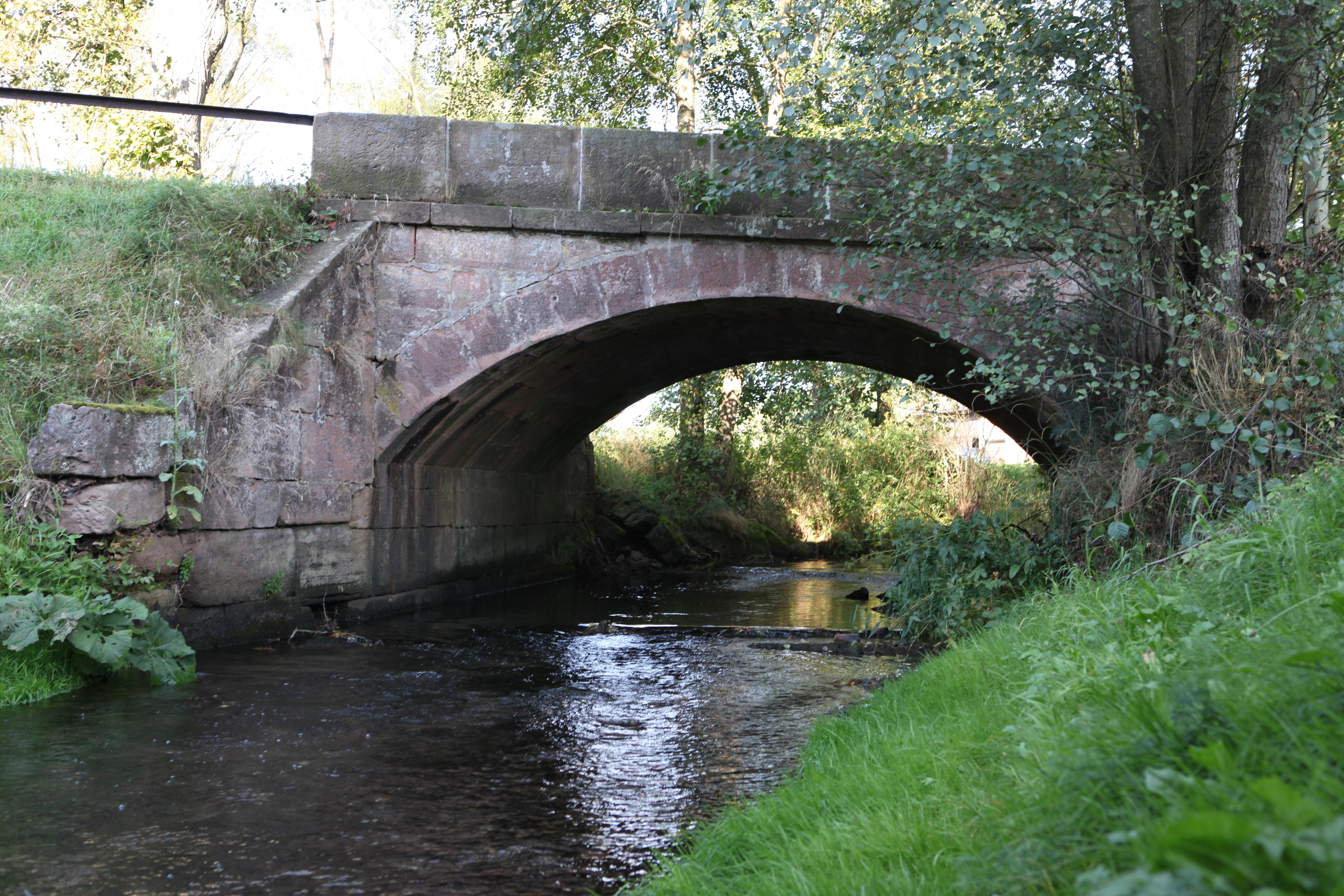
- Bridge above the Effelder built 1891, in Döhlau

Location
- Country: Germany
- States: Thuringia and Bavaria

Physical characteristics
- Mouth
  - location: Itz
  - coordinates: 50.3519°N 11.0294°E
- Length: 17.3 km (10.7 mi)

Basin features
- Progression: Itz→ Main→ Rhine→ North Sea

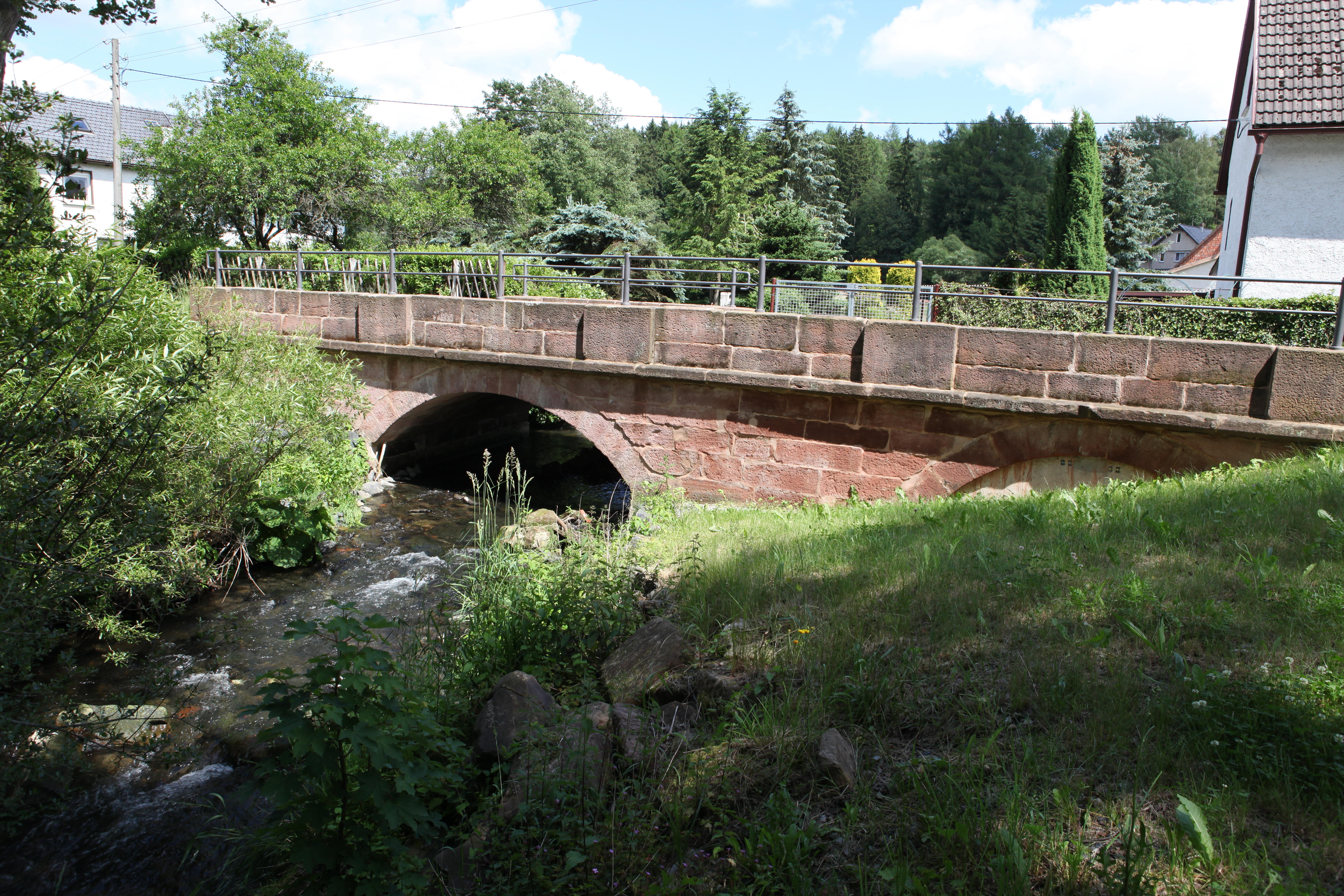
Bridge above the Effelder built 1908, in Döhlau

Effelder (German pronunciation: [ˈɛfɛldɐ]) is a 17 km (11 mi) tributary river of the Itz in the districts of Sonneberg (Thuringia) and Coburg (Bavaria), Germany. It flows into the Froschgrundsee, which is drained by the Itz, near Schönstädt (a part of Rödental).

== See also ==
- List of rivers of Bavaria
- List of rivers of Thuringia
