= Rodach (Itz) =

River in Germany

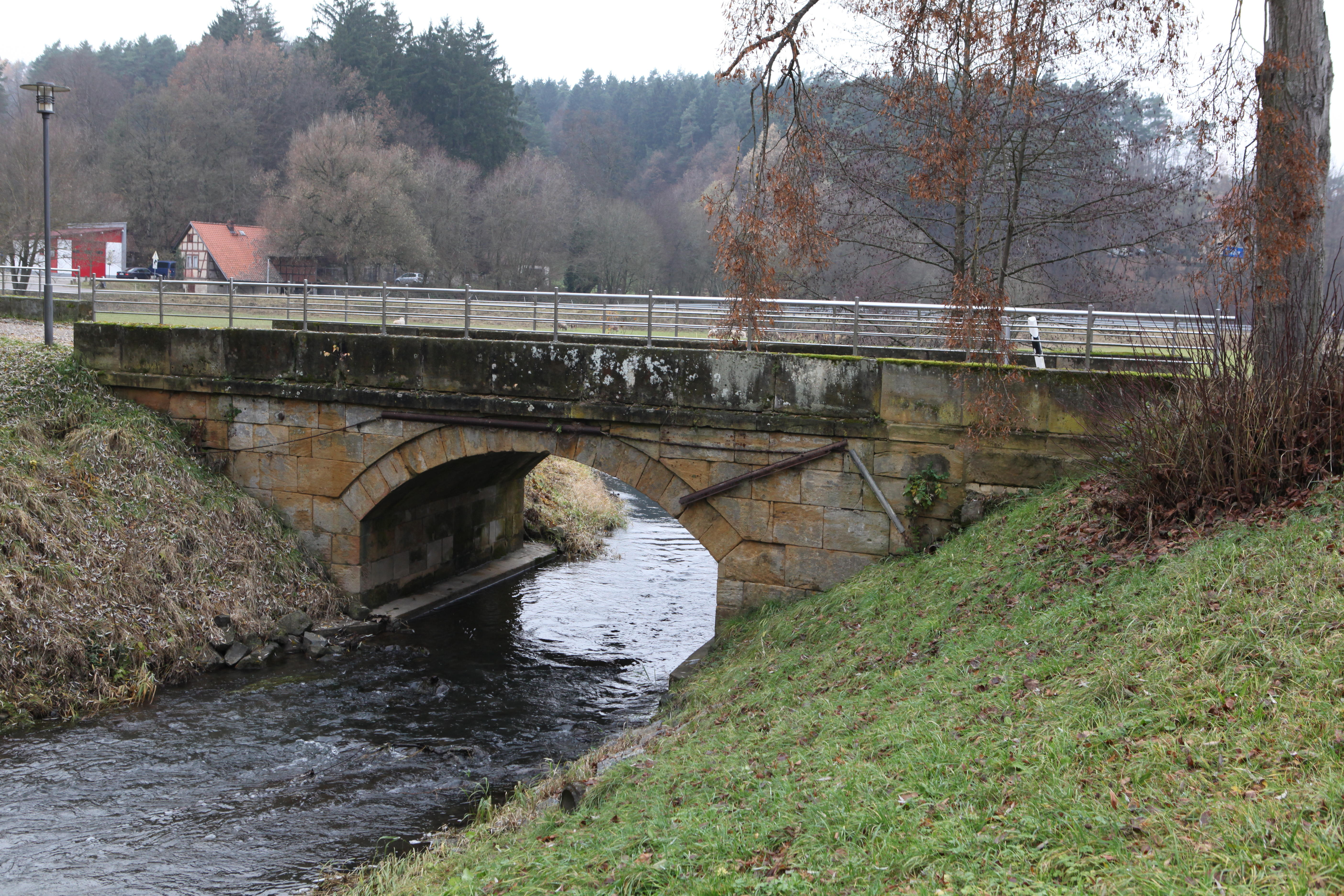
- Bridge over the Rodach in Bad Colberg, a neighborhood of Heldburg

Location
- Country: Germany
- States: Bavaria and Thuringia

Physical characteristics
- Mouth
  - location: Itz
  - coordinates: 50.1347°N 10.8768°E
- Length: 46.1 km (28.6 mi)
- Basin size: 391 km^{2} (151 sq mi)

Basin features
- Progression: Itz→ Main→ Rhine→ North Sea

Rodach (German pronunciation: [ˈʁoːdax]) is a river of Bavaria and of Thuringia, Germany. It is a left tributary of the Itz near Itzgrund. It passes through Bad Rodach.

== See also ==
- List of rivers of Bavaria
- List of rivers of Thuringia
