= Wöhner GmbH & Co. KG =

- Type: GmbH & Co. KG
- Industry: Electrical equipment
- Founded: 1929
- Headquarters: Rödental, Germany
- Area served: Worldwide
- Key people: Alex Büttner, Jochen Dressel, Frank Wöhner
- Products: Switchgear, Busbar system, Circuit breaker
- Website: www.woehner.com

Wöhner GmbH & Co. KG is a German private limited company located in Rödental southern part of Germany. Founded in 1929 the company develops, manufactures and sells Busbars for Distribution board & electrical enclosures and has presence in 80 countries worldwide & in a study found the company among top 180 fastest growing companies in Germany. and was started by Mr Alfred Wöhner in 1929.

== Product range ==
The company manufacturers for low voltage segment

=== Products ===
- Busbar systems
- Fuse holders
- Motor starter with reversing function
- Panel mounting components
- Fuse
- Value added services
