= Johann Lorenz Bach =

- Born: 20 September 1695; Schweinfurt
- Died: 14 December 1773 (aged 78); Itzgrund
- Occupations: Composer; Organist

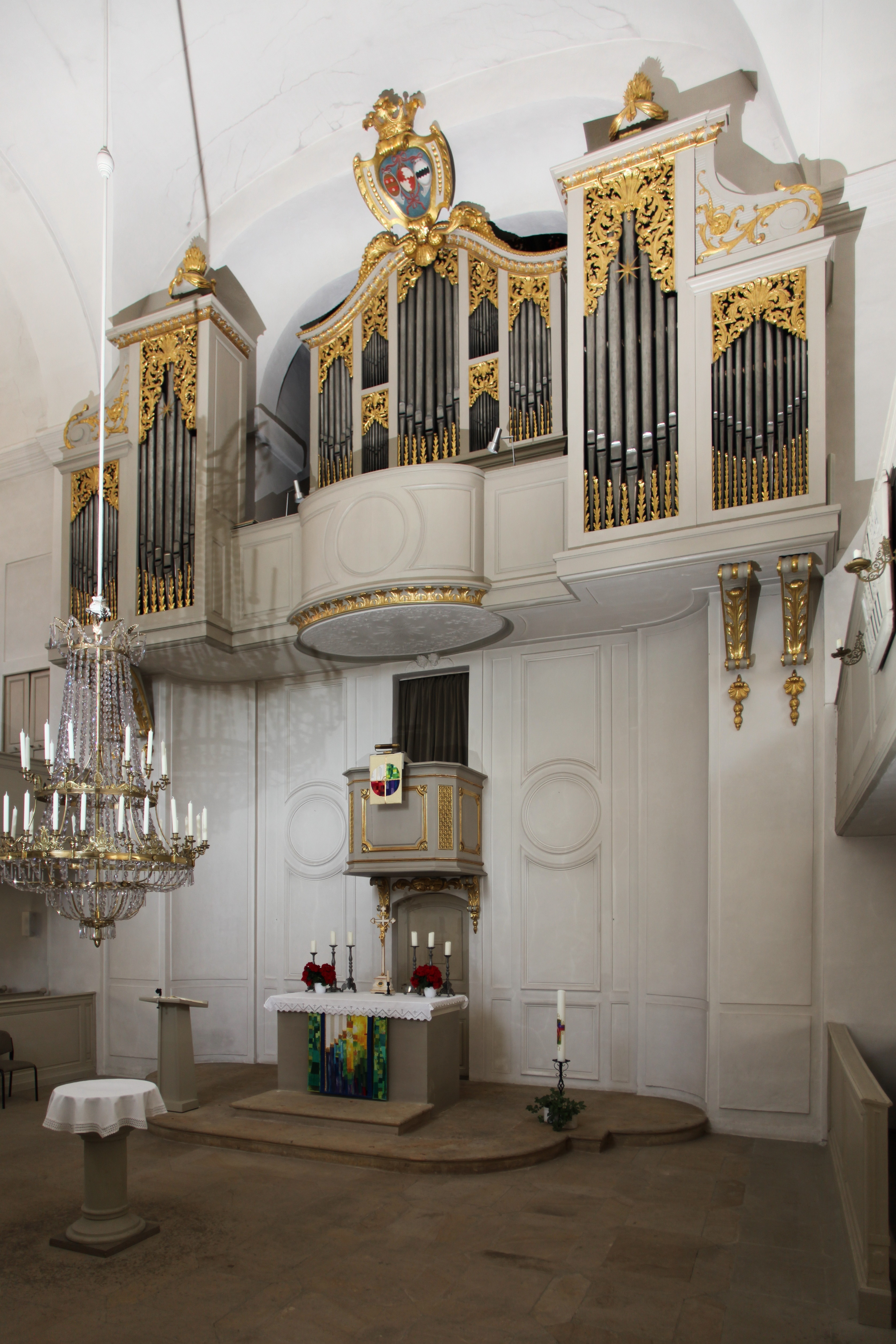
The organ of J. L. Bach

Johann Lorenz Bach (20 September [O.S. 10 September] 1695 – 14 December 1773) was a German organist and composer of the Franconian branch of the Bach family.

== Biography ==
Born in Schweinfurt, Johann Lorenz Bach got his first music training by his father Johann Valentin Bach, and from 1715 to 1717 lived in Weimar as a student of Johann Sebastian Bach. From 1718 to his death in 1773 he was choirmaster, organist, and schoolmaster in the Freiherrlich Lichtensteinische Residenz Lahm im Itzgrund, the court of the Freiherr in Itzgrund (near Coburg).

The organ in this church was built in 1732 by Heinrich Gottlieb Herbst, an organ builder from Halberstadt, with 29 stops on two manuals and pedal. Bach played there for more than fifty years. The instrument is completely preserved in the original condition. He died in Itzgrund in 1773.

== Compositions ==
Only one Prelude and Fugue in D major exists. Other works by Johann Lorenz Bach are lost. A copy of the Prelude exists in the Lahm parish archive near the church.
