= Liebau =

Liebau may refer to:

== Places ==
- Minihof-Liebau, Austria
- The German name for Lubawka, Poland
- Liebau (Thuringia), a village that was given up and torn down by East Germany after two waves of Republikflucht.

== People with the surname ==
- Carol Platt Liebau, attorney, political analyst and commentator based near Los Angeles

== See also ==
- Libau (disambiguation)
