= Grümpen (river) =

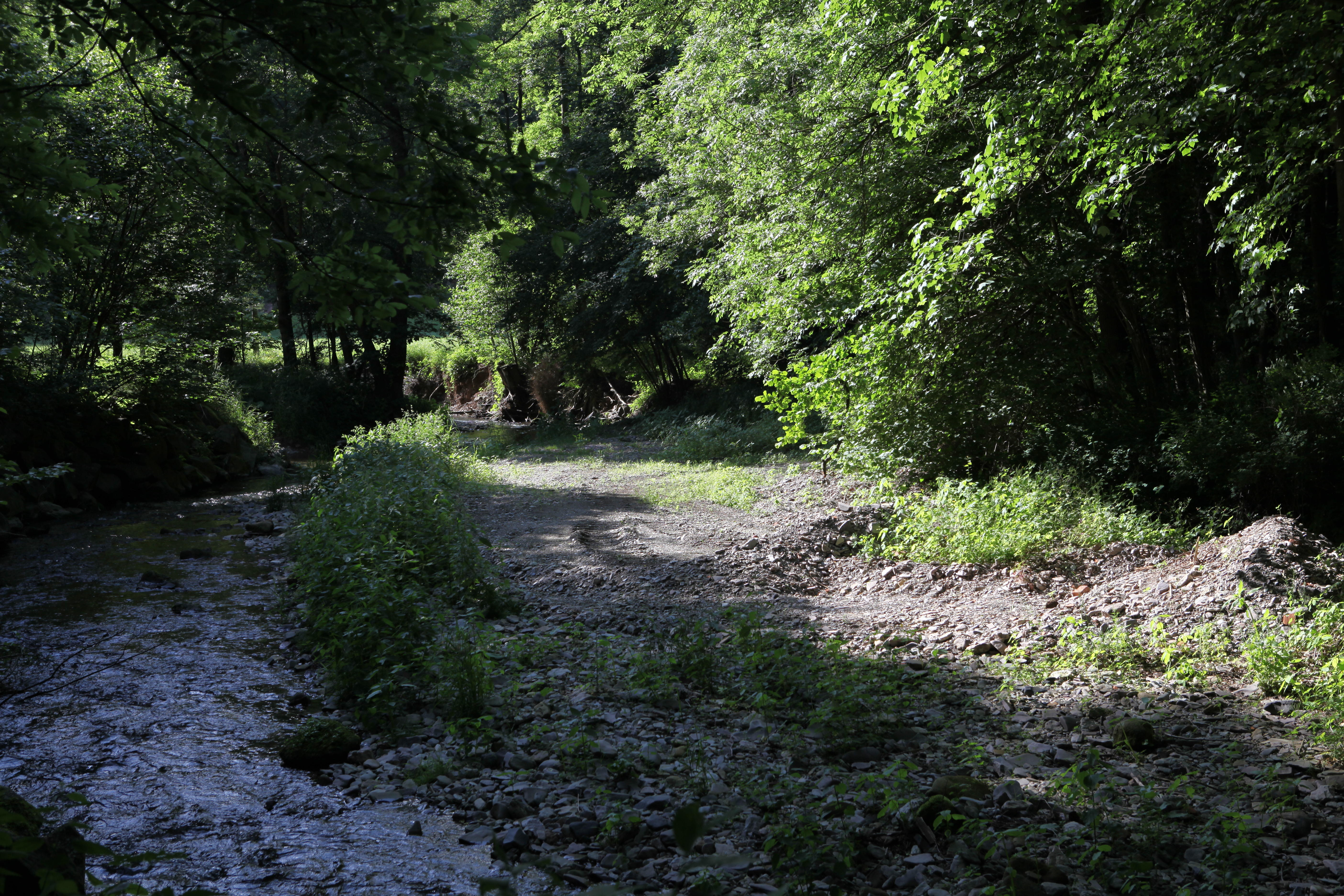

Location
- Country: Germany
- States: Thuringia

Physical characteristics
- Mouth
  - location: Itz
  - coordinates: 50.3675°N 11.0077°E

Basin features
- Progression: Itz→ Main→ Rhine→ North Sea

Grümpen is a river of Thuringia, Germany. It flows into the Itz in Almerswind.

== See also ==
- List of rivers of Thuringia
