= Baunach =

- Town
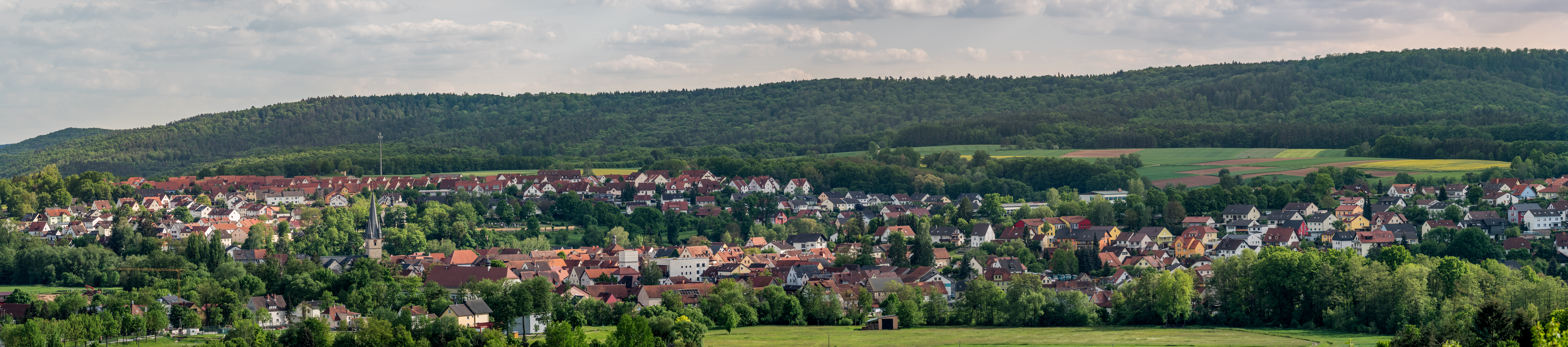
- Panorama view of Baunach

- Coat of arms

- Location of Baunach within Bamberg district
- Interactive map of Baunach
- Location within Germany Location within Bavaria
- Coordinates: 49°58′N 10°50′E
- Country: Germany
- State: Bavaria
- Admin. region: Oberfranken
- District: Bamberg
- Municipal assoc.: Baunach

Government
  - Mayor (2020–26): Tobias Roppelt

Area
  - Total: 32.14 km^{2} (12.41 sq mi)
- Elevation: 238 m (781 ft)

Population (2025-12-31)
  - Total: 4,131
  - Density: 128.5/km^{2} (332.9/sq mi)
- Time zone: UTC+01:00 (CET)
  - Summer (DST): UTC+02:00 (CEST)
- Postal codes: 96148
- Dialling codes: 09544
- Vehicle registration: BA
- Website: https://www.vg-baunach.de/

Baunach (German pronunciation: [ˈbaʊnax]) is a town in the Upper Franconian district of Bamberg and the seat of the administrative community (Verwaltungsgemeinschaft) of Baunach. Until administrative reform in 1972, Baunach belonged to the Lower Franconian district of Ebern.

Baunach calls itself the “Franconian Three-River Town” because it lies on the rivers Baunach, Lauter and Main. These three rivers are depicted in the town's coat of arms, in which a golden pike lies over the three rivers. In 2002, the town celebrated its 1,200-year jubilee. Moreover, the river Itz flows through the community area.

The name Baunach comes from the Indo-Germanic word for river: bunahu. This may be translated as “swelling water”. For thousands of years the entire region near Baunach has been populated by Celts and Franconians.

== Geography ==
Baunach lies on the right bank of the Main, 11 km north of Bamberg. Kraiberg (with a height of 365 metres) and Stiefenberg (396 metres high) are the most important mountains in the area. Baunach lies within the Hassberge and thus is member city of the Haßberge Nature Park.

=== Constituent communities ===
Baunach's main town and namesake centre is by far the biggest of its Ortsteile with a population of 3,069. The town furthermore has these outlying centres, each given here with its own population figure:

- Daschendorf 88
- Dorgendorf 342
- Godelhof 13
- Godeldorf 56
- Leucherhof 2
- Priegendorf 345
- Reckenneusig 227

The town also has these traditional rural land units, known in German as Gemarkungen: Appendorf, Baunach, Daschendorf, Dorgendorf, Priegendorf, Reckenneusig, Stiefenberg, Daschendorfer Forst, Lußberger Forst.

The last-named two are wooded areas without any inhabitant. It is traditional for a Gemarkung to be named after a town or village lying nearby.

== History ==
The first sources of a city called Baunach date from the year 802. Nevertheless, the entire region from Baunach to the Staffelberg has been populated for thousands of years. Emperor Ludwig the Bavarian bestowed upon Baunach town rights in 1328. The town was both an Obervogtamt (“higher reeve’s office”) and headquarters of a famous regional knight county before Secularization and belonged to the Prince-Bishopric of Bamberg. In 1727, the last execution was carried out in Baunach. In 1803 Baunach came to Bavaria as a result of the Reichsdeputationshauptschluss. After World War II many refugees came to Baunach.

=== Population development ===
Within the town's area, 2,914 inhabitants were counted in 1970, 3,174 in 1987 and 3,807 in 2000. On 30 June 2007 it was 3,933.

== Politics ==
The current mayor is Tobias Roppelt (Christliche Bürgerschaft Baunach), elected in March 2020. Previous mayors were:

- 2002–2020: Ekkehard Hojer (CBB)
- before 2002: Georg Wild (CSU)

=== Town council ===
Party	Seats (2020)
Christliche Bürgerschaft	6
CSU	4
SPD/Freie Bürger Baunach	3
Christliche Wählerunion Baunach	2
Die PARTEI	1
Total	16

In 1999 the town's tax revenue, converted to euros, was €1,791,000, of which business taxes (net) amounted to €414,000.

=== Coat of arms ===
On 15 July 1447, the Bamberg Bishop Anton von Rotenhan conferred upon the market town of Baunach “ein sigill und panir” (“a seal and banner”). He made clear the charges (not the colours, though – they only came later) to appear in the town's arms: “sullen steen drey wasserfluss. Und durch dieselben drey wasserfluss soll ein gantzer hecht mit dem haupt von der einen obern ecke des schilts.... geen.” (“shall stand three rivers. And through the same three rivers shall go a whole pike with the head from the one upper corner of the shield”).

The three rivers are the Baunach, the Lauter and the Main. The pike symbolizes the town's wealth of fish. Prince-Bishop Johann Philipp von Gebsattel (1599–1609) completed the coloured arms with the following colours: red for the field, silver for the rivers and gold for the pike.

== Public institutions ==
=== Sport and leisure facilities ===
- football field
- tennis court
- indoor swimming pool
- skating track
- bathing lake
- fishing pond
- boarding and landing stage for the Kanuerlebnis Obermain (“Upper Main Canoe Experience” – planned)

== Culture and sightseeing ==
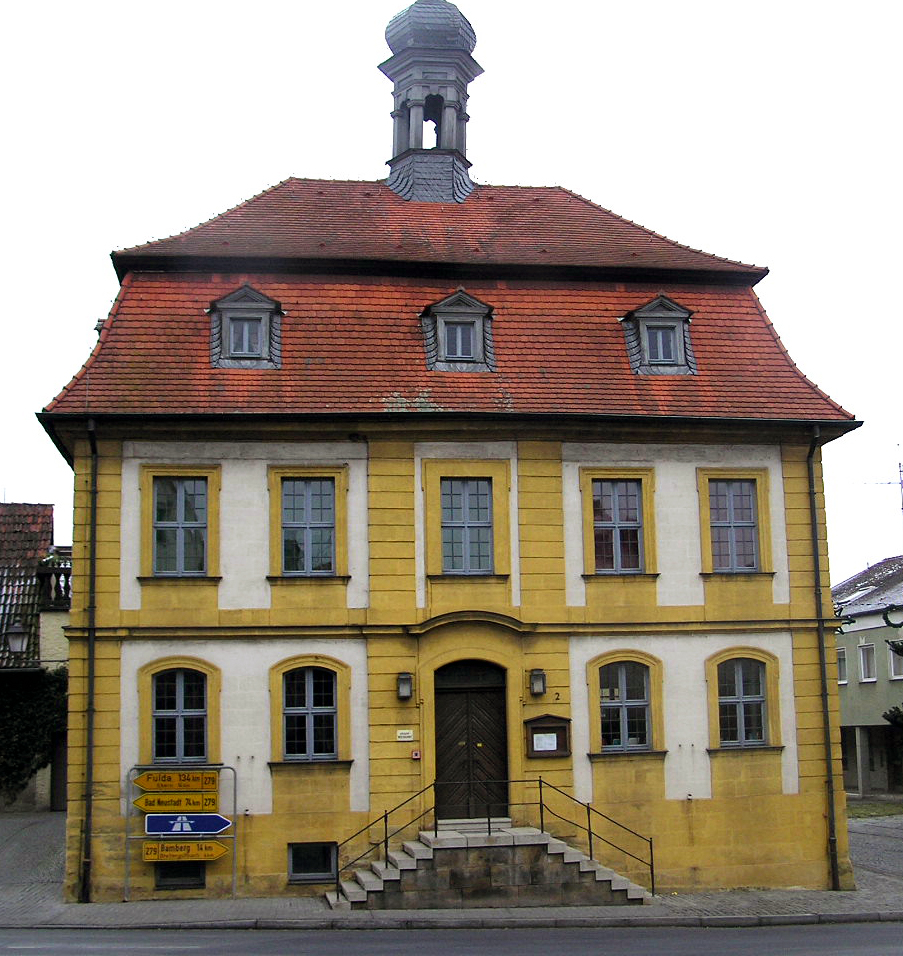
Old Town Hall

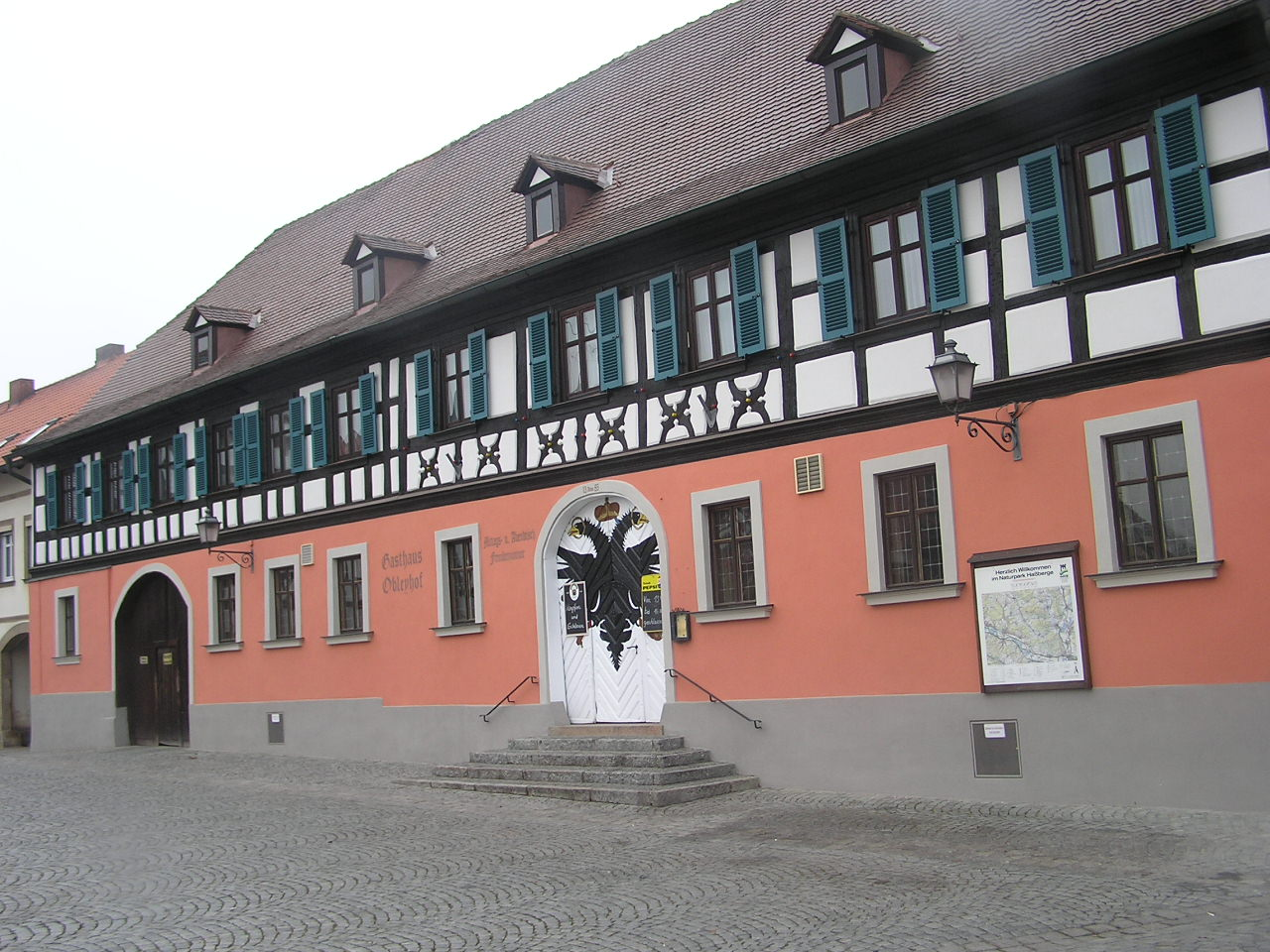
Obleyhof

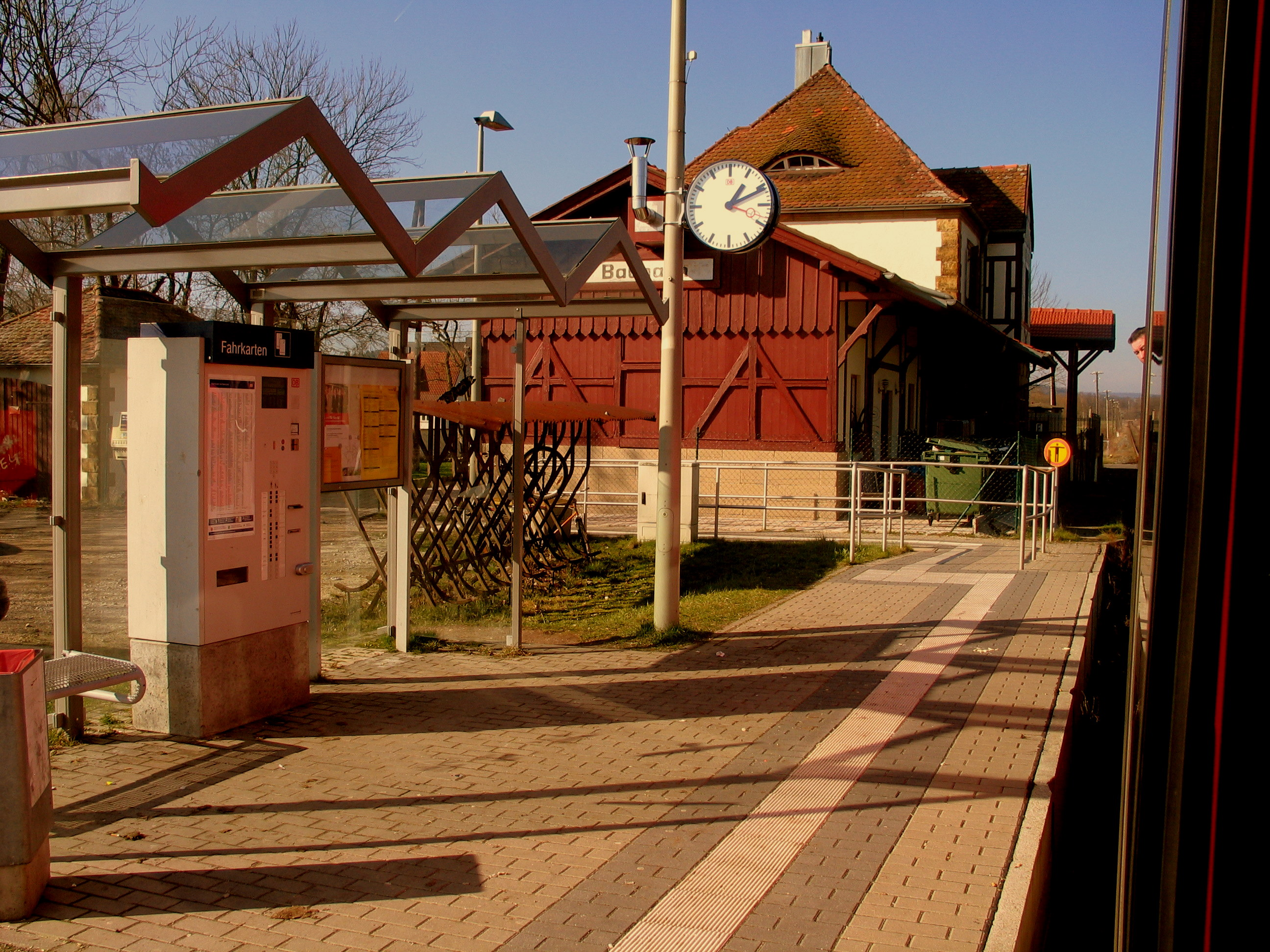
Railway station

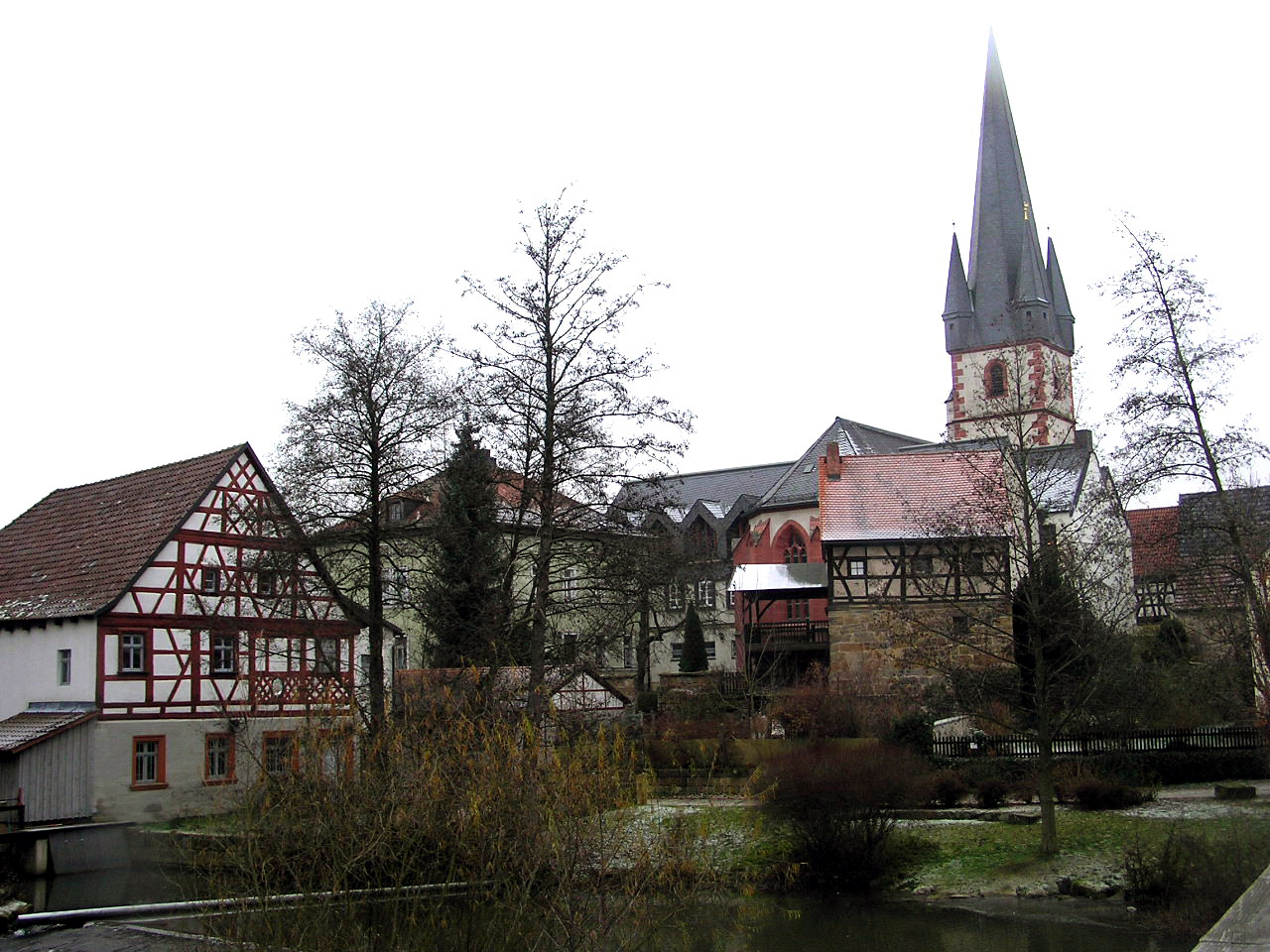
Schrepfersmühle (mill) and parish church with charnel house, seen from the river Baunach

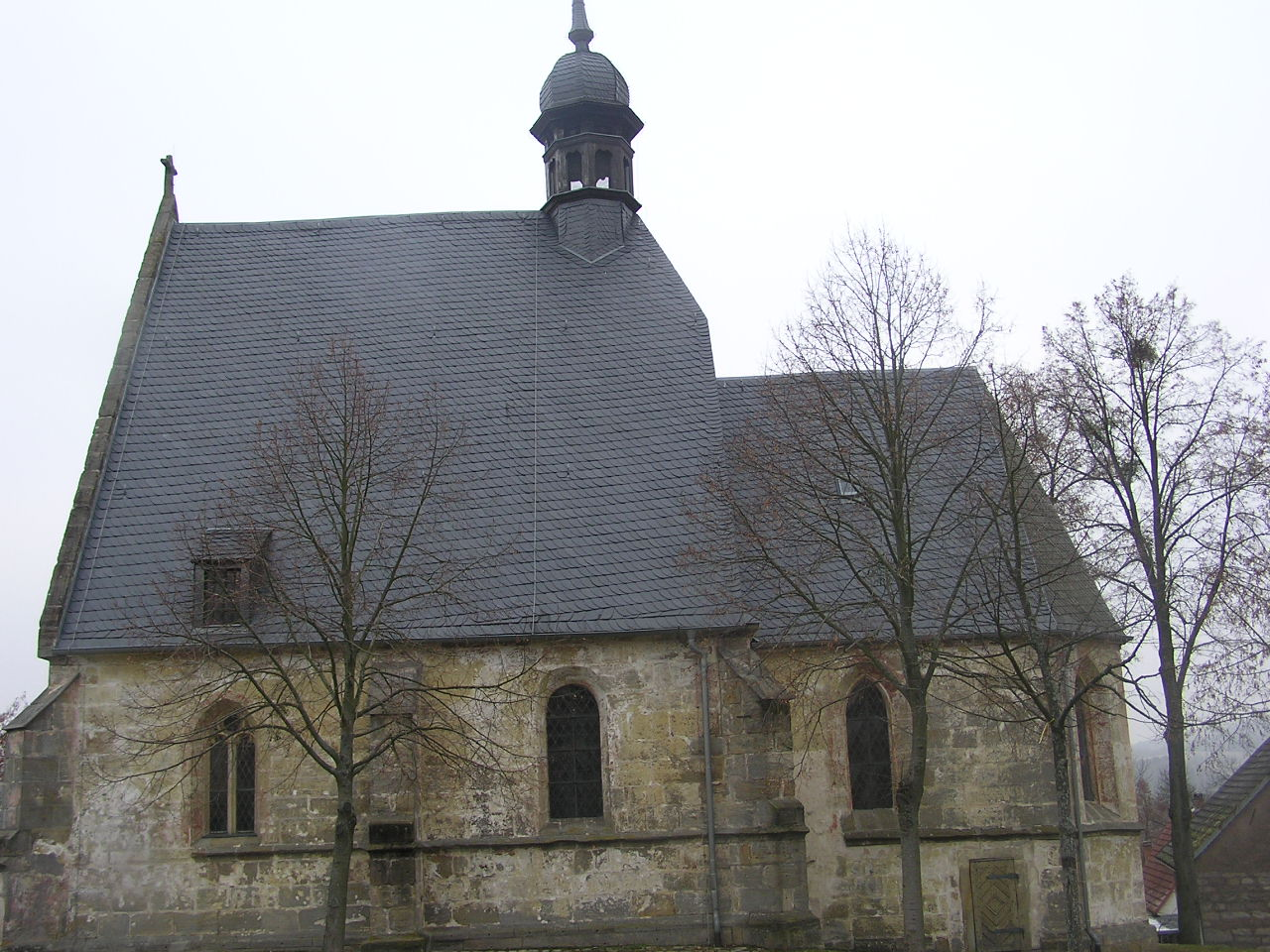
Magdalenenkapelle (chapel)

=== Museums ===
The Heimatmuseum Baunach (“homeland” or local museum) at the Old Town Hall has exhibits from the town's and the parish's prehistory and early history as well as from Baunach's club life. There are also agricultural devices and others from historical crafting as well as from town and country households. In the town hall's former session chamber is found a comprehensive collection by painter and graphic artist Max Schnös.

=== Buildings ===
- The historic marketplace with timber-frame houses, among them the Obleyhof, first mentioned in a document in 1385, which was owned by the Bamberg Cathedral Capitular. Each new Cathedral Capitular received the Hof as an Obley (“bonus”); fountain with statue of the late Überkum
- The Parish Church, consecrated to Saint Oswald, with tower from the year 1244 and the choir from about 1460. Beside the church is found a former two-storey charnel house. The great church pipe organ exists of the following organ stops (translated as far as possible):

Hauptwerk C–g^{3}
1.	Pommer	16'
2.	Diapason	8'
3.	Octave	4'
4.	Supraoctave	2'
5.	Mixture V	2'
6.	Gamba	8'
7.	Traversflute	8'
8.	Conical Flute	4'
9.	Cornet V (beginning at f)	8'
10.	Spanish Trumpets (en Chamade)	8'
11.	I-II
12.	III-II

Pedal C–g^{1}
13.	Diapason bass	16'
14.	Octave Bass	8'
15.	Choral Bass	4'
16.	Sub Bass	16'
17.	Bordoun	8'
18.	Trumpet	8'
19.	Posaune	16'
20.	I-P
21.	II-P
22.	III-P

Schwellwerk C–g^{3}
23.	Chimney flute	8'
24.	Diapason	4'
25.	Mixture of strings IV	2'
26.	Salicional	8'
27.	Piffara (beginning at f)	8'
28.	Blockflöte	4'
29.	Nasard	2^{2}/_{3}'
30.	Seventeenth	1^{3}/_{5}'
31.	Waldflöte (Tibia Silvestris)	2'
32.	Dulcian	16’
33.	Oboe	8'
34.	Tremulant

Rückpositiv C–g^{3}
35.	Wooden Gedackt	8'
36.	Spillflute	4'
37.	Diapason	2'
38.	Twelfth	1^{1}/_{3}'
39.	Cimbel	1'
40.	Cromorne	8'
41.	Tremulant
42.	III-I

The local organists are Hubert Reinhard, who is vice-organist of the Basilica minor in Vierzehnheiligen, Marga Büttner, and Matthias Bahr.

- The Late Gothic Magdalenenkapelle (chapel, built about 1430, expanded in 1473 with the endowment from the late Überkum) at the graveyard; inside is found a high altar from 1693 and the late Überkum's grave. Its organ is a special attraction including a rare organ effect stop called Rossignol ("Vogelschrey") which imitates the sound of singing birds.
- The Zentscheune (“tithe barn”); here, the tithes were stored, the tax for the Holzkirchen Convent in Fulda.
- The Schächer, a small chapel with a wooden cross from 1520. It lies on the way to the former execution place.
- Old Town Hall, called Schloss Schadeck, built between 1742 and 1746 by master builder Justus Dientzenhofer; today houses the Heimatmuseum.
- Remains of the old town wall with Marienmarter (Martyrdom of Mary) from about 1720
- The prince-bishop's Amtsschloss (“Office Palace”), also called the hunting palace, a Late Baroque building built by the Prince-Bishop of Bamberg Marquard Sebastian Schenk von Stauffenberg, and completed by his successor Prince-Bishop Lothar Franz von Schönborn.
- The “Wooden Men”, an oaken gate with two men. It once stood before the building across the street, the old Kastenhof, which housed the court from 1710 to 1803.

=== Regular events ===
Baunach holds a Kirchweih (church consecration festival), Altstadtfest (old town festival), Magdalenenmarkt (Magdalen Market) and Weihnachtsmarkt (Christmas Market).
