= St. Johannis, Schalkau =

St. Johannis
- Johanniskirche
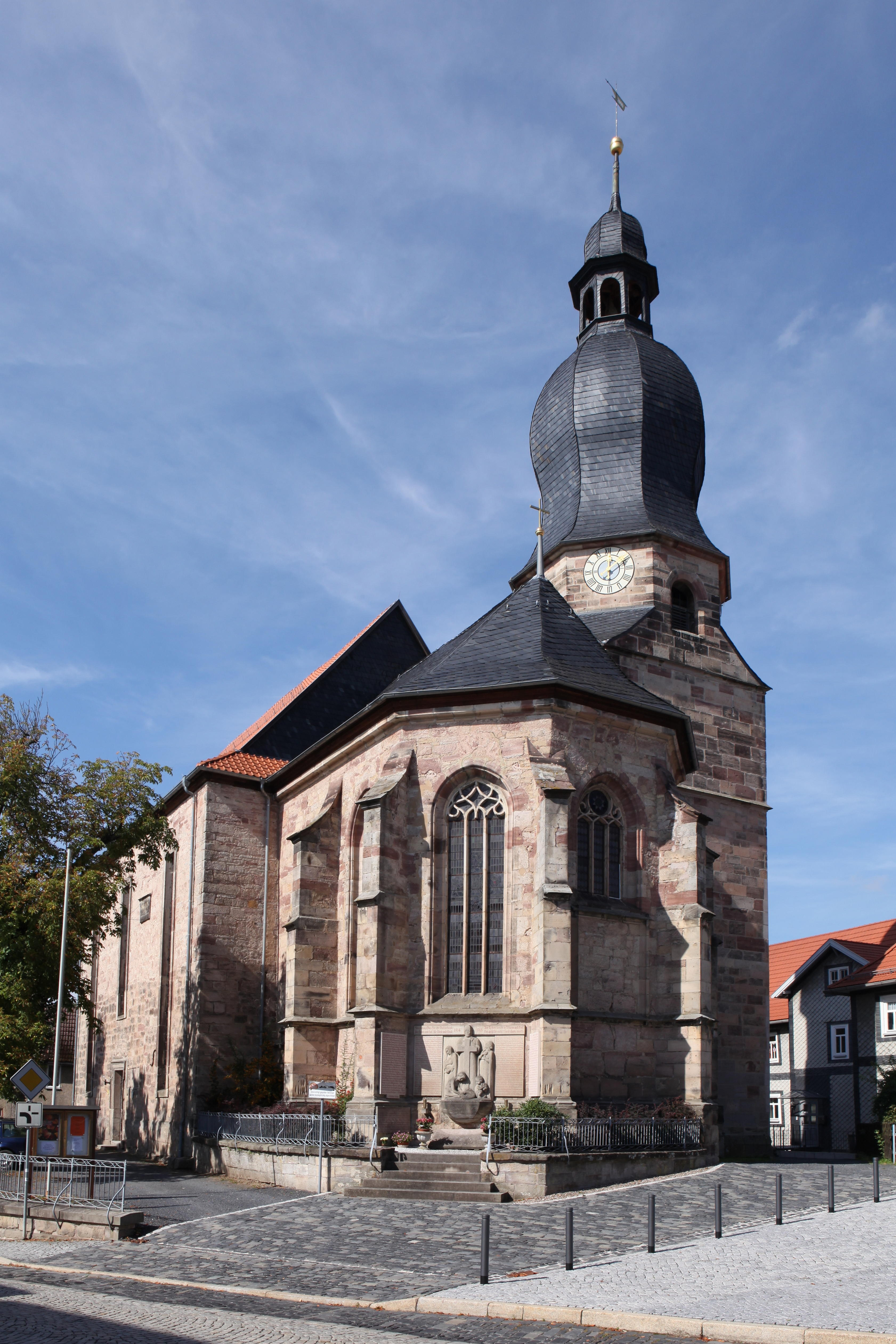

- 50°23′38″N 11°00′19″E
- Location: Schalkau, Thuringia
- Country: Germany
- Denomination: Lutheran

History
- Status: Parish church
- Founded: Middle Ages
- Dedication: John the Baptist

Architecture
- Functional status: Active
- Style: Romanesque, Gothic

St. Johannis or Johanniskirche (John's Church) is a Lutheran church and parish, dedicated to John the Baptist, in Schalkau, Thuringia, Germany. The listed monument is a landmark of the town.

== History ==
The sacristy is the oldest part of the present building, built in Romanesque style in the 13th century. The building was first mentioned in 1232, listing the name of a priest. The church to which it belonged burnt down in 1505. Building of a new church began in 1516 with a choir in late-Gothic style. It was dedicated to John the Baptist in 1520 by bishop Nicopolis. The choir held a high altar and two side altars.

The nave was added in the 16th century, and renovated in 1663. In 1690, the town was hit by a fire, and the church burnt down again. It was restored in 1700, and the steeple added.

The present interior was shaped by Baumeister Rommel in 1884. The third balcony was removed, and the remaining two were painted. The choir was crowned with a star vault. Walls and ceiling were painted in moderation. Two life-size figures of Martin Luther and Philip Melanchthon were added, but the latter disappeared. The organ was moved from the choir to the second balcony.

The parish is part of Kirchenkreis Sonneberg.

== Literature ==
- Thomas Schwämmlein (2005). Kulturdenkmale in Thüringen. Landkreis Sonneberg (in German). Altenburg: E. Reinhold Verlag. p. 347. ISBN 3-937940-09-X.
