= Libau =

Libau may refer to:

- Libau, Manitoba, a community in Canada
- Libau, the German name for Liepāja, Latvia
- Libau, the German name for Łubowo, Greater Poland Voivodeship, Poland
- SS Libau, a ship renamed Aud, which attempted to bring arms to Ireland in 1916 under German auspices to aid in the Easter Rising

== See also ==
- Liebau (disambiguation)
