= Korberoth =

Coordinates: 50°21′33.42″N 11°4′41.19″E

Korberoth was a small village near Frankenblick, in the Sonneberg district of Thuringia, Germany.

The village was first documented in 1334 as Cubenrode. In 1910, the village had a population of 21. The village was located near the Inner German border and was thus, for exaggerated border security measures, completely destroyed in 1984 after the residents were forcibly relocated in 1970. After the border opened and the no man's land was accessible again in 1989 (Peaceful Revolution and German reunification), a memorial stone was erected in 1991 were the seven houses stood before destruction. An annual service in september commemorates the events.

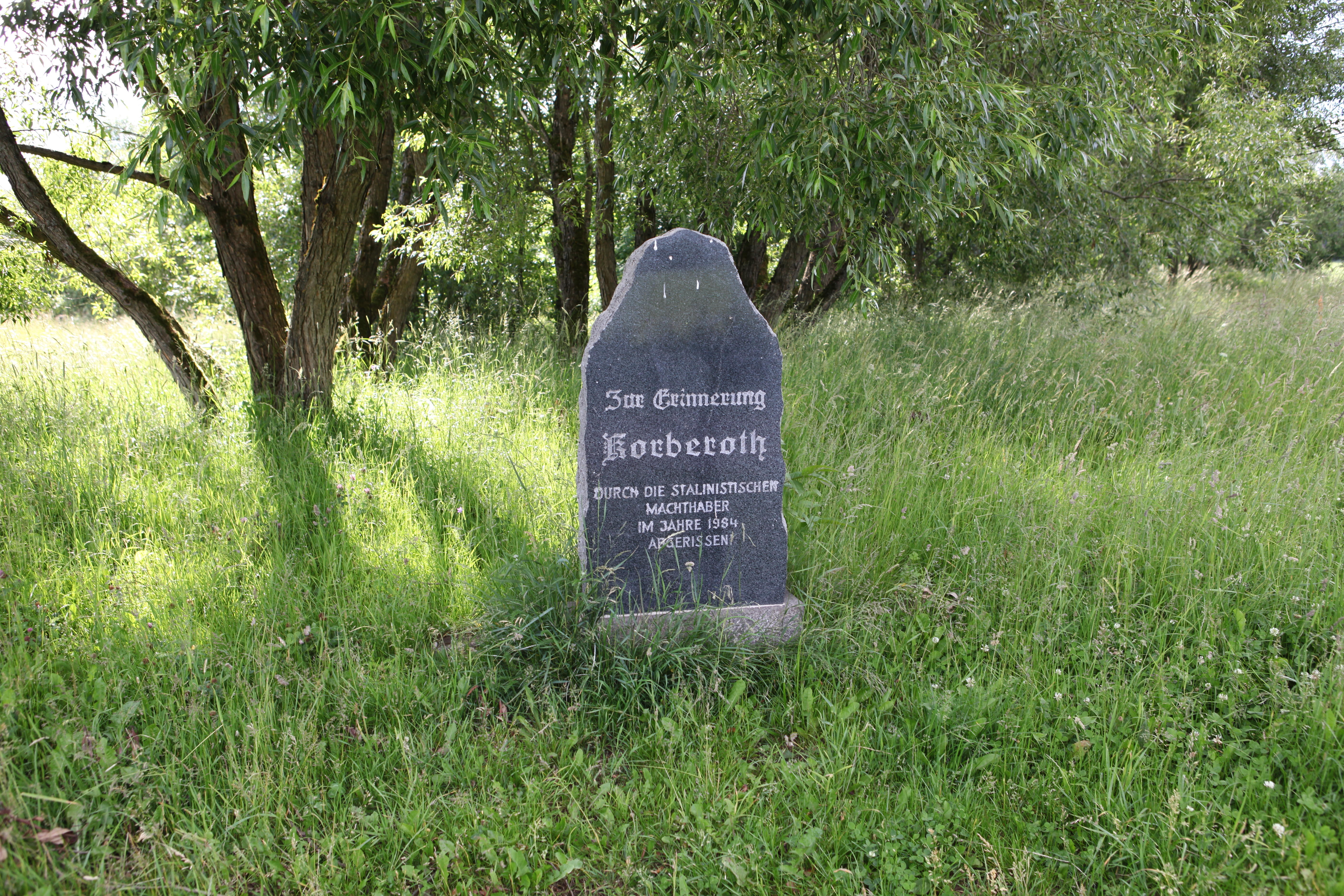
"Zur Erinnerung: Koberoth. Durch die stalinistischen Machthaber im Jahre 1984 abgerissen." "In remembrance: Koberoth. Destroyed by the stalinistic leaders in 1984."

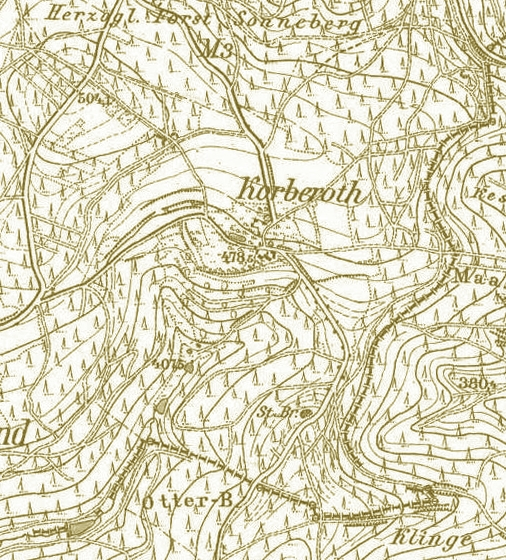
A map from 1880
