= Itz =

River in Germany

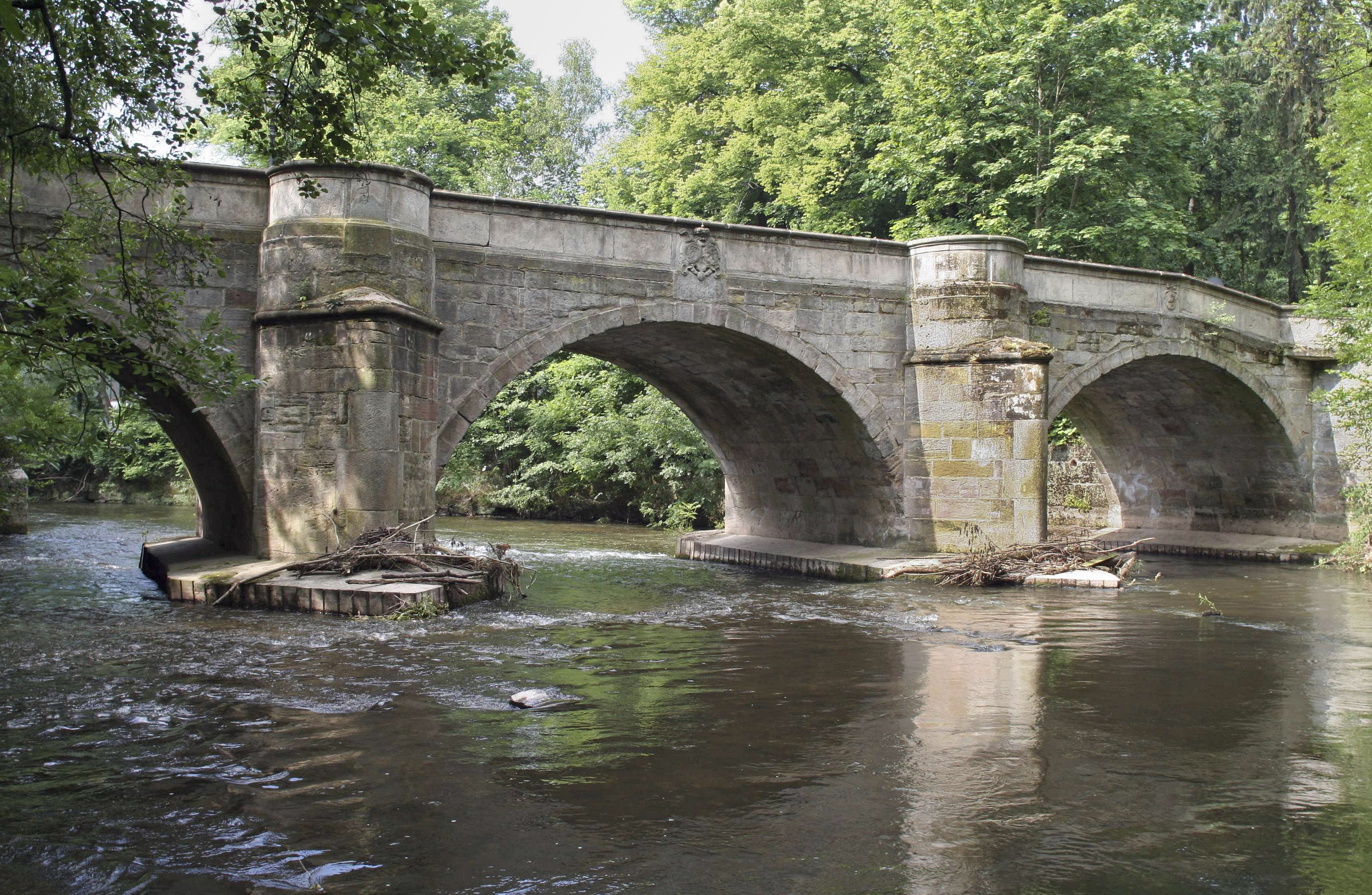
- The Jews' Bridge (German: Judenbrücke) crosses the Itz in Coburg

Location
- Country: Germany
- States: Thuringia; Bavaria

Physical characteristics
- Source
  - location: in the Thuringian Forest near Sachsenbrunn
  - elevation: 673 m (2,208 ft)
- Mouth
  - location: Main southeast of Baunach
  - coordinates: 49°58′59″N 10°52′5″E
  - elevation: 259 m (850 ft)
- Length: 79.1 km (49.2 mi)
- Basin size: 1,031 km^{2} (398 sq mi)
- Discharge
  - average: 9.29 m^{3}/s (328 cu ft/s)

Basin features
- Progression: Main→ Rhine→ North Sea

The Itz (German pronunciation: [ɪts]) is a river of Thuringia and Bavaria, Germany.

The Itz is 79-kilometre (49 mi) long and a right tributary of the Main.

The Itz begins in Sachsenbrunn (Stelzen), Thuringia, and flows southward through Bachfeld and Schalkau. It crosses into Bavaria and feeds the Froschgrundsee reservoir. It continues through Dörfles-Esbach, Coburg, and Großheirath, then is joined by the Rodach north of Itzgrund. It continues southward to Rattelsdorf and Baunach, where it joins the Main.

The Itz flooded Coburg in early 2003.

== See also ==
- List of rivers of Thuringia
- List of rivers of Bavaria
