= Liebau (Thuringia) =

Former village in Thuringia, Germany

Liebau was a village near Föritztal, Thuringia, located at the state's border to Bavaria. After Liebau lost practically all of its population due to two waves of Republikflucht, the village was completely destroyed by East German authorities in 1975.

Liebau was first documented in 1317 as Tybowe, which derives from the Slavic root dyb. For centuries there was a manor in the village, which was abolished in 1847. In 1910, Liebau had a population of 68. The local economy was characterized by craftsmanship and agriculture. It was not until 1826 that the village, which was parished to Mupperg (today Sonneberg), became part of the Sonneberg district. Previously, for a long time, the village was under the administration of Neustadt bei Coburg and Hassenberg (today part of Sonnefeld), both in Bavaria. This turned out to be a problem by 1945, as all connecting roads now went through the American Occupation Zone and (after 1949) the Federal Republic of Germany (West Germany) and the village itself was in the Russian Occupation Zone and later the German Democratic Republic (East Germany). In 1952, there were discussions between the Russians and the Americans about a potential exchange of territory (eg. Letting Liebau be a part of Bavaria in exchange of another village), but the discussions failed or were given up. The situation further worsened when the GDR, for excessive border security reasons, established a 10-Meter wide exclusion zone. This situation and indications of a planned forced resettlement (as later happened in Korberoth for example) led to almost the entire population fleeing together to West Germany on 5 June 1952, leaving only three elderly residents behind.

The GDR authorities attempted to improve the infrastructure in Liebau with a literal (re-)settlement programme, the establishment of a Landwirtschaftliche Produktionsgenossenschaft and the construction of a connecting road to Oerlsdorf (today part of Föritztal). There were even several new buildings such as stables and a cultural centre. However, this did little to alleviate the oppressive situation on the inner-German border. The tightening of the border policies in 1961 led to further forced resettlements in the border area. Many of the newly resettled people had already left Liebau for Bavaria (as in 1952 the original residents did) or returned to their old home. The last few inhabitants were forcibly resettled in 1975 and the entire village was razed to the ground. Today, no traces of the village's history can be found on the site, except for a memorial stone.

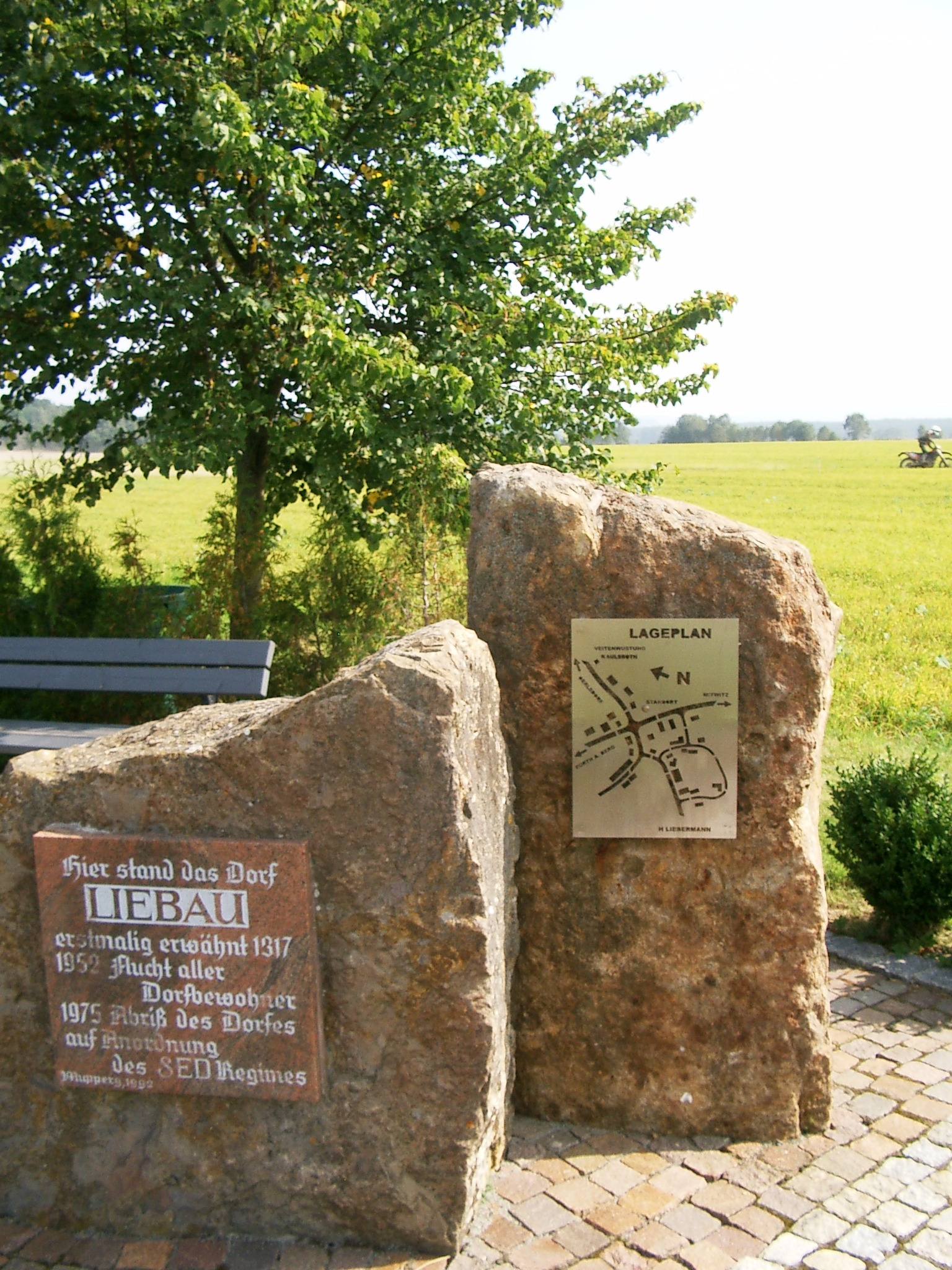
Remembering Liebau

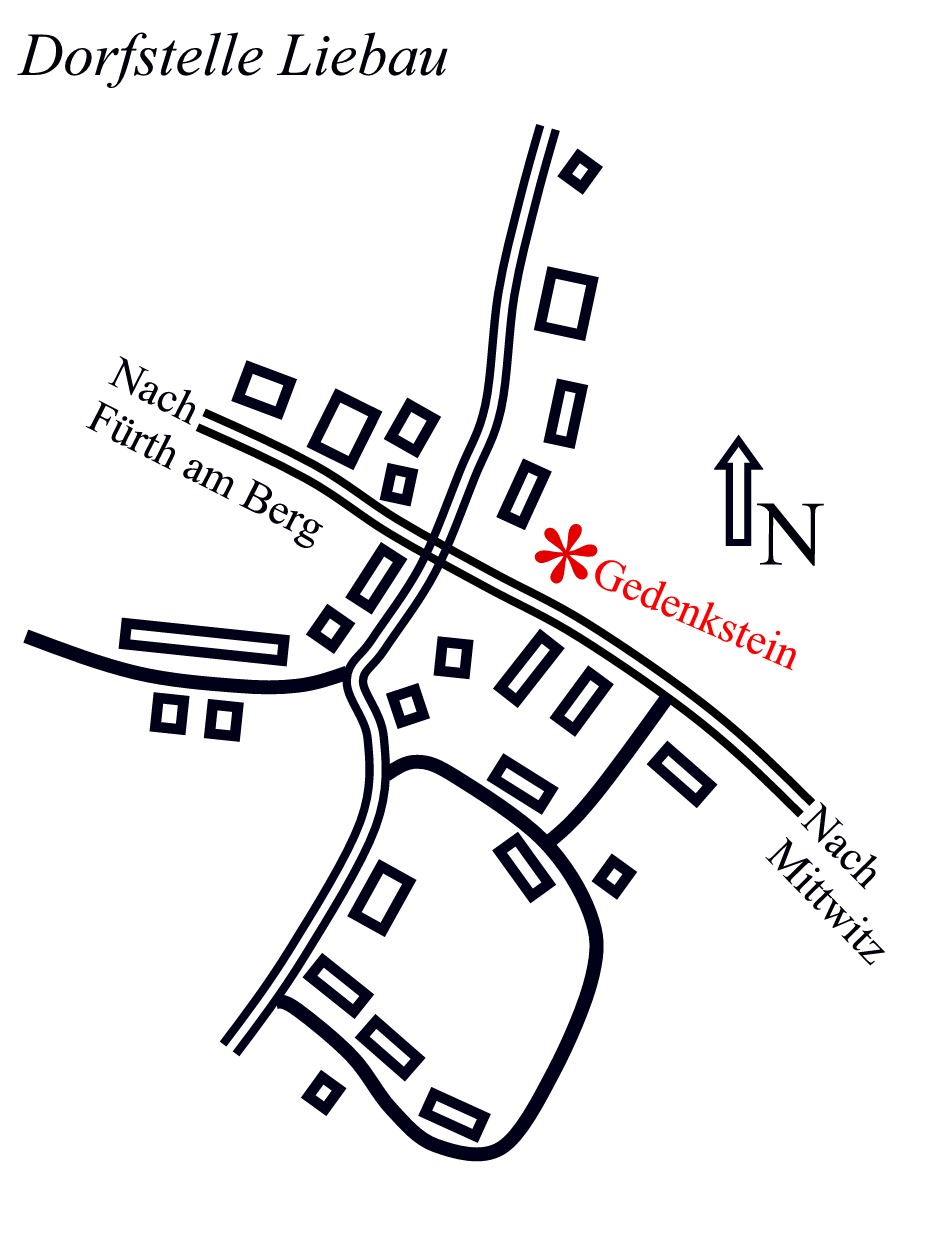
Where the houses once stood. The red mark denotes the memorial's location.
