= Sachsenbrunn =

- Ortsteil of Eisfeld
- Coat of arms
- Interactive map of Sachsenbrunn
- Location within Germany Location within Thuringia
- Coordinates: 50°27′N 10°58′E
- Country: Germany
- State: Thuringia
- District: Hildburghausen
- Town: Eisfeld

Area
  - Total: 33.86 km^{2} (13.07 sq mi)
- Elevation: 480 m (1,570 ft)

Population (2017-12-31)
  - Total: 2,050
  - Density: 60.5/km^{2} (157/sq mi)
- Time zone: UTC+01:00 (CET)
  - Summer (DST): UTC+02:00 (CEST)
- Postal codes: 98673
- Dialling codes: 03686

Sachsenbrunn (German pronunciation: [ˈzaksn̩ˌbʁʊn]) is a village and a former municipality in the district of Hildburghausen, in Thuringia, Germany. It includes the community of Stelzen. Since 1 January 2019, it is part of the town Eisfeld.

== Culture ==
A notable cultural item in the village of Sachsenbrunn is its Tanzlinde, a lime tree that has had a dancing platform built around it. It is one of the best preserved examples of this in Germany.

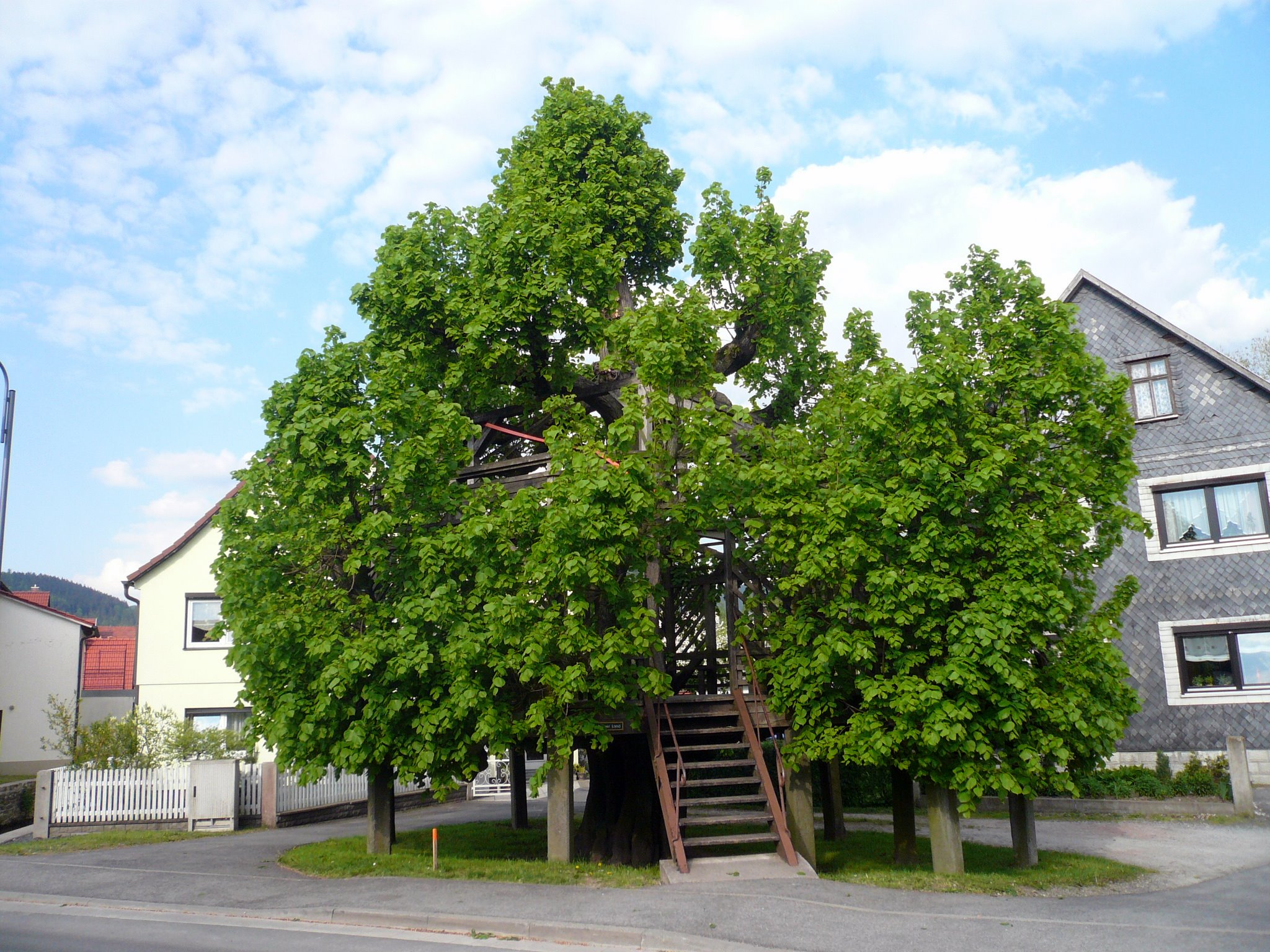
Tanzlinde in Sachsendorf
