= Bachfeld =

- Ortsteil of Schalkau
- Coat of arms
- Interactive map of Bachfeld
- Location within Germany Location within Thuringia
- Coordinates: 50°24′30″N 10°58′50″E
- Country: Germany
- State: Thuringia
- District: Sonneberg
- Town: Schalkau

Area
  - Total: 10.46 km^{2} (4.04 sq mi)
- Elevation: 415 m (1,362 ft)

Population (2018-12-31)
  - Total: 438
  - Density: 41.9/km^{2} (108/sq mi)
- Time zone: UTC+01:00 (CET)
  - Summer (DST): UTC+02:00 (CEST)
- Postal codes: 96528
- Dialling codes: 036766
- Vehicle registration: SON, NH

Bachfeld (German pronunciation: [ˈbaxfɛlt]) is a village and a former municipality in the Sonneberg district of Thuringia, Germany. Since December 2019, it is part of the town Schalkau.
