= Effelder-Rauenstein =

- Ortsteil of Frankenblick
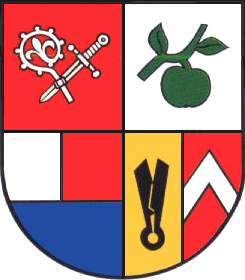
- Coat of arms
- Interactive map of Effelder-Rauenstein
- Location within Germany Location within Thuringia
- Coordinates: 50°22′N 11°4′E
- Country: Germany
- State: Thuringia
- District: Sonneberg
- Municipality: Frankenblick

Area
  - Total: 41.73 km^{2} (16.11 sq mi)
- Elevation: 395 m (1,296 ft)

Population (2010-12-31)
  - Total: 3,692
  - Density: 88.47/km^{2} (229.1/sq mi)
- Time zone: UTC+01:00 (CET)
  - Summer (DST): UTC+02:00 (CEST)
- Postal codes: 96528
- Dialling codes: 036766
- Vehicle registration: SON
- Website: www.effelder- rauenstein.de

Effelder-Rauenstein is a former municipality in the Sonneberg district of Thuringia, Germany. Since 1 January 2012, it is part of the municipality Frankenblick.
