= Mengersgereuth-Hämmern =

- Ortsteil of Frankenblick
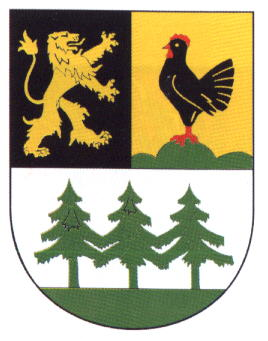
- Coat of arms
- Interactive map of Mengersgereuth-Hämmern
- Location within Germany Location within Thuringia
- Coordinates: 50°23′N 11°7′E
- Country: Germany
- State: Thuringia
- District: Sonneberg
- Municipality: Frankenblick

Area
  - Total: 18.94 km^{2} (7.31 sq mi)
- Elevation: 500 m (1,600 ft)

Population (2010-12-31)
  - Total: 2,724
  - Density: 143.8/km^{2} (372.5/sq mi)
- Time zone: UTC+01:00 (CET)
  - Summer (DST): UTC+02:00 (CEST)
- Postal codes: 96529
- Dialling codes: 03675
- Vehicle registration: SON
- Website: www.mengersgereuth.de

Mengersgereuth-Hämmern is a former municipality in the Sonneberg district of Thuringia, Germany. Since 1 January 2012, it is part of the municipality Frankenblick.
