= Itzgrund =

- Municipality
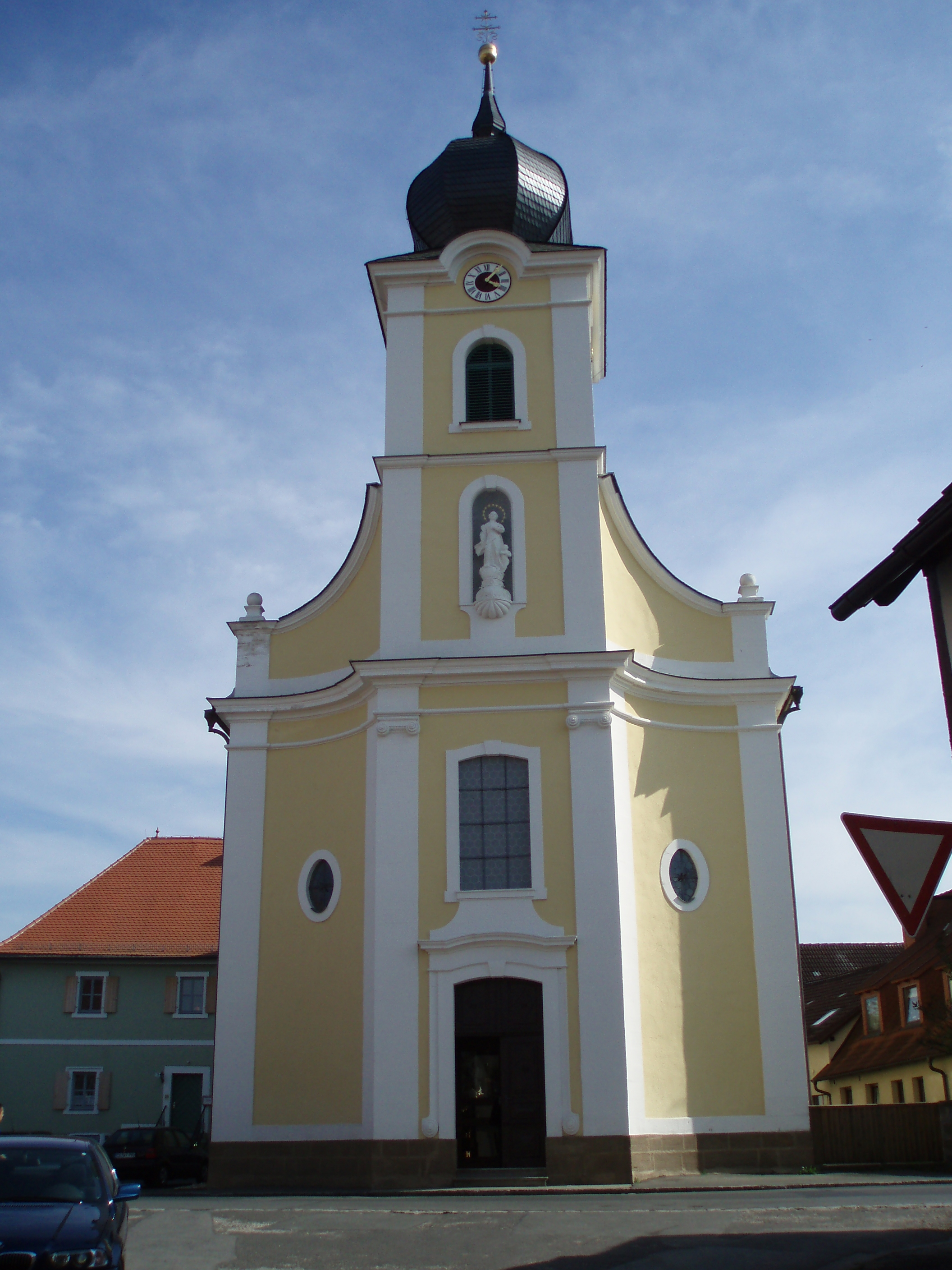
- Saint Wolfgang Church in Kaltenbrunn

- Coat of arms

- Location of Itzgrund within Coburg district
- Interactive map of Itzgrund
- Location within Germany Location within Bavaria
- Coordinates: 50°07′N 10°54′E
- Country: Germany
- State: Bavaria
- Admin. region: Oberfranken
- District: Coburg
- Subdivisions: 6 Ortsteile

Government
  - Mayor (2020–26): Nina Liebermann (CSU)

Area
  - Total: 33.08 km^{2} (12.77 sq mi)
- Elevation: 250–450 m (820–1,480 ft)

Population (2025-12-31)
  - Total: 2,313
  - Density: 69.92/km^{2} (181.1/sq mi)
- Time zone: UTC+01:00 (CET)
  - Summer (DST): UTC+02:00 (CEST)
- Postal codes: 96274
- Dialling codes: 09533 teilw. 09573
- Vehicle registration: CO
- Website: www.itzgrund.de

Itzgrund (valley of the Itz) is a municipality in the district of Coburg in Bavaria in Germany.
