= Schalkau =

- Town
- Coat of arms

- Location of Schalkau within Sonneberg district
- Interactive map of Schalkau
- Location within Germany Location within Thuringia
- Coordinates: 50°23′40″N 11°0′31″E
- Country: Germany
- State: Thuringia
- District: Sonneberg

Government
  - Mayor (2024–30): Mark Schwimmer (Ind.)

Area
  - Total: 44.02 km^{2} (17.00 sq mi)
- Elevation: 400 m (1,300 ft)

Population (2025-12-31)
  - Total: 3,111
  - Density: 70.67/km^{2} (183.0/sq mi)
- Time zone: UTC+01:00 (CET)
  - Summer (DST): UTC+02:00 (CEST)
- Postal codes: 96528
- Dialling codes: 036766
- Vehicle registration: SON, NH
- Website: www.schalkau.de

Schalkau (German pronunciation: [ˈʃalkaʊ]) is a town in the district of Sonneberg, in Thuringia, Germany. It is situated 13 km west of Sonneberg, and 15 km north of Coburg. The former municipality Bachfeld was merged into Schalkau in December 2019.

== History ==
From 1680 to 1920, Schalkau was part of Saxe-Meiningen, from 1920 to 1952 of the State of Thuringia, from 1952 to 1990 of the Bezirk Suhl of East Germany and since 1990 again of Thuringia.

== Transportation ==
Schalkau has two train stations, Schalkau and Schalkau Mitte, on the Hinterland Railway (Hinterlandbahn) from Sonneberg Hauptbahnhof to Eisfeld. There is also a regular bus service to Sonneberg.

== Education ==
There is one secondary school, educating pupils 11-16 (ordinarily) which falls into the 'Realschule' category. The school is named after the famous German writer, Goethe. There is a post office and a few other facilities.

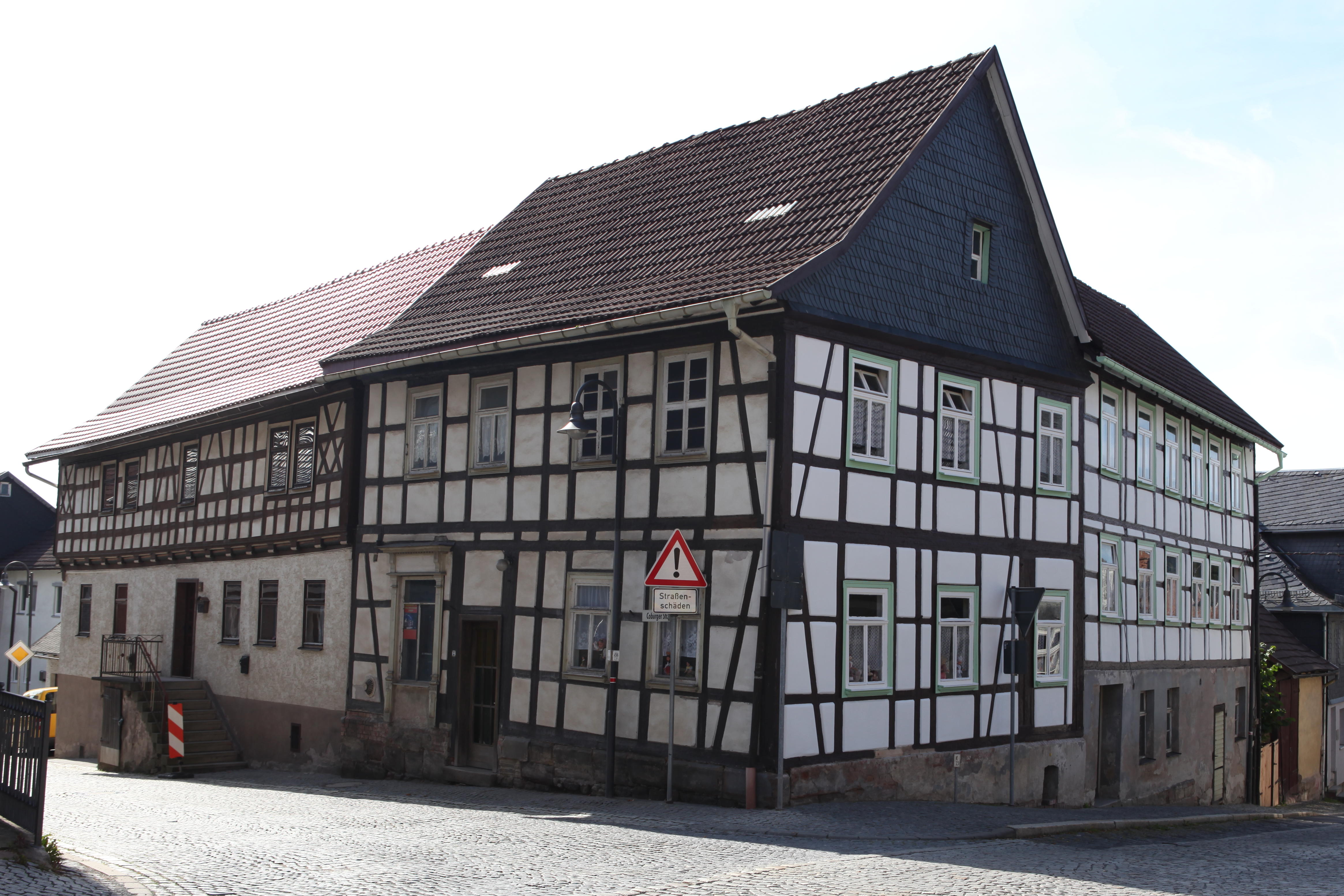
Schalkau

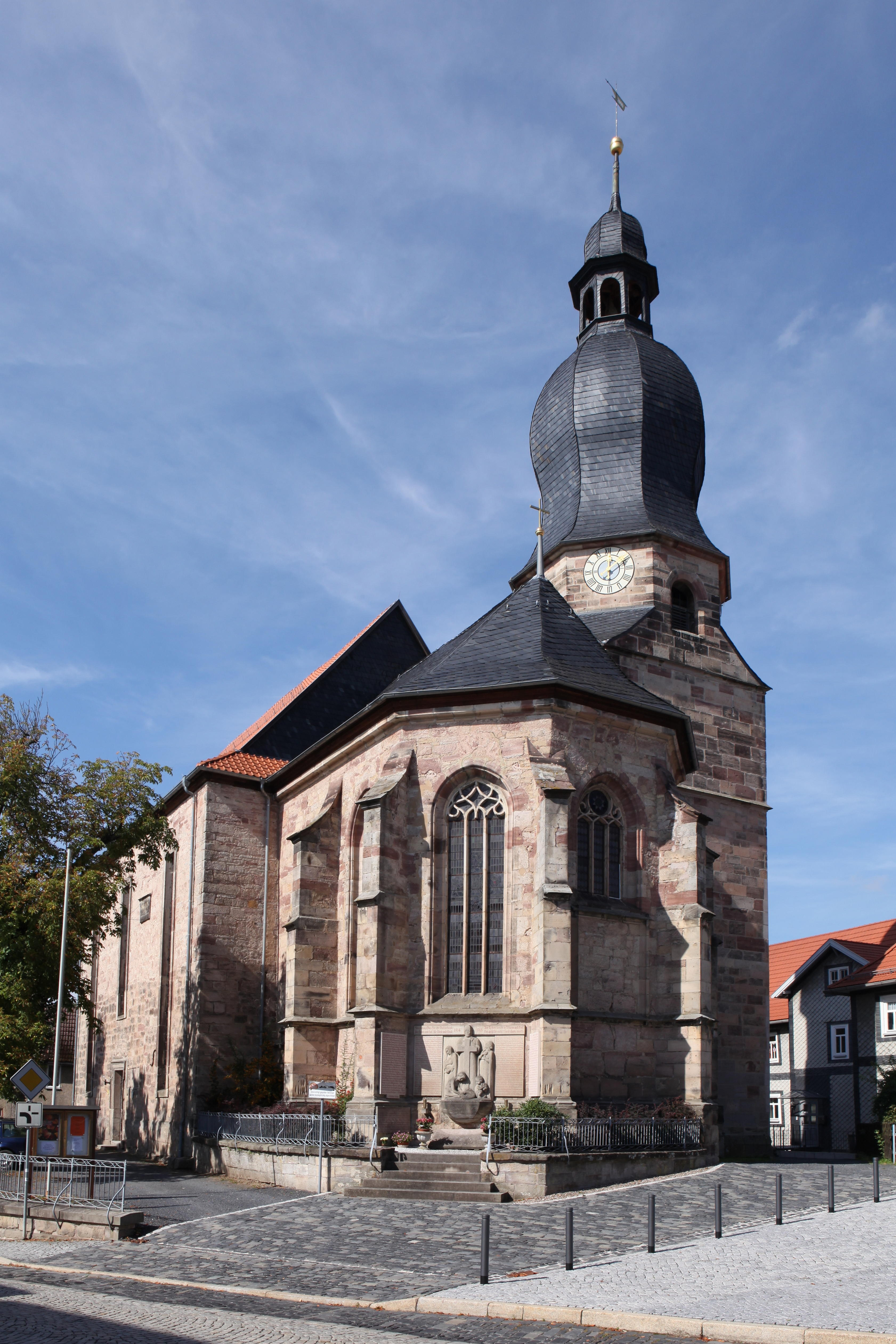
St. Johannis Lutheran church

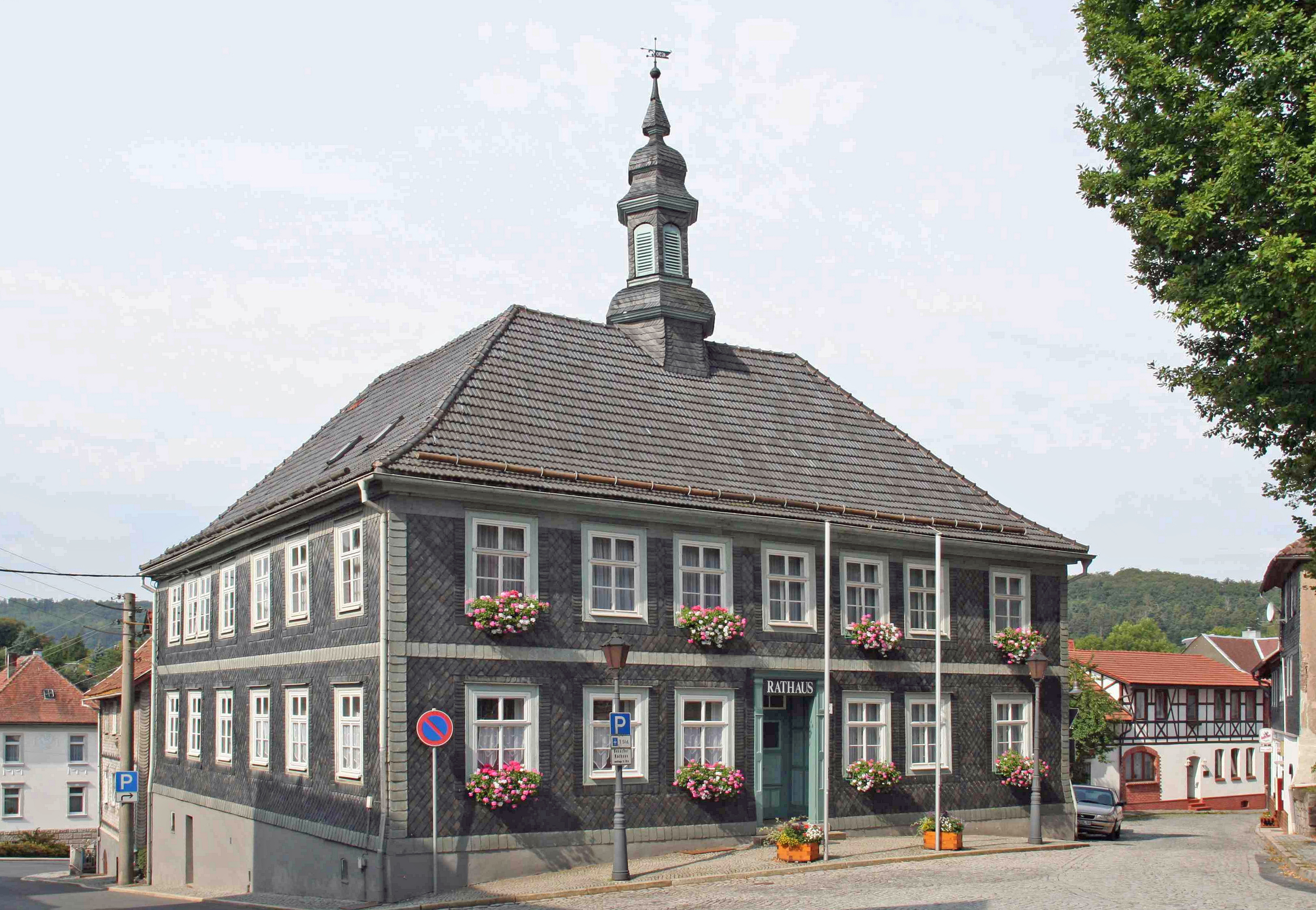
Schalkau Town hall

== Town division ==
The town has 10 districts:

- Almerswind with Selsendorf
- Bachfeld with Gundelswind
- Ehnes
- Emstadt with Truckendorf and Görsdorf
- Katzberg
- Mausendorf with Neundorf
- Roth
- Schalkau
- Theuern
- Truckenthal

== Inhabitants ==
Number of inhabitants (as of 31 December):

- 1994: 3765
- 1996: 3689
- 1998: 3689
- 2000: 3498
- 2002: 3463
- 2004: 3417
- 2006: 3338
- 2008: 3286
- 2010: 3202
- 2012: 3049
- 2014: 2980
- 2015: 2982

Source since 1994: Thuringia statistical office Erfurt

== Personalities ==
- Jan Eichhorn (born 1981), luger
- Maximilian Mörlin (1516–1584), Protestant theologian and reformer
- David Möller (born 1982), luger
- Fritz Mueller (1907–2001), aerospace engineer
