= Frankenblick =

- Municipality
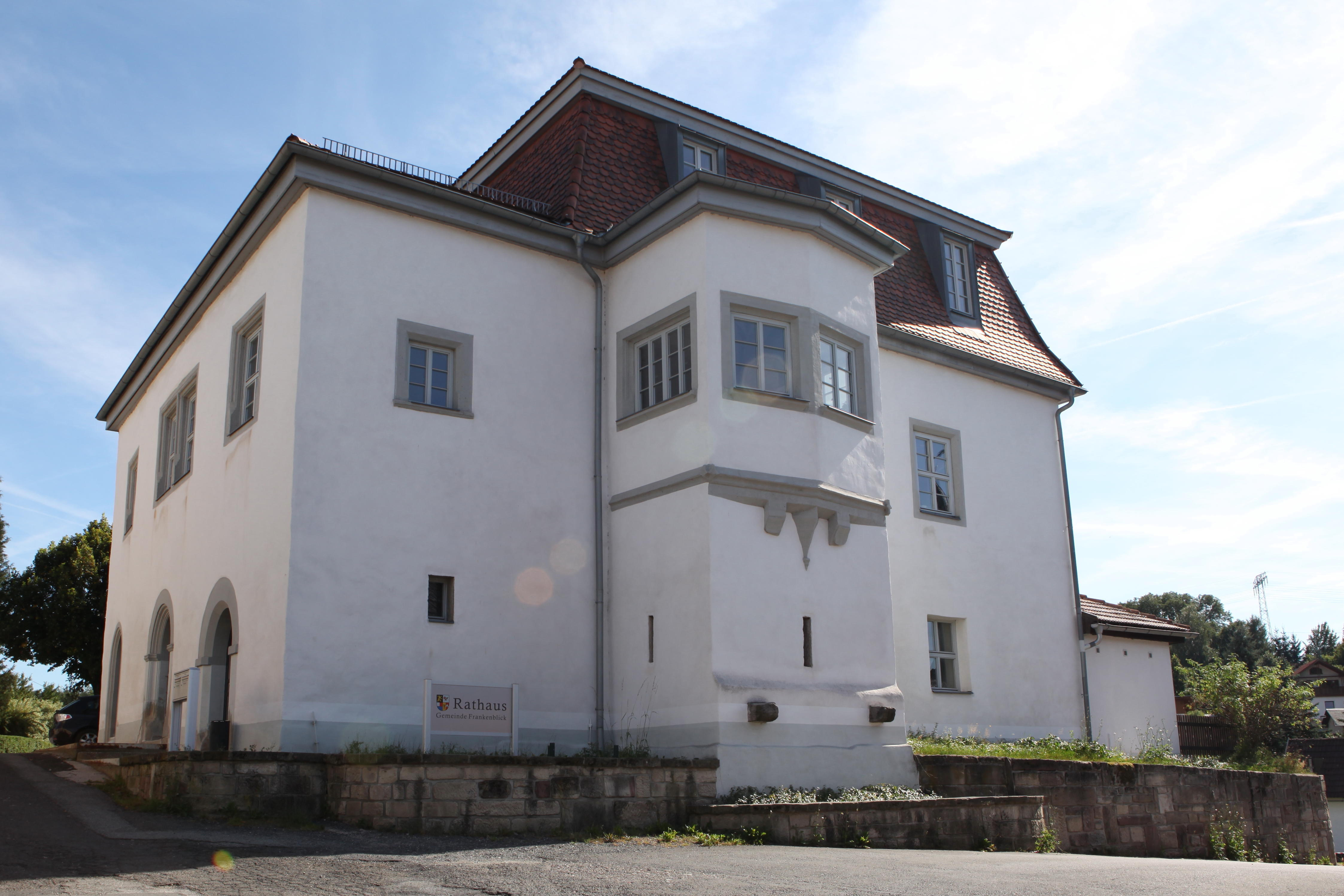
- Town hall

- Coat of arms

- Location of Frankenblick within Sonneberg district
- Interactive map of Frankenblick
- Location within Germany Location within Thuringia
- Coordinates: 50°22′N 11°4′E
- Country: Germany
- State: Thuringia
- District: Sonneberg

Government
  - Mayor (2019–25): Ute Müller-Gothe (CDU)

Area
  - Total: 60.65 km^{2} (23.42 sq mi)
- Elevation: 395 m (1,296 ft)

Population (2025-12-31)
  - Total: 5,434
  - Density: 89.60/km^{2} (232.1/sq mi)
- Time zone: UTC+01:00 (CET)
  - Summer (DST): UTC+02:00 (CEST)
- Postal codes: 96528
- Dialling codes: 03675, 036766
- Vehicle registration: SON, NH
- Website: www.frankenblick.eu

Frankenblick (German pronunciation: [ˈfʁaŋkn̩ˌblɪk]) is a municipality in the Sonneberg district of Thuringia, Germany.

Frankenblick was formed on 1 January 2012 by the merger of the former municipalities Effelder-Rauenstein and Mengersgereuth-Hämmern. Today, it consists of the districts Effelder, Rauenstein, Grümpen, Seltendorf, Rabenäußig, Rückerswind, Meschenbach, Döhlau and Mengersgereuth-Hämmern.

== Gallery ==
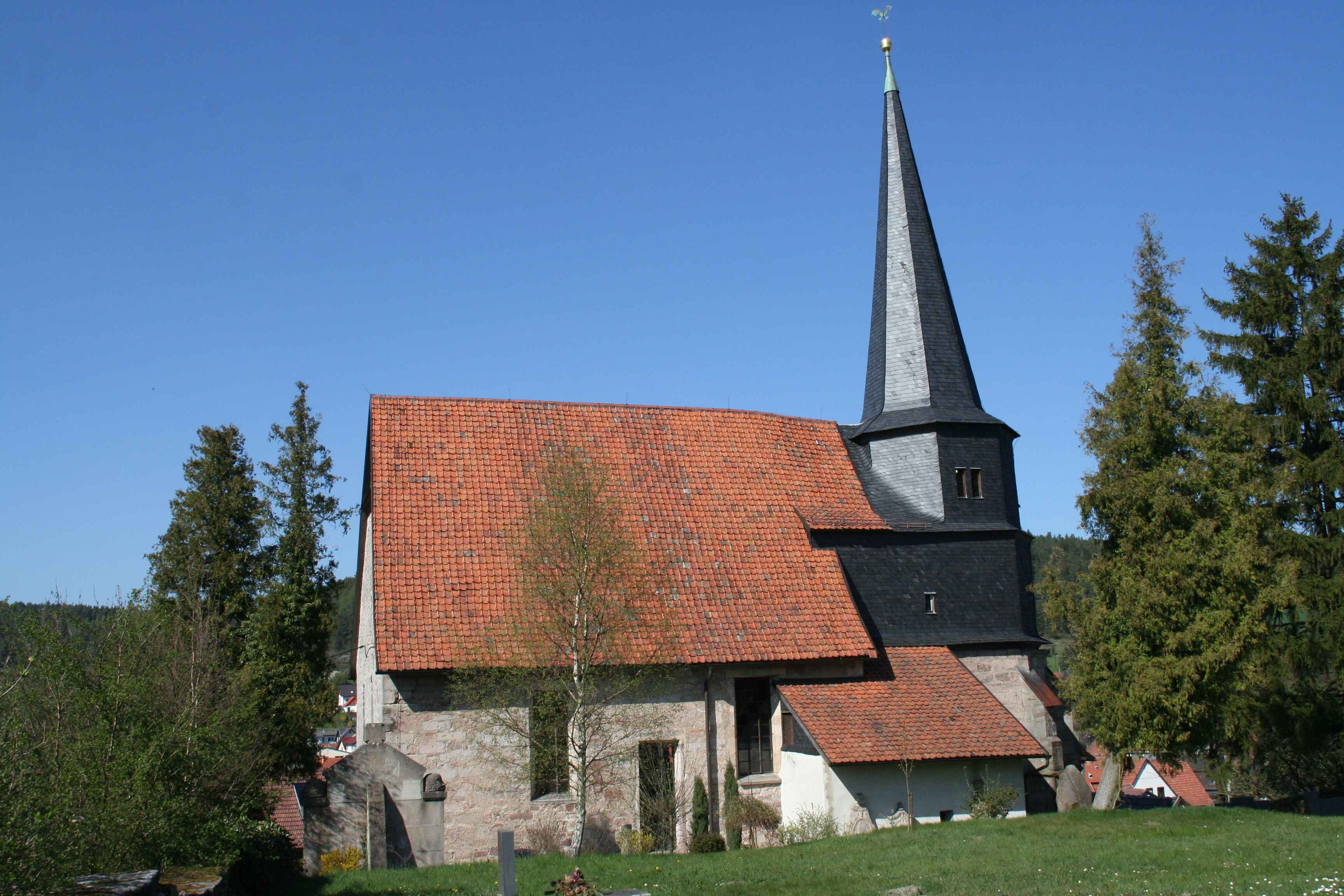
Effelder church

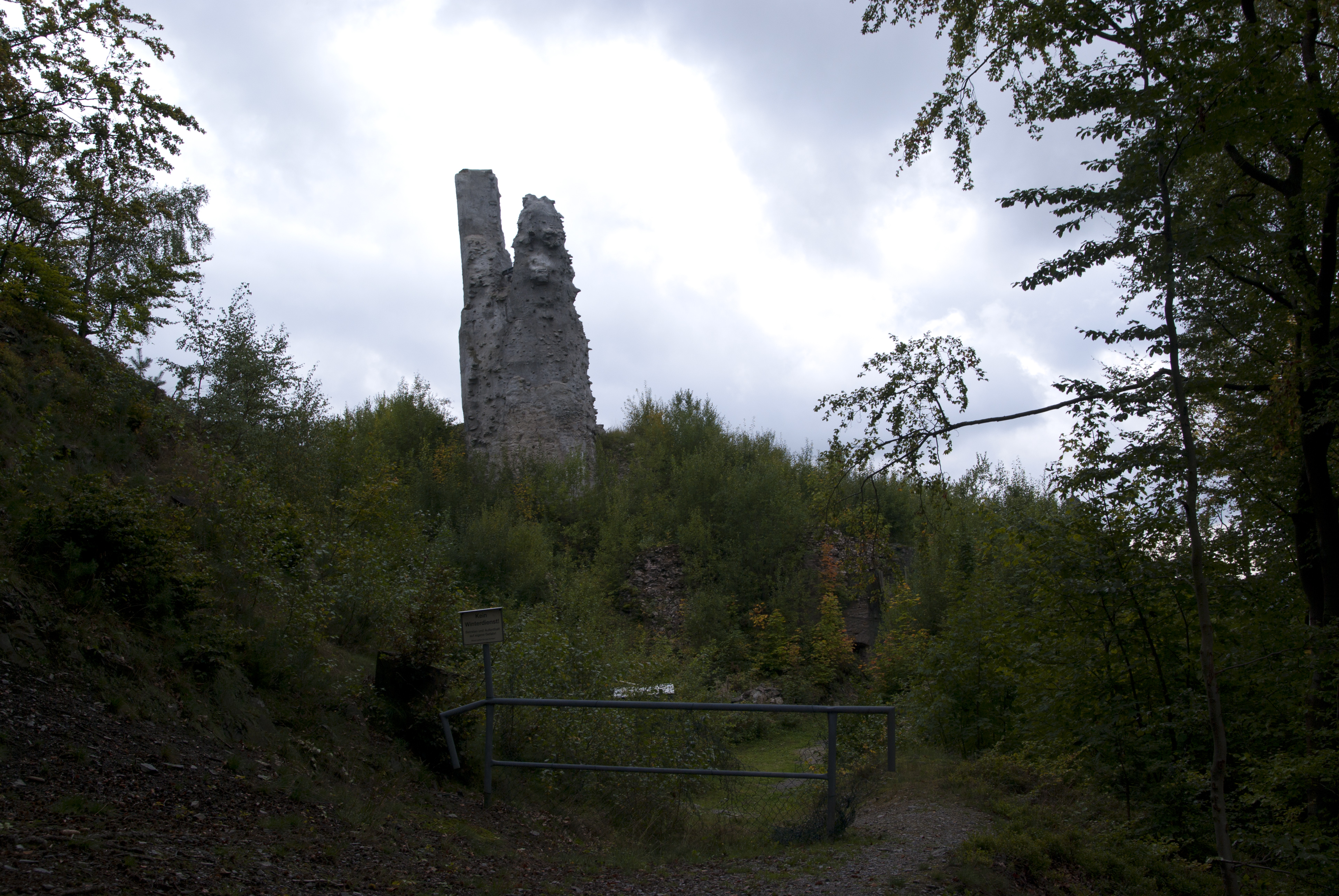
Rauenstein ruin

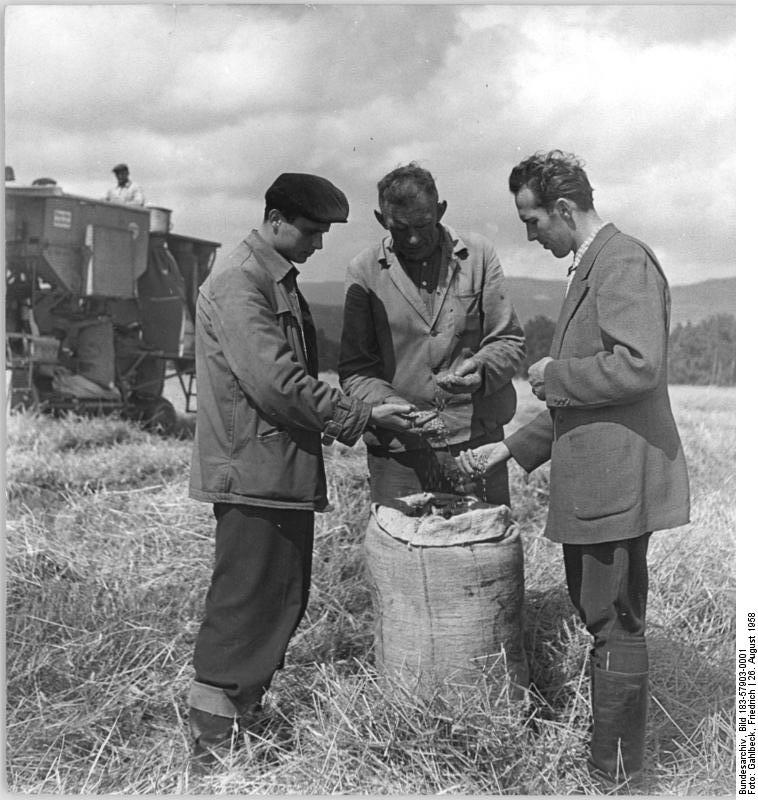
Fritz Müller (centre), chairman of the Landwirtschaftliche Produktionsgenossenschaft Seltendorf with MTS-Brigadier Georg Stenzel (left) and agricultural engineer Karl Reichenbacher, August 1958.
