= Rödental =

- Town
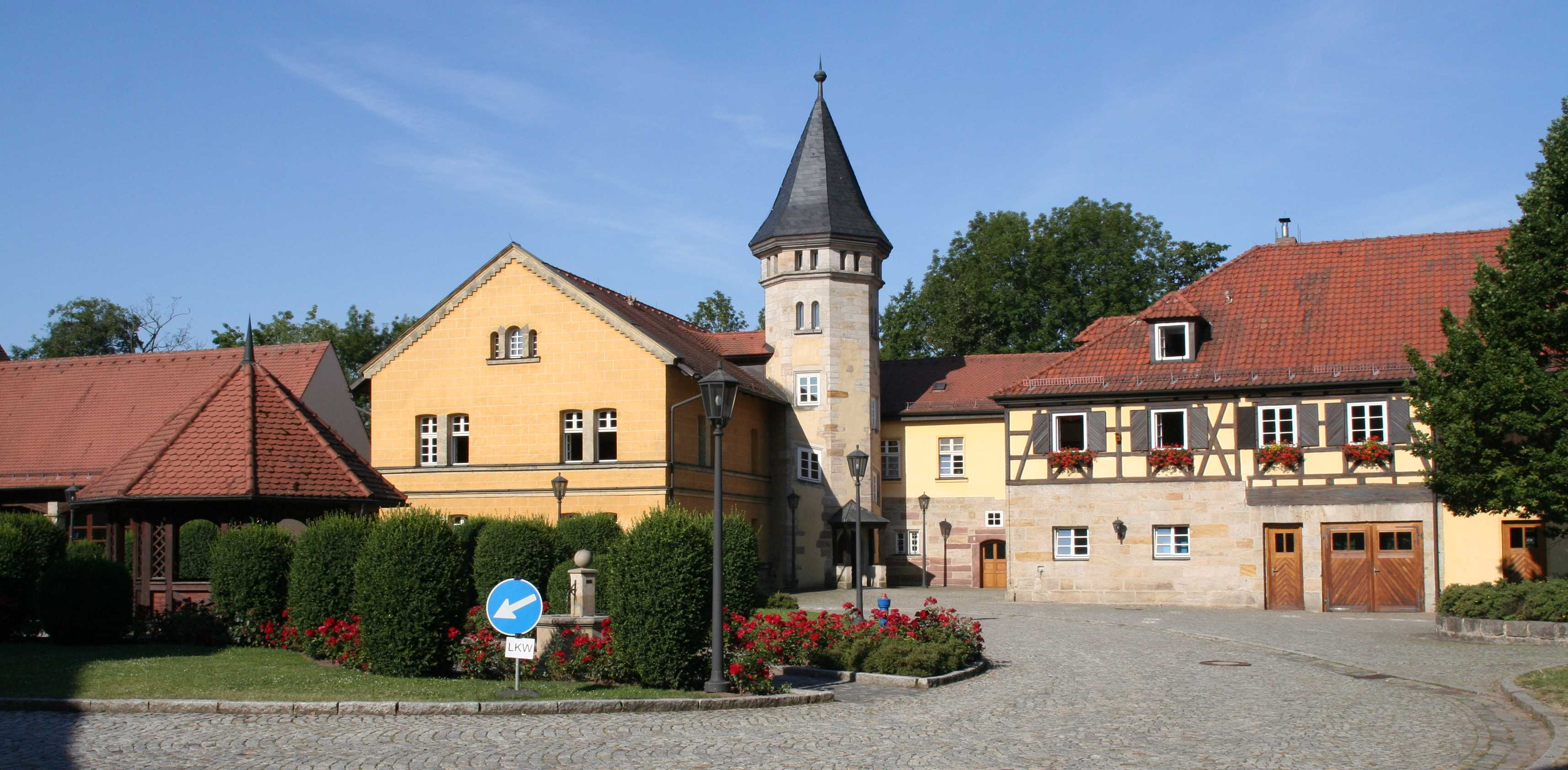
- Central part of Oeslau

- Coat of arms

- Location of Rödental within Coburg district
- Interactive map of Rödental
- Location within Germany Location within Bavaria
- Coordinates: 50°17′N 11°4′E
- Country: Germany
- State: Bavaria
- Admin. region: Oberfranken
- District: Coburg
- Subdivisions: 16 Stadtteile

Government
  - Mayor (2020–26): Marco Steiner (FW)

Area
  - Total: 49.97 km^{2} (19.29 sq mi)
- Elevation: 350 m (1,150 ft)

Population (2025-12-31)
  - Total: 12,329
  - Density: 246.7/km^{2} (639.0/sq mi)
- Time zone: UTC+01:00 (CET)
  - Summer (DST): UTC+02:00 (CEST)
- Postal codes: 96472
- Dialling codes: 09563
- Vehicle registration: CO
- Website: www.roedental.de

Rödental (German: [ˈʁøːdn̩ˌtaːl], lit. 'Röden Valley') is a town in the district of Coburg, northern Bavaria, Germany, 7 km northeast of Coburg.

Rödental was the name given to a group of municipalities that united 1971, including Mönchröden, Oeslau, Einberg, Oberwohlsbach and Unterwohlsbach.

The oldest part of Rödental is Mönchröden, founded in 1108. Mönchröden (meaning monks along the river Röden) has a 900-year-old monastery that is in well preserved condition, and contains several Gothic structures.

Oeslau, the largest of the components of Rödental, is the home of the W. Goebel Porzellanfabrik porcelain factory.

== See also ==
- Schloss Rosenau, Coburg
