= Vesser (river) =

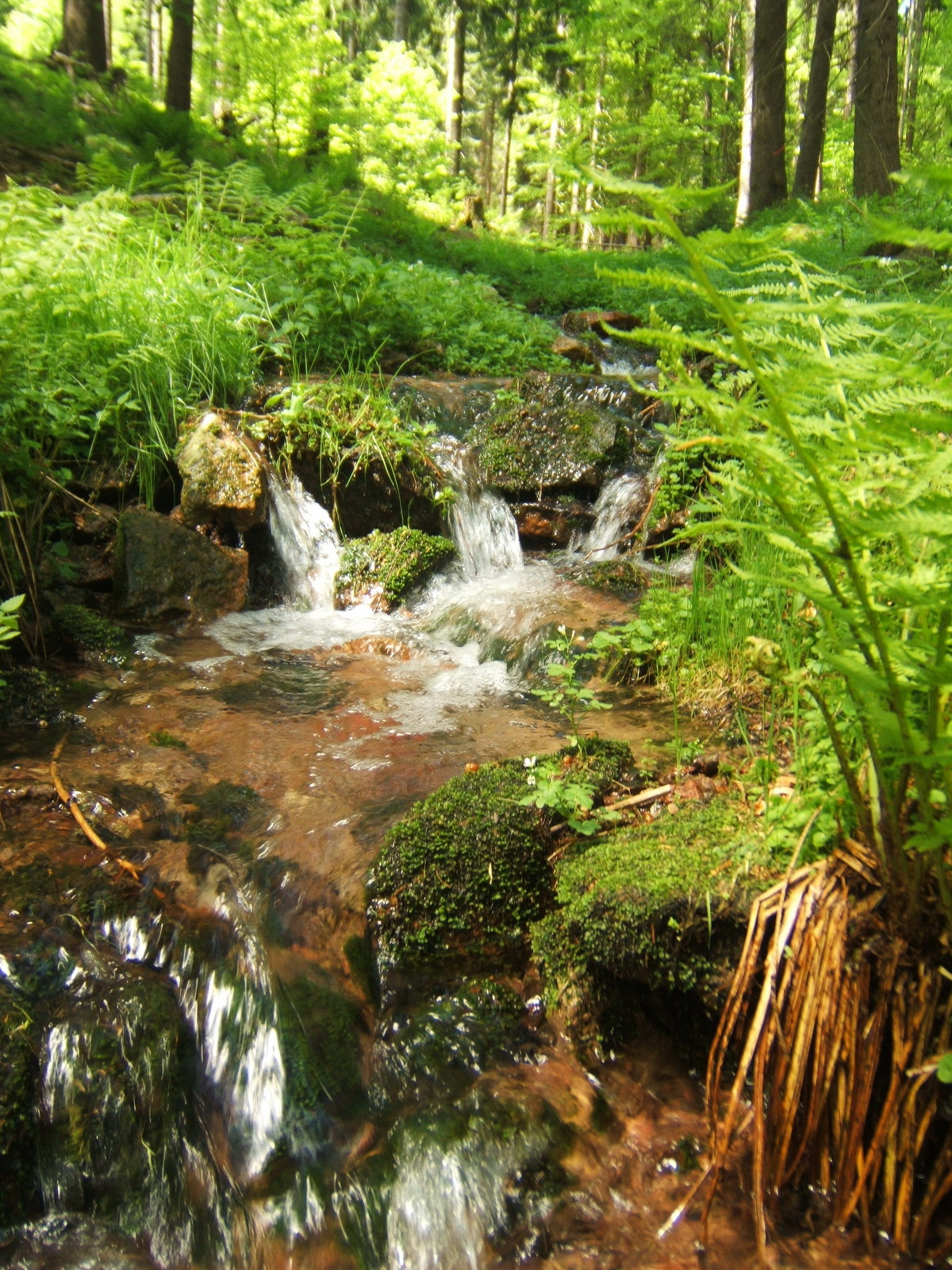

Location
- Country: Germany
- State: Thuringia

Physical characteristics
- Mouth
  - location: Breitenbach
  - coordinates: 50.5417°N 10.7797°E

Basin features
- Progression: Breitenbach→ Erle→ Nahe→ Schleuse→ Werra→ Weser→ North Sea

Vesser is a river of Thuringia, Germany. It flows into the Breitenbach in the village Breitenbach.

The rocks underneath the river are from the Paleozoic.

The Vesser valley (Vessertal) is a rare primeval forest of Germany, set in a nature reserve.

== See also ==
- List of rivers of Thuringia
