= Breitenbach (Erle) =

Location
- Country: Germany
- State: Thuringia

Physical characteristics
- Mouth
  - location: Erle
  - coordinates: 50.5217°N 10.7575°E

Basin features
- Progression: Erle→ Nahe→ Schleuse→ Werra→ Weser→ North Sea

Breitenbach (German pronunciation: [ˈbʁaɪtn̩bax]) is a river of Thuringia, Germany. It is a left tributary of the Erle, which it joins in Sankt Kilian.

== See also ==
- List of rivers of Thuringia
