= Christian Schreiber (philosopher) =

German theologian, philologist, philosopher and poet

- Born: Christian Johann Christoph Schreiber; 15 April 1781; Eisenach
- Died: 15 August 1857 (aged 76); Ostheim
- Occupation: Philosopher

Christian Johann Christoph Schreiber (15 April 1781 – 15 August 1857) was a German theologian, philologist, philosopher, and poet. He was also the Superintendent of the dioceses of Lengsfeld and Dermbach. He was connected in friendship or correspondence to writers and philosophers of his time, and published poetry, sermons, historical and philosophical works.

== Life ==
Schreiber was born in Eisenach, the son of Dorothee née Riedel and Johann Friedrich Schreiber, a geodesist, tax collector in Saxe-Eisenach, and later ship lieutenant. He grew up and was educated in Eisenach. After his confirmation, he attended the Hennebergisches Gymnasium in Schleusingen. At the age of eighteen he enrolled at the University of Jena and studied theology, philosophy and philology. He passed his exam (under cultural philosopher Johann Gottfried Herder), was named Dr. phil., did his doctorate, and then attended the seminary in Eisenach.

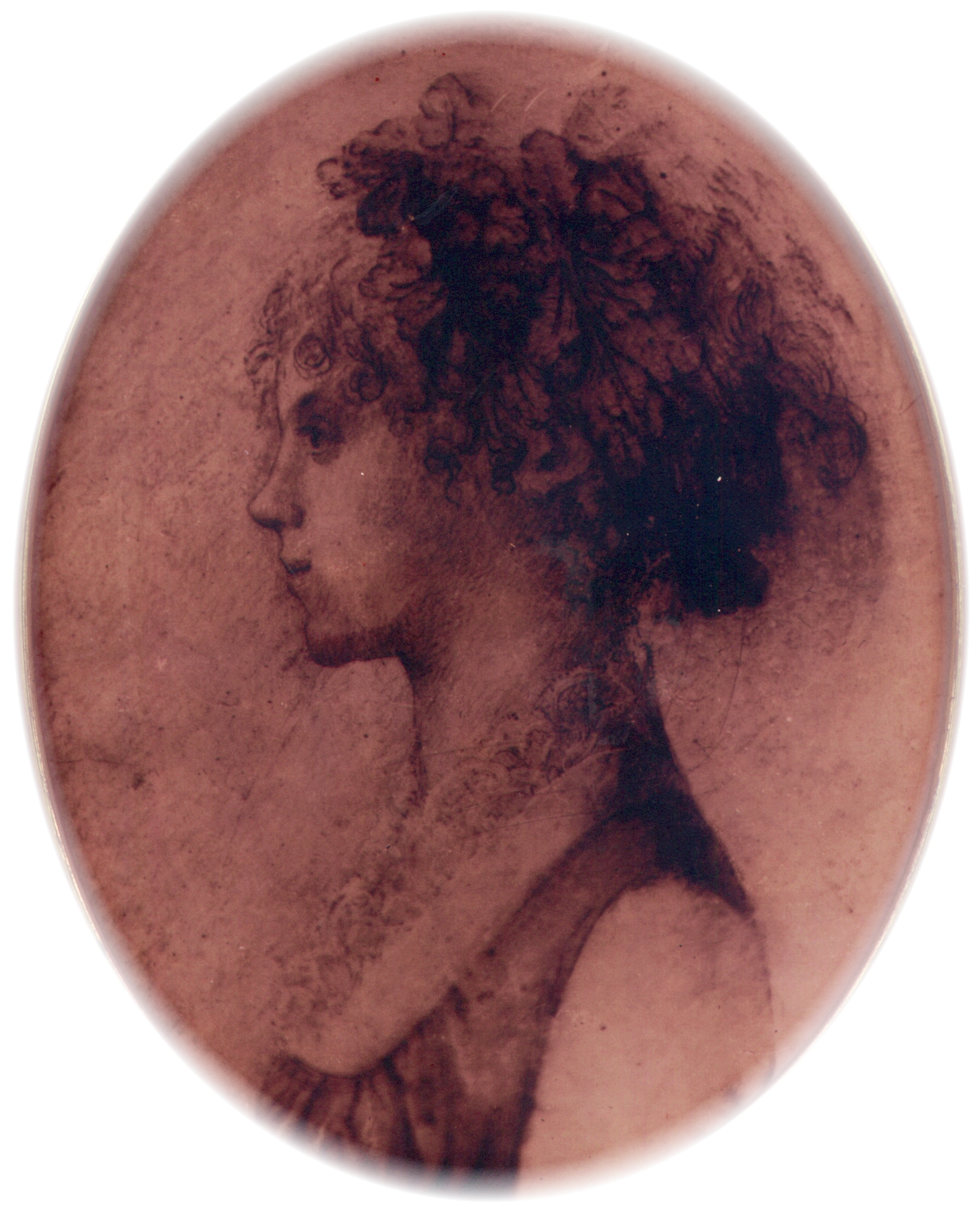
Juliane Schreiber, née Oettelt, Schreiber's wife, 1806 etching

In 1806, his first year as a church official, he married Christiane Juliane Oettelt, the daughter of the Geheimer Fürstlich-Sachsen-Eisenachischer Forstrat Friedrich Wilhelm Oettelt from Eisenach. She died young, and he married in 1813 Sophie Henriette Weitz. He had three children from the two marriages. His descendants include the wife of the President of the Grand Ducal Saxon Regional Court and State Parliament President Julius Appelius and her son Alfred Appelius, who also held the office of President in the State Parliament of Saxe-Weimar-Eisenach.

Schreiber died in Ostheim at age 76.

=== Career ===
Schreiber worked as a tutor for the von Boyneburg family from 1801 to 1803, and published theological tracts as well as lyric and epic poetry. He was encouraged by poets, including Jean Paul, Christoph Martin Wieland, Friedrich Schiller and Friedrich von Matthisson, whom he requested to review his works—with Jean Paul commenting that in places Schreiber clung too closely to the style of Friedrich Schiller.

In 1806, he was called to serve as pastor and member of the consistory in Lengsfeld, Thuringia. He was promoted to Kirchenrat, (church councilor), first for Fulda (Reichsritterschaftlich-Fuldaischer Kirchenrat), then for Kassel (Kurfürstlich-Hessen-Kasseler Kirchenrat) and finally Superintendent in Saxony (Großherzoglich-Sächsischer Superintendent). During his Lengsfeld time, he published theological texts, translations and poems. Topics included Jacques Delille's Dithyrambe about the immortality of the soul, and the Judeneid. He also published sermons and speeches. When Breitkopf & Härtel published Beethoven's Mass in C major from 1809, the publisher requested a German version of the Latin, which Schreiber supplied. It was also used in performance.

Schreiber was connected to leading writers, theologians, philosophers, pedagogues and publishers of his time in friendship or close contact, including Heinrich Karl Eichstädt, Georg Joachim Göschen, Madame de Staël, August Wilhelm Schlegel, Johann Friedrich Cotta. He was in correspondence with many of them, and his letters to Schiller, Goethe, Friedrich Rochlitz, Ferdinand Gotthelf Hand, Georg Karl Friedrich Emmrich and others are held by the Herzogin Anna Amalia Bibliothek.

== Work ==
Though born in the last years of the Age of Enlightenment, Schreiber was a true Romantic, particularly in his lifelong attention to lyricism and music, which manifested itself in his early poetry already, with its leaning on the early Schiller. Though he later went his own way, he nonetheless remained faithful to lyricism.

=== Publications ===
==== As author ====
- Prophetisch-poetische Gemälde der Zukunft. Eine Nachbildung der Offenbarung Johannis. Wilhelm Webel, Zeitz und Naumburg, 1802, Digital link
- Harmonia oder das Reich der Töne. Ein episch-musikalisches Gedicht in 3 Gesängen. Leipzig 1805. Deutsche Nationalbibliothek. (Review in Freimüthiger by Garlieb Helwig Merkel 1805)
- Gedichte. Erster Band. Heinrich Fröhlich, Berlin 1805. Herzogin Anna Amalia BibliothekDigital link.
- Gesänge. Mit Begleitung des Pianoforte. to texts by Julie von Bechtolsheim, Goethe, Siegfried August Mahlmann, Friedrich Rochlitz, Friedrich von Schiller, Schreiber, August Wilhelm Schlegel and others. Breitkopf & Härtel, Leipzig. Newberry Library. (Review in Allgemeine Musikalische Zeitung and Freimüthiger)
- Religion. Ein Gedicht in zwey Gesängen. Carl Steudel, Gotha 1813, Lippe State Library at Detmold. Digital link. (Review in Jenaische Allgemeine Literaturzeitung, 1815 and others)

=== As editor ===
- with Valentin Carl Veillodter and Wilhelm Hennings: Schreiber (1819). Allgemeine Chronik der dritten Jubel – Feier der evangelischen Kirche: Im Jahre 1817 Hennings'sche Buchhandlung, Erfurt und Gotha, Herzogin Anna Amalia Bibliothek (in German).
  - First volume, welcher die Beschreibungen der kirchlichen Feierlichkeiten ... (descriptions of church festivities) Digital link
  - Second volume, welcher die Jubel-Predigten enthält (sermons) Digital link

== Cited sources ==
- Appelius, Peter (1996). Erbslöh, Andreas (ed.). Christian Schreiber / Eisenach / Biographie (in German). Erbslöh.
- Brümmer, Franz (1884). Lexikon der Deutschen Dichter Und Prosaisten von Den Ältesten Zeiten Bis Zum Ende Des 18. Jahrhunderts (in German). Leipzig: Reclam. p. 474.
- Herttrich, Ernst (2010). "Foreword" (PDF). Carus-Verlag. pp. 3–4.
- Justi, Karl Wilhelm [in German]; Strieder, Friedrich Wilhelm (1831). Biographie des Christian Schreiber [Basis for a Hessian scholar, writer and artist story from 1806 to 1830]. Marburg: Garthe. "Fortsetzung von Strieder's Hessischer Gelehrten- u. Schriftsteller-Geschichte und Nachtrag zu diesem Werk"
