= Hennebergisches Gymnasium "Georg Ernst" =

School in Germany

Coordinates: 50.50946°N 10.75430°E

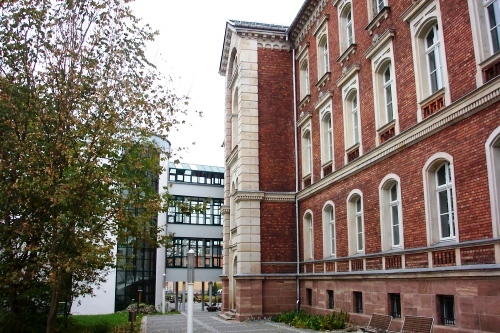

Information
- Established: 1577; 448 years ago

The Hennebergische Gymnasium "Georg Ernst" (HGS) is a public grammar school with Alumnat (boarding school, privately sponsored) in the Thuringian city of Schleusingen. Founded in June 1577 by the Georg Ernst, Earl of Henneberg, it is one of the oldest continuously operated high schools in Germany.

The Gymnasium sees itself as a humanistic school. Since 2002, however, the focus of the education has been in the mathematical-scientific areas.

== History ==
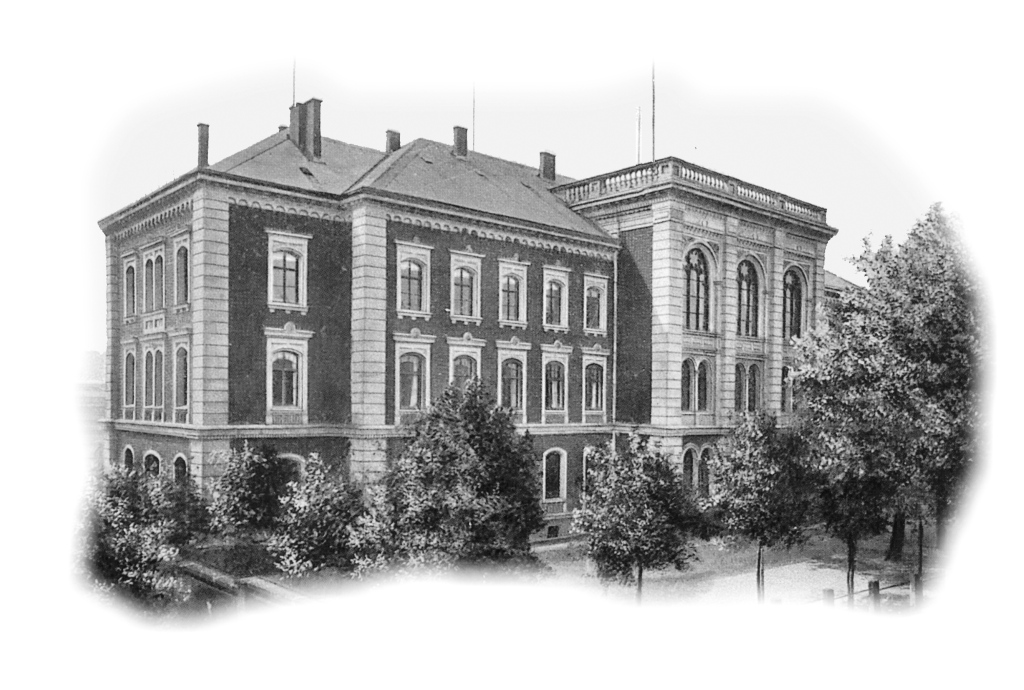
Main Building towards the End of the 19th Century

In 1446, a school under ecclesiastical responsibility was mentioned for the first time in Schleusingen. Both students and teachers had to perform activities on behalf of the city and the church. Since 1502 there is evidence of a Latin school. In 1508, the royal educator Johann Jäger is named the first schoolmaster. After the Reformation, (presumably in 1556) the school relocated to the building of the Barfüsserklosters in the Klosterstrasse, the same location where it can be found today. The last governing Earl of Henneberg, Georg Ernst, issued a school ordinance in 1560, which turned the city school into a royal regional school. He also set a curriculum beginning of June 1569, after which, in addition to the Liberal Arts also the Christian religion should be taught according to the Augsburg Confession. Two exams were to be held each year. In 1577, he founded the Schleusinger Gymnasium from the public Latin School.

Above the entrance to the cellar, in the archway, is the oldest stone of the main building, on which the inscription "illustre Gymn" and the year number 1715 can be seen. In the 16th century, it was customary to refer to a school that taught a complete humanistic course as "illustre". It could correspond to the teaching of the lower faculty of a university.

=== Establishment of the Alumnat (boarding school) ===
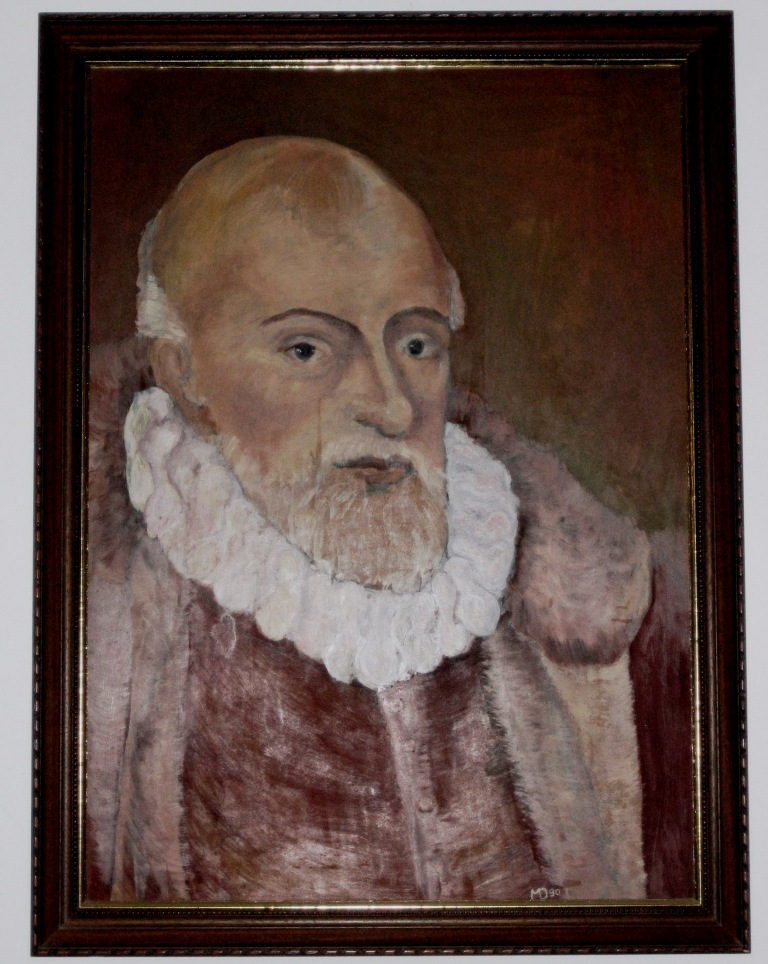
Earl Georg Ernst, Founder

Immediately after the founding of the Gymnasium, Georg Ernst also donated a "nursing and educational institution at the Gymnasium", which was opened on October 14, 1577, with 30 students. With this, Georg Ernst took the support of children and adolescents of poorer classes into his own hands. Additionally, there were scholarships that allowed the graduates to visit a university.

A large room in the former monastery served as the communal apartment. To regulate the coexistence, special regulations were introduced. These "Leges speciales", the school's oldest housing rules, remained unchanged throughout the entire first century of the school's existence.

Many graduates of the Gymnasium later studied in Leipzig. Through many studious and diligent students, after only a few decades, the school had acquired such an extraordinary reputation that around 1616 a Leipzig professor coined the phrase: "Haud fumos vendit Schleusinga - Schleusingen does not sell smoke". Due to financial constraints, the housing community had to be closed in 1637 for seven years and at reopening it initially only served as a meal catering institution for students. During the Thirty Years War (1618-1648) most of the establishment had deteriorated and had to be rebuilt.

=== Andreas Reyher as Rector (1632-1639) ===
The rectorate of Andreas Reyhers in the middle of the Thirty Years' War fell into a difficult phase of the school's existence. His activities at the Gymnasium Schleusingen were crucial for his educational employment in the following years in Gotha, which made him a well-known personality of Thuringian education and school history.

The war also affected the county of Henneberg: plague, pestilence, famine and the increasing lack of contributions to the Landschulkasse due to the incompetence of the county offices made it difficult not only the parents of students but also the school itself to be able to raise the funding. Nevertheless, Reyher wanted to reform teaching methods and published his own writings on school practice. In particular, his contributions to Greek grammar, arithmetic, and geometry enriched school life. Furthermore, he renewed the school laws and promoted theatrical performances and the integration of pedagogical approaches of Comenius, Ratke and his students Helwig and Evenius. This found in a book printed in Schleusingen on education with the title "Palaeomathia". According to Reyer, a teacher attains dignity and authority through humanity, wisdom, justice, and knowledge, and should be mindful of each student's progress, rich or poor. Andreas Reyher was in regular correspondence with scholars of his time and was also mentioned by name in a letter from Comenius to his university teacher (1633). Early on, it was possible to recognize a devotion to pedagogical realism, which in the following years brought subject focused lessons to the forefront. An example of this is his writing "Kurtzer Unterricht von natürlichen Dingen", which includes subjects related to the teaching of sciences.

After the division of the Ernestinian lands in 1640, Reyher was appointed to be the organizer of the Saxony-Gotha school system by Duke Ernst the Pious and made rector of the Residenzstadt.

=== Until the End of the 19th Century ===
With the administrative reform for the joint administration of the city of Schleusingen by Saxon princes, the school was run as a "Gemeinschaftliches Hennebergisches Gymnasium". Poverty dominated the country and this did also leave marks at the school. However, despite a lack of teaching materials and a low number of students, the grammar school and the Alumnat were able to maintain the reputation of the "illustre gymnasium" through the 18th century.

The most important teacher at the beginning of the 18th century was Christian Juncker. For almost twelve years he worked as a vice principal. Political regimes and divisions of the country favored a poor financial position of the Gymnasium in the years between 1815 and 1840. Only when 1841 Saxony-Meiningen renounced the co-administration and the exemptions in the Alumnat, was the school appointed "Royal Prussian Henneberg Gymnasium and Alumnat". It retained this title until 1918. Throughout the centuries, the lessons were still held in the building of 1502. Over time, its structural condition had deteriorated enormously. September 10, 1870, marks the beginning of the construction of a new school building. In early May 1874, students were finally able to move into this building, called the "box".

=== German Empire and Weimar Republic ===
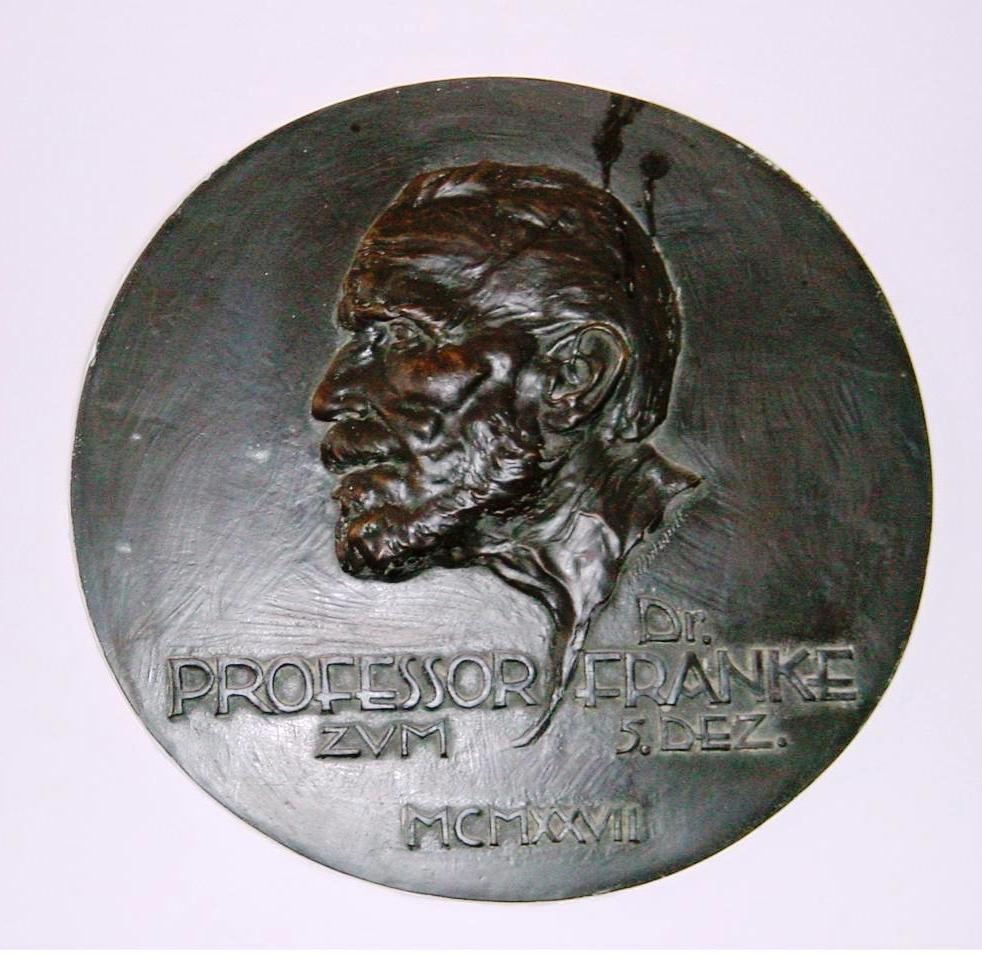
Memorial Plaque, Geologist Hermann Franke, Teacher in Schleusingen 1879- approx. 1893

At the beginning of the 20th century, the political development increasingly determined teaching content and everyday school life. The school year began after the Easter holidays in April. Special highlights in the school year were the Sedanfest, the ceremony for Luther's birthday, the Eccefeier (a celebration to remember former students, teachers, affiliates, who have died in the previous 12 months) and the celebration of the Emperor's birthday. There were also communion celebrations, excursions, swimming festivals, Advent and Christmas celebrations. The Alumni used their free time to explore Schleusingen and the surrounding area. A popular destination were the local glass and porcelain factories. Around 1907 the school was given a new ambiance by Gymnasium director Orth. Greek sculptures now adorned the corridors, rooms were painted colorfully, and the auditorium received gothic elements. The Gymnasium was the cultural center of the city; student theater-, music-, and sports events were open to the public. Professor Franke facilitated a workshop for woodworking and metalworking, where students made benches and signposts for the Thuringian Forest and demonstration equipment for physics and mathematics lessons.

With the beginning of the First World War in August 1914, many students volunteered for military service. As early as the following month, on September 8, 1914, the lessons for the higher grades were suspended, due to a lack of students. In the first year of the war, 24 of its former students fell. It was difficult to maintain school operations with so many of the students and teachers fighting at the front. Due to the increasing impoverishment, fewer and fewer foreign parents were able to bear the costs for Education and Alumnat, resulting in the number of students falling drastically. While there had been 171 students in 1913, in 1916 there were only 96 left.

After the First World War, the new, social-democratic state government of Thuringia reformed the school system again, but a large part of the teachers resisted this modernization. Pentecost 1923, the first female student was admitted.

=== Third Reich and Post-War Period ===
In a structural extension in 1928, the Direktorenhaus (Principal's building) was added to the southwest wing of the main building. As a result, the space in the Alumnat could be increased considerably. At the beginning of the thirties, the political movement of the "Third Reich" entered the city; with the assumption of office of Hitler in the year 1933, it also entered into the school life. The school was to be aligned with the political directives of the time. It became compulsory to attend rallies. Racial education was introduced as a mandatory subject, the successful completion of which was a prerequisite for graduation.

Towards the end of the war, the school operations were discontinued but could be resumed by October 1945. After setting up a girls' boarding school in 1946 in the Georg-Neumark-street, the school was renamed "Max-Greil-Oberschule" in 1947. The school now only taught four grades (9 through 12), while the lower grades from then on were taught at the local middle school.

After the German Reunification, the lessons at the school again commenced in grade 5.

=== Time in the GDR ===
Since 1946, girls had their own accommodation in today's Alumnatsgebäude, the boys were, as had been customary, on the second floor of the main school building. From 1948 only students from the ninth grade onwards attended the Gymnasium, so there was no more need for a house mistress. The coexistence in the boarding school was instead regulated by a boarding school initiative and various commissions for cultural design. In the fifties, students from different parts of the GDR came to Schleusingen. Including some celebrities of the time: Three daughters of Hermann Henselmann (chief architect Berlin Stalin Hall), the daughter of Theodor Brugsch (personal physician Ulbricht) and a niece of Horst Sindermann.

In 1952, the school celebrated its 375th anniversary. Students and teachers prepared many cultural highlights for the anniversary celebration. In addition to sports competitions and theater performances, a stargazing hike to the Stutenhaus was undertaken. The death of Stalin in 1953 had far-reaching consequences: There were no oral Abitur examinations in the field of social studies that school year, which had been made a compulsory subject only in 1952. The SED dictatorship promoted the link between school and economic production. The school (then high school) was assigned to sponsoring organizations. Depending on the assignments of their school, students had to participate in harvesting activities and were sometimes used as production aids.

In July 1958, due to space constraints, the majority of the School Library was moved to the Museum of the Bertholdsburg. Unlike with similar libraries, where stock often was burned or sold, for centuries, the approximately 15,000 volumes of the Gymnasium's School Library had been guarded and protected.

With the construction of the wall in 1961, the school was robbed of one of its teachers. On August 13, 1961, Mathematics teacher Wolfgang Pache had visited West Berlin and was "walled out". He was unable to return to the GDR and did not work as a teacher again. Clothes and literature from the West were prohibited. From 1948 onwards, all directors and about 2/3 of teachers were members of the SED. At that time this was an exception because the GDR leadership targeted a 100% membership of the teachers in the SED.

In the school year 1962/63, the "Abitur with vocational training" was introduced in Schleusingen. From motor vehicle technology to electrical engineering, toolmaking or training as a furniture specialist or industrial and commercial merchant, even vocational training in agriculture and medical nursing professions were offered. Throughout the training, students received a monthly pay between 40 and 70 marks. During holidays, internships were completed in the companies. This form of training existed until 1970. Later followed a new form of polytechnic training, the "scientific-practical work". The work itself, as well as the theses to be defended, were part of the graduation requirements (similar to today's seminar work at the Hennebergische Gymnasium). Furthermore, there was a change in the Directorate of the school. The former headmaster was reassigned to the position of boarding school director and Peter Nestler (former student, later teacher) became the youngest director of a secondary school in the Suhl district at the age of 30.

His comprehensive education reform in cooperation with the Pädagogischen Hochschule Erfurt and with some teachers modernized the school's operation. The basic building blocks of this reform were group lessons, a better student-teacher ratio, and student self-responsibility. Parts of those reforms are still anchored in the school's mission statement today.

An official order in 1983 instructed for partitions to be built in larger rooms in the old main school building in order to make room for student boarders. As early as the summer of '89, the director Katharina Pfeufer, who was put into office in 1988, allowed her students to revive the graduation baptism tradition prohibited in 1974 by the GDR regime.

=== Nineties until Today ===
In 1991, the Gymnasium was renamed to carry the name of its founder: Hennebergisches Gymnasium "Georg Ernst". In the same year, director Hubert Amthor was appointed headmaster. With the continuation of the Latin lessons in the school year 1993/94, a 100-year-old tradition could be continued. Unfortunately, another long tradition ended with the closure of the Alumnat in 1994. The establishment of new grammar schools contributed to the fact that the Gymnasium today has a primarily regional importance.

In 1999, with the demolition of the director's house began the extensive construction and renovation measures that were to contribute to the preservation of Schleusinger school. In order to ensure continuity for the 870 students during the construction period, they were accommodated in the former Alumnat building in Georg-Neumark-Straße, in the main building, in the local elementary school, and in specially provided containers. With the completion of the new building in 2001, a contemporary framework for the Schleusinger Gymnasium has been created. Additionally, the school received the additional title "Environmental- and European School". This is thanks to the collaboration of students and teachers with many other European schools as part of the Comenius project. School traditions developed over the years, such as Stöpselball, Stifterball, Elferrat conference, Christmas Party, Winter Ball, Carnival and the graduation baptism as identity-creating elements, have since taken place every school year. With the beginning of the school year 2012/13, the use of the Alumnat is also possible again: The city of Schleusingen, the Stiftung and the Hildburghausen Educational Center (HBZ) have jointly contributed to the reconstruction. This also gives students outside the region the opportunity to attend the HGS.

== Structures of the Grammar School with Alumnat and their Interaction ==
The school is a public grammar school, under the district of Hildburghausen. The State Education Office South Thuringia supports in the fulfillment of educational tasks and has the supervision of principals, assistant principals, teachers and other responsible persons. The teachers and other employees are employees of the Thuringian Ministry of Culture.

Both the Förderverein (Verein der Freunde und Förderer des Hennebergischen Gymnasiums „Georg Ernst“ Schleusingen e. V.) and the Stiftung (Stiftung des Hennebergischen Gymnasiums „Georg Ernst“ in Schleusingen) are organized under private law. They support the school in terms of their own statutes and are independent of other bodies, such as the municipality, district or Ministry of Culture. Together, they promote and shape life and learning in the school and the Alumnat.

=== The Förderverein of the Hennebergische Gymnasium "Georg Ernst" ===
Former students and teachers took the initiative in 1991 and revived the Förderverein so that it can support the interests of the school charitably; this is the statutory purpose of the association. In essence, the work is funded by membership fees and donations. All members of the association are also volunteers. The club has 349 members (as of November 2012).

==== The history of the Förderverein ====
Even before the founding of the grammar school in 1521, study grants were provided to students studying at the University of Wittenberg, as well as to underprivileged students, who were housed in the community. On September 29, 1927, on the occasion of the 350th anniversary, on the initiative of Rector Witte thirteen gentlemen met to found the first Association of Friends, to which not only teachers but also local business people belonged. In 1940, the board had to suspend its work due to politically prevailing National Socialist structures. The initiative for the revival of the Förderverein came after 1989 from school director Peter Nestler and some teachers and friends (founded in 1992). In it, graduates, parents, teachers, and school-affiliates promote educational work at the Hennebergische Gymnasium through material and moral commitment.

==== The purpose of the Förderverein ====
The following points are stipulated in the statute of the Förderverein:

- Bringing together former students, interested student parents and all patrons and friends of the Hennebergischen Gymnasium "Georg Ernst" for joint action for its well-being, especially for the preservation and maintenance of his educational assets and its school traditions
- Assistance with the procurement of teaching and learning materials for the school, as far as they go beyond the duties and possibilities of the material operator for the acquisition, but considered appropriate by teachers≥
- Promote all of its cultural aspirations, but especially his education in the form of regular scientific lectures or according to other events in public
- Supporting gifted and eligible students through cash grants or provision of teaching materials
- Special support for socially needy students.

=== The Stiftung of the Hennebergische Gymnasium "Georg Ernst" ===
Since August 2, 2006, the Stiftung of the Hennebergische Gymnasium "Georg Ernst" is a legal foundation under civil law. Its main objectives are to support and promote the high school, including by providing additional training opportunities and accommodation in the Alumnat. As founder of the Association of Friends and Supporters of the Henneberg Gymnasium "Georg Ernst" e. V. on. The tasks of the Stiftung include to develop, finance and implement long-term projects.

==== Difference between Stiftung and Förderverein ====
While the Förderverein is rather flexible and able to directly promote and support individual students and projects, the activities of the Stiftung are designed for comprehensive and long-term measures. Both pursue the common interest of preserving the traditions of the school and fulfilling the requirements of modern education. Social responsibility, promotion of high performers and contact with former students and teachers are equally important. The Board of Trustees consists of representatives from all relevant corporate bodies and groups of people relevant for education. Together, they advise and supervise the Board and its decisions on objectives and amendments to the Articles of Association. The Förderverein, the city of Schleusingen, the Wohnungsgesellschaft mbH Schleusingen and the Sparkasse Hildburghausen each have a permanent seat on the Board of Trustees.

==== From the Statute ====
The following points summarize the main focus of the Stiftung:

- Promoting a humanistic education
- Creation and implementation of enhancing educational offers
- Establishment and maintenance of international contacts
- Assistance in the procurement of teaching and learning materials
- Support of talented and socially disadvantaged students
- Establishment and operation of the Alumnat

Volunteers and partners of the Stiftung, such as the Verein Medienzentrum Henneberger Land e. V.., and the Hildburghäuser Bildungszentrum e.V. or the Technical University of Ilmenau. It is thanks to the financial support of the patrons that the Stiftung is in a position to support the Schleusinger Gymnasium. Three institutions have taken on special responsibility for the school and its foundation: The Förderverein and the foundation of the Stiftung, the Verein Medienzentrum Henneberger Land e. V. with their financial and personal commitment, and the city of Schleusingen in the form of the endowment of the Alumnat building and the financial support for the renovation of the same.

=== Alumnat of the Hennebergische Gymnasium "Georg Ernst" ===
Records of the Alumnat go back to the founding year of the Gymnasium. At that time, the institution was predominantly benefitting gifted children of impoverished parents, offering them a chance to attend school. A large number of students experienced and therefore learned here until 1994 what it means to live and work together. In 2012, the Alumnat was reopened through the city of Schleusingen, the Stiftung, and the Hildburghäuser Bildungszentrum e. V.

The sponsor of the Alumnat is the Stiftung of the Hennebergische Gymnasium "Georg Ernst" in Schleusingen. It provides land and buildings and coordinates the cooperation between the school and the operator. The operator is the Hildburghäuser Bildungszentrum e. V. It has been agreed between the Stiftung and the operator that initially also non-students can be granted accommodation in the Alumnat, provided the capacities are sufficient.

== Particularities of the Hennebergische Gymnasium "Georg Ernst" ==
As throughout its history, the HGS is heavily leaning on the traditional values and principles of the founder in 1577. With the support of students, teachers, partners, sponsors and supporters, these values and principles can be put into practice. In addition to the traditional values, principles, and traditions, the cultural orientation area has a special significance. At an early stage, historically important literary works were taught and theatrical performances rehearsed (see History). Not only the considerable collection of old books and documents (School Library) but also the current interest and focus on new forms of media (Video-AG) are based on the beginnings of the history of printing. The comprehensive all-day offer and the Alumnat, as well as the extra-curricular offers, promote the community among the students and between students and teachers. International projects and cooperations with partner schools, companies and universities enable a versatile education and, early on, place emphasis on independent acting and thinking. The practical education and the many years of experience complete the education students receive during their school years at the Hennebergische Gymnasium "Georg Ernst".

=== Values and Training ===
The school's mission statement lists the main values and principles of the school. Encourage, shape, live and learn: both students with special talents and students with learning difficulties are encouraged. Supported by the Förderverein and the Stiftung, teachers, and students have different ways to improve and enhance performance. Students with learning and performance weaknesses will be helped in the setting of the classroom. Representing this is an inscription in the main entrance area of the main building "Salus populi suprema lex" (Eng. "The good of the people is the supreme commandment").

The nurturing of a humanistic training provides the basis for comprehensive education in all subjects. As a STEM-friendly school, the HGS places great value on result-oriented education in all natural science subjects. Additional offers enable students to gain in-depth skills. International cooperation with partner schools, a good student-teacher-relationship, as well as foresight, responsibility, and participation of students, teachers and local residents in school life shape the humane image of the school, the respectful interaction in the foreground. The school is proactive in its strive for inclusion. It bears the titles "European School" and "School without Racism - School with Courage".

The proximity to the Biosphere Reserve Vessertal and the Nature Reserve Thuringian Forest, environmental education is of great importance. One student project deals with waste separation, another with the conscious use of natural resources in life. Further, in the context of a thesis, nesting places were established for the kestrels and jackdaws who inhabit the tower of the school. The entire campus is a smoking free zone and there is a green classroom for outdoor lessons. Since 1995 the school holds the title "Environmental School".

=== Abiturtaufe (Graduation Babtism) ===
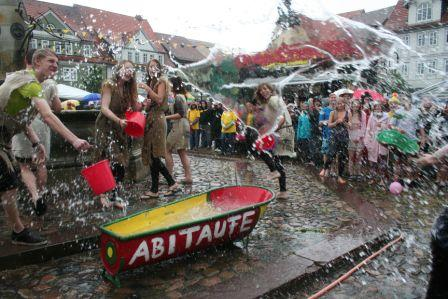
The Abitaufe (graduation baptism) is a long-standing tradition cultivated at the Hennebergische Gymnasium and represents a special Rite of Passage

Many history-steeped schools have traditions such as school balls, parties or special celebrations for the day of graduation. In Schleusingen, however, there is an in Germany unique and unrivaled tradition: the Abiturtaufe (Graduation Batism).

The tradition started long ago. After the successful completion of all exams, the graduates were carried, on the shoulders of three younger students, from the main entrance of the school, over the marketplace to the post office. This triad was supposed to symbolize a Roman chariot. From the post office, the high school graduates telegraphed their parents home, informed them of the successful completion of their studies and asked for a monetary bonus for a big celebration. When the graduating class also included women, the tradition was altered, initially only for them. Instead of being carried on the shoulders of their peers, they pulled to the post office in handcarts. However, after the Second World War, female as well as male graduates, were traveling in handcarts.

The year 1947 then marked the beginning of the tradition how it is still practiced today (it was not practiced in the GDR from 1974 to 1989. The handcart is decorated by ninth-graders with twigs, flowers, balloons and also references to the graduate riding in the cart. Two Tenth-grade students pull the cart around the school, through the city to the market square. The procession is led by the city band. At the fountain in the center of the market a short, peer composed rime is read for each of the graduates. Students of the eleventh grade, dressed up as "Klostertäufer" (monastery baptists), poor water from the Elisabethenbrunnen over handcart passengers. Occasionally, graduates will be completely submerged in a substitute fountain (an old, ornate, colorfully painted bathtub) that is filled with water from the market fountain already. In the past, the graduates were thrown straight into the fountain; however, today, in order to protect the historic fountain and the statue of Countess Elisabeth, that is not permitted anymore. To protect Saint Elisabeth from having to observe this unseemly custom, she is blindfolded ahead of the event.

=== Historical Collections of Literature in the School Library ===
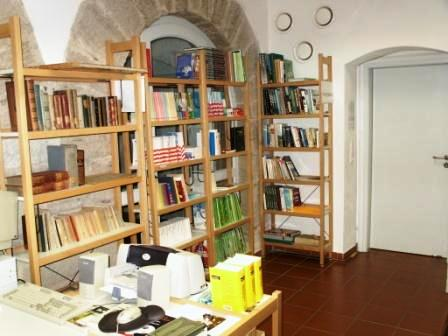
Reading Room, School Library

In the Henneberg area, the driving force for printing was in Schleusingen. As early as 1555 printing begun here following the initiative of Earl Georg Ernst. Some of the books printed are still in the School Library today. One of the most important clients for printed work was the Gymnasium.

The Schleusinger School Library was passed down almost completely and is one of the oldest of its kind. Through the comprehensive history of the school it was possible to collect many precious books over the years. In the beginning, this is mostly attributed to Earl Georg Ernst. In the following years, to rectors and teachers of the school, who donated their books to the library. The majority of the collection is stored in the Bertholdsburg. The well-preserved and precious books thematize the history of Henneberg and the regional history of Thuringia. The oldest book is a manuscript from 1424. In addition, 24 handwritten manuscripts and an original letter in Latin authored by Martin Luther from 1536 belong to the collection. In total, the library comprises 17,747 volumes and 199 incunabula. Since 1958, the historic collection is located in the Naturhistorischen Museum at Schloss Bertholdsburg.

The school itself has a book collection of current literature and a reading room that is open to students. Additionally, cultural events, such as author readings, organized by the school and the city can be held in the school library. Older students use the library as a reading room during times without classes. The borrowing of books is possible for all students and teachers.

The collection of the School Library in Schleusingen, has been a valuable resource for numerous research personalities, whose work profited significantly from what has been amassed.

=== Culture and Media Orientation ===
School Museum

In the attic of the new building is a school museum maintained by students. It shows the history of the school from its beginnings until today. Collages were created for this purpose. The design and presentation of pictures, contemporary documents and old works of art were also implemented by students. After a renovation, the school museum reopened in 2013 and can be visited during the annual open house. In the future, the museum will be expanded with a digital photo gallery to meet the demands of modern media.

School Club

The school club has a long tradition at the Hennebergische Gymnasium. It is located in the vaulted cellar of the school. Musical and cultural events were organized here until 2012. Performers also included non-student bands. Additionally, other miscellaneous events were organized. At least once a month there was a club night, where several bands from the region performed. In November 2013, the activities of the school club were resumed under the name "Clubkeller" with the support of a small student group and the school social worker. The club itself does not belong to the organization of the school but is supported by the Stiftung. It is an independent entity and is therefore independent of the administration of the school district Hildburghausen.

Dances and Events

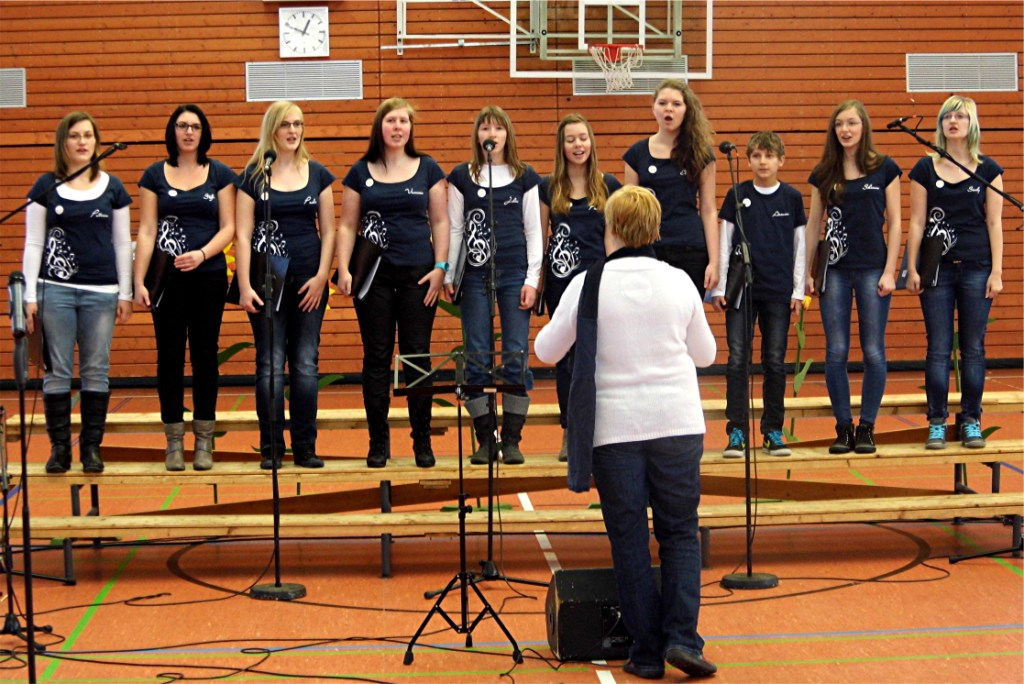
School Choir

Various school balls, such as the Stöpselball or the Stifterball, are organized annually by students with the support of teachers. These events are not only accessible to students but also to external guests. Teachers supervise the events and ensure a smooth process.

School Choir

The school choir of the Hennebergischen Gymnasium "Georg Ernst", the "Young Voices", was founded in the school year 2010/11.

Student Newspaper

The editors of the student newspaper "KlosterNews" are joined as part of a student working group. KlosterNews is classified as a journalistic editorial offer within the meaning of Section 55 (2) of the State Treaty on Broadcasting and Telemedia (RStV) in conjunction with Section 5 of the Telemedia Act (TMG). The board of the Stiftung acts as the service provider, it is represented by the headmaster.

Media Studies

In grades 5 and 6, the teaching of media literacy will be integrated into the classroom. The focus in the fifth grade is on print media and in the sixth on media design. In seventh grade students take a Media Studies course and are taught about modern media. Projects in grades eight and nine deepen this knowledge. After successful completion of the projects, the acquired media competence is confirmed with a certificate. Focus of the project work are productive activities that then benefit the school television program. Under the professional guidance of teachers and staff of the media center, Henneberger Land e. V. students create videos and movies, edit and add a soundtrack.

=== Alumnat and Full-Time Offer ===
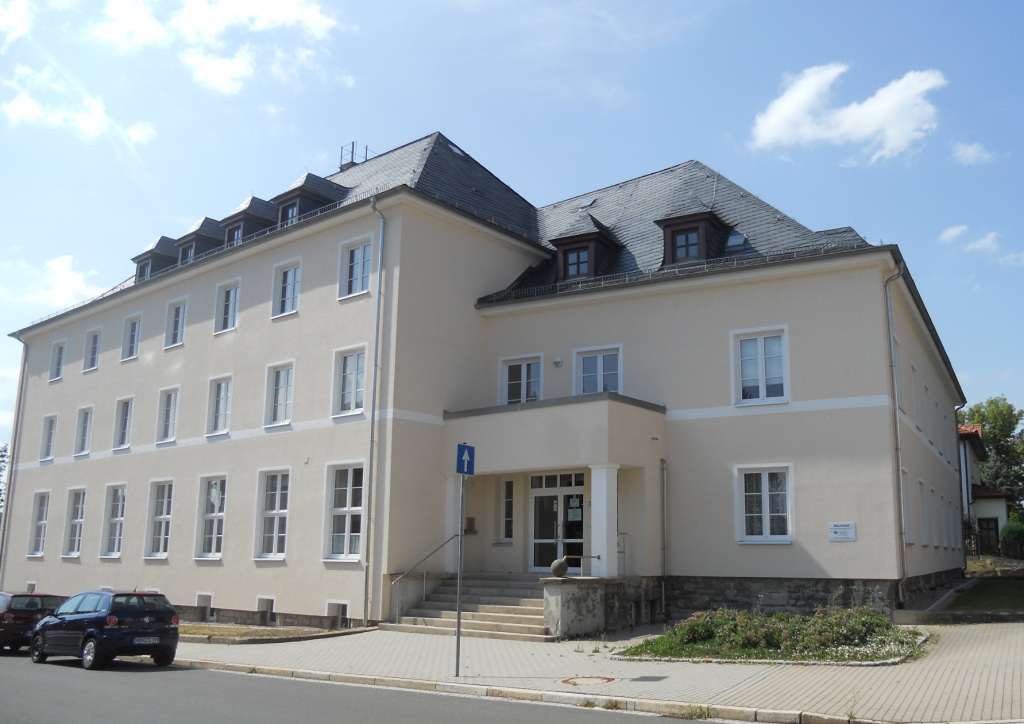
Alumnat Building

Although there were interim, temporary shutdowns lasting a few years, the Alumnat (boarding school) operations can be traced back to a total of 435 years of tradition. The opportunity for students to live in the Alumnat is an integral part of the school's all-day concept and is continued as a tradition with its reopening in 2012. The HBZ as the operator of the Alumnat has many years of experience in student housing and care.

The all-day concept also includes plenty of breaks, regulated breakfast and lunch offers, as well as designated, separate areas such as a cafeteria, library and student resting areas to balance the classroom work.

== Well-Known Students and Teachers ==
Students

- Ortolph Fomann der Ältere (1560–1634), Philosopher and legal scholar
- Vincentius Schmuck (1565–1628), Theologian, deacon and hymn writer, Rector of the University of Leipzig
- Joachim Zehner (1566–1612), Superintendent and founder of the Zehnerschen library in the Natural History Museum Schleusingen
- Sebastian Abesser (1581–1638), Theologian, deacon and superintendent
- Andreas Corvinus (1589–1648), Rhetorician, philologist and lawyer, Rector of the University of Leipzig
- Ortolph Fomann der Jüngere, Historian and legal scholar
- Johann Lorenz Bausch (1605–1665), Physician and co-founder of the Deutschen Akademie der Naturforscher Leopoldina (Student 1615–1621)
- Sebastian Franck (1606–1668), Pastor and composer
- Johann Flittner (1618–1678), Theologian, hymn writer and composer
- Johann Kühn (1619–1676), mathematics professor
- Georg Neumark (1621–1681), poet and composer
- Samuel Reyher (1635–1714), mathematics professor, lawyer and astronomer
- Johann Kaspar Wetzel (1691–1755), Theologian, hymnologist and hymn writer
- Johann Michael Herbart (1703–1769), Educator, grammar school director
- Johann Friedrich Doles (1715–1797), Composer, Thomaskantor and university music director
- Johann Adolf von Schultes (1744–1821), Archivist and historian
- Johann Georg Eck (1745–1808), Professor of Ethics, Politics and Poetry, Rector of the University of Leipzig
- Johann Georg Tinius (1764–1846), Theologian and bibliomaniac
- Christian Friedrich Gottlieb Thon (1773–1844), author of non-fiction
- Friedrich Wilhelm Lomler (1774–1845), Theologian and writer
- Ernst Anschütz (1780–1861), Cantor and organist at the Leipzig Georgenkirche, folk song composer
- Christian Schreiber (philosopher) (1781–1857), Theologian, philologist, poet and educator
- Johann Daniel Elster (1796–1857), Music professor, composer, choir founder and Philhellene
- Georg Brückner (1800–1881), Geographer and Hennebergian historian
- Heinrich Kleffel (1811–1896), Judge, mayor of Tilsit
- Oskar Schade (1826–1906), Germanist and university professor
- Friedrich Zange (1846–1931), Educator and evangelical theologian
- Ewald Gnau (1853–1943), Botanist, pedagogue, astronomer; Co-founder of the Europa-Rosariums in Sangerhausen (Schüler von 1869–1873)
- Konrad Ortmann (1867–1918), Educator, member of the Reichstag
- Hermann Reinhold (1893–1940), Professor of Physical Chemistry
- Hanns Joachim Friedrichs (1927–1995), Journalist and TV presenter
- Siegfried Dinsel (1934), TV technician, tennis official (Federal Cross of Merit 2001)
- Ulrich Mann (1953), Musician, composer and music teacher (keyboarder of the rock band Silly)

Teachers

- Melchior Vulpius, Composer (teacher from 1589)
- Andreas Reyher (1601–1673), Philologist, theologian, pedagogue (Rector from 1632–1639)
- Christian Juncker, Historian (teacher from 1696–1708)
- Friedrich Karl Kraft (1786–1866), Altphilologist, lexicographer (teacher from 1810–1816)
- Matthias Paul Kramer (1842–1898), Educator, school board member and biologist (teacher from 1868–1870)
- Friedrich Zange (1846–1931), Educator and evangelical theologian (teacher from 1874–1876)
- Hermann Franke, Geologist and mineralogist (teacher from 1879 until approximately 1893)
- Friedrich Karl Exner, graphic artist (Gym- and Drawing teacher from 1928)
- Reinhold Richter, Watercolorist and draftsman (Art- and Geography teacher from 1949)

== Gallery ==
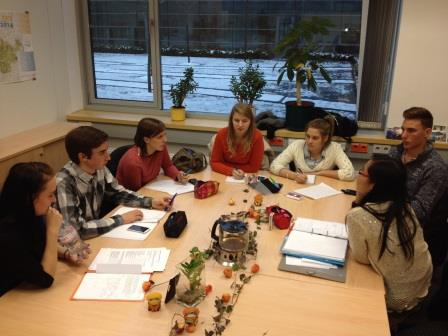
International Orientation

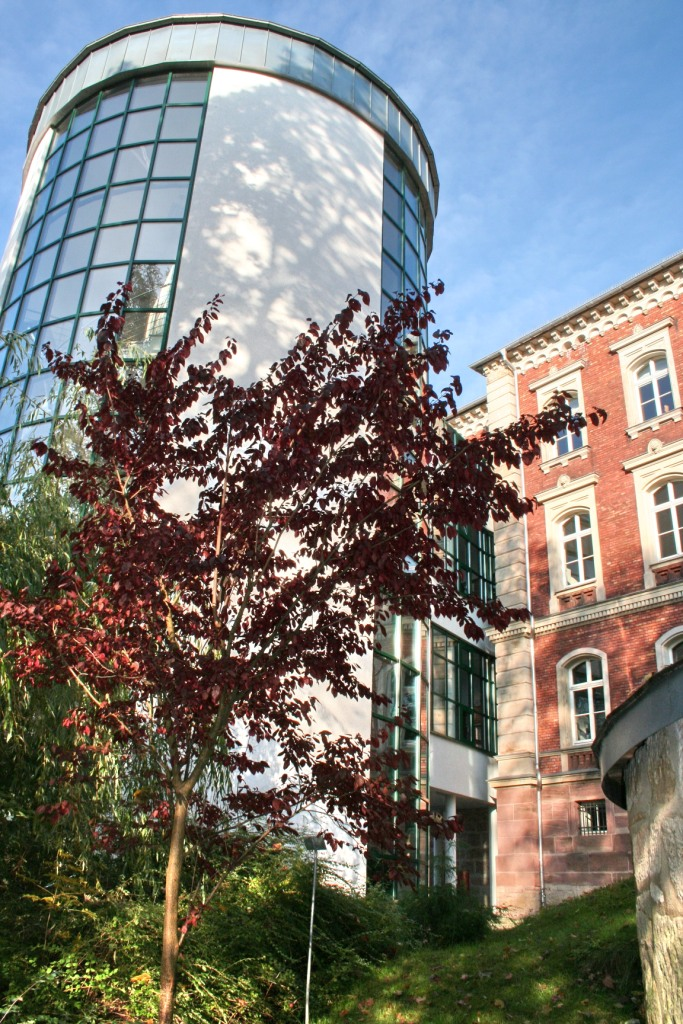
Tower (additional new building)

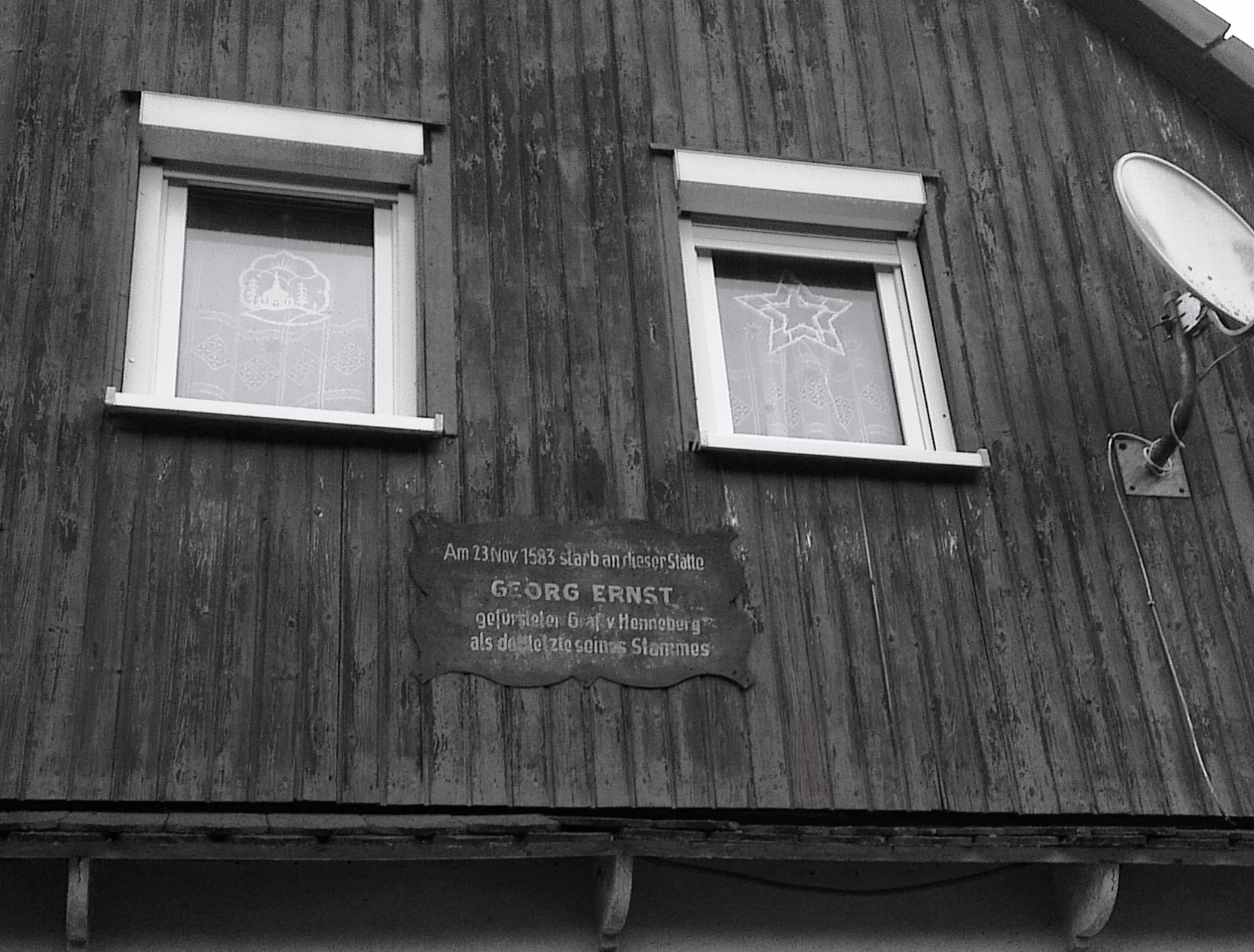
Memorial Plaque Earl Georg Ernst
