= Vesser =

Vesser may refer to:

== People ==
- Dale Vesser (born 1932), lieutenant general in the United States Army
- John Vesser (1900–1996), American football player, coach of football and basketball, and college athletics administrator

== Places ==
- Vesser (Suhl), a district of Suhl, in Thuringia, Germany
  - Vesser (river), of Thuringia, Germany

== See also ==
- Vassar (disambiguation)
