= Wilhelm Germann =

German Protestant theologian and missionary (1840–1902)

Wilhelm Germann (3 April 1840, in Gardelegen – 7 February 1902, in Meiningen) was a German Protestant theologian and missionary.

He studied theology in Erlangen and in 1864 became a member of the Lutheran Leipzig Mission. In 1865 he was ordained as a minister, and later the same year, began work as a missionary in Madras, India. In 1867 he returned to Germany, and subsequently served as a minister in Meiningen. In 1886, he was named a church councilor and superintendent in Wasungen. In 1894 he was awarded with an honorary degree by the Faculty of Theology at Leipzig.

== Published works ==
He is best known as the author of biographies, especially works involving missionaries to India, such as Johann Phillip Fabricius (1865), Bartholomäus Ziegenbalg and Heinrich Plütschau (1868) and Christian Friedrich Schwarz (1870).

- Johann Philipp Fabricius : seine fünfzigjährige Wirksamkeit im Tamulenlande und das Missionsleben des achtzehten Jahrhunderts daheim und draussen, 1865 – Johann Philipp Fabricius: his fifty years of activity in Tamilakam, etc.
- Ziegenbalg und Plütschau : die Gründungsjahre der Trankebarschen Mission; ein Beitrag zur Geschichte des Pietismus nach handschriftlichen Quellen und ältesten Drucken, 1868 – Ziegenbalg and Plütschau: the founding years of the Tranquebar Mission; a contribution to the history of Pietism, etc.
- Missionar Christian Friedrich Schwartz : sein Leben und Wirken aus Briefen des Halleschen Missionsarchivs, 1870 – Christian Friedrich Schwarz: his life and work from letters of the Halle Mission archive.
- Die Kirche der Thomaschristen : ein Beitrag zur Geschichte der orientalischen Kirchen, 1877 – The Church of the Saint Thomas Christians: a contribution to the history of the eastern churches.
- Heinrich Melchior Mühlenberg : Patriarch der Lutherischen kirche Nordamerika's : Selbstbiographie, 1711–1743, (as editor, 1881) – Heinrich Melchior Muhlenberg; patriarch of the Lutheran Church of North America: self-biography.
- D. Johann Forster, der Hennebergische Reformator, ein Mitarbeiter und Mitstreiter D. Martin Luthers, 1894 – Johann Forster, the Henneberg reformer, an associate and collaborator of Martin Luther.
- M. Christian Juncker und sein hennebergisches Geschichtswerk : eine Untersuchung : zum Säkular-Geburtstage Georg Brückners, 1900 – Christian Juncker and his Henneberg historical work, etc.

In the Allgemeine Deutsche Biographie, he was the author of biographies on Bernhard II, Duke of Saxe-Meiningen, Georg Brückner and Wilhelm I of Henneberg-Schleusingen.
