= Erle (river) =

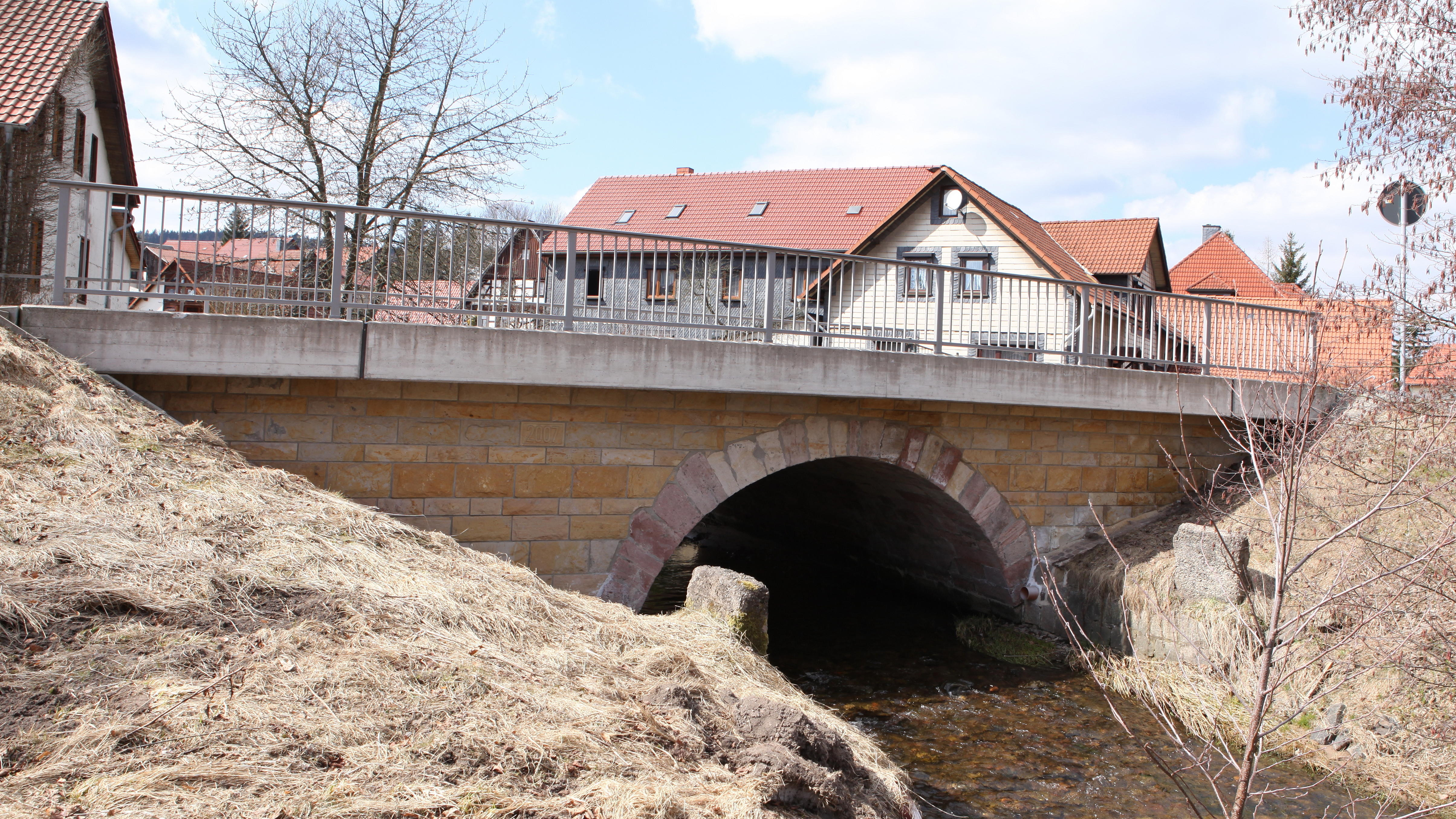

Location
- Country: Germany
- State: Thuringia

Physical characteristics
- Mouth
  - location: Nahe
  - coordinates: 50.5088°N 10.7476°E

Basin features
- Progression: Nahe→ Schleuse→ Werra→ Weser→ North Sea

Erle (German pronunciation: [ˈɛʁlə]) is a river of Thuringia, Germany. The river has a length of 14.2 kilometres (8.8 mi). It joins the Nahe in Schleusingen.

== See also ==
- List of rivers of Thuringia
