= Vessertal-Thüringen Forest =

Biosphere reserve in Thuringia, Germany

Coordinates: 50.3600°N 10.4800°E

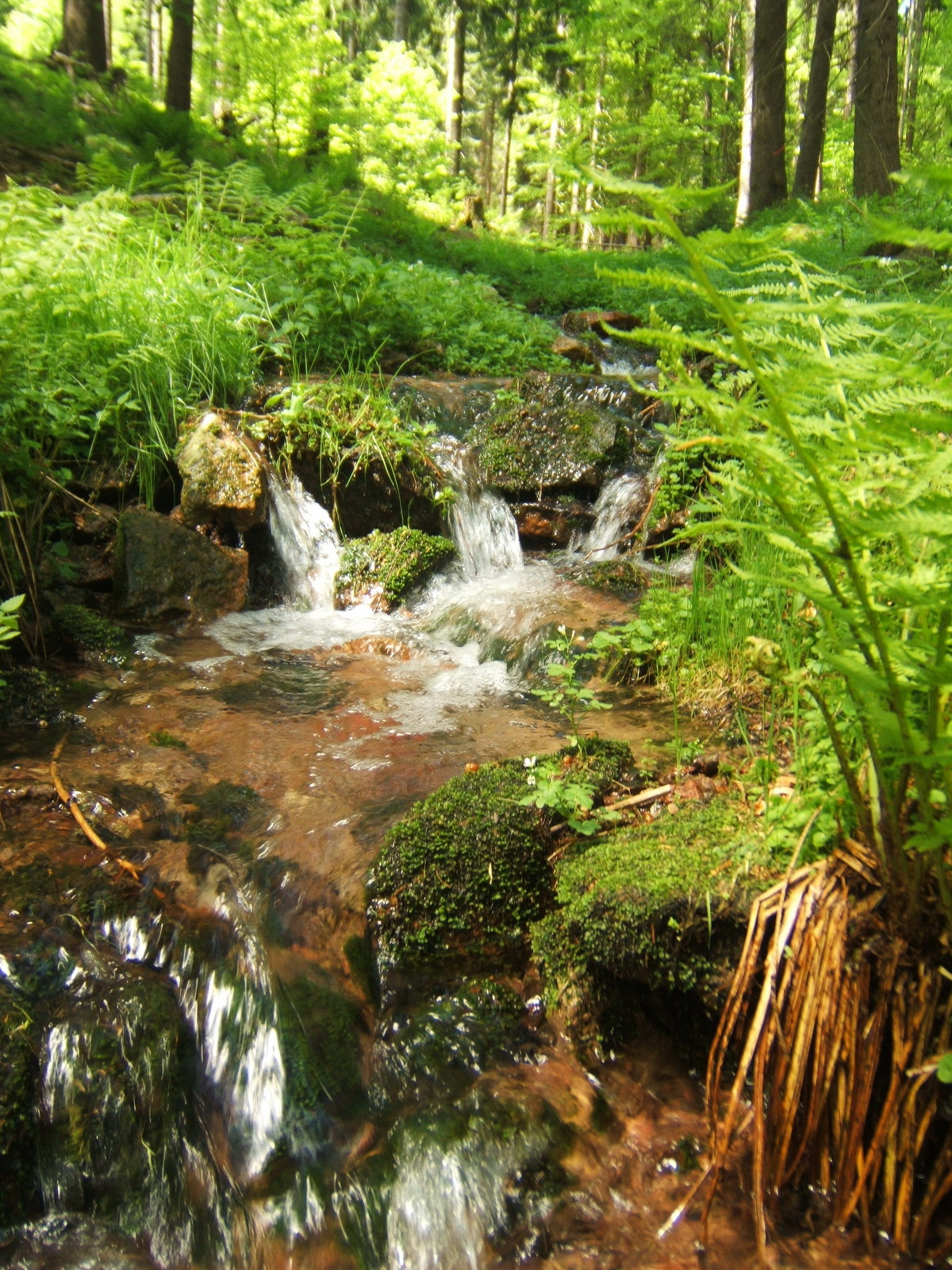
The Vesser river

The Biosphere Reserve Thuringian Forest, until 2016 known as the Biosphere Reserve Vessertal-Thuringian Forest, forms a central part of the much larger Thuringian Forest.

In 1979, the Biosphere Reserve Vessertal was established as one of the first UNESCO biosphere reserves in Germany. The biosphere protection was expanded in 1990, when the Thuringian Forest Nature Park was founded, and again in 2018. It currently covers an area of 337 km^{2}.

The Biosphere Reserve Thuringian Forest is crossed by the famous German hiking trail ‘Rennsteig’.

== The biosphere ==
The UNESCO Biosphere Reserve Thuringian Forest is part of Thuringian Forest Nature Park and comprises mainly large contiguous mountain spruce forests. Furthermore, beech forests, block and rock forest communities, high-elevation raised bogs can be found. Upland, low-lying and valley meadows reflect the extensive use by people for dairy cow raising. The entire biosphere reserve has been designated as Natura 2000 site and European Bird Protection Area because of black grouse (Tetrao tetrix) and black stork (Ciconia nigra) populations.

The biosphere reserve is only sparsely populated (4,200 people in the transition area in 2001). The area is also important for the protection of water resources. Activities in the transition area are agriculture, fish farming, commerce and retail, forestry, glass manufacture and crafts. Tourism is a major source of income in the region.

The major habitats & land cover types are mixed mountain forest dominated by Picea abies, Fagus sylvatica and Acer pseudoplatanus, sometimes mixed with Abies alba and Ulmus glabra; mountain clefts with Fraxinus excelsior, Acer platanoides and Alnus glutinosa; mountainous hay meadow with Trisetum flavescens, Geranium sylvaticum, Arnica montana together with several orchid species such as Coeloglossum viride and Dactylorhiza sambucina; mountain springs and streams with Phalaris arundinacea, Mimulus guttatus, Veronica beccabunga etc.; wet meadows; riverine herb communities with Filipendula ulmaria, Petasites hybridus and Chaerophyllum hirsutum; low mountain range grassland as pasture or hay pasture.

== Sources ==
This article incorporates text from a free content work (license statement/permission). Text taken from UNESCO - MAB Biosphere Reserves Directory, UNESCO, UNESCO.
