= Georg Brückner =

German regional historian

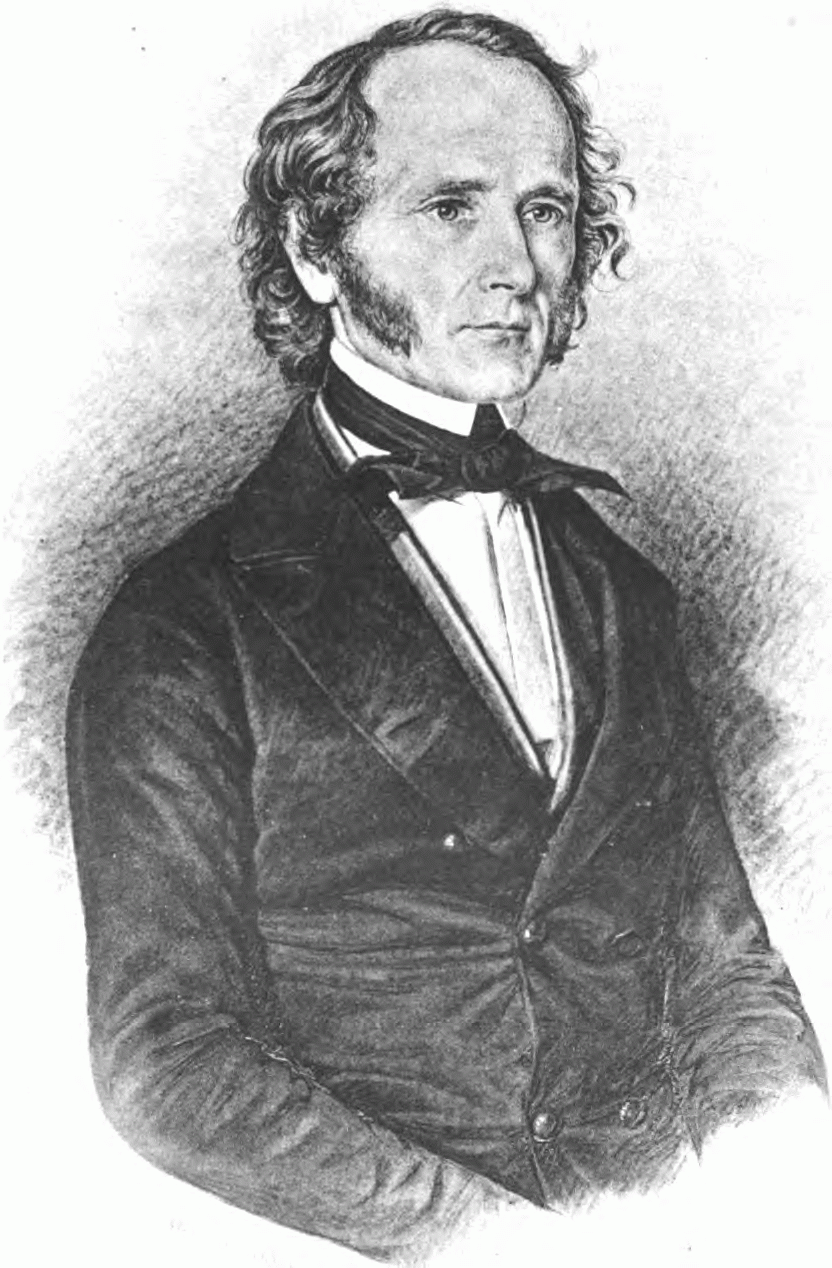
Georg Brückner

Johann Georg Martin Brückner (31 October 1800 in Oberneubrunn – 1 July 1881 in Meiningen) was a German historian and geographer.

He attended the gymnasium in Schleusingen, and from 1921 studied at the University of Jena. Afterwards, he taught classes in Klein Glienicke, near Potsdam, and in 1831 was named rector at the Bürgerschule in Hildburghausen. From 1841 he was a professor at the Realschule in Meiningen. From 1866 to 1875 he was director of the Hennebergischen Alterthumsforschenden Vereins (Henneberg Antiquarian Research Association).

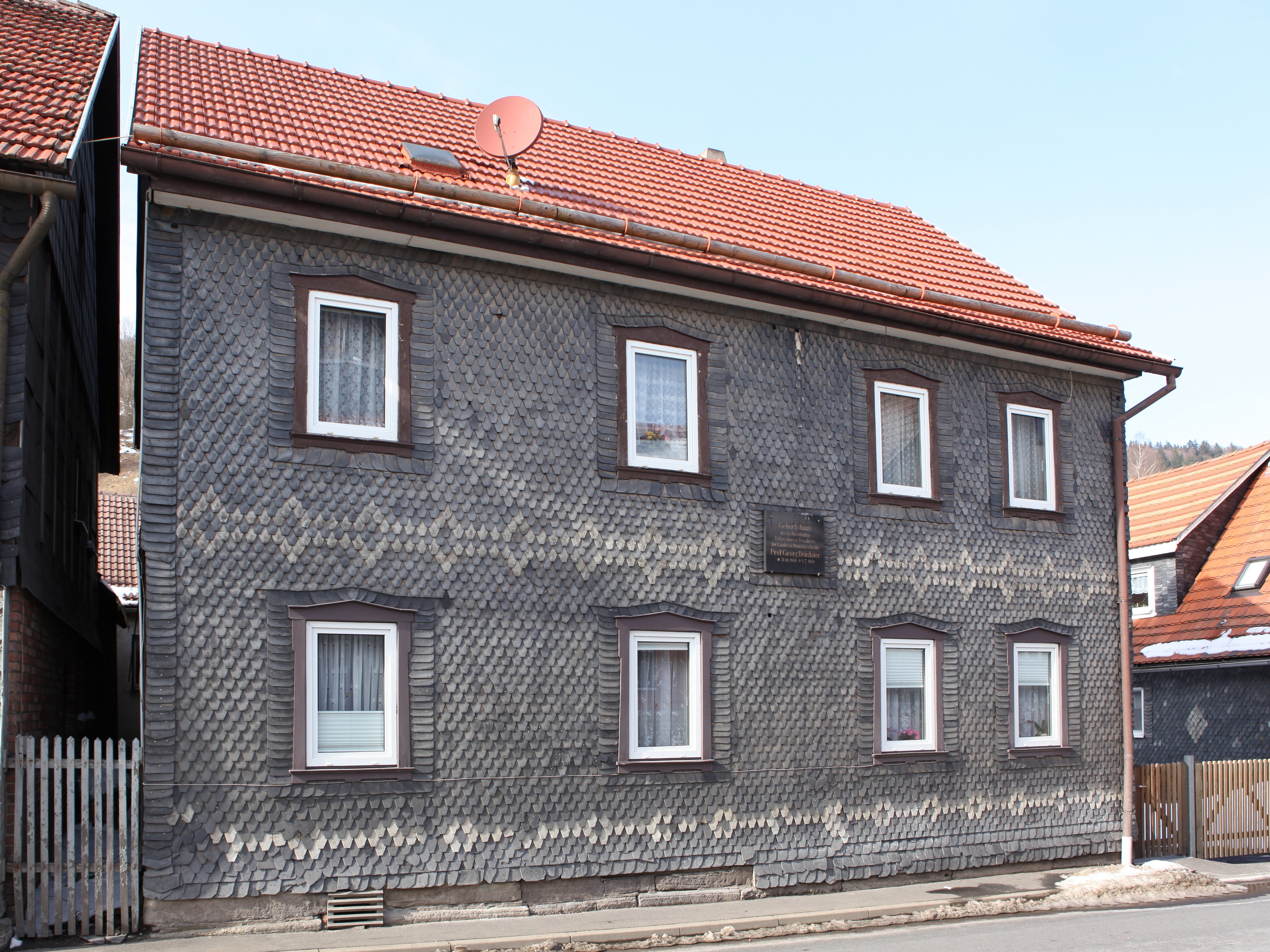
Brückner's birthplace in Oberneubrunn

== Selected works ==
- Handbuch der neuesten Erdbeschreibung, 1837 – Manual of the latest geography.
- Hennebergisches Urkundenbuch (7 volumes, 1842–77) – Henneberg register.
  - Volume 1: The documents of the Henneberg archive at Meiningen; years 933–1330.
  - Volume 2: The documents of the Henneberg archive at Meiningen; years 1330–1356.
  - Volume 3: The documents of the Henneberg archive at Meiningen; years 1356–1385.
  - Volume 4: The documents of the Henneberg archive at Meiningen; years 1385–1412.
  - Volume 5: Supplementary volume.
  - Volume 6: The documents of the Henneberg archive at Meiningen; years 1413–1432.
  - Volume 7: The documents of the Henneberg archive at Meiningen; years 1433–1452.
- Landeskunde des Herzogthums Meiningen (2 parts, 1851–53) – Geography of the Duchy of Meiningen.
- Denkwürdigkeiten aus Frankens und Thüringens geschichte und statistik, 1852 – On Franconian and Thuringian history and statistics.
- Schiller in Bauerbach, 1856 – Friedrich Schiller in Bauerbach.
- Volks- und Landeskunde des Fürstenthums Reuß j.L., 1870 – People and geography of the Principality of the Reuss Junior Line.

He was the author of 47 biographies in the Allgemeine Deutsche Biographie.
