= Franz Brümmer =

Karl Wilhelm Franz Brümmer (17 November 1836, Wusterhausen – 30 January 1923, Munich) was a German educator and lexicographer.

He attended the teaching seminar in Köpenick and later worked as an instructor in Zehdenick (from 1856) and Trebbin (from 1860). In 1863 he moved to Nauen, where in 1879 he was appointed conrector of the boys' school.

== Published works ==
He is best remembered as the author of detailed lexicons involving German poets and writers of prose, such as:

- Lexikon der deutschen Dichter und Prosaisten von den ältesten Zeiten bis zum Ende des 18. Jahrhunderts, (1884) – Lexicon of German poets and prose writers from the earliest times to the end of the 18th century.
- Deutsches Dichter-Lexicon. Biographische und bibliographische Mittheilungen über deutsche Dichter aller Zeiten. Unter besonderer Berücksichtigung der Gegenwart (2 volumes 1886–87) – German lexicon of poets; biographical and bibliographical information.
- Lexikon der deutschen Dichter und Prosaisten von Beginn des 19. Jahrhunderts bis zur Gegenwart (8 volumes, 6th edition 1913) – Lexicon of German poets and prose writers of the early 19th century to the present.

He was the author of over 200 biographies in the Allgemeine Deutsche Biographie.
