= Nahe (Schleuse) =

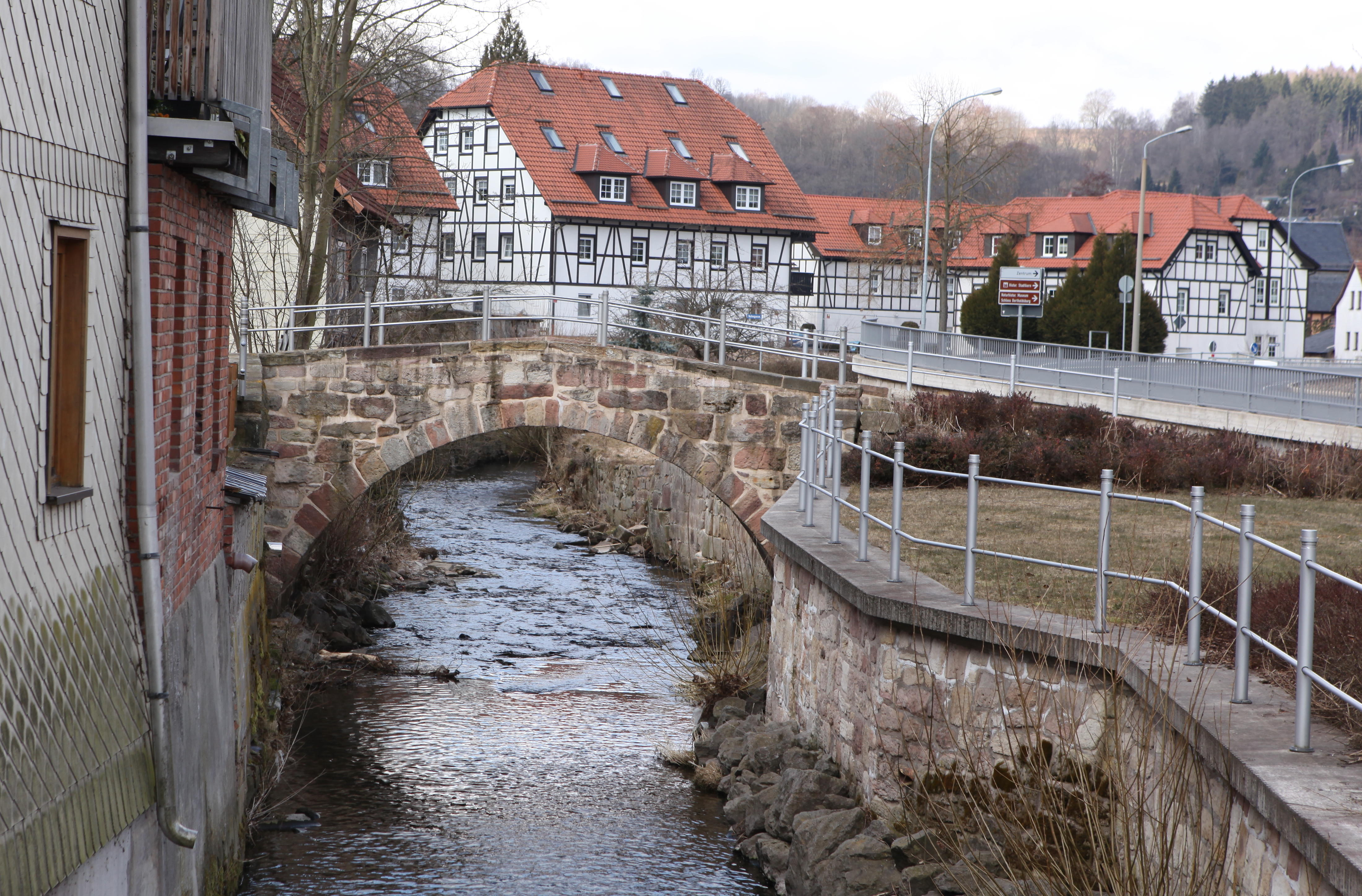

Location
- Country: Germany
- States: Thuringia

Physical characteristics
- Mouth
  - location: Schleuse
  - coordinates: 50.5012°N 10.7399°E

Basin features
- Progression: Schleuse→ Werra→ Weser→ North Sea

Nahe (German pronunciation: [ˈnaːə]) is a river of Thuringia, Germany. It joins the Schleuse in Schleusingen.

== See also ==
- List of rivers of Thuringia
