= Sankt Kilian =

- Ortsteil of Schleusingen
- Interactive map of Sankt Kilian
- Location within Germany Location within Thuringia
- Coordinates: 50°34′N 10°44′E
- Country: Germany
- State: Thuringia
- District: Hildburghausen
- Town: Schleusingen

Area
  - Total: 54.88 km^{2} (21.19 sq mi)
- Elevation: 395 m (1,296 ft)

Population (2016-12-31)
  - Total: 2,713
  - Density: 49.44/km^{2} (128.0/sq mi)
- Time zone: UTC+01:00 (CET)
  - Summer (DST): UTC+02:00 (CEST)
- Postal codes: 98553
- Dialling codes: 036841
- Website: www.gg-sankt-kilian.de

Sankt Kilian is a village and a former municipality in the district of Hildburghausen, in Thuringia, Germany. Since July 2018, it is part of the town of Schleusingen, Thuringia.
