= Schleusingen =

- Town
- Coat of arms

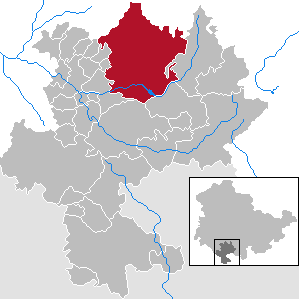
- Location of Schleusingen within Hildburghausen district
- Interactive map of Schleusingen
- Location within Germany Location within Thuringia
- Coordinates: 50°31′N 10°45′E
- Country: Germany
- State: Thuringia
- District: Hildburghausen
- Subdivisions: 7

Government
  - Mayor (2018–24): Andre Henneberg

Area
  - Total: 125.56 km^{2} (48.48 sq mi)
- Elevation: 372 m (1,220 ft)

Population (2025-12-31)
  - Total: 10,225
  - Density: 81.435/km^{2} (210.92/sq mi)
- Time zone: UTC+01:00 (CET)
  - Summer (DST): UTC+02:00 (CEST)
- Postal codes: 98553
- Dialling codes: 036841
- Vehicle registration: HBN
- Website: www.schleusingen.de

Schleusingen (German pronunciation: [ˈʃlɔʏzɪŋən]) is a town in the district of Hildburghausen, in Thuringia, Germany. It is situated 10 km north of Hildburghausen, and 12 km southeast of Suhl.

== Geography ==
The town of Schleusingen in the Henneberger Land got its name from the river Schleuse, which passes through its town districts Ratscher and Rappelsdorf. The town itself is located on the river Nahe, a tributary of the Schleuse, which runs south of the core town area. From the north, from Erlau, the river Erle joins the Nahe in Schleusingen.

=== Subdivisions ===
The town of Schleusingen includes next to the core town another seventeen districts: Altendambach, Breitenbach, Erlau, Fischbach, Geisenhöhn, Gethles, Gottfriedsberg, Heckengereuth, Hirschbach, Hinternah, Oberrod, Rappelsdorf, Ratscher, Schleusingerneundorf, Silbach, Sankt Kilian and Waldau

In addition, terms for residential areas such as' 'Upper-' 'and' 'Lower Town, Schmuckplatz, Weißer Berg, Hirtengrund, Kalkrangen, Sonneneck, Rubetal ' etc. are common in the population.

== History ==
Schleusingen was first mentioned in documents in 1232 as 'Villa Slusungen'. Count Poppo VII of Henneberg built the Bertholdsburg as a residence and fortification in the period from 1226 to 1232. In 1274 the County of Henneberg was partitioned into three lines; the Bertholdsburg then became the residence of the Schleusinger line of the Counts of Henneberg. Schleusingen experienced a catastrophic fire in 1353; further fires in 1679, 1765, 1773 and 1876 destroyed whole districts of the town.

In 1412 Schleusingen received the Stadtrecht (the right to be considered a town) but only in 1533 the Marktrecht (the right to, among other things, hold a folk festival or a weekly market). In 1502 Count Wilhelm IV founded a Barfüsserkloster (monastery) in the outskirts. During the riots in the German Peasants' War in the spring of 1525, the inhabitants, documents and valuables of the neighboring monasteries Veßra and Trostadt were sent to Schleusingen to be brought to safety at the Bertholdsburg. In 1544 the Reformation was introduced. The Aegidienkapelle of the St. Johannis Church became the burial place of the Counts of Henneberg in 1566 and of Elisabeth of Brandenburg. The Barfüsserkloster was transferred into state ownership and from 1560 it was used as a school. On 7 June 1577 this school was inaugurated on as a Gymnasium (high school) and still exists today under the name Hennebergisches Gymnasium "Georg Ernst". Until 1583 Schleusingen was the seat of the Counts of Henneberg. After the death of Count Georg Ernst, with whose death the Henneberg line was extinguished, Schleusingen was transferred to the Saxon dukes of the Ernestine and the Albertine lines, at first under joint administration. From 1500 to 1806 Schleusingen belonged to the Franconian Circle of the Holy Roman Empire.

=== Incorporations ===
- Fischbach on 1 March 1970
- Geisenhöhn and Gottfriedsberg on 1 April 1974
- Gethles, Ratscher and Heckengereuth on 22 February 1994
- Rappelsdorf on 1 June 1996
- Nahetal-Waldau and Sankt Kilian on 6 July 2018

=== Population Development ===
Population development (from 1960 on 31 December):

- 1791: 2,050
- 1831: 2,725
- 1852: 3,105
- 1960: 5,310
- 1994: 5,585
- 1995: 5,605
- 1996: 6,007
- 1997: 5,995
- 1998: 5,990
- 1999: 5,949
- 2000: 5,923
- 2001: 5,854
- 2002: 5,892
- 2003: 5,868
- 2004: 5,808
- 2005: 5,769
- 2006: 5,653
- 2007: 5,609
- 2008: 5,481
- 2009: 5,445
- 2010: 5,384
- 2011: 5,415
- 2012: 5,392
- 2013: 5,394
- 2014: 5,390
- 2015: 5,342
- 2016: 5,391

== Main sights ==
- Castle Bertholdsburg
- Townchurch St. Johannis
- Teutsche Schule
- market place

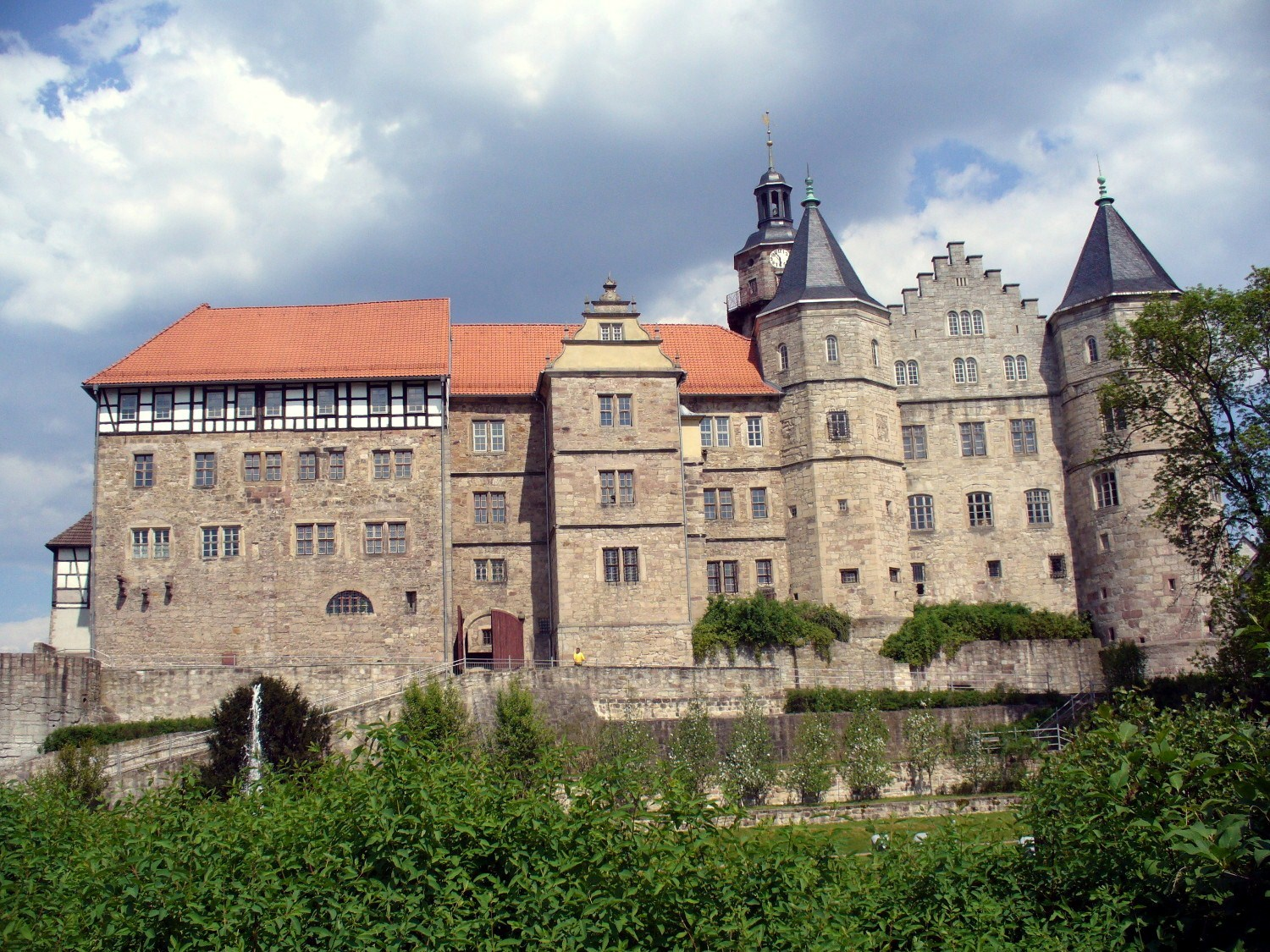
Castle Bertholdsburg; built between 1223 and 1232

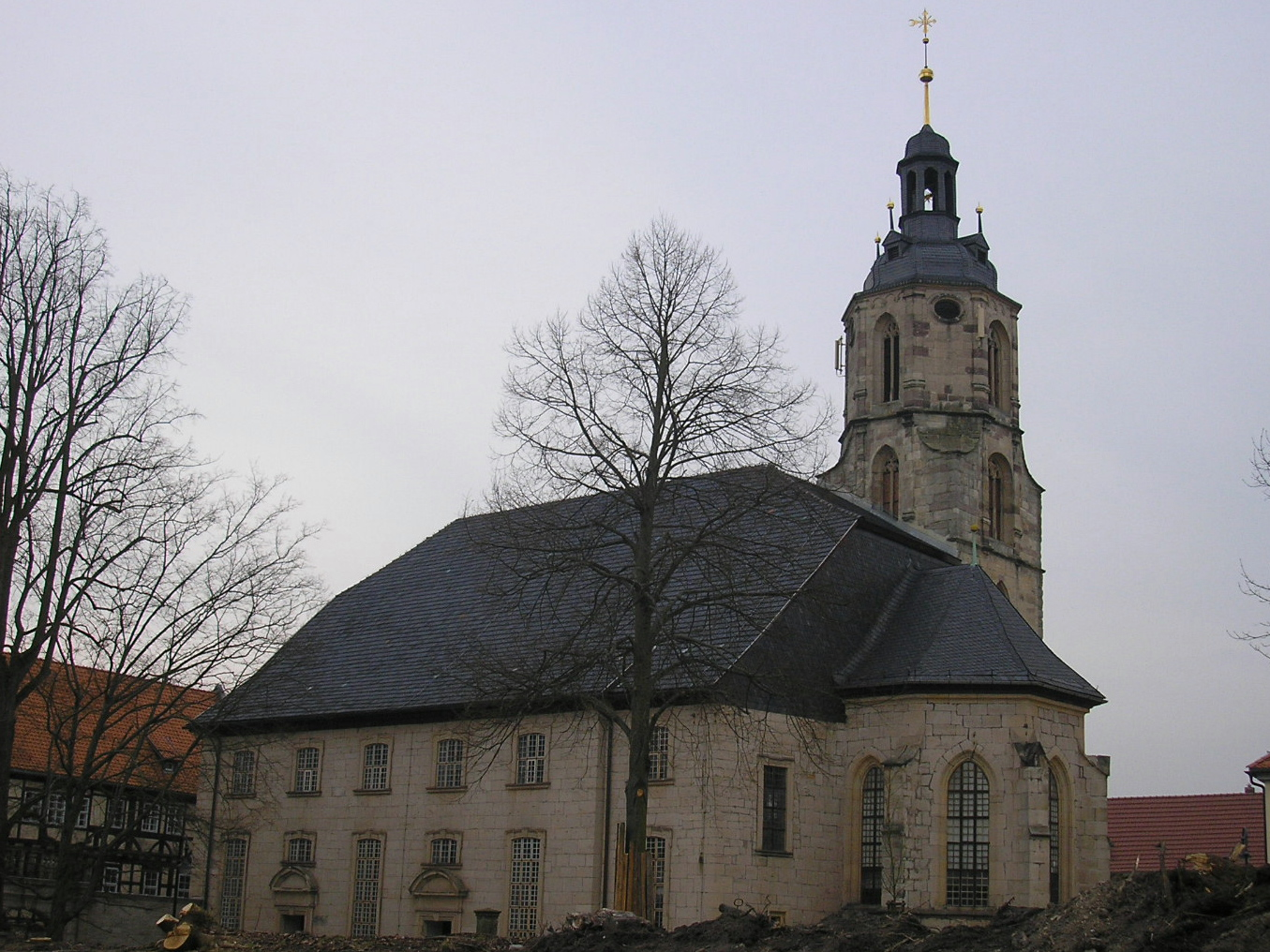
Townchurch St. Johannis

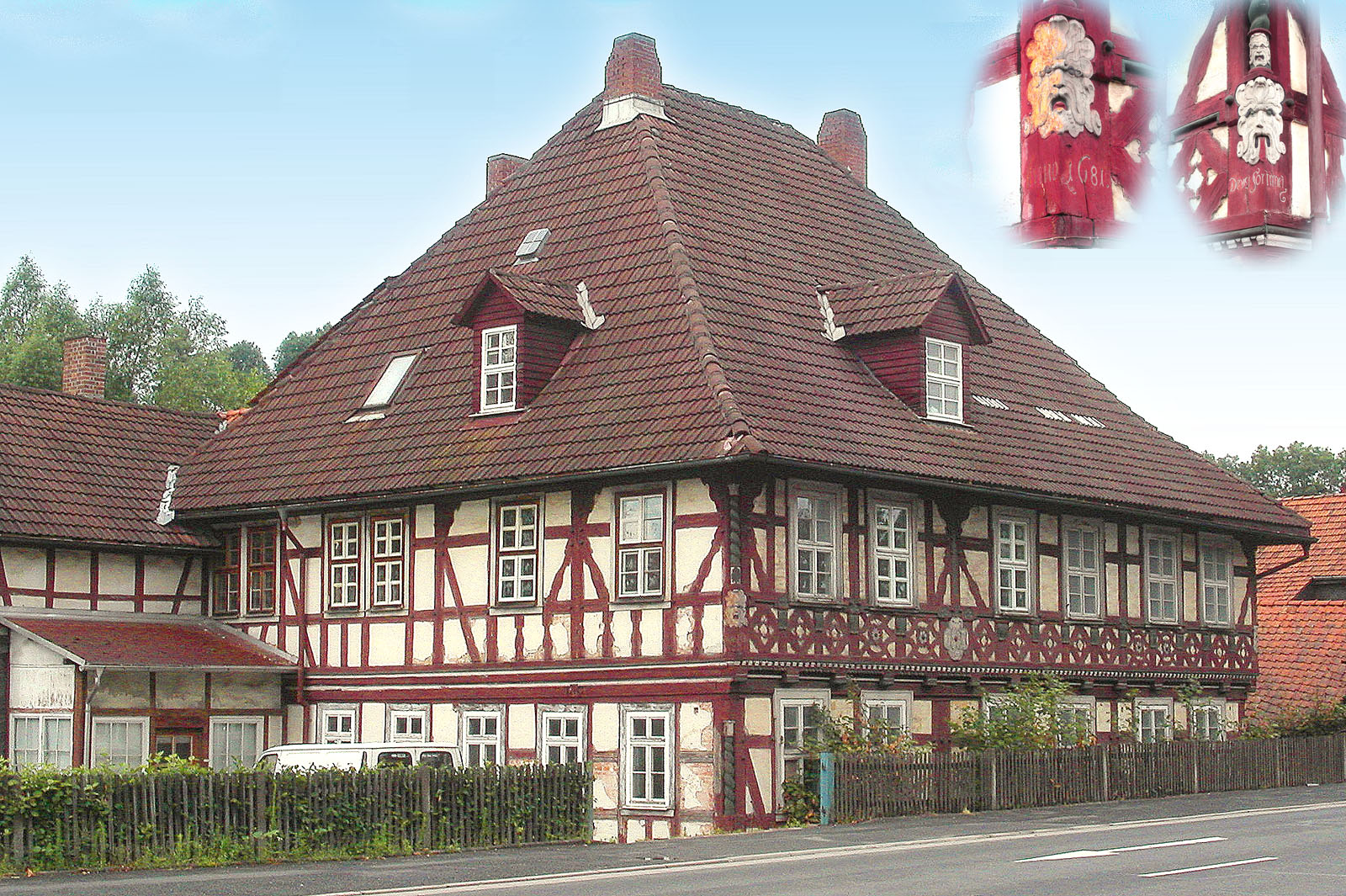
Teutsche Schule; built 1681, moved 1868
