= Schleuse =

River in Germany

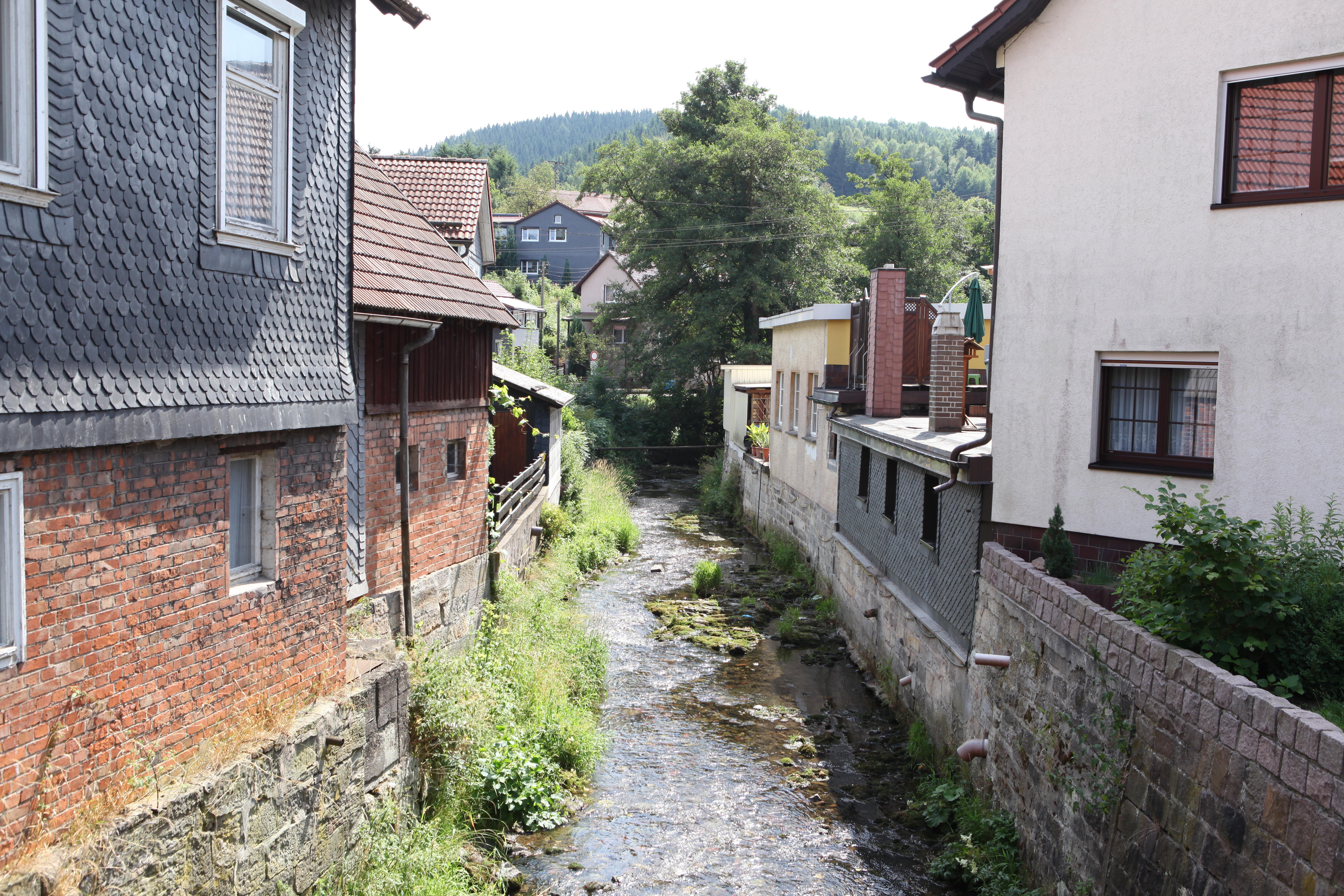

Location
- Country: Germany
- States: Thuringia

Physical characteristics
- Mouth
  - location: Werra
  - coordinates: 50.4907°N 10.6345°E

Basin features
- Progression: Werra→ Weser→ North Sea

Schleuse (German pronunciation: [ˈʃlɔʏzə]) is a river of Thuringia, Germany. It is a tributary of the Werra, which it joins in Kloster Veßra. The town Schleusingen lies on the Schleuse.

The river was first mentioned in writing in 1545. The name is a back-formation from the place name Schleusingen.

== See also ==
- List of rivers of Thuringia
