= Eisenach =

Town in Thuringia, Germany

- Town
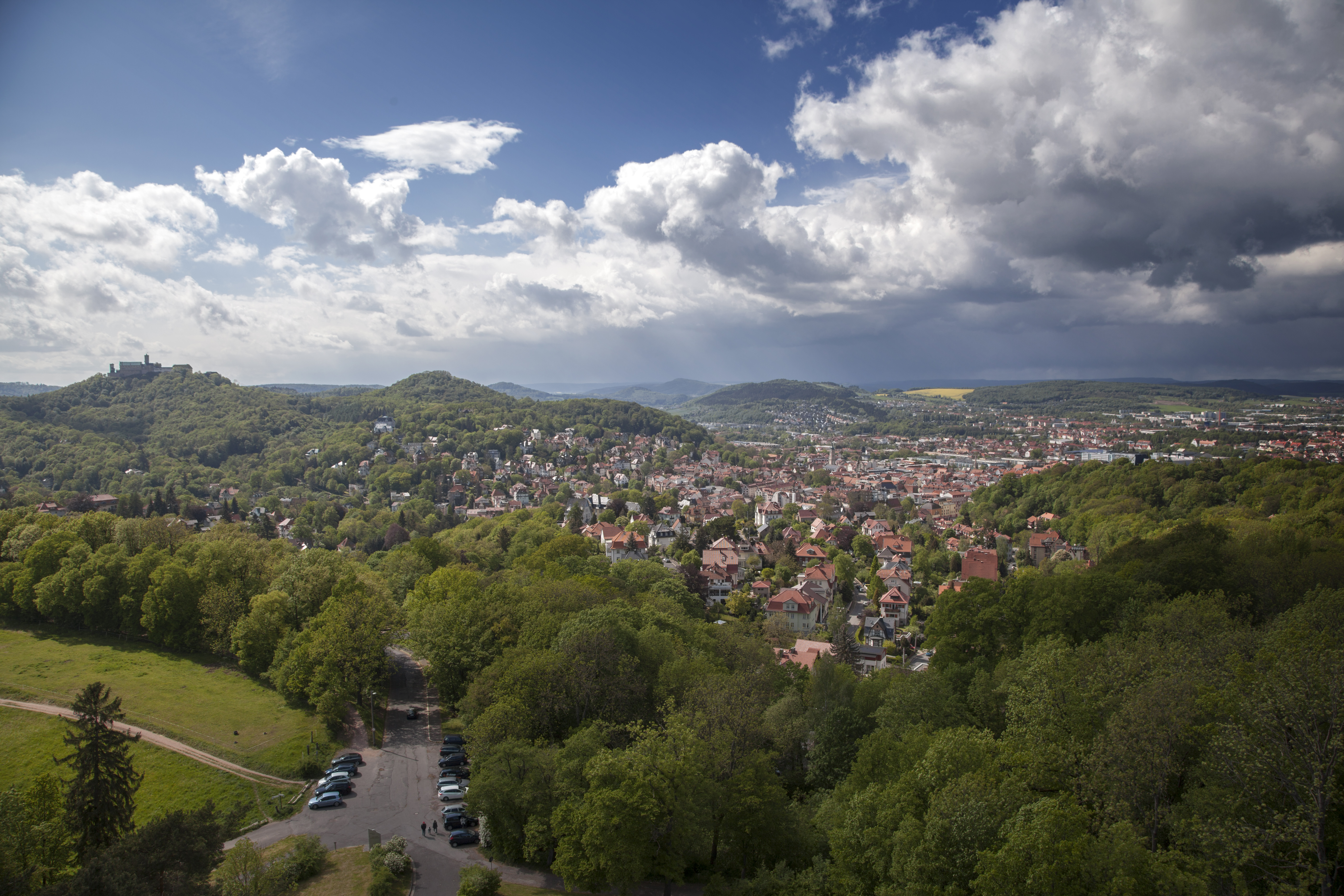
- View over Eisenach with Wartburg castle to the left

- Flag Coat of arms

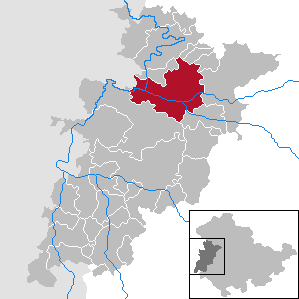
- Location of Eisenach within Wartburgkreis
- Interactive map of Eisenach
- Location within Germany Location within Thuringia
- Coordinates: 50°58′34″N 10°19′14″E
- Country: Germany
- State: Thuringia
- District: Wartburgkreis
- Subdivisions: 11

Government
  - Mayor (2024–30): Christoph Ihling (CDU)

Area
  - Total: 104.17 km^{2} (40.22 sq mi)
- Elevation: 215 m (705 ft)

Population (2025-12-31)
  - Total: 40,747
  - Density: 391.16/km^{2} (1,013.1/sq mi)
- Time zone: UTC+01:00 (CET)
  - Summer (DST): UTC+02:00 (CEST)
- Postal codes: 99817
- Dialling codes: 03691, 036920, 036928
- Vehicle registration: WAK, EA
- Website: www.eisenach.de

Eisenach (German pronunciation: [ˈaɪzənax]) is a town in Thuringia, Germany with 42,000 inhabitants, 50 kilometres (31 miles) west of Erfurt, 70 km (43 miles) southeast of Kassel and 150 km (93 miles) northeast of Frankfurt. It is the main urban centre of western Thuringia, and bordering northeastern Hessian regions, is near the former Inner German border. A major attraction is Wartburg castle, which has been a UNESCO World Heritage Site since 1999.

Eisenach was an early capital of Thuringia in the 12th and 13th centuries. St. Elizabeth lived at the court of the Ludowingians here between 1211 and 1228. Later Martin Luther came to Eisenach and translated the Bible into German. In 1685 Johann Sebastian Bach was born here. During the early modern period Eisenach was a residence of the Ernestine Wettins and was visited by numerous representatives of Weimar classicism like Johann Wolfgang Goethe. In 1869 the SDAP, one of the two precursors of the Social Democratic Party of Germany (SPD), was founded in Eisenach.

Car production is an important industry in Eisenach. The Automobilwerk Eisenach was founded in 1896. In the German Democratic Republic the Wartburg was produced here, before the factory was acquired by Opel in 1990.

Eisenach is on the Hörsel river, a tributary of the Werra between the Thuringian Forest in the south, the Hainich mountains in the north-east, and the East Hesse Highlands in the north-west. Since January 2021 it has been part of the Wartburgkreis.

== History ==
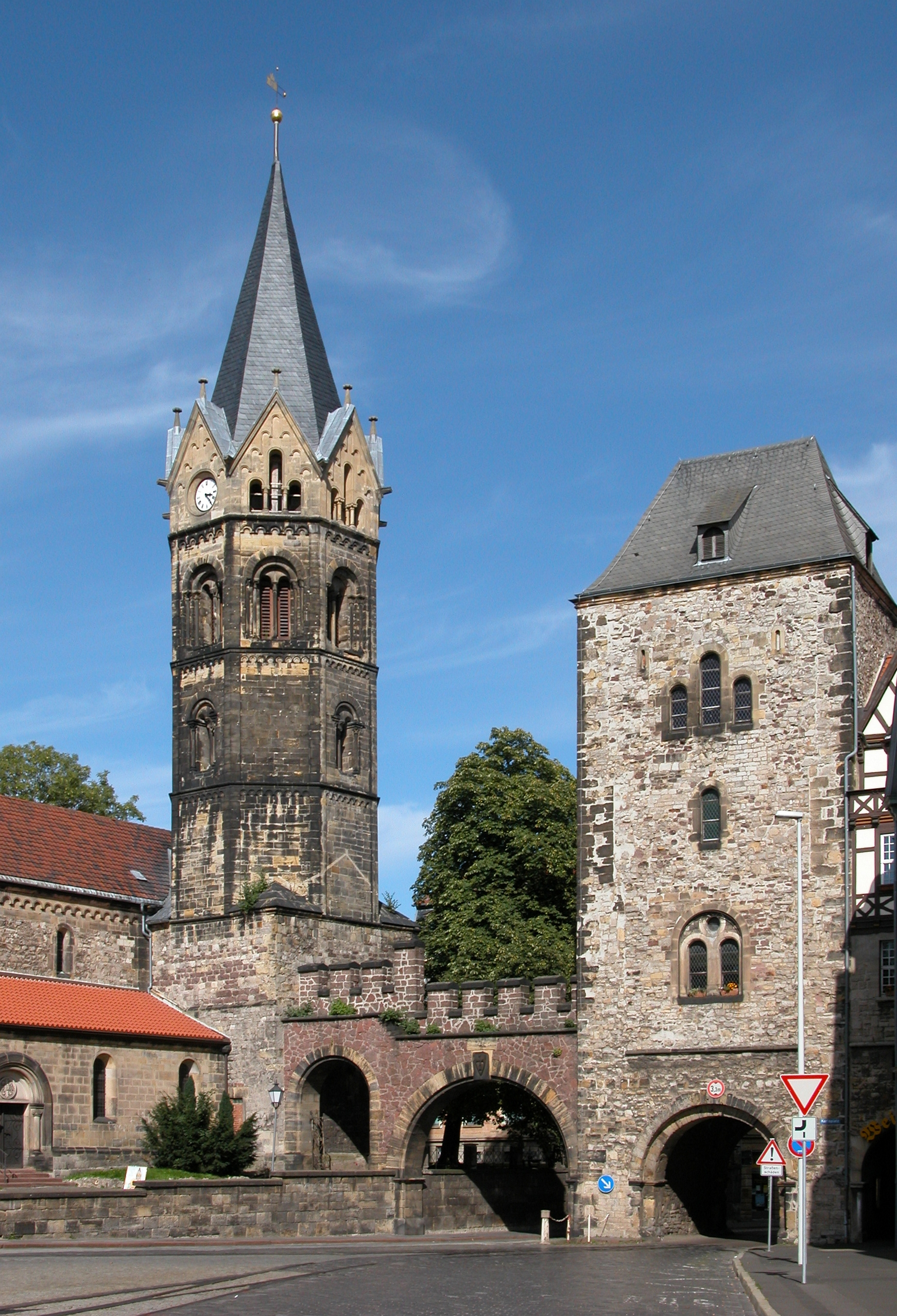
Nikolaikirche (left) and Nikolaitor (right)

=== Middle Ages ===
Eisenach's origin and early history is unknown. An 8th-century Frankish settlement near Petersberg hill is regarded as the nucleus of Eisenach; but there are no written sources about that early period. According to legend, Louis the Springer began in 1067 to establish Wartburg castle above the settlement.

In 1080 the castle was first mentioned in a Saxon chronicle. Eisenach itself followed in a document dating to 1150, where it was referred to as "Isinacha". During the 1180s the town was established by the construction of three independent market settlements around the Saturday market (today's Karlsplatz), the Wednesday market (today's Frauenplan), and the Monday market (today's Marktplatz). Due to its convenient location at a cross-roads between the Thuringian Forest in the south and the Hainich mountains in the north, Eisenach benefited from substantial east–west trade along Via Regia from Frankfurt to Erfurt and Leipzig, and became a rich merchant town. During the second half of the 12th century, the town walls were erected (the Nikolaitor is an important relict of this wall) and Eisenach got a planned grid of streets and alleys. In the late 12th century the Wartburg became the main residence of the Ludowingians, making Eisenach a leading place in today's western Thuringia and northern Hesse, which also belonged to the Ludowingian landgraviate. In 1207 the legendary Sängerkrieg supposedly took place at Wartburg castle.

In 1221 St Elizabeth married Landgrave Louis' IV and lived in Eisenach or at Wartburg castle until 1228. Later she became the patroness of Thuringia and Hesse.

In 1247 the Ludowingians died out, which led to the War of the Thuringian Succession between the Wettins and Duchess Sophie of Brabant. As a consequence the landgraviate was divided. Eisenach and the eastern parts went to the Wettins (later becoming Thuringia) and Kassel, Marburg, and the western parts went to Sophie (later becoming Hesse). Eisenach kept a leading position among the Wettin's Thuringian cities by becoming their Oberhof (leading court), so that their law had to be derived from Eisenach's municipal law and disputes had to be resolved here. The confident citizens of Eisenach fought against the Wettin's rule to become a free imperial city between 1306 and 1308, but lost. In the 14th century various crises followed: in 1342 a big fire destroyed nearly all the buildings, and the Black Death killed many inhabitants in 1349 and 1393. Since 1406 Eisenach was no longer a Wettin residence, which led to a decline in urban development. In 1485, in the "division of Leipzig", the town fell to the Ernestine line of the Wettins.

=== Early-modern period ===
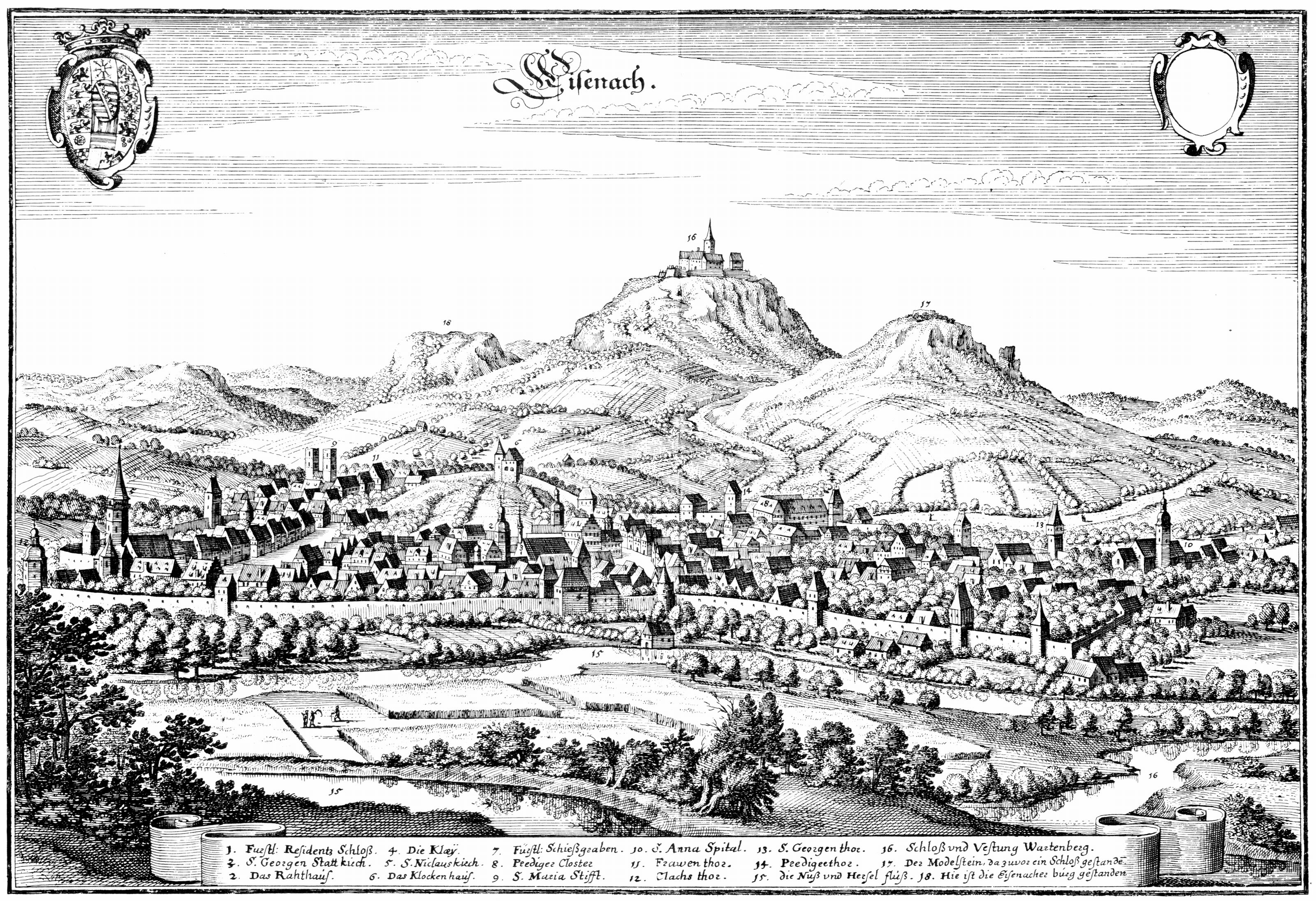
Eisenach in 1647

Between 1498 and 1501, the young Martin Luther attended the St. George's Latin school in Eisenach in preparation for his following studies at the University of Erfurt. In 1521/22 he was hidden by Frederick the Wise at Wartburg castle to protect him from the Imperial ban. During that time Luther translated the New Testament from Greek into German, in what was an important step both for the German Reformation and the development of a consistent German standard language.

Luther referred to Eisenach as ein Pfaffennest ("a clerical backwater"), since during his time there were 300 monks and nuns per 1,000 inhabitants.

In 1525 there was heavy fighting in the area during the Bauernkrieg. In 1528 the Lutheran Reformation was implemented in Eisenach. In 1596 Eisenach became a ducal residence again for the house of Saxe-Eisenach.

Johann Sebastian Bach was born in Eisenach in 1685, when it was a part of the Holy Roman Empire. His father, Johann Ambrosius Bach, worked there as a musician at that time. Other famous composers and musicians associated with Eisenach during that period were Johann Pachelbel, Johann Christoph Bach and Georg Philipp Telemann. As the Eisenach dukes died out in 1741, the town and the state became part of Saxe-Weimar. Nevertheless, the cultural life remained unimpaired. The coterie around the poet Julie von Bechtolsheim met up with famous personalities like Johann Wolfgang von Goethe and Christoph Martin Wieland in Eisenach.

From 1809 to 1918 Eisenach was part of the Duchy (after 1815 Grand Duchy) of Saxe-Weimar-Eisenach.

=== After 1815 ===
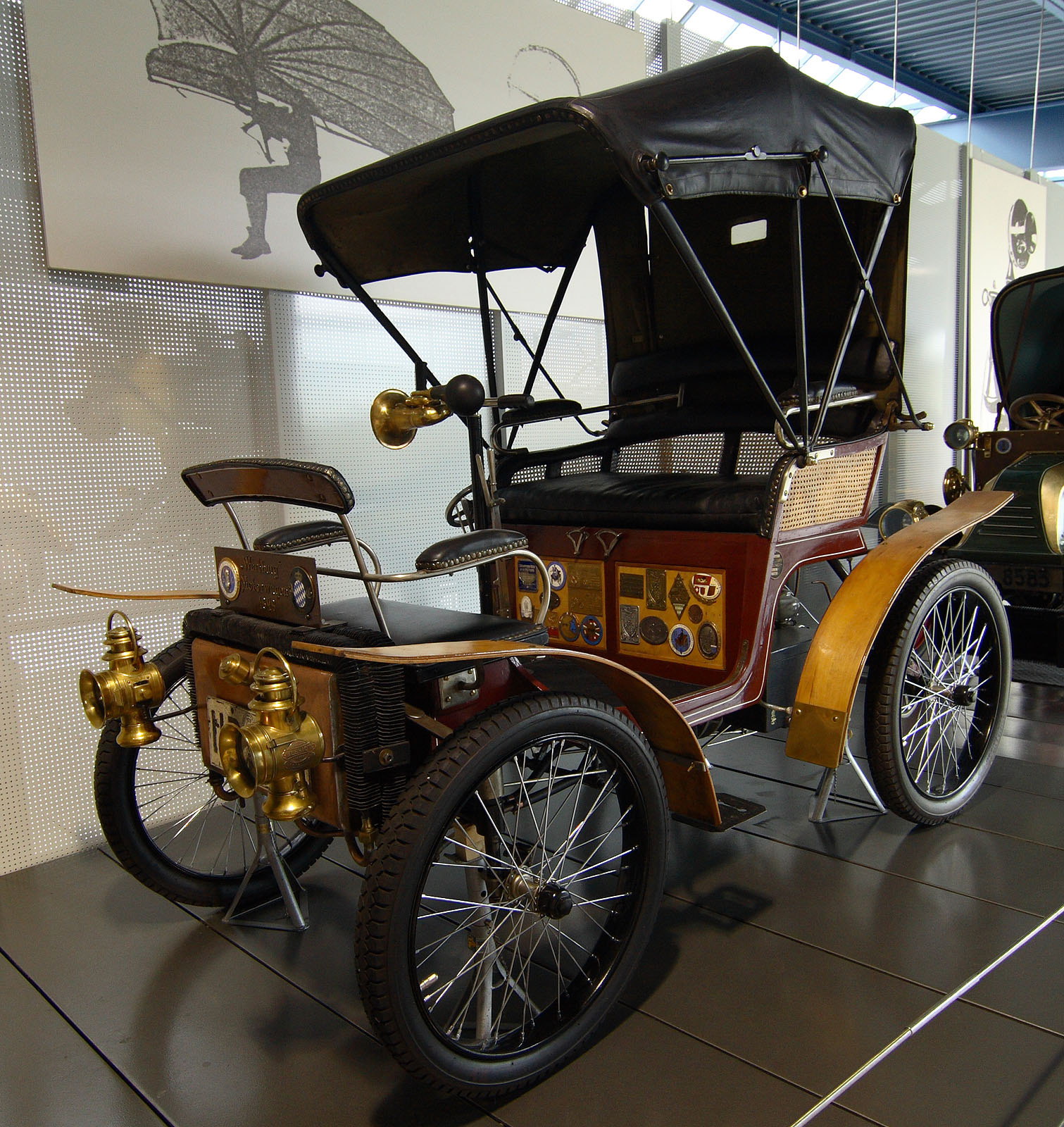
Car, produced in Automobilwerk Eisenach in 1898

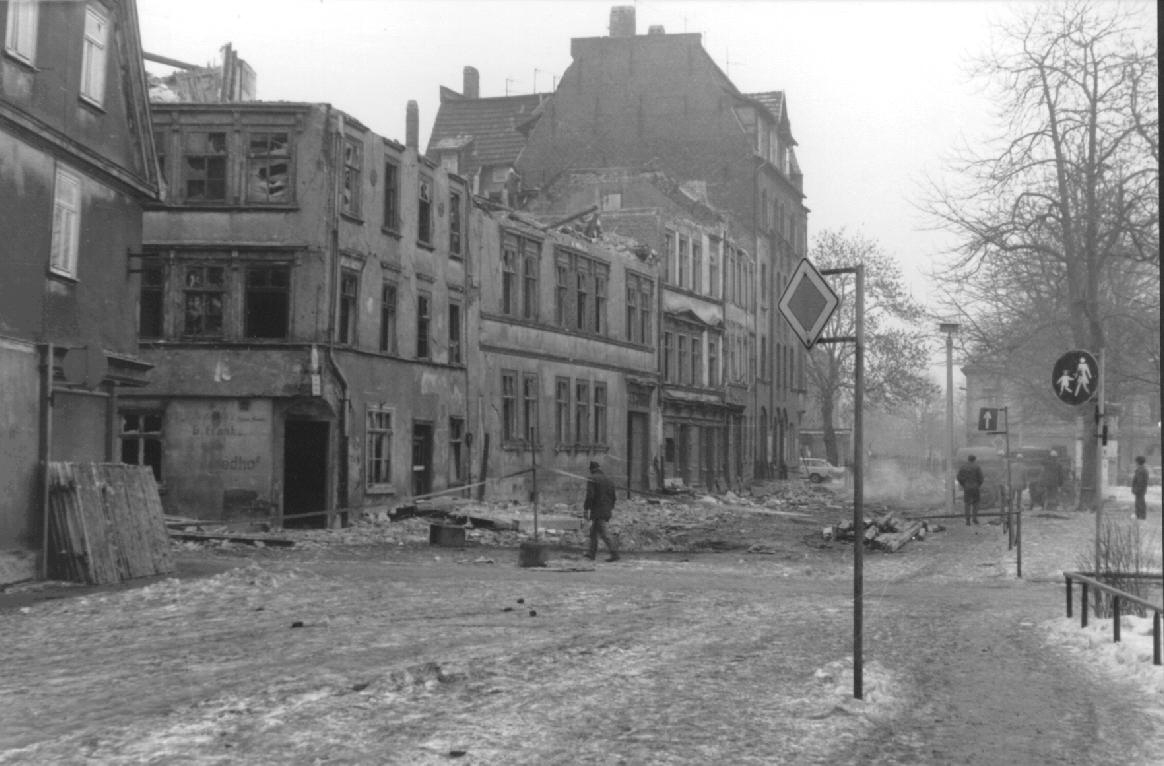
Demolition of historic buildings during the 1970s and 1980s

In 1817 the Wartburg Festival took place in Eisenach, a meeting of students advocating moves toward a more liberal, constitutional state and a unification of Germany. The industrial revolution started relatively early in Eisenach. As early as the first half of the 19th century the first factories were founded. In 1847 Eisenach was connected by the Thuringian Railway to Erfurt and Halle/Leipzig in the east and in 1849 to Kassel and Frankfurt in the west. In 1858 the Werra Railway to Lichtenfels (and further to Nuremberg) was opened.

In August 1869 the leading socialists August Bebel and Wilhelm Liebknecht founded the SDAP, one of the two predecessors of today's SPD in Eisenach. The Eisenach Program remained the party's main manifesto for the following years. The late 19th and early 20th century was the period with the fastest urban growth in Eisenach. The Fahrzeugfabrik Eisenach (FFE), later Automobilwerk Eisenach, the basis of car production in Eisenach, was founded in 1896, the first trams ran in 1897, the Burschenschaftsdenkmal ("fraternity monument") was erected in 1902, and the J. S. Bach museum opened in 1907. Tourists also started to arrive in this period, drawn by the pleasing landscape and the various sights within the town.

Between the 1860s and 1938 Eisenach was the home of one of the largest Jewish communities in Thuringia, with nearly 500 members at the beginning of the 20th century. Many Jews migrated from the Rhön area around Stadtlengsfeld to Eisenach after their emancipation in the early 19th century. The new synagogue was built in 1885 and destroyed by the Nazis during Kristallnacht in November 1938. Most Jews emigrated at that time; others were deported to concentration camps and murdered. During Nazi Germany the Institute for the Study and Elimination of Jewish Influence on German Church Life, an antisemitic propaganda institute, was set up in Eisenach by 11 German Protestant churches, founded at the instigation of the German Christian movement.

Before the Second World War, Bayerische Motoren Werke AG had produced motorcycles in the town. In preparation for World War II, new barracks were established in Eisenach and the car industry started the production of military equipment. After 1940 some 4000 forced labourers (most of them from the Soviet Union) were pressed to work in the town's factories, where some of them died due to the bad working conditions. Postwar, the managing director of the BMW aircraft engine works, Dr Schaaf, told the Fedden Mission there were as many as 11,000 working in the town, 4,500 in a plant inside a hillside turning out BMW 132 engines and parts for the 801, the rest in town. The bombings during the war destroyed about 2,000 housing units and big parts of the car factories, as well as some historic buildings in the town centre, which were rebuilt soon after the war. The US Army arrived in Eisenach on 6 April 1945, but the Soviets took over control of the town on 1 July 1945, making it Communism's westernmost major town.

Eisenach was part of the GDR after 1949. The Inner German border ran only ten kilometres west of Eisenach and was closed in 1952, cutting off parts of Eisenach's traditional hinterland. The location near the border inhibited the further development during the next 40 years and the population declined through that period. Nevertheless, Eisenach remained an important industrial location. The BMW car factory was socialized and under the new name EMW produced the Wartburg, the so-called "Mercedes of the East". The deteriorating condition of many historic houses led to a housing shortage during the 1970s. The government fought this by demolishing some historic quarters (e.g. at Jakobstraße) and rebuilding them with Plattenbau settlements. The biggest Plattenbau district was built at the northern periphery of Eisenach between 1978 and 1985, with nearly 4,000 housing units. In 1975 the tramway system was discontinued.

After German reunification in 1990 the economic situation changed. The car factory was taken over by Opel, whereas many other factories were closed. On the other hand Eisenach moved from the inner German border to the centre of the reunified country. Tourism saw significant growth and the Wartburg castle was designated a UNESCO World Heritage Site in 1999. Nevertheless the financial situation of Eisenach remained difficult, unemployment stayed above average, and car production suffered from the business problems of Opel.

== Geography and climate ==
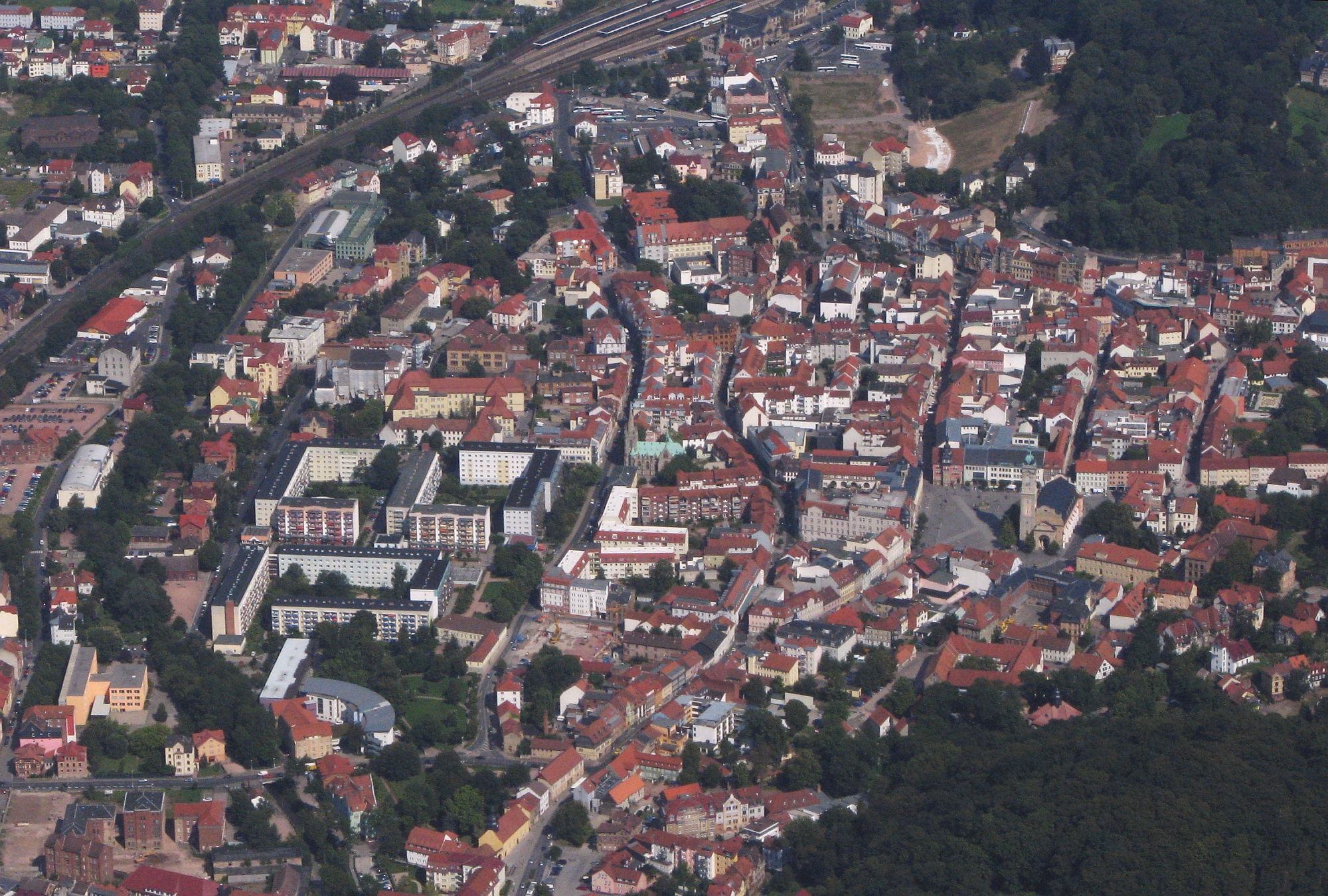
Eisenach's town centre, viewed from the west

=== Topography ===
Eisenach is at the northern edge of the Thuringian Forest, at an elevation of about 220 m. The terrain is hilly, and to the south also mountainous (up to 460 m of elevation), with the central Hörsel valley crossing the town in east–west direction. The Nesse river enters the Hörsel river in Eisenach after forming a valley through the spur of the Hörselberg mountains in the eastern municipal territory. The northern territory around the Neunkirchen, Stregda, and Hötzelsroda districts is relatively flat and in agricultural use. About 7 km (4 mi) west of the town centre runs the wide Werra valley, where the Hörsel river enters this bigger river near Hörschel district. The southern municipal territory is covered with forest, as are some smaller parts north of the Hörsel river. The Hainich mountains begin 10 km (6 mi) north-east of Eisenach.

=== Administrative division ===
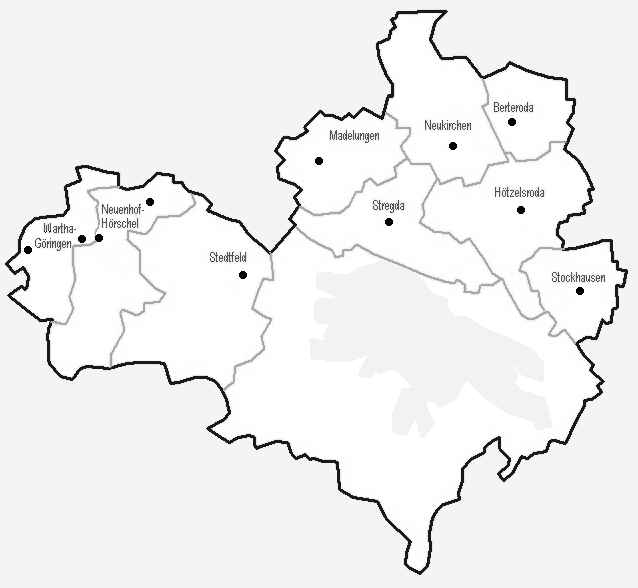
District map

Eisenach abuts the municipalities Krauthausen, Mihla, Lauterbach, Bischofroda and Berka vor dem Hainich in the north, Hörselberg-Hainich and Wutha-Farnroda in the east, and Marksuhl, Wolfsburg-Unkeroda, and Gerstungen in the south (all in the district Wartburgkreis) and Werra-Meißner-Kreis (Hesse, municipality of Herleshausen in the west). The municipal border between Eisenach and Herleshausen was part of the inner German border/Iron Curtain from 1949 to 1990.

The municipality of Eisenach includes the following rural districts (all of them incorporated in 1994), aside from the old town:

- Berteroda
- Göringen
- Hörschel
- Hötzelsroda
- Madelungen
- Neuenhof
- Neukirchen
- Stedtfeld
- Stockhausen
- Stregda
- Wartha

The village of Fischbach was incorporated in 1922 and is part of the inner town today.

=== Climate ===
Eisenach has a humid continental climate (Dfb) or an oceanic climate (Cfb), according to the Köppen climate classification system. Summers are warm and sometimes humid, and winters are relatively cold. The town's topography creates a microclimate with mostly adequate air circulation along the west-eastern valley, which made Eisenach a resort at the end of the 19th century. Annual precipitation is 831 millimeters (32.7 in) with moderate rainfall throughout the year. Light snowfall mainly occurs from December through February, but snow cover does not usually remain for long in the inner town valley.

== Demographics ==
Evolution of population since 1830

Eisenach has always been one of the larger towns in Thuringia, with 4,000 to 5,000 inhabitants during the Middle Ages. By 1800 the population rose to 8000 and further to 10,000 as industrialisation started around 1850. In 1875 the town had 16,000 inhabitants, and 30,000 in 1900, 43,000 in 1925, and more than 50,000 in 1940, the peak. Like most other east German mid-sized towns, Eisenach has had a shrinking population since 1950. It declined to 48,000 in 1990, 44,000 in 2000, and 42,000 in 2012. During 2009–2012 the annual change was −0.12%. Suburbanization played only a small role in Eisenach. It occurred after reunification for a short time in the 1990s, but most of the suburban areas are within the administrative town borders.

The birth deficit was 240 in 2012, or −5.7 per 1000 inhabitants (Thuringian average: −4.5; national average: −2.4). The net migration rate was +6.5 per 1,000 inhabitants in 2012 (Thuringian average: −0.8; national average: +4.6). The most important regions of origin of people who have moved to Eisenach are rural areas of Thuringia, as well as foreign countries like Poland, Russia, Ukraine, Hungary, Serbia, Romania, and Bulgaria.

Like other eastern German cities, only a small share of Eisenach's population is foreign: circa 2.3% are non-Germans by citizenship and overall 4.9% are classified as "migrants" (according to the 2011 EU census). Differing from the national average, the biggest groups of migrants in Eisenach are Vietnamese, Russians and Ukrainians.

Due to the official atheism of the former German Democratic Republic, most of the population is non-religious: 23.0% are members of the Evangelical Church in Central Germany and 4.4% are Catholics (according to the 2011 EU census).

== Economy ==
=== Agriculture, industry and services ===
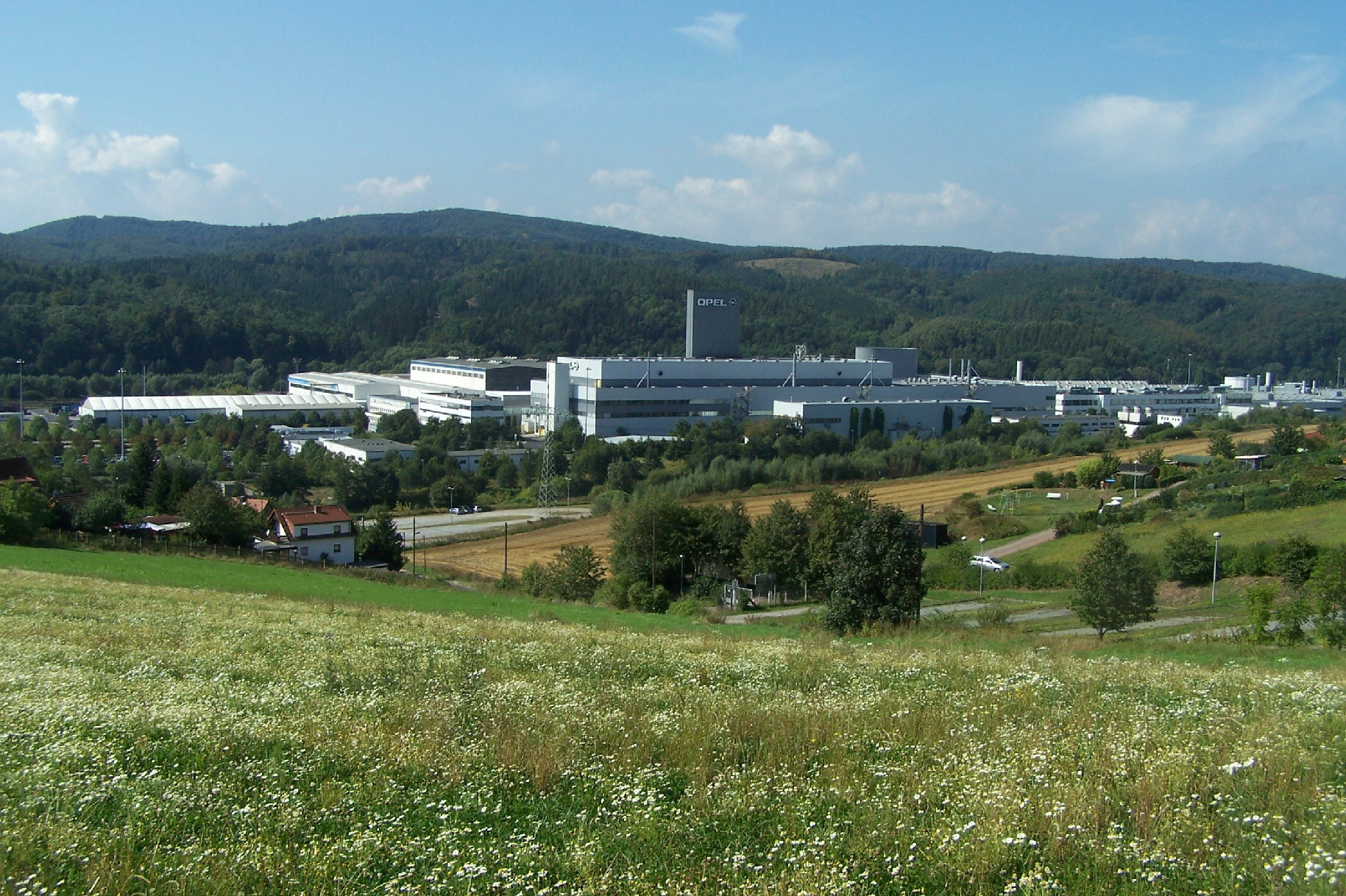
A factory of Opel, Eisenach's largest employer

The region around Eisenach is the part of Thuringia with the strongest economic base.

Agriculture is not very important in Eisenach, because of the hilly terrain, the less fertile soil, and the relatively humid climate, compared with central Thuringia further east. But 43% of the total municipal territory is in agricultural use, mostly as maize and rapeseed fields, or as cattle pasture.

The industrial structure is relatively focused on car production. The German auto manufacturer Opel built an entirely new plant in the northwest of the town, after the Wartburg car plant had ceased production in 1991. The new plant opened in 1992. Most other large manufacturers in Eisenach serve as suppliers for Opel, the largest among them is Bosch. BMW runs a factory in the neighbouring municipality of Krauthausen that supplies car parts. Another component supplier is "Truck-Lite Europe". In 2012 there were a total of 19 industrial companies with more than 20 workers in Eisenach, employing 5,600 people and generating a turnover of more than 1.8 billion euros. Of those employees, 3,000 work for just two companies (Opel and Bosch), underlining the dependence of Eisenach on the automotive industry.

Services in Eisenach are focused on tourism, with 166,000 overnight visitors spending a total of 311,000 nights in hotels in 2012. In addition, there are large numbers of (mostly German) one-day visitors.

Eisenach also provides services to the region (retail, hospitals, theatres, cinemas etc.).

During recent years the economic situation of the town improved: the unemployment rate declined from 17% in 2005 to 9% in 2013.

== Attractions ==
The Wartburg castle is, aside from Weimar, the most-visited tourist attraction in Thuringia. Further sights are:

=== Museums ===
Eisenach hosts a number of museums:

- The Bachhaus at Frauenplan was the first museum worldwide to be dedicated to the life and work of Johann Sebastian Bach, in 1906. It was established through the Neue Bachgesellschaft. The house is over 600 years old and stands near the site of the house in the Rittergasse, which is directly at the back of the museum, where Bach was probably born on 31 March 1685. Today a 2007 expansion has been added to the museum and it holds several artifacts and a variety of 18th and 19th century musical instruments.
- The Lutherhaus at Lutherplatz is one of the oldest half-timbered buildings remaining in Eisenach. Martin Luther is said to have lived here as a pupil during his school days in Eisenach from 1498 to 1501 as a guest of the Cotta family. The building was destroyed in a fire in 1944 but had been completely rebuilt by 1966. Currently this house is a museum featuring multimedia exhibits relating to the period. The museum is split into five parts illustrating Luther's life and times as well as his teachings.
- Automobile Welt at Friedrich-Naumann-Straße exhibits the tradition of car production in Eisenach since 1898. It includes the Wartburg cars of 1899–1991, AWE racing cars from 1956 and classic BMW cars.
- The Thüringer Museum inside the palace at Marktplatz is the art-historical museum of Eisenach and has a collection focusing on porcelain and art handicrafts.
- The Reuter-Wagner-Museum at Reuterweg hosts an exhibition on the poet Fritz Reuter and the composer Richard Wagner. Built by Ludwig Bohnstedt between 1866 and 1868, this neo-renaissance house was the home of Fritz Reuter, a well-known poet of the Low German dialect, from 1868 until his death in 1874. Reuter's home was acquired by the town in 1895 and turned into a memorial. That same year the collection of Nicolaus Oesterlein containing several thousand books on Richard Wagner (virtually the complete primary and secondary literature on Wagner of the 19th century) was added. Since 1997, this collection—the second largest in the world after Bayreuth—has been presented in a new exhibit on the ground floor, which also includes all the material on Tannhäuser, an opera set at the Wartburg.
- The museum inside the Predigerkirche at Predigerplatz hosts the medieval art division of the Thüringer Museum.
- The Goldener Löwe at Marienstraße shows an historical exhibition of German social democracy. On 7 August 1869 the Social Democratic Worker's Party (later to become the Social-Democratic Party of Germany) was founded at this site. The "August Bebel Society" offers lectures and seminars on topics of historical and current political interest.
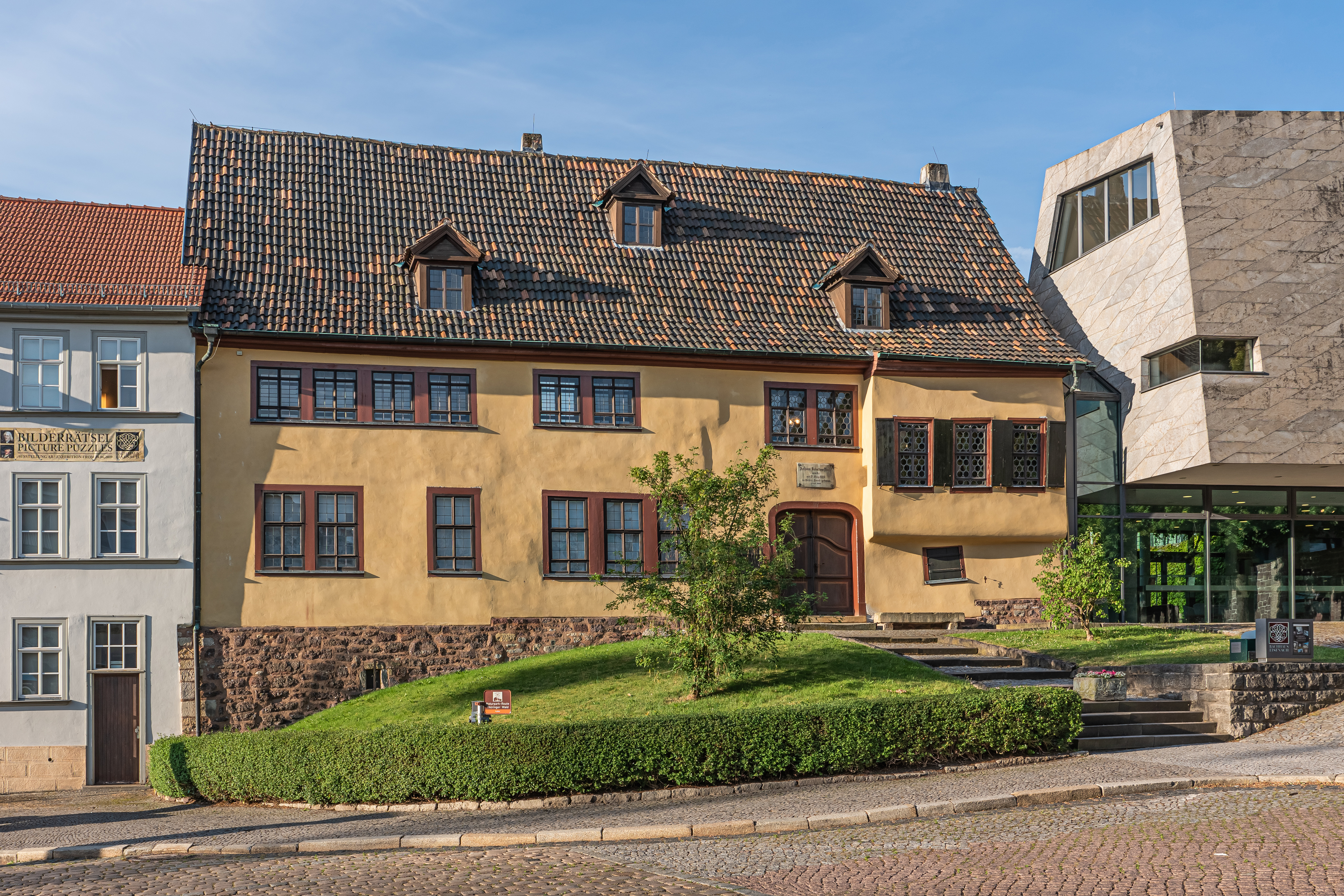
Bachhaus

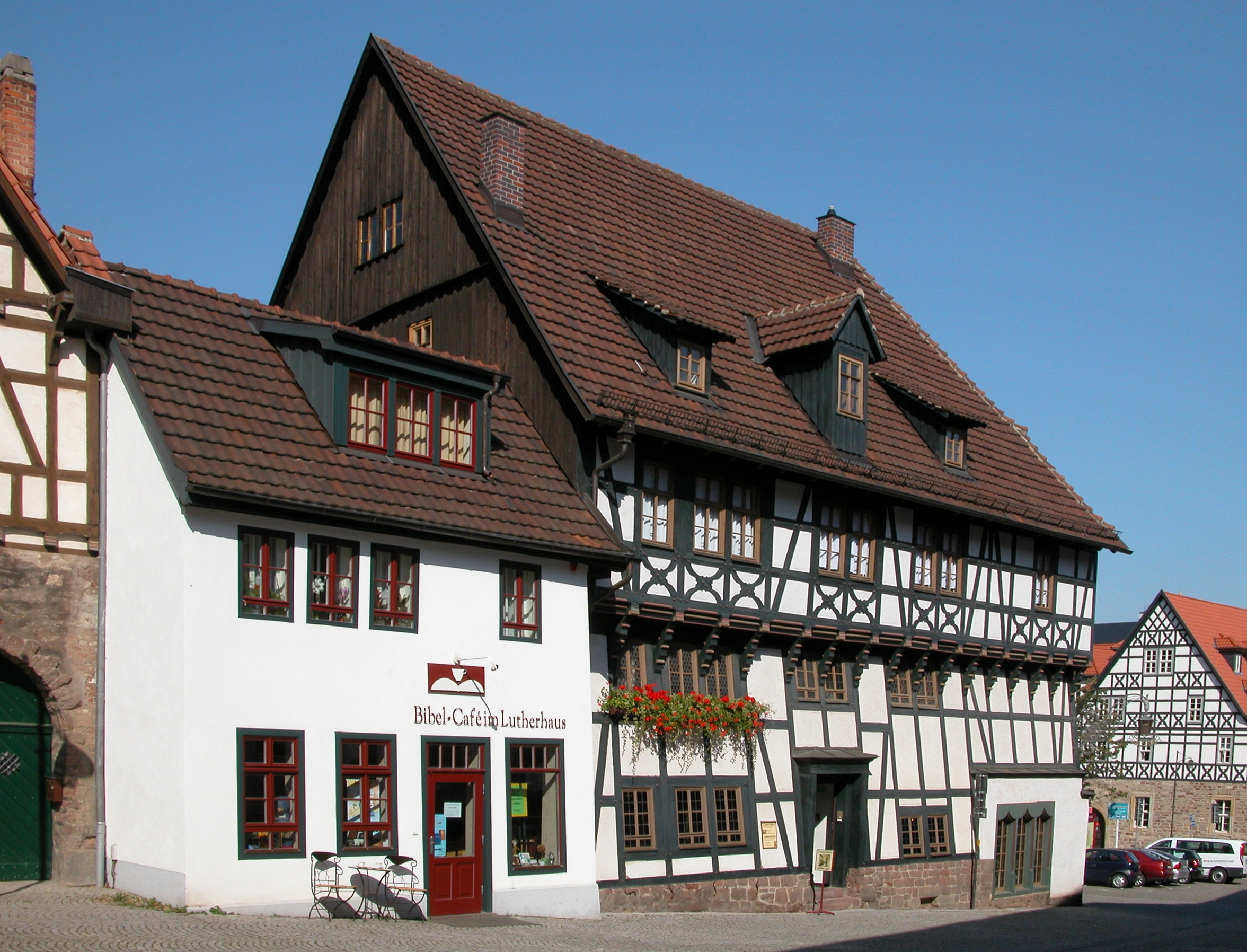
Lutherhaus

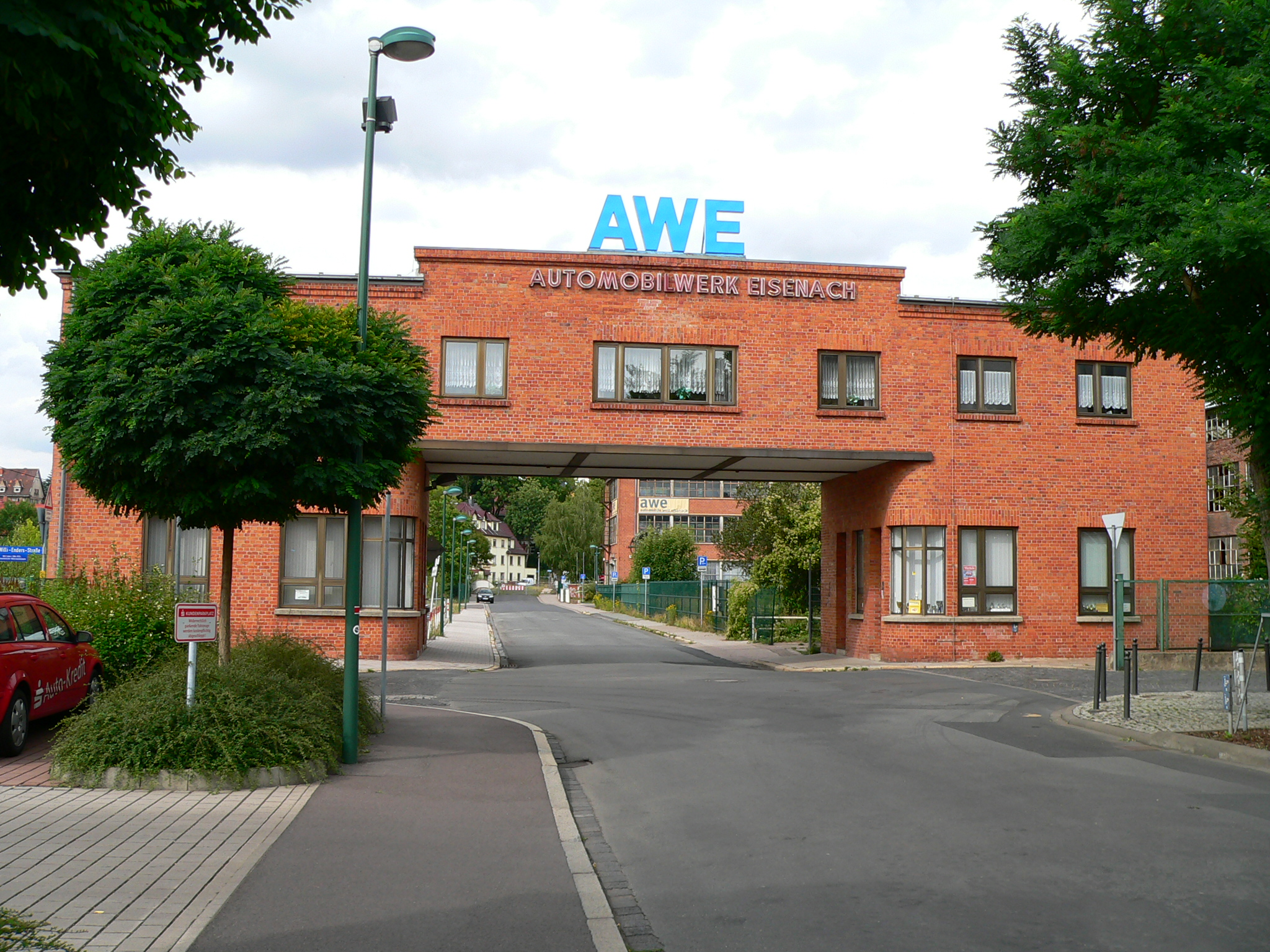
"Automobile Welt"

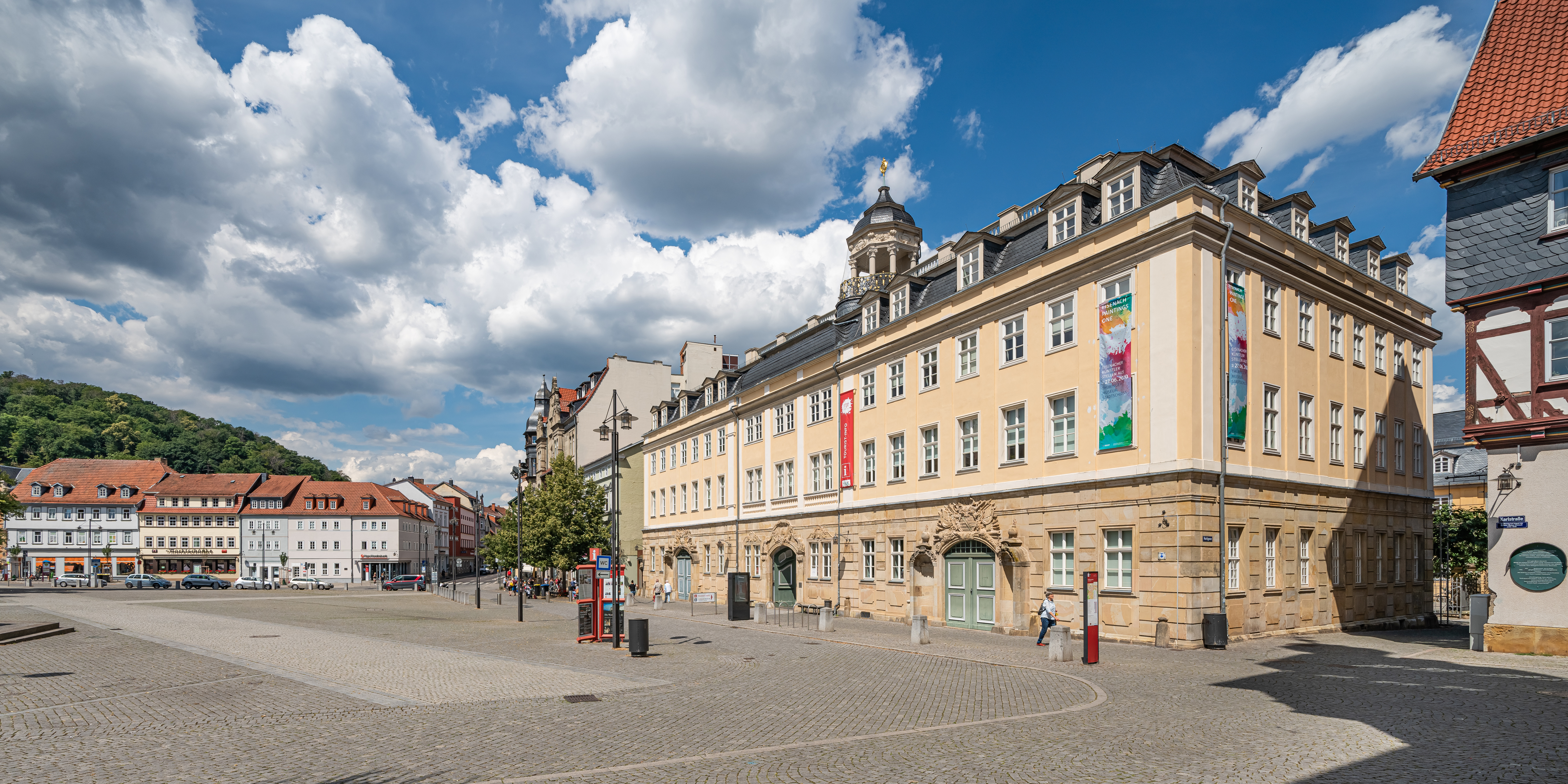
Thüringer Museum inside the palace

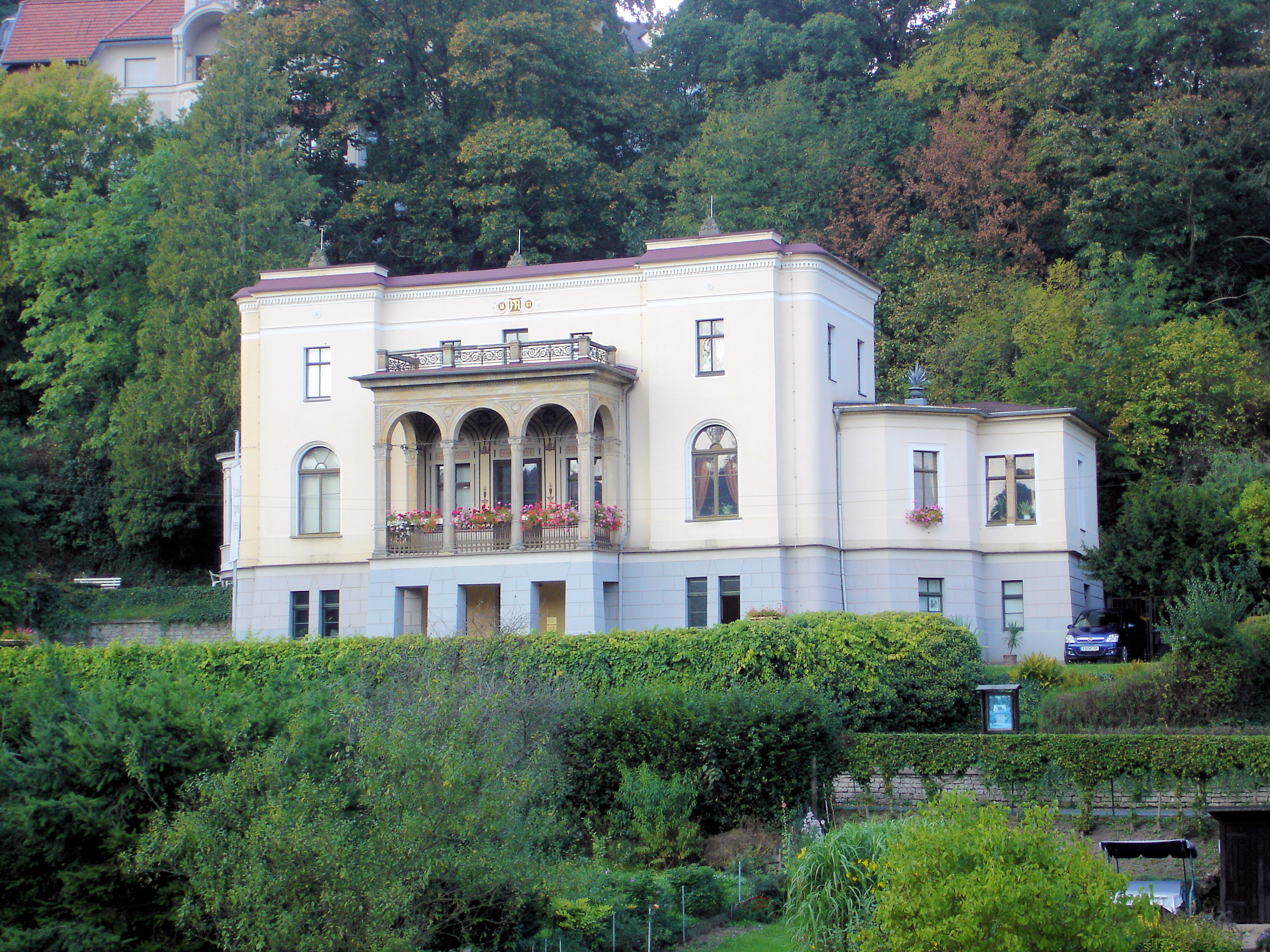
Reuter-Wagner-Museum

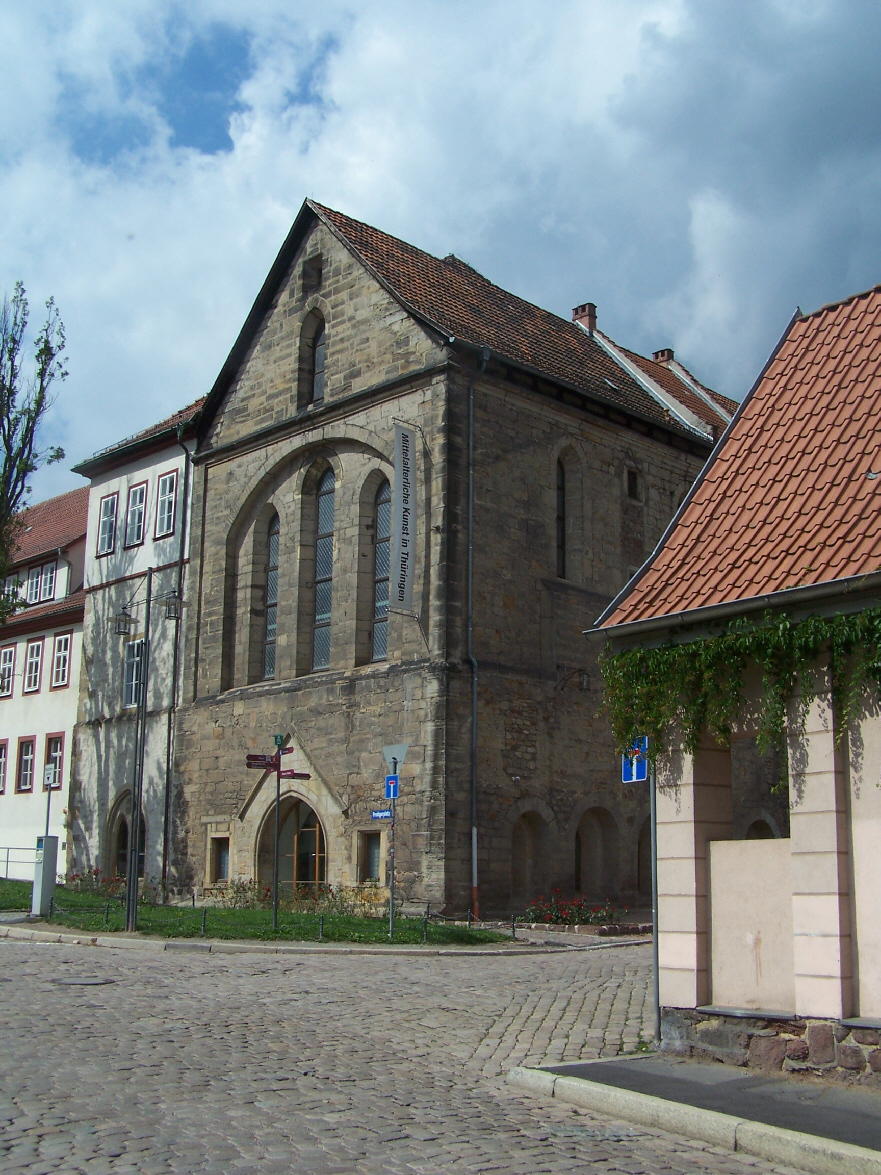
Predigerkirche

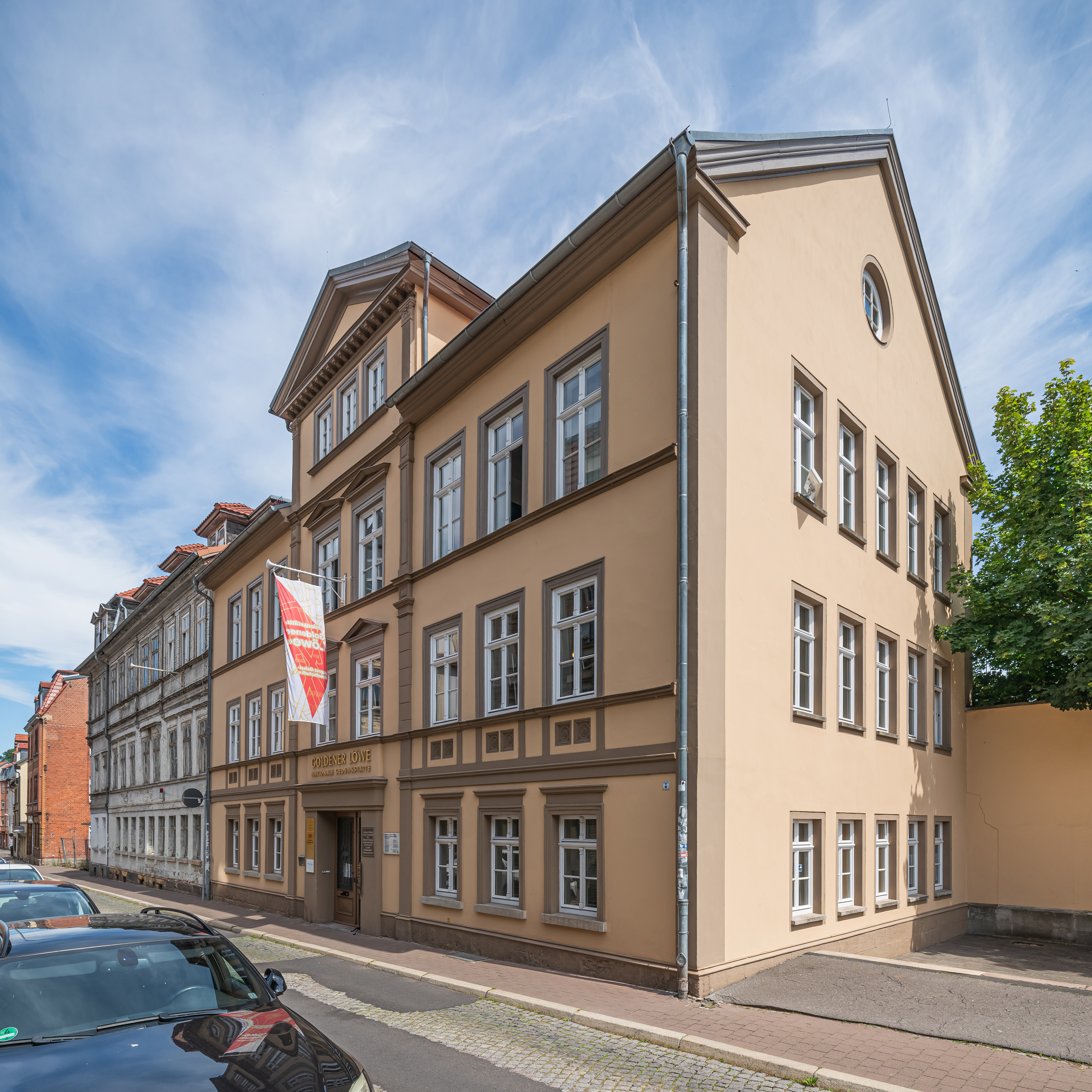
Goldener Löwe

=== Townscape ===
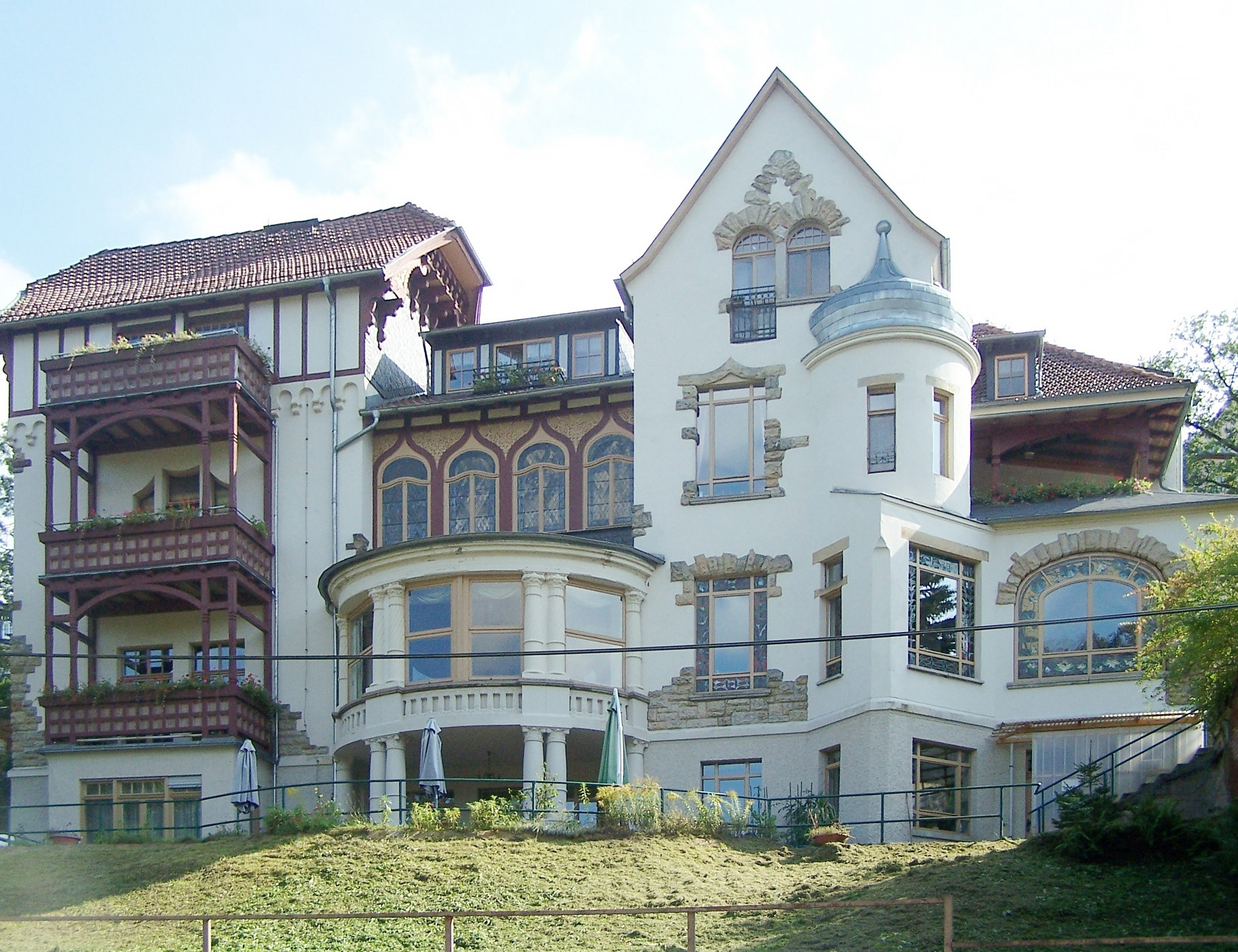
Typical example of mansion architecture in the southern town

The town of Eisenach developed during the Middle Ages at the exit of Mariental valley, opening to the Hörsel valley around Marktplatz, Karlsplatz and Frauenplan in a triangle structure. The early-modern period brought extensions to the west (Katharinenstraße), to the north (Jakobstraße) and to the east (in front of Nikolaitor gate). The construction boom between 1850 and 1914 led to a strict division in urban development. South of the historic centre, mansion districts were established on the hillsides of Mariental valley, where the rich factory owners, rentiers and other upper-class people lived. These districts are among the most important examples of this urban type in Germany, and one of the largest in Europe. North of the historic centre, next to the railway and Hörsel river, factories and worker quarters were established. These also host some examples of interesting Gründerzeit architecture. After World War I, the town extended further to the north on the other bank of Hörsel river, where some new residential areas were developed before 1990.

==== Square ensembles ====
- Karlsplatz: adjoins the Nikolaikirche (Church of St. Nicholas) and the Romanesque Nikolaitor (St. Nicholas Gate), the only surviving town gate (out of five). The square is seen as the nucleus of the town, it was first mentioned in 1368.
- Marktplatz: the market square with the Georgenkirche (Church of St. George), the town hall, the Baroque Stadtschloss, as well as a number of highly decorative administration buildings and merchants' houses. It also features the gilded market fountain designed by Hans Leonardt in 1549, showing St. George, the patron saint of Eisenach.
- Jakobsplan: named after a chapel destroyed by fire in the Middle Ages. Jakobsplan comprises a monument to St. George in the centre of the square, part of the old town walls (including one of the watch towers), and the Goethe Garden.
- Frauenplan: a small courtyard-type square that takes its name from the "Church of Our Lady". The church was demolished for defence purposes in 1306. Today Frauenplan is the location of the Bachhaus and the Bach monument in front of it.

=== Sights and architectural heritage ===
==== Churches ====
- St. George's Church (Lutheran) at the market square was first built in the 12th century. The church in which St. Elisabeth was married was demolished in 1515 and replaced by a new structure. Martin Luther held a sermon there on 2 May 1521. In 1525, the church was heavily damaged during the Bauernkrieg and during the Reformation it served as a stables. It was rededicated in 1558. On 23 March 1685, Johann Sebastian Bach was baptized in the church (the 16th century baptismal font still remains). The tower was added in 1898–1902.
- St. Nicholas' Church (Lutheran), located on the Karlsplatz, served the Benedictine convent once located in the area. This triple-naved basilica was built in 1180. It is considered the latest example of Romanesque architecture in Thuringia.
- Preachers' Church (secularized) at Predigerplatz was part of a former Dominican monastery (founded in 1240 and the only monastery buildings of which remain in the town), today used as a museum for medieval art.
- St. Elizabeth's Church (Roman Catholic) at Sophienstraße is the Catholic parish church of Eisenach, built in neo-Gothic style in the 1880s.
- St. Anne's Church (Lutheran) at Georgenstraße was founded together with a hospital by St. Elizabeth in 1226.
- St. Clement's Chapel (Lutheran) at Clemensstraße is a small 13th century Romanesque chapel.
- Holy Cross Church (secularized) at the old cemetery was built in the 1690s.
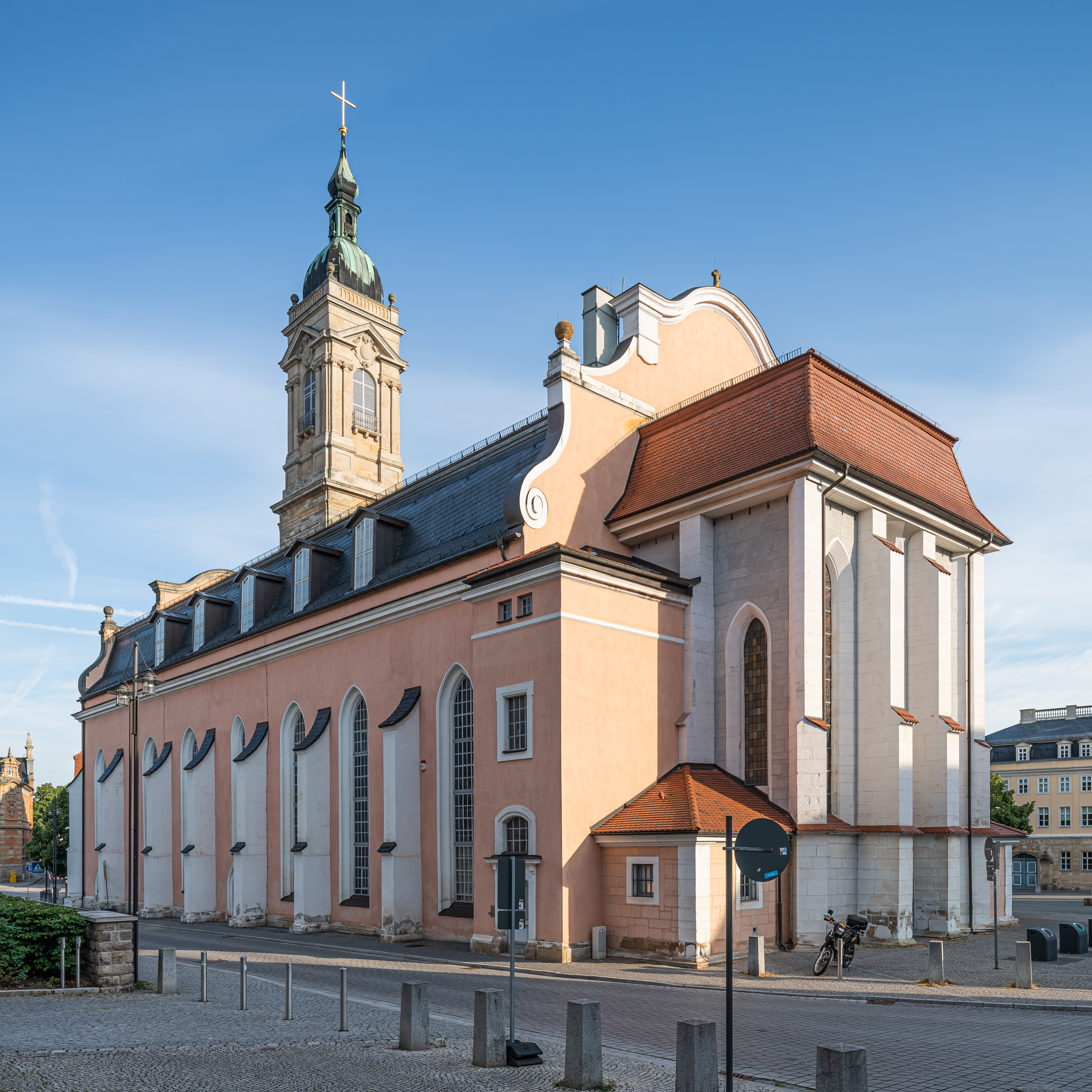
St. George's Church

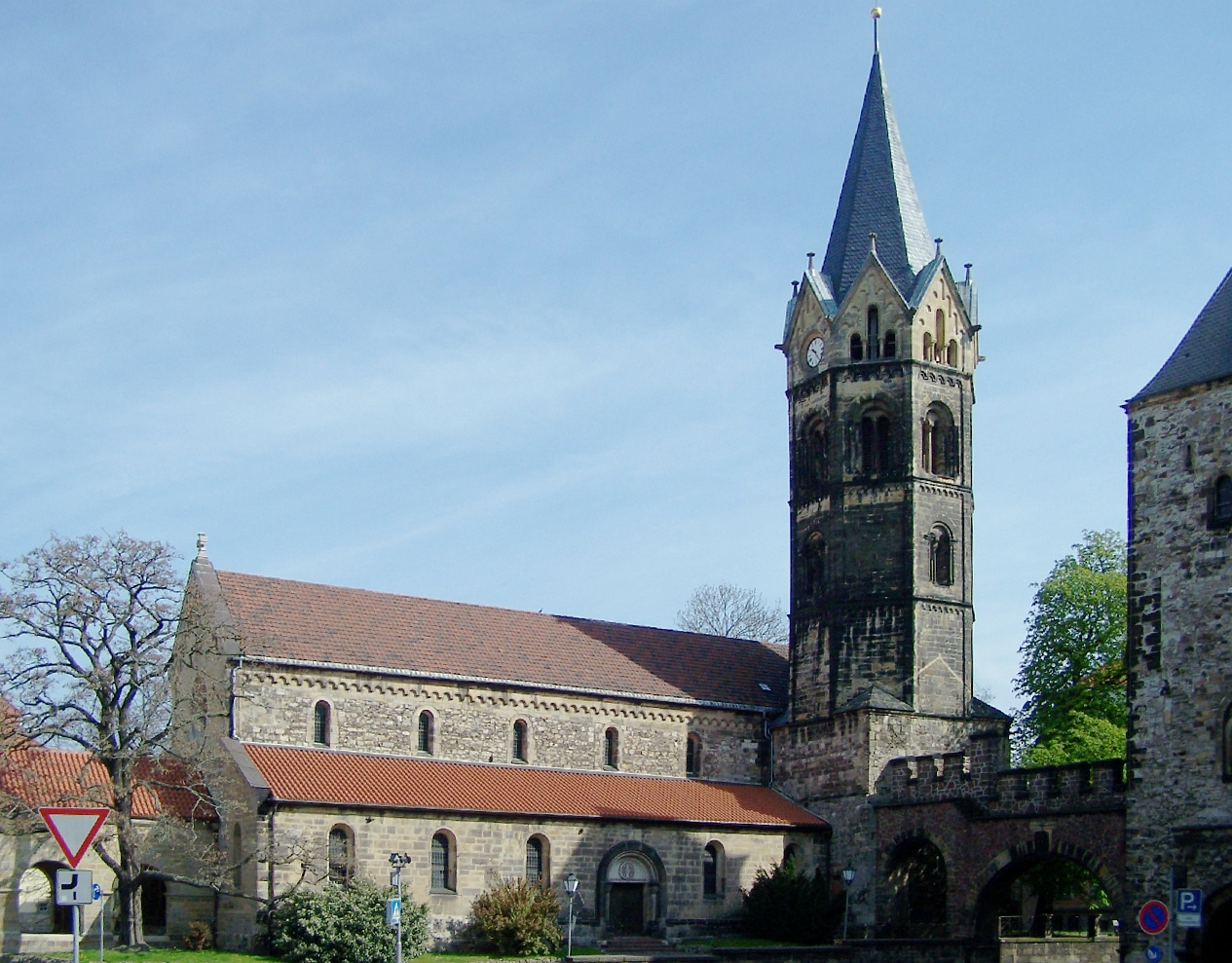
St. Nicholas' Church

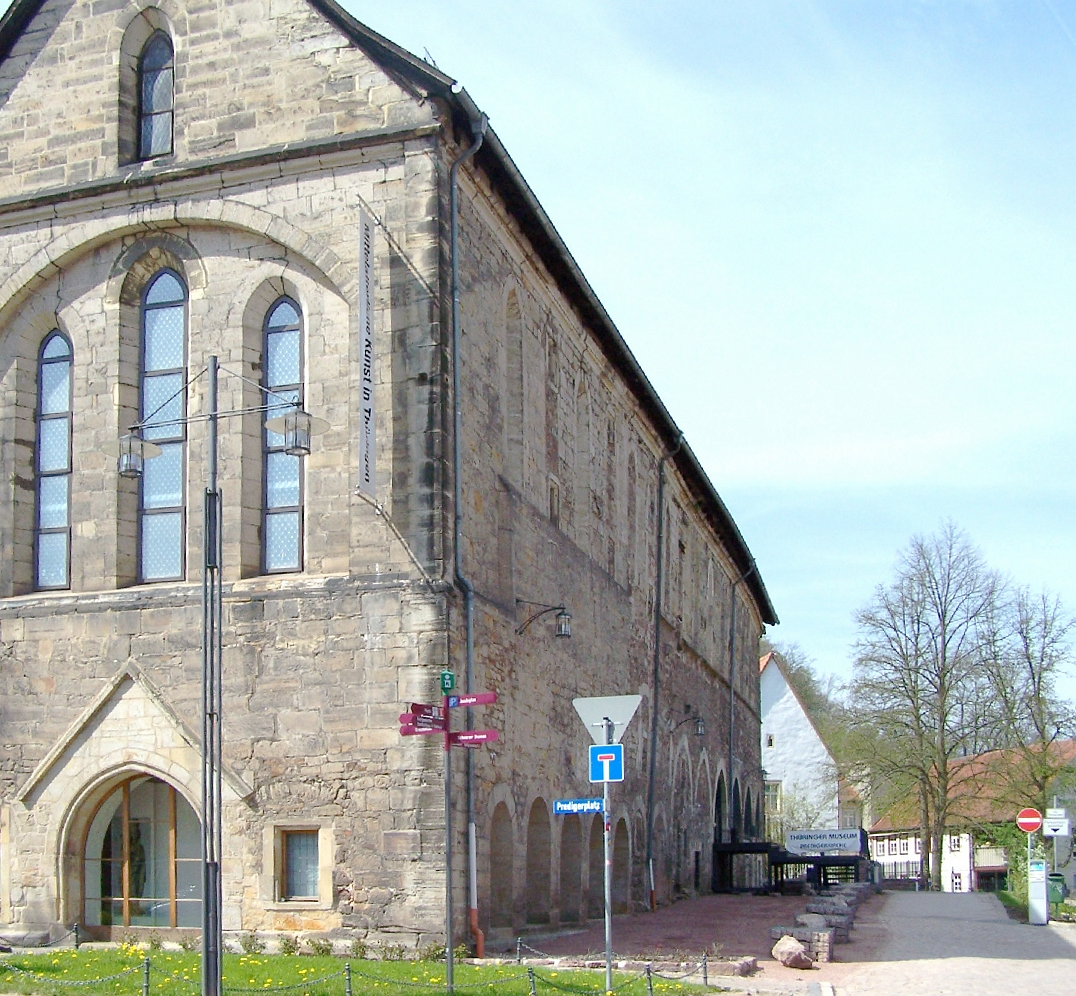
Preachers' Church

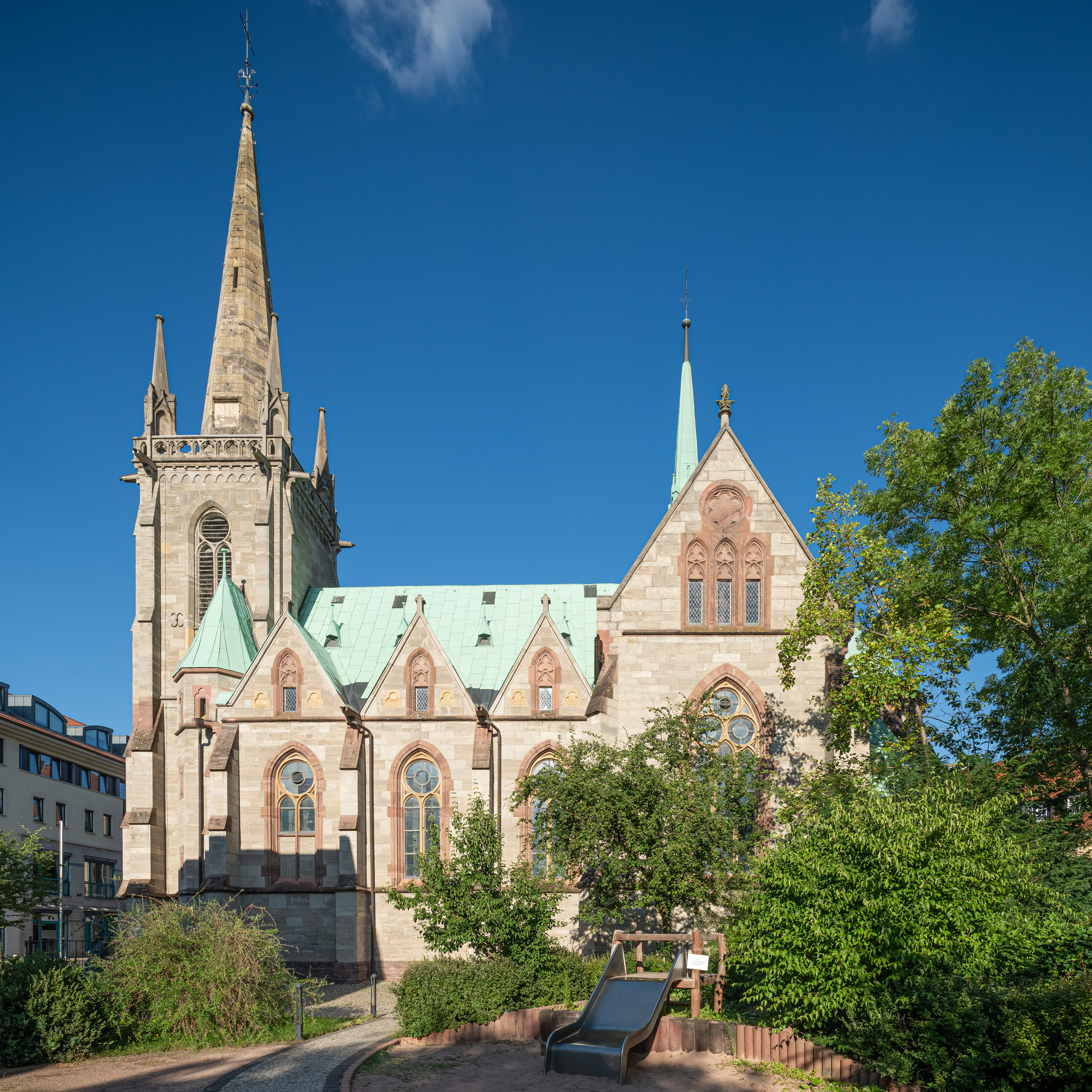
St. Elizabeth's Church

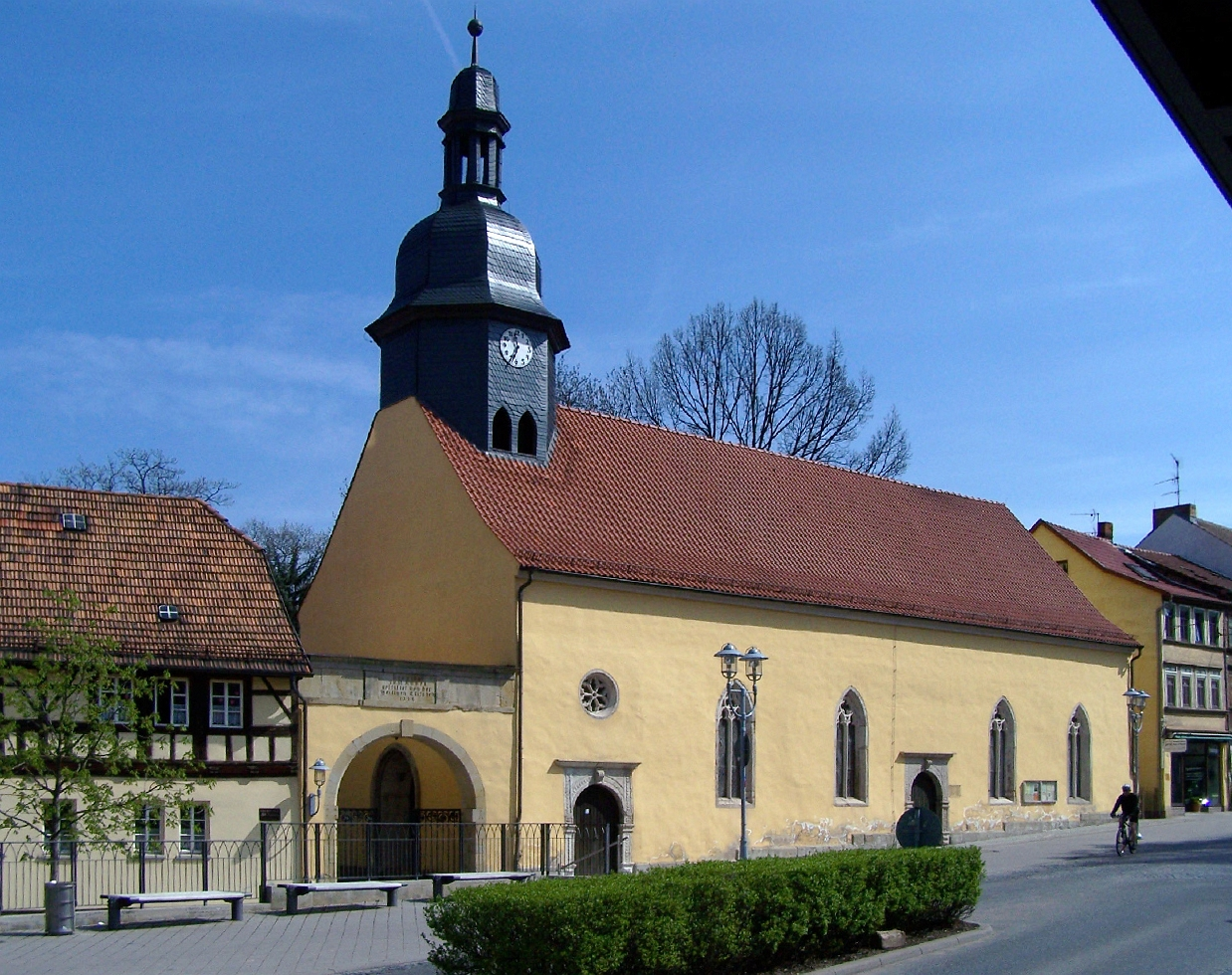
St. Anne's Church

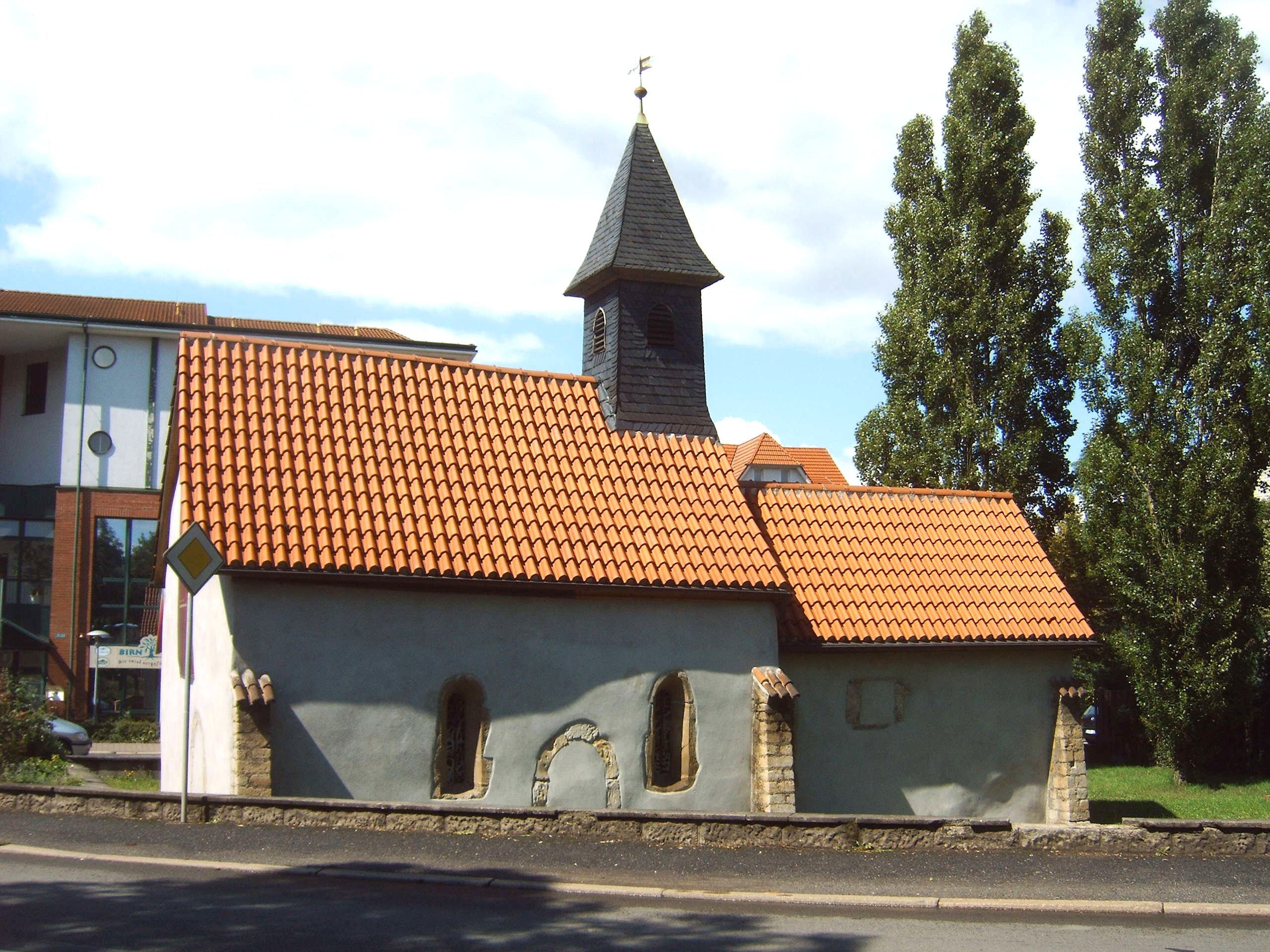
St. Clement's Chapel

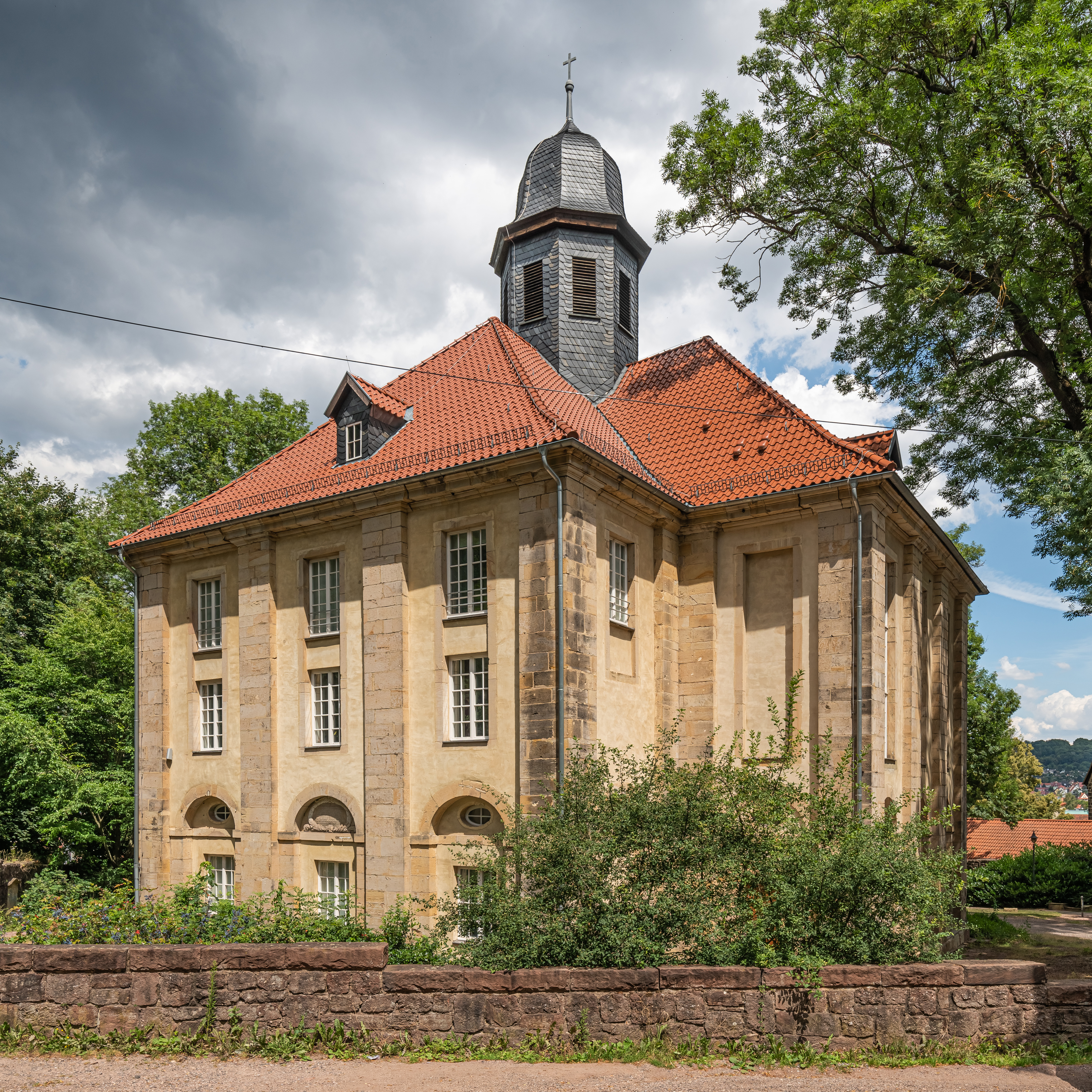
Holy Cross Church

==== Castles and palaces ====
- The most important castle is the Wartburg above the town. For further information, see: Wartburg.
- The Stadtschloss (town palace) is situated at the north end of the Marktplatz and was built between 1742 and 1745. This palace was constructed to the plans of Gottfried Heinrich Krohne, architect of Duke Ernst August I of Saxe-Weimar. After 1777 Johann Wolfgang von Goethe frequently stayed here in his capacity as the duke's prime minister. Today the Stadtschloss acts as a venue for special exhibitions and as a museum for artistic and historical artifacts from Thuringia.
- Hellgrevenhof at Georgenstraße is part of a former inner-town castle, named after Heinrich Hellgreve, a rich citizen who lived here in the late 13th century. It consists of five buildings, the oldest dating to around 1200, although it has been modified several times over the centuries.
- Bechtolsheim Palace at Jakobsplan is a neoclassical palace, built in the late 18th century.
- Schloss Fischbach in Fischbach district is a small 17th-century castle.
- Jagdschloss Hohe Sonne is a hunting lodge south of the city in the Thuringian Forest. It was built in the mid-18th century in the Baroque style.
- Alte Residenz at Esplanade is the relic of the former ducal residence, rebuilt in the Renaissance style after older predecessors.
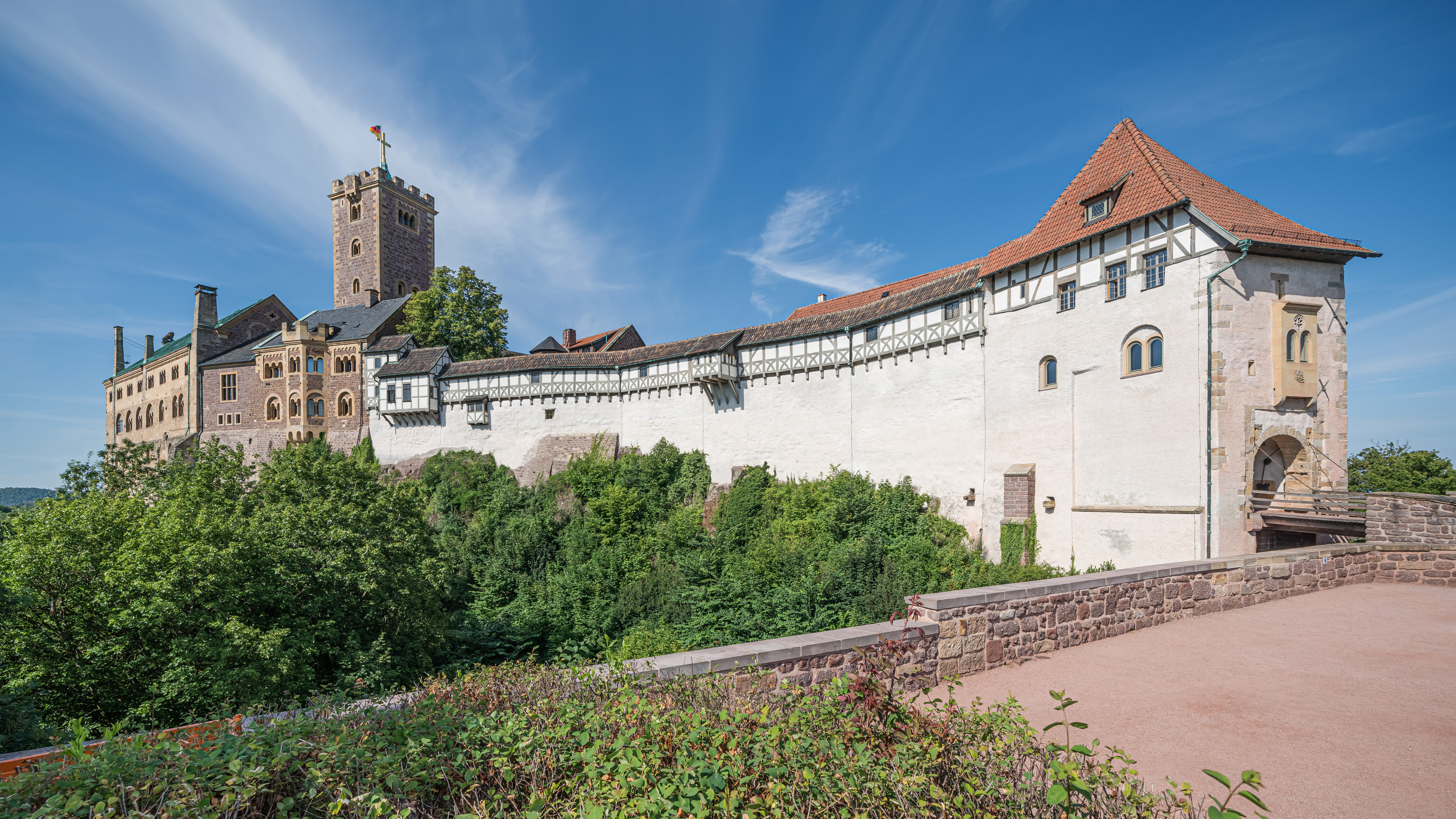
Wartburg

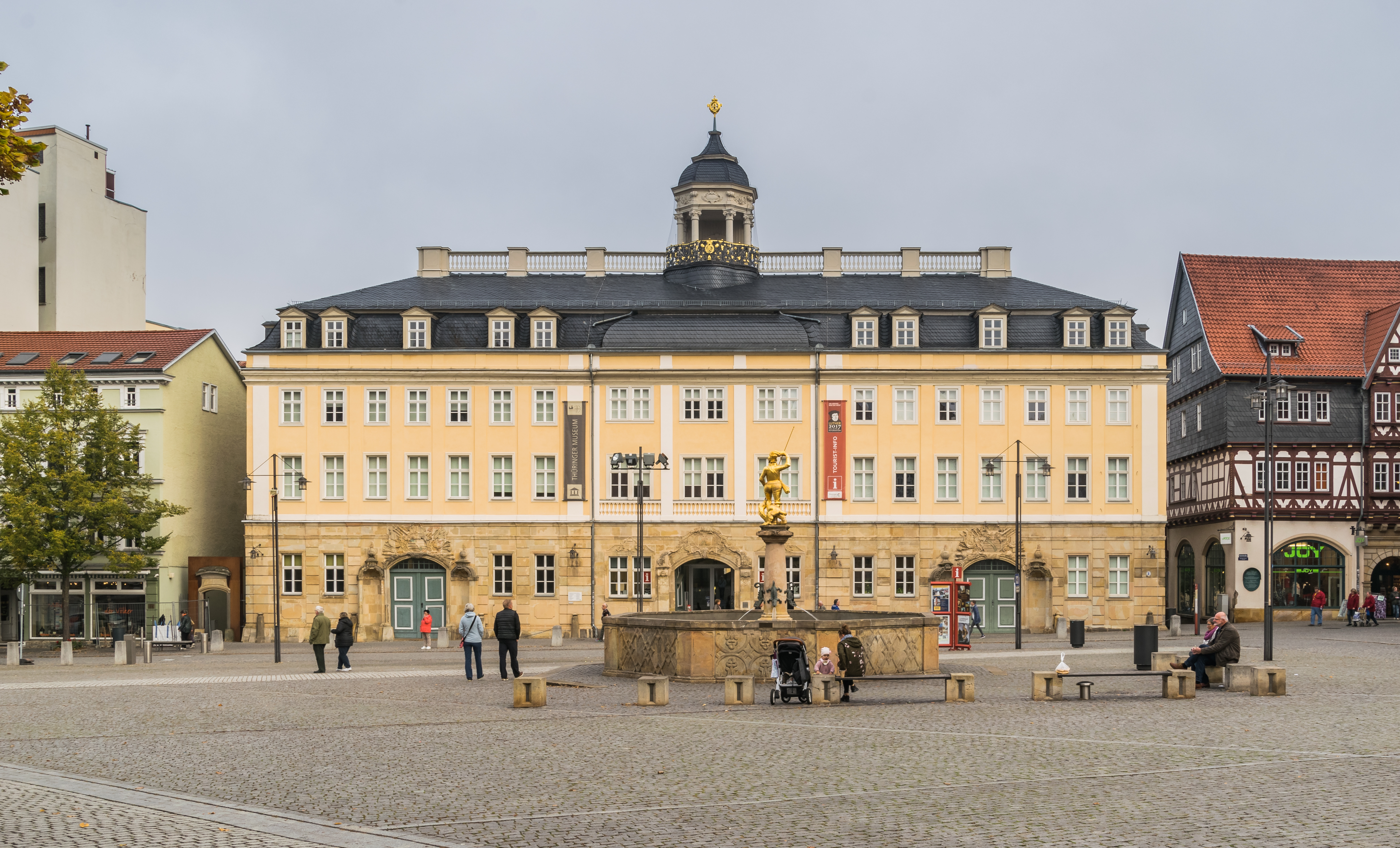
Stadtschloss

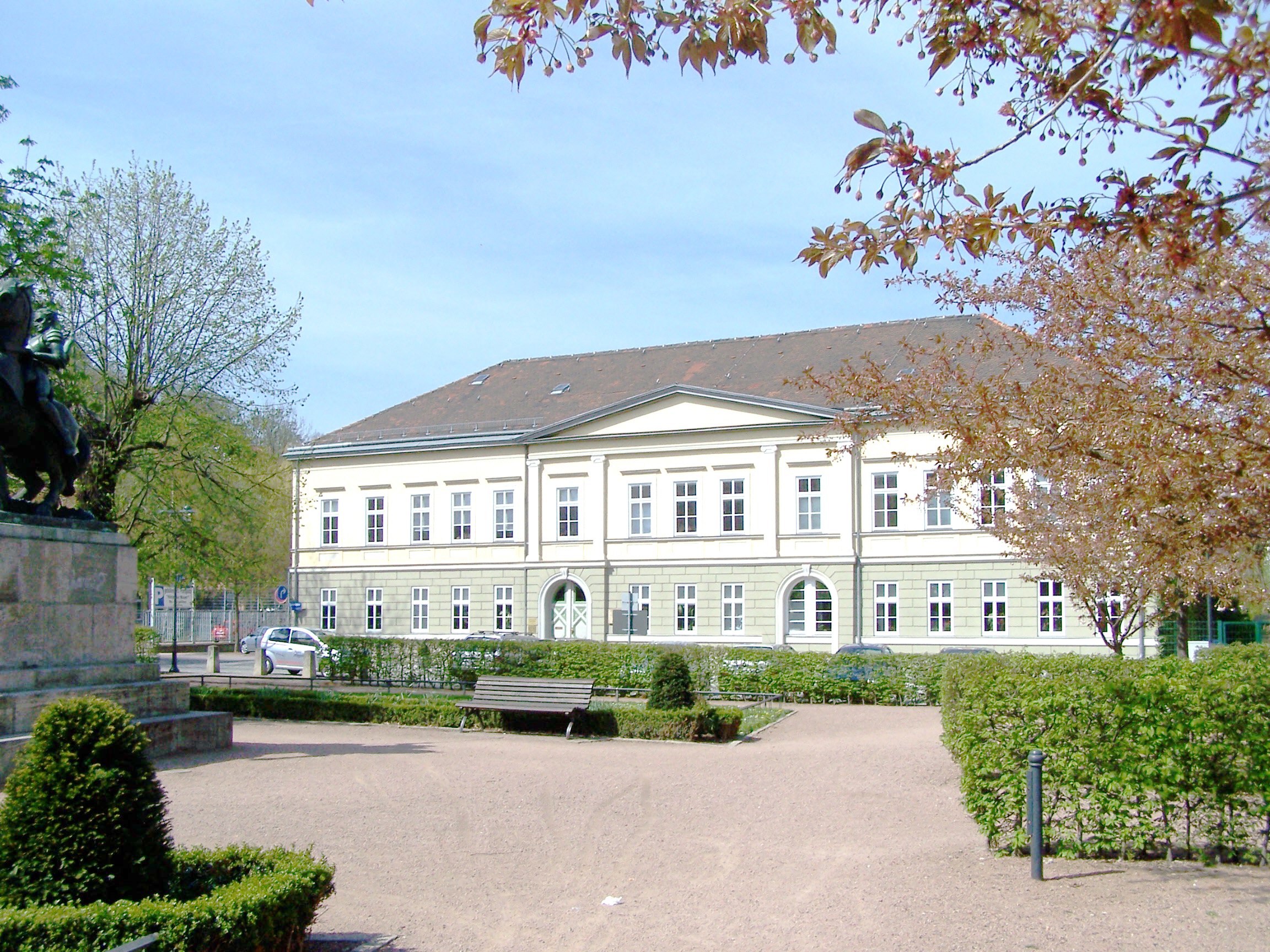
Bechtolsheim Palace

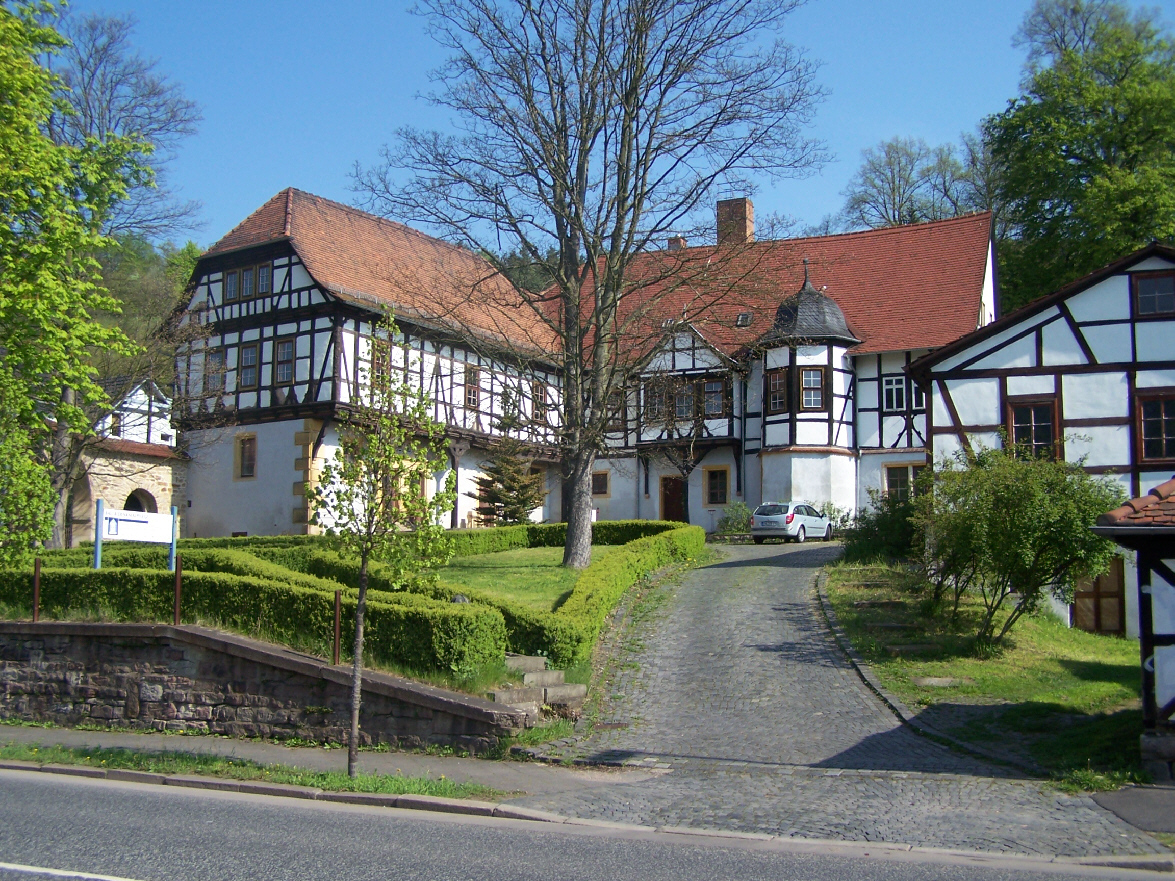
Schloss Fischbach

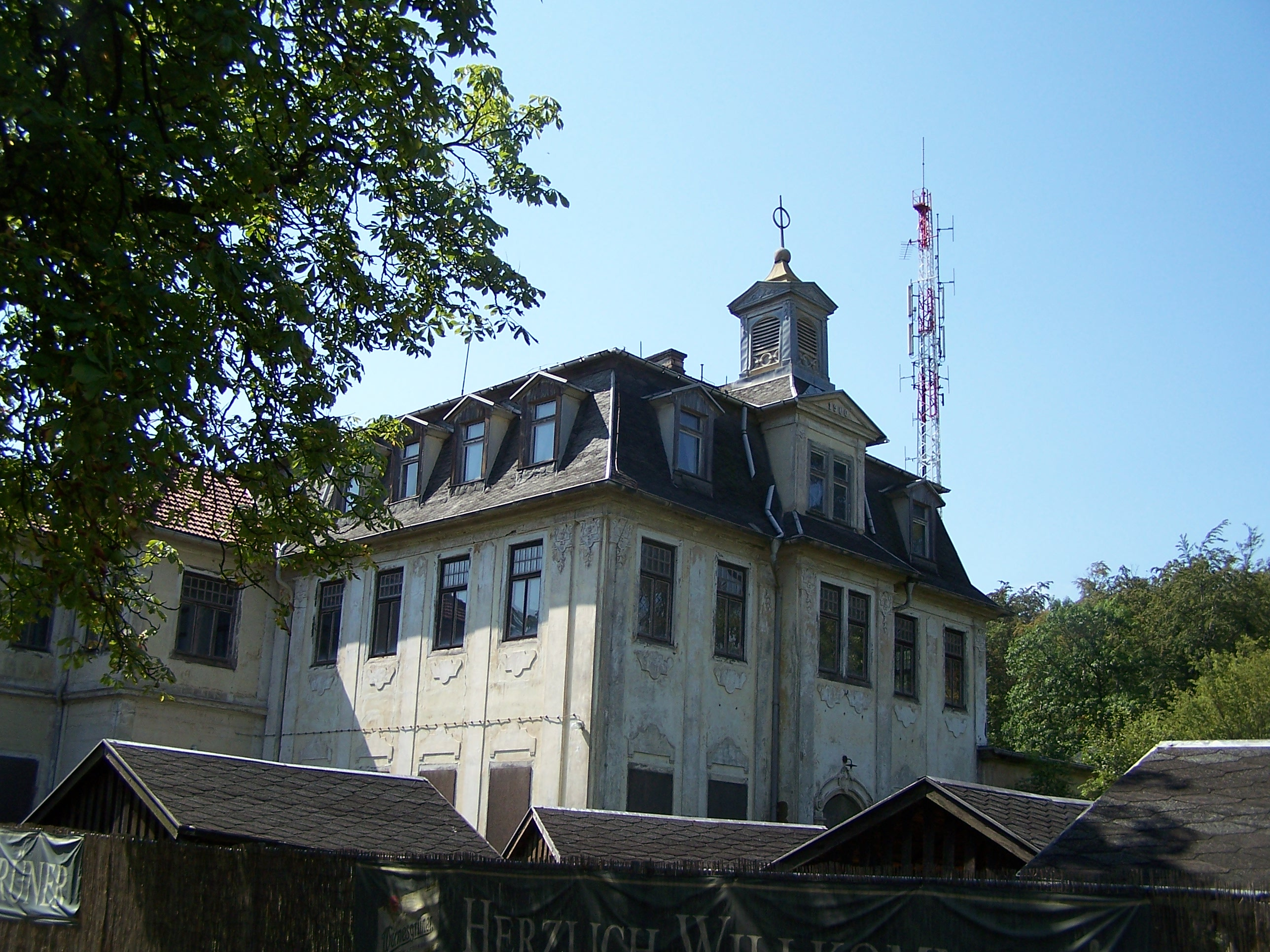
Jagdschloss Hohe Sonne

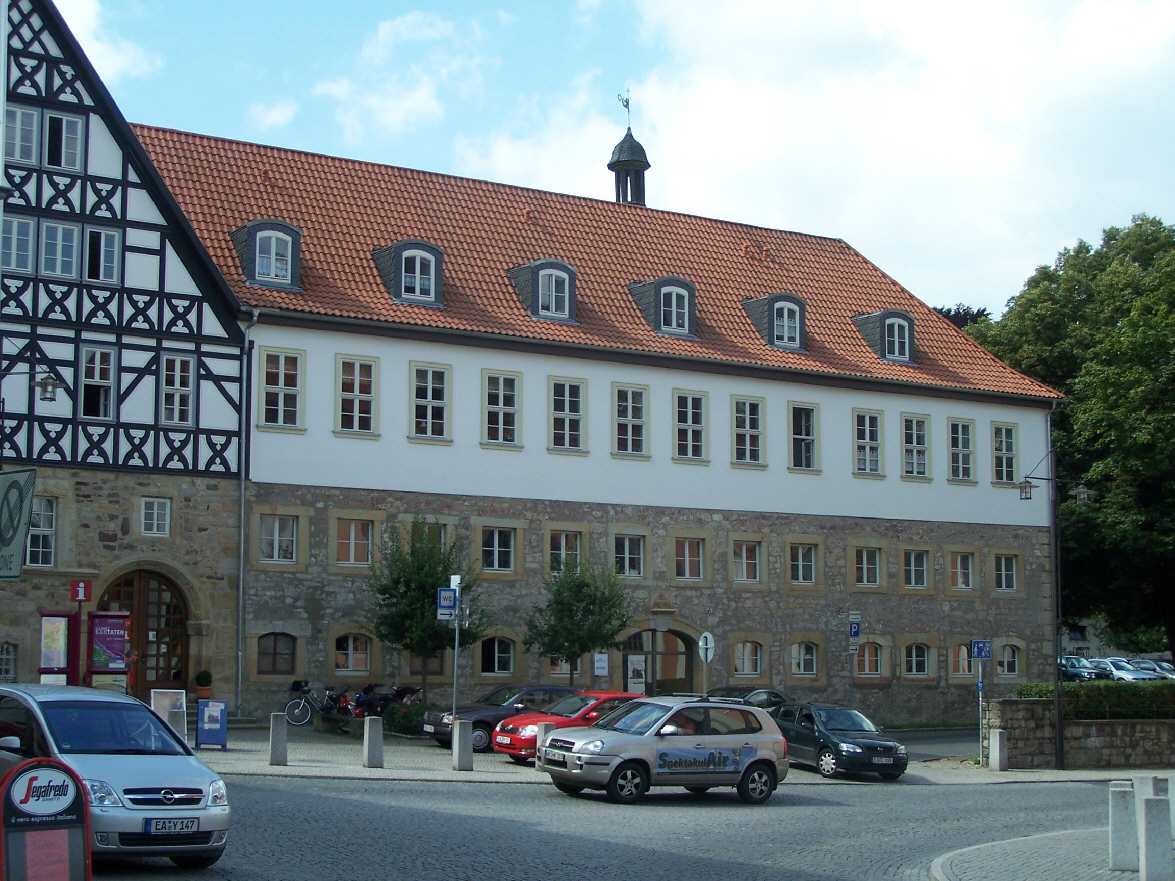
Alte Residenz

==== Memorials ====
- The Bach monument was constructed in 1884 by Adolf von Donndorf. Financed by other well-known musicians, the more-than-life-size figure portrays Johann Sebastian Bach in his St. Thomas's choir-master's clothes and wig. It is situated on the Frauenplan next to the Bachhaus.
- The Martin Luther monument at Karlsplatz was designed by Adolf von Donndorf and was dedicated on 4 May 1895 on the 374th anniversary of Luther's arrival at Wartburg castle. The more-than-life-size statue of Martin Luther on a pedestal also has reliefs depicting events of his life leading up to and including his stay in Eisenach as well as the title of one of his most famous hymns, "Ein feste Burg ist unser Gott" ("A Mighty Fortress Is Our God").
- The Burschenschaftsdenkmal (literally: "Monument to Student Fraternities") on Göpelskuppe hill was built in 1902. The monument stands on a hill opposite the Wartburg in memory of the members of the liberal and nationalistic student movement and others who were killed in the struggle for a united Germany between 1864 and 1871. The monument that reaches a height of 33 meters and proclaims "Honour, Freedom, and Fatherland", was dedicated on 22 May 1902 and was extended in 1933 to honour those who fell in World War I. Since reunification, fraternities again have been meeting in Eisenach in memory of the demonstrations held at the Wartburg in the past.
- The "Dejudaization Institute" Memorial was unveiled on May 6, 2019 at the beginning of Bornstrasse. A plaque with text, which is integrated in the memorial, acknowledges the churches’ guilt, summarizes the "Dejudaization Institute’s" work and impact, and remembers the victims of the church's anti-Judaism and anti-Semitism.
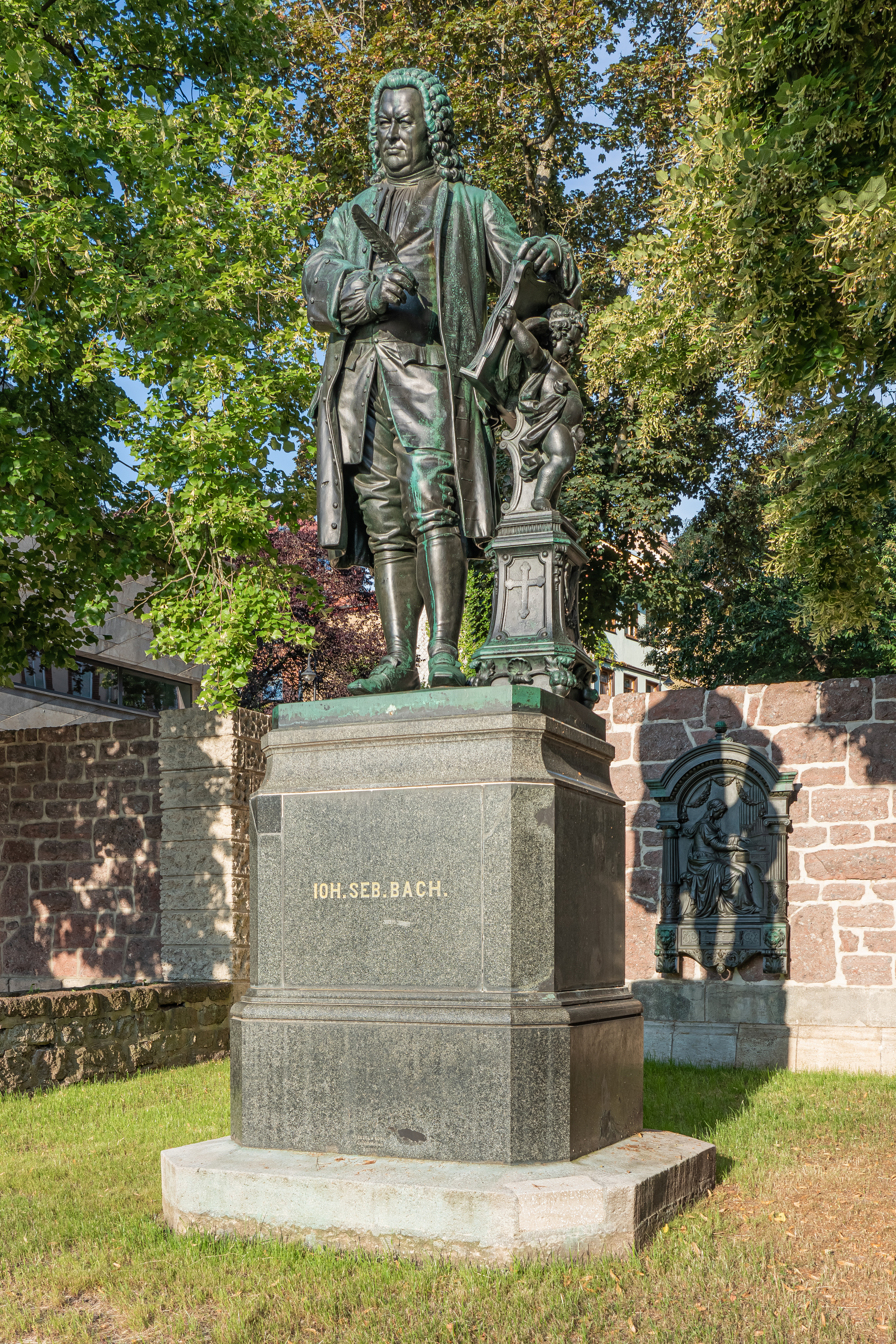
Bach monument

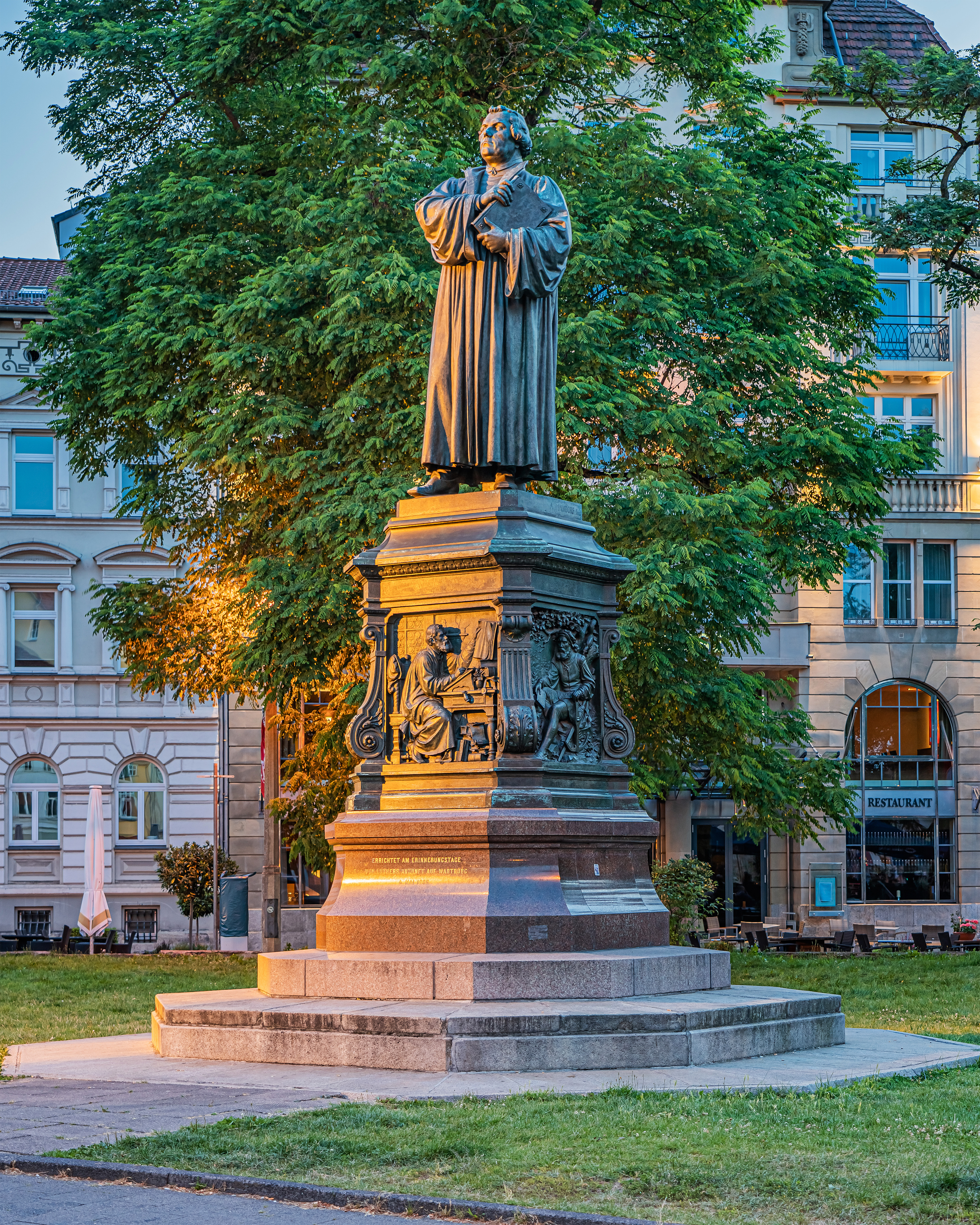
Luther monument

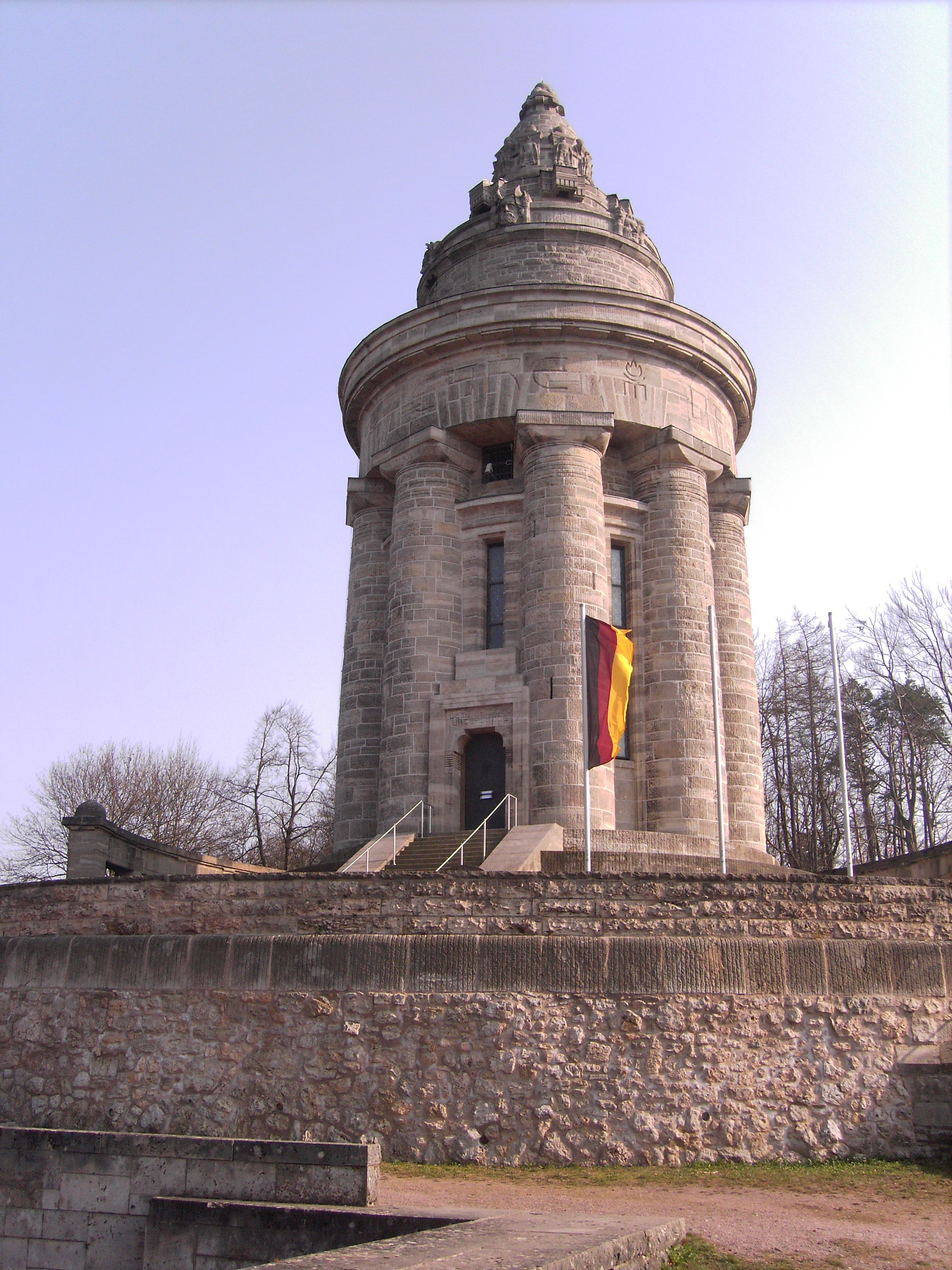
Burschenschaftsdenkmal

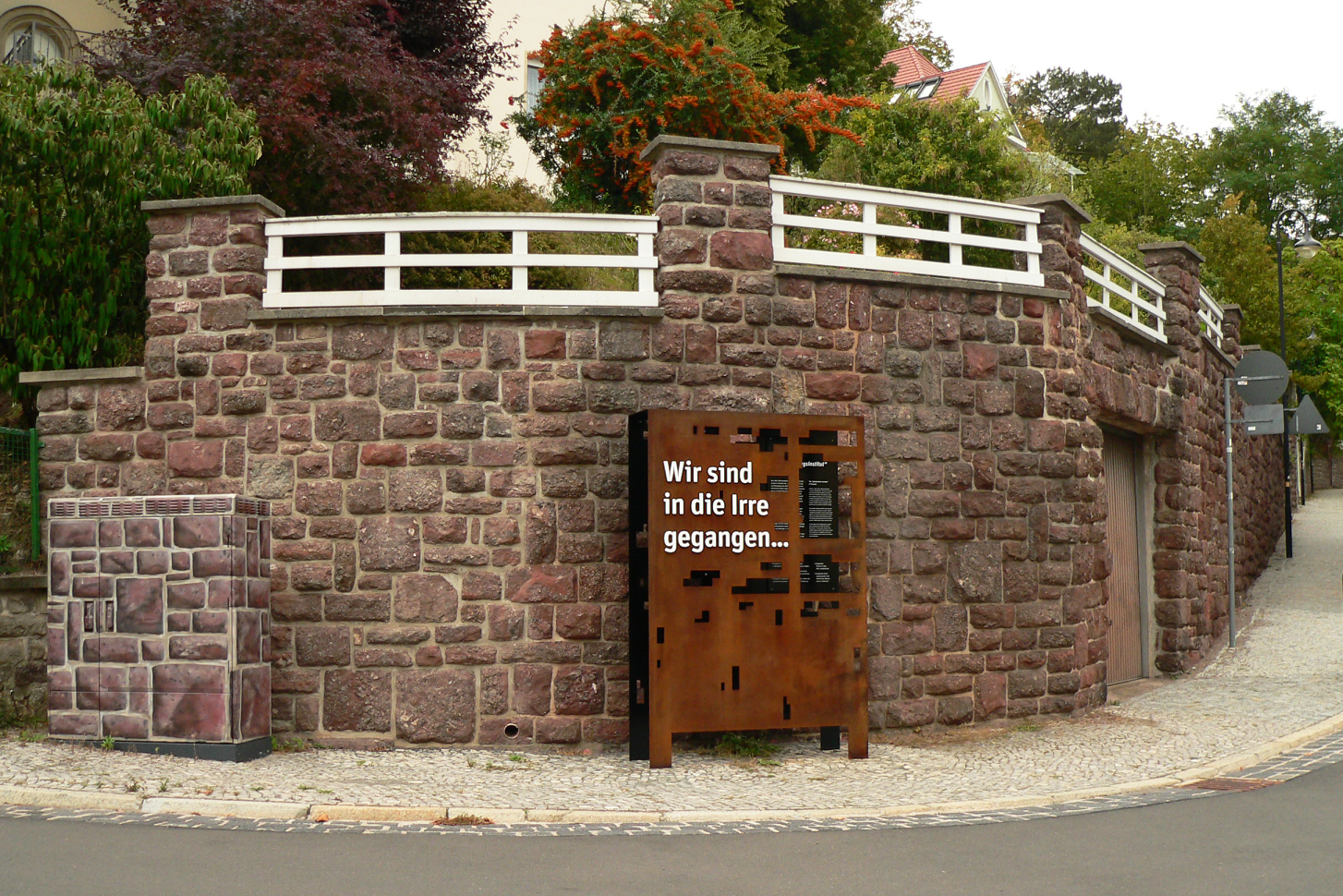
"Dejudaization Institute" Memorial

==== Other sights ====
- The town walls were built during the 13th century and demolished in the 19th century. Remains visible today are the Nikolaitor and the Glockenturm.
- The Kartausgarten is all that remains of the original Carthusian monastery, consecrated to St. Elizabeth in 1380. In 1700 it became a royal kitchen garden and around 1800 was changed into a park. The "Wandelhalle" (covered walk and foyer), built in 1906, was originally intended as a pump room to a spa planned for Eisenach that never materialised.
- The town hall at Marktplatz was a former wine cellar and became the townhall of Eisenach in 1596. The building, having been destroyed by fire in 1636, was rebuilt in 1641. The southern part of the complex suffered considerable damage in a bombing raid in 1945 during World War II. It was renovated in 1996 and it now houses the municipal administration offices.
- The Landestheater (state theatre) was established in 1879 by Julius von Eichel-Streiber and constructed to the design of the Leipzig architect Karl Weichardt. It was later renovated in 1993. The theatre holds an audience of 600 and has two balconies.
- The narrow house may be the narrowest half-timbered house in Germany. It was built before 1750 and is only 2.05 meters wide. Inside visitors can view a small exhibition. Notably, Bach composed several sonnets here as he liked the acoustics of the house.
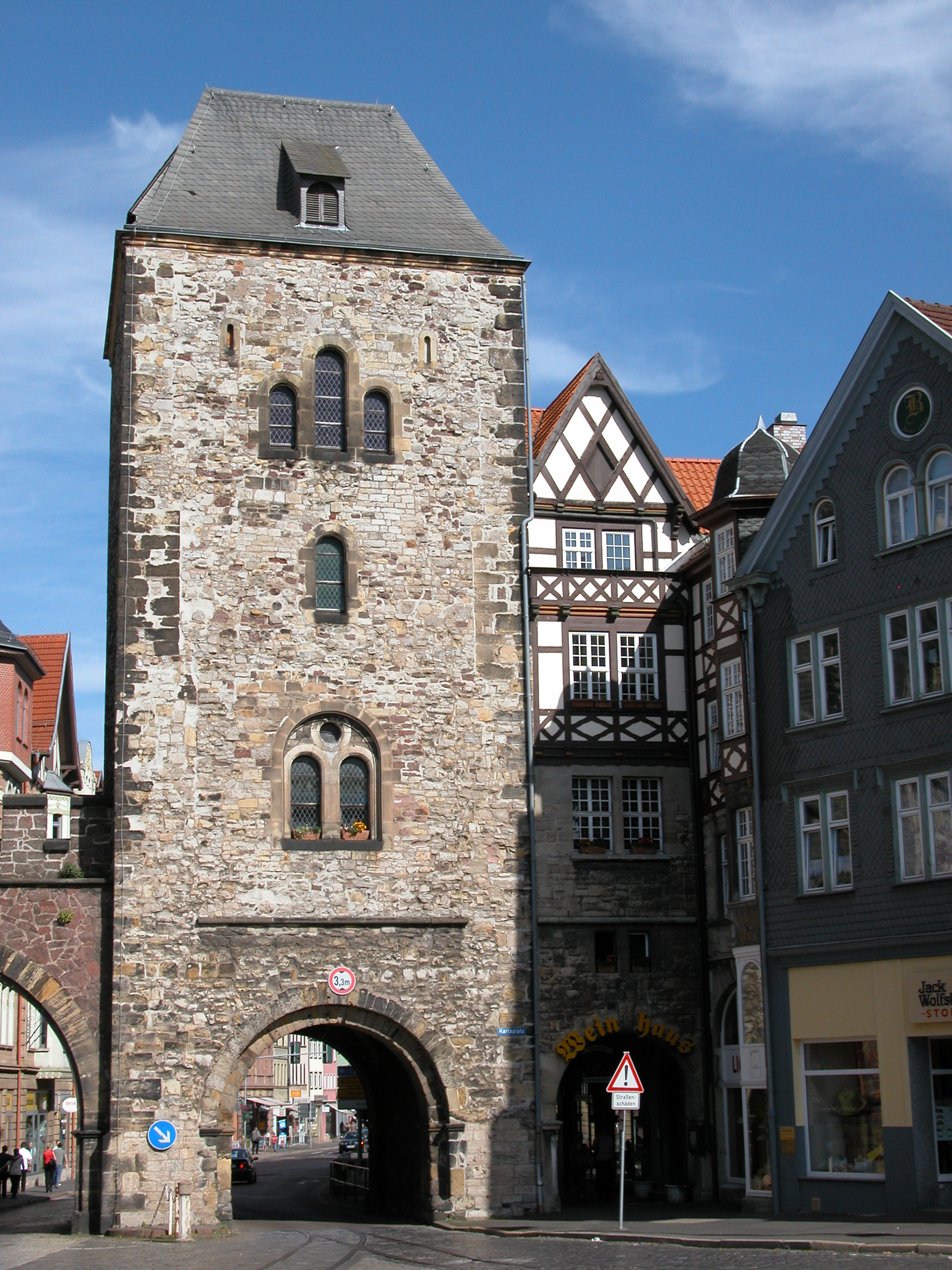
Town gate Nikolaitor

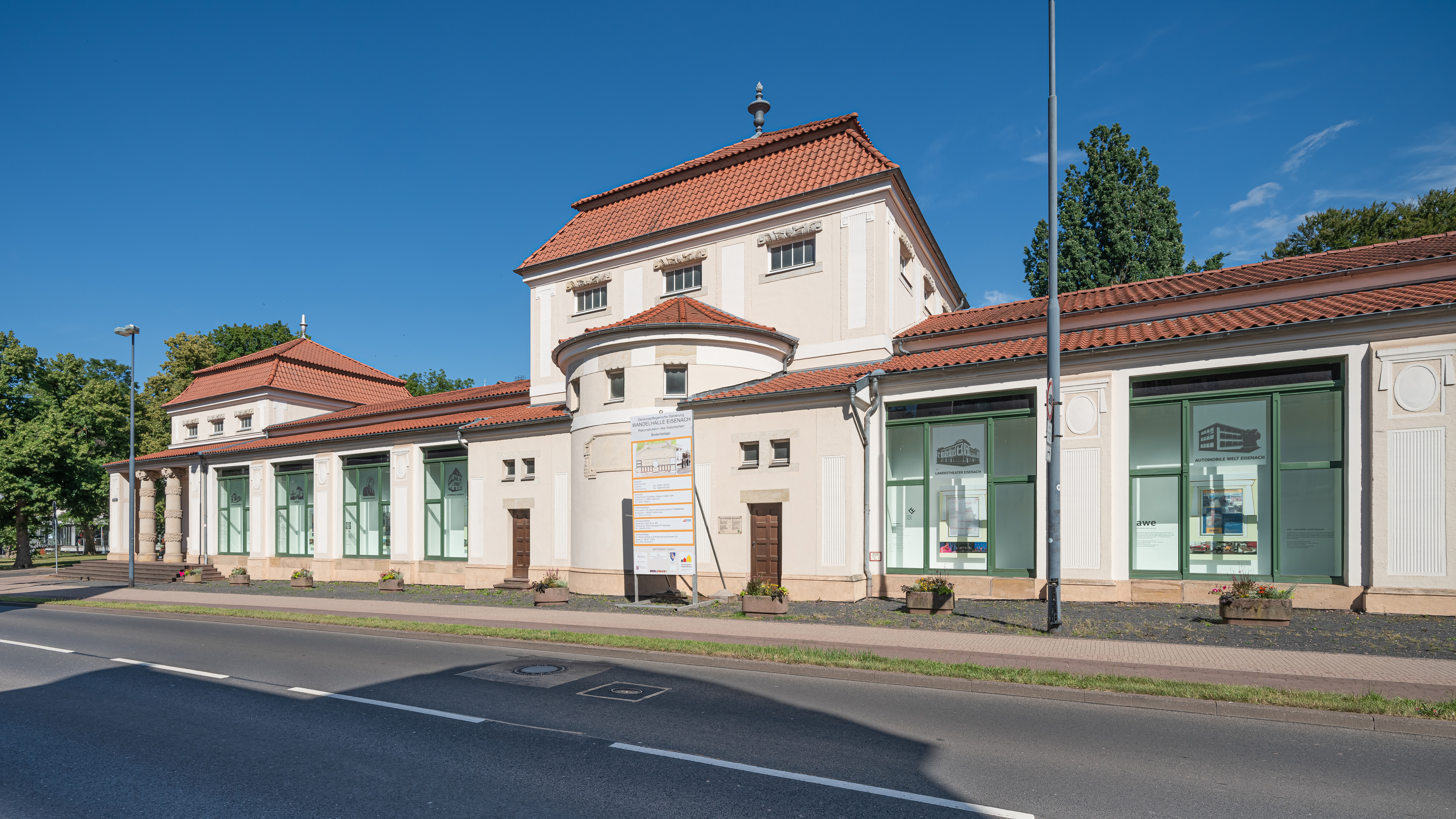
The Wandelhalle at Kartausgarten

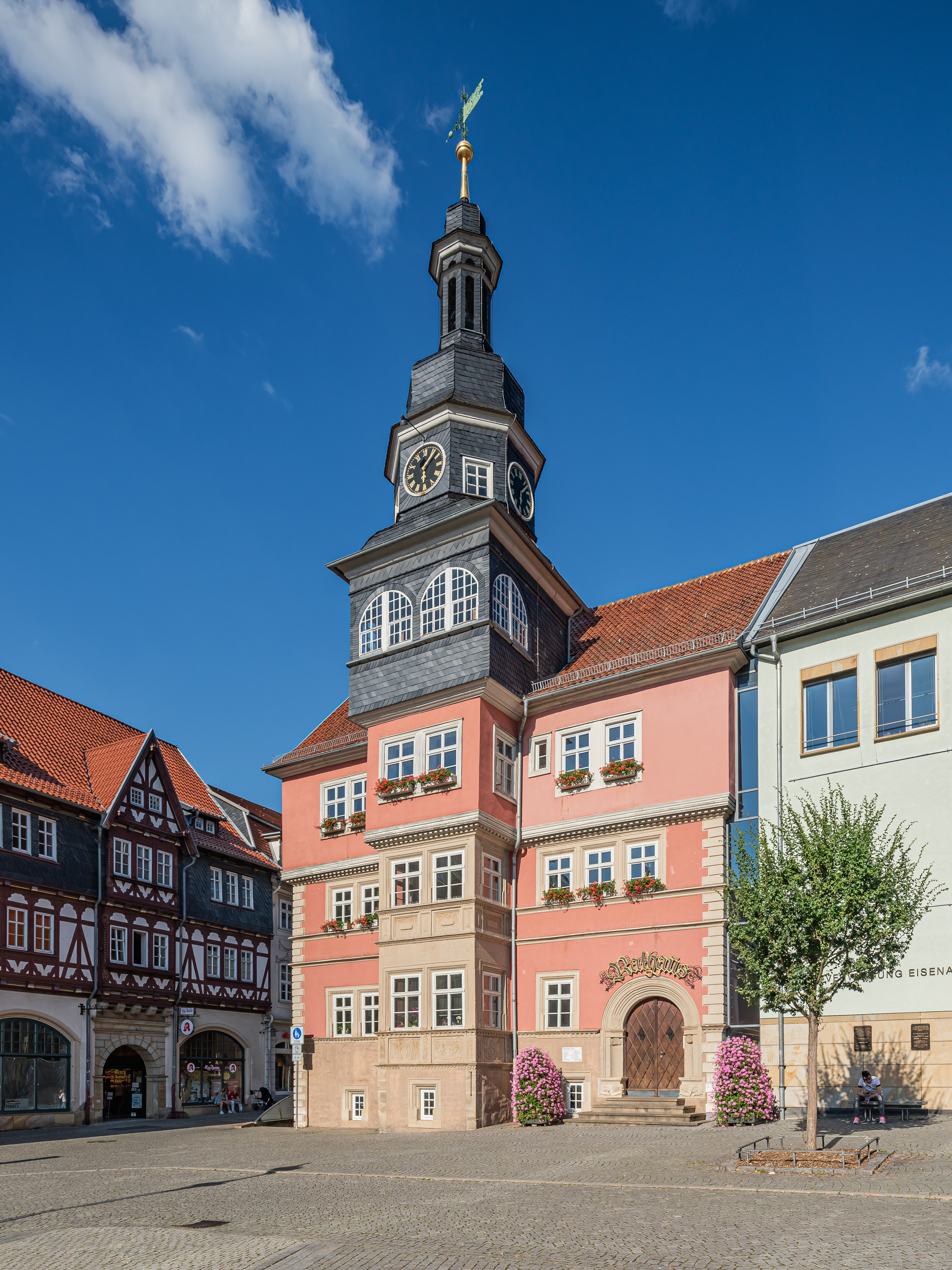
Town hall

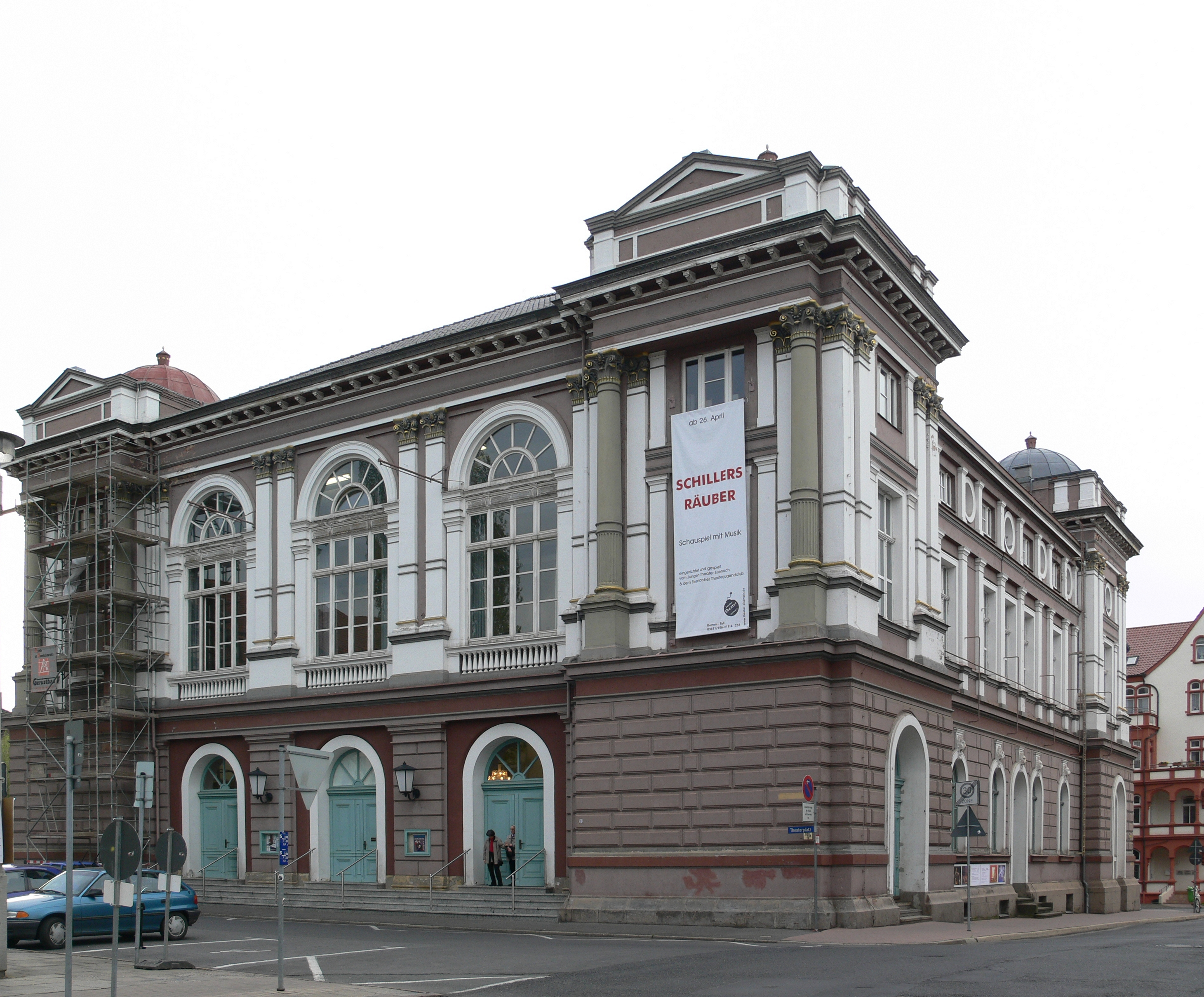
Theatre

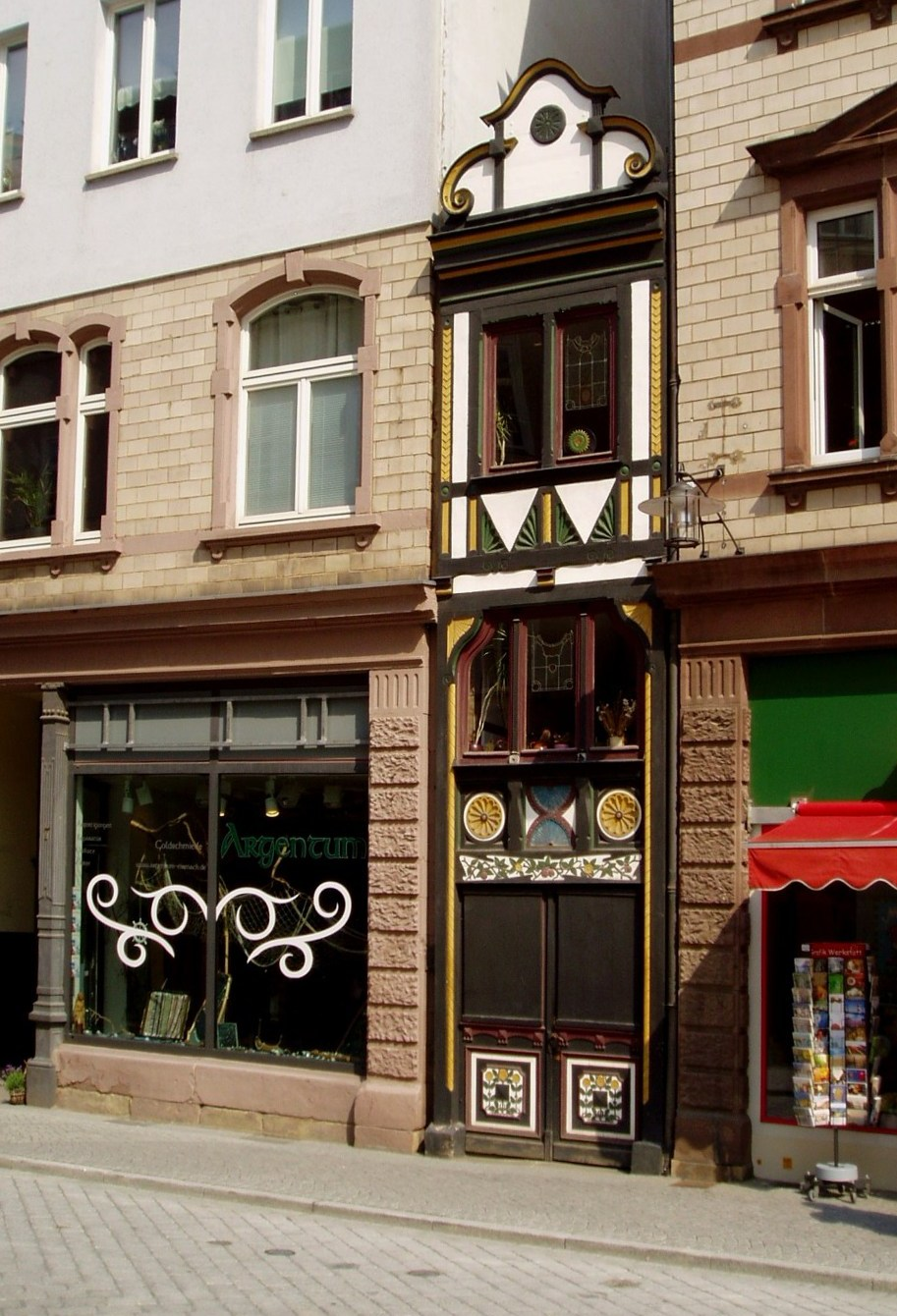
Narrow House

== Politics ==
=== Mayor and city council ===
The first freely elected mayor after German reunification was Hans-Peter Brodhun of the Christian Democratic Union (CDU), who served from 1990 to 2000. He was succeeded by fellow CDU member Gerhard Schneider from 2000 and 2006. Matthias Doht of the Social Democratic Party (SPD) was elected mayor in 2006. In 2012, Katja Wolf of The Left won the mayoralty, becoming the first female mayor in Eisenach's history. After defecting to the Sahra Wagenknecht Alliance in 2023, she retired as mayor to run for the 2024 Thuringian state election. The most recent mayoral election was held on 26 May 2024, with a runoff held on 9 June, and the results were as follows:

Candidate	Party	First round		Second round	
Candidate	Party	Votes	%	Votes	%
Jonny Kraft	Social Democratic Party	5,727	30.5	7,039	42.7
Christoph Ihling	Christian Democratic Union	7,608	40.5	9,437	57.3
Stephan Müller	Alternative for Germany	5,460	29.1		
Valid votes		18,795	98.0	16,476	91.7
Invalid votes		379	2.0	1,482	8.3
Total		19,174	100.0	17,958	100.0
Electorate/voter turnout		33,161	57.8	33,138	54.2
Source: Wahlen in Thüringen

The most recent city council election was held on 26 May 2024, and the results were as follows:

Party	Lead candidate	Votes	%	±	Seats	±
Christian Democratic Union (CDU)	Christoph Ihling	14,955	27.1	▲6.4	10	▲3
Alternative for Germany (AfD)	Tim Schnitger	10,839	19.6	▲7.8	7	▲3
Social Democratic Party (SPD)	Jonny Kraft	7,259	13.1	▲1.3	5	▲1
The Left (Die Linke)	Christiane Leischner	5,022	9.1	▼12.6	3	▼5
The Homeland (HEIMAT)	Patrick Wieschke	4,399	8.0	▼2.2	3	▼1
Citizens for Eisenach (BfE)	Heike Apel-Spengler	4,249	7.7	▲0.7	3	▲1
Alliance 90/The Greens (Grüne)	Nele Marie Bär	4,084	7.4	▼2.9	3	▲1
Voter Group Firefighter (WGF)	Dieter Suck	2,143	3.9	New	1	New
Free Democratic Party (FDP)	Gisela Rexrodt	1,275	2.3	▼2.2	1	▼1
Eisenacher Awakening (EA)	Katrin Huber	1,008	1.8	▼0.4	0	▼1
Valid votes		55,233	100.0			
Invalid ballots		479	2.5			
Total ballots		19,059	100.0		36	±0
Electorate/voter turnout		33,162	57.5	▼0.4		
Source: Wahlen in Thüringen

== Twin towns – sister cities ==
Eisenach is twinned with:

- Marburg, Germany (1988)
- Sedan, France (1991)
- Waverly, Iowa, United States (1992)
- Skanderborg, Denmark (1993)
- Mogilev, Belarus (1996)
- Sárospatak, Hungary (2008)

== Infrastructure ==
=== Transport ===
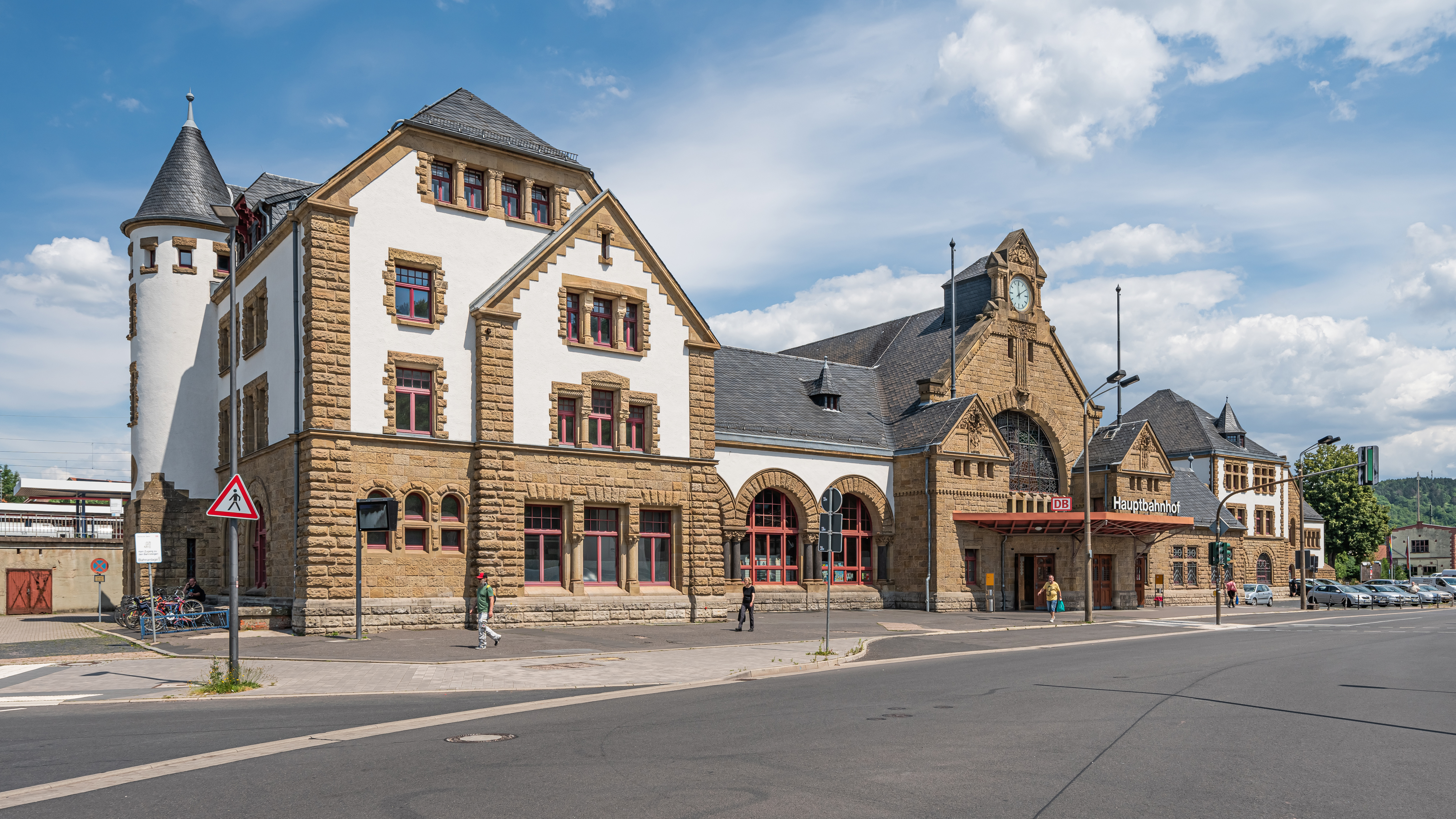
Eisenach Hauptbahnhof (Hbf)

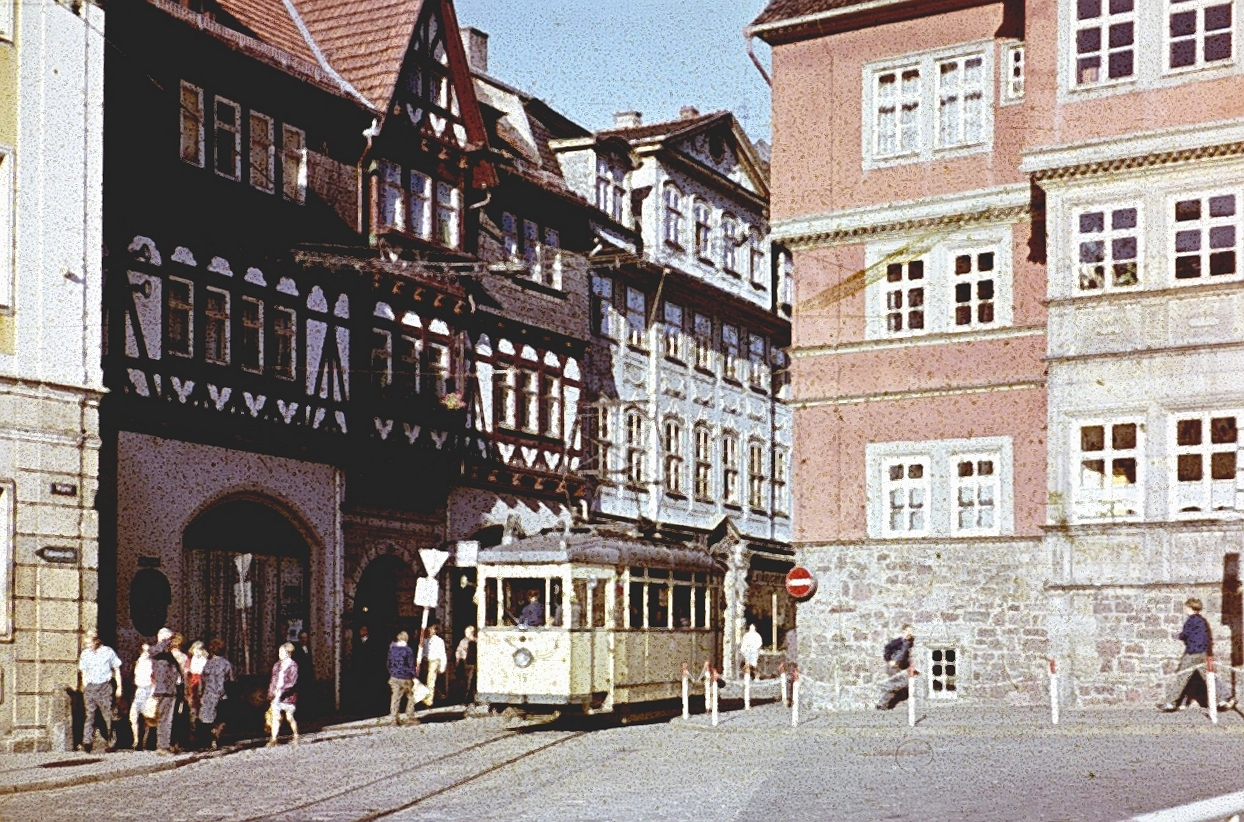
A tram at Marktplatz in 1974

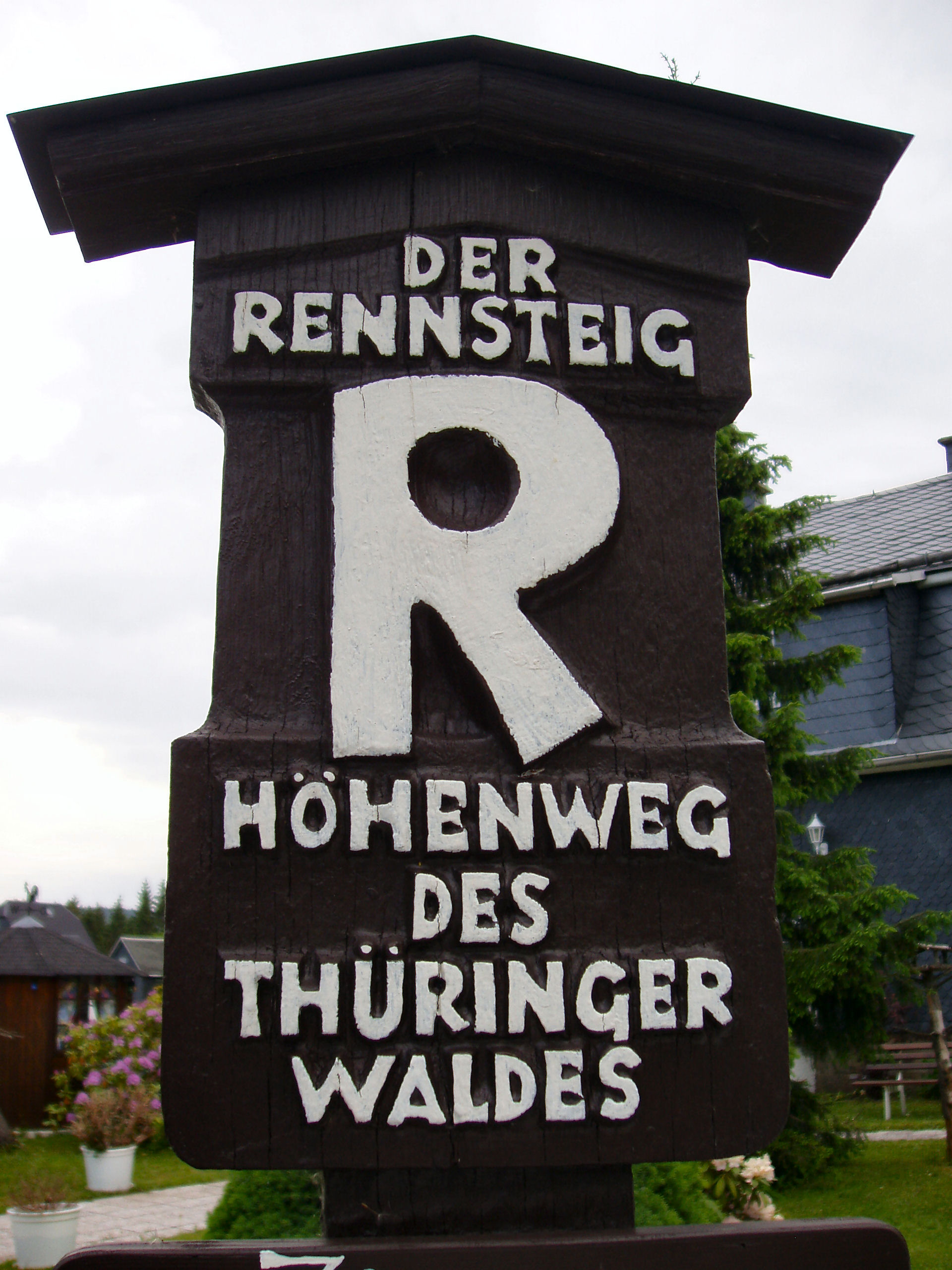
The "R" is the symbol of the Rennsteig hiking trail in the Thuringian Forest, which starts in Eisenach.

Eisenach is connected by the Thuringian Railway to Erfurt and Halle/Leipzig to the east and to Kassel and Frankfurt to the west. Furthermore, there is the Werra Railway, a former main-line railway between north and south Germany from Eisenach via Meiningen to Eisfeld, which since the division of Germany after World War II has served only for regional transport. At the former inner German border, it is still interrupted between Eisfeld and Coburg, but rebuilding is in discussion. Eisenach Hauptbahnhof is a stop of all long-distance trains from Frankfurt to Leipzig/Dresden, running once an hour. Local trains, also once an hour, start in Eisenach to Halle via Erfurt, to Sonneberg via Meiningen and Eisfeld and to Bebra via Gerstungen. Freight transport is important at Eisenach's Opel factory which has its own terminal. Further local passenger stations are Eisenach-West, Eisenach-Opelwerk and Hörschel.

Eisenach is located on the Bundesautobahn 4 from Frankfurt in the west to Erfurt and Dresden in the east. Since 2010, the Autobahn has been moved to a new route farther away from the town to protect the residents from noise and air pollution. Moreover, it was not possible to expand the old route because of the mountainous topography. After 2010, parts of the old route became a town highway, whereas other parts were renaturalized. A second Autobahn between Eisenach and Kassel is in construction (Bundesautobahn 44). There are four Bundesstraßen connecting Eisenach: The Bundesstraße 7 runs to Kassel in the north-west, whereas its eastern branch to Gotha was annulled in 2010. The Bundesstraße 19 leads to Meiningen in the south, the Bundesstraße 84 to Bad Langensalza in the north-east and to Fulda via Vacha in the south-west and the Bundesstraße 88 is a connection to Ilmenau in the south-east. Furthermore, there are two important secondary roads to Mühlhausen via Mihla in the north and to Herleshausen in the west through the Hörsel valley. Downtown traffic is concentrated on Rennbahn street, which often leads to congestion due to a large number of commuters and the town's narrow topography.

The next local airports are the Erfurt-Weimar Airport, about 50 km (31 mi) to the east and the Kassel Calden Airport, roughly 90 km (56 mi) to the north-west. Both offer service to tourist destinations. The next major international airport is Frankfurt Airport, circa 200 km (124 mi) to the south-west. Kindel Airfield, 12 km (7 mi) east of Eisenach, is a former Soviet military base, today used for private aviation.

Biking is getting more and more popular since the construction of quality cycle tracks began in the 1990s. Long distance trails include the Werra trail, the Rennsteig trail and the Radweg Thüringer Städtekette ("Thuringian town string trail"). These all connect points of touristic interest, the first along the Werra valley from the Thuringian Forest to the Weser river in Hann. Münden, the second through the Thuringian Forest along its crest to the Saale river near Hof and the third follows near the medieval Via Regia from the Werra valley/Eisenach via Gotha, Erfurt and Weimar to Altenburg.

Public transport in Eisenach is by a bus network servicing the downtown areas as well as the neighbouring towns and villages. The three-line tramway system of Eisenach was in operation between 1897 and 1975.

== Education ==
After reunification, the educational system was reformed. Eisenach currently has six state-run and one Protestant primary schools.

There are two types of secondary school in Germany. The gymnasium prepares students for higher education at a university and students graduate after a total of 12 or 13 years of education with an Abitur. There are two public and one evangelical gymnasium in Eisenach named after personalities of the cities history:

- Elisabeth Gymnasium (named after St. Elisabeth. This public gymnasium is partner school for the handball project of the local ThSV Eisenach handball club which is one of clubs playing in Germany's first league (Handball Bundesliga). Students can specialise in science, languages or music & art and are offered an intense course in economics & law in year 11 and 12).
- Ernst Abbe Gymnasium (named after Ernst Abbe. This public gymnasium offers specialisations in science and languages and offers its student a MINT – math, IT, science, technology – certificate, similar to a degree in STEM fields.
- Luther Gymnasium (named after Martin Luther. In addition to its religious focus, this Protestant gymnasium offers specialisations in science and languages. Career guidance and a diaconal internship are part of year 11 and 12).

Another form of secondary school is the Realschule where students graduate after a total of ten years of education. There are four public and one free sponsored Realschulen in Eisenach.

In addition, there is one Waldorf school where education spans from primary school to gymnasium.

In 1998, the Berufsakademie Eisenach was founded. The roughly 600 students can obtain a bachelor's degree there, either in economics or in technics.

== Sport ==
ThSV Eisenach is a professional handball club that plays in the Bundesliga.

== Notable people ==
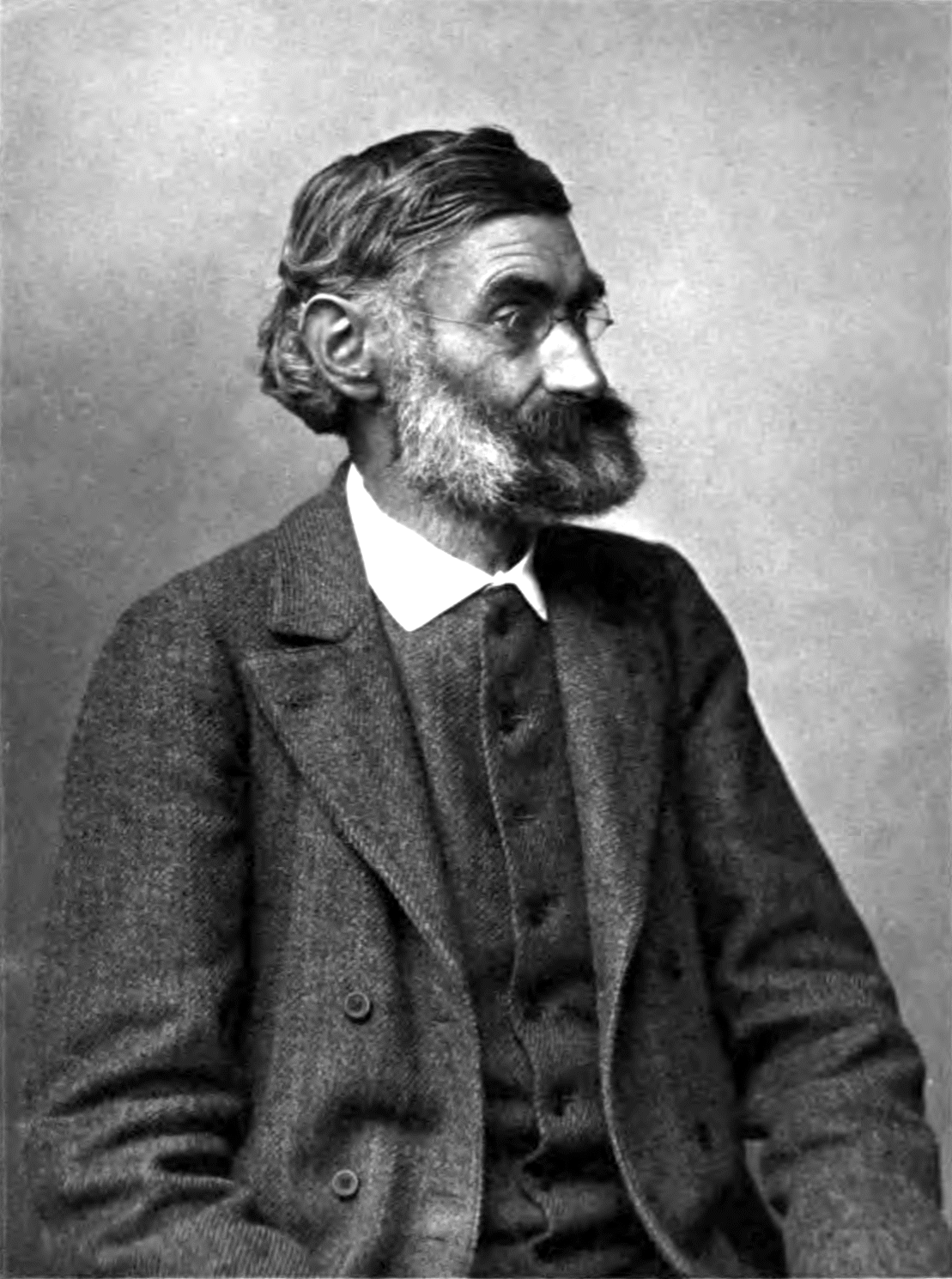
Ernst Abbe (Heliogravure Emil Tesch)

- Ernst Abbe (1840–1905), physicist and entrepreneur
- Johann Sebastian Bach (1685–1750), composer of the baroque, organist and harpsichordist
- Eleonore Heerwart (1835–1911), educator
- St. Elisabeth (1207–1231), princess of the Kingdom of Hungary and Catholic saint
- Ingedore Grünfeld Villaça Koch (1933–2018), German-Brazilian linguist
- Harry Lange (film designer) (1930–2008)
- Heinrich Liebe (1908–1997), navy officer
- Martin Luther (1483–1546), professor of theology, reformer
- Christian Franz Paullini (1643–1712), physician and polymath
- Karl-Wilhelm von Schlieben (1894–1964), German general
- Hermann Wislicenus (1825–1899), painter

=== Sons and daughters of the town ===
- Johann Ernst Bach (1722–1777), composer, court and municipal organist at the Church of St. Georg in Eisenach
- Charlotte von Stein (1742–1827), close friend of Goethe
- Johann Georg Bach (1751–1797), court and municipal organist at the Church of St. Georg in Eisenach
- Karl Friedrich von Steinmetz (1796–1877), Prussian field marshall
- Hermann Hahn (born 1841), architect
- Walter Flex (1887–1917), World War I poet
- Hans Severus Ziegler (1893–1978), writer and director
- Eugen Glückauf (1906–1981), chemist and expert on nuclear power
- Botho Prinz zu Sayn-Wittgenstein-Hohenstein (1927–2008), politician and resistance fighter
- Sabine Bergmann-Pohl (born 1946), doctor and politician (CDU)
- Thomas C. Breuer (born 1952), writer and comedian
- Thomas Reuter (born 1952), composer
- Oliver Schwerdt (born 1979), jazz pianist and musicologist
- Johannes Voigtmann (born 1992), basketball player
