= Anke Wirsing =

German politician

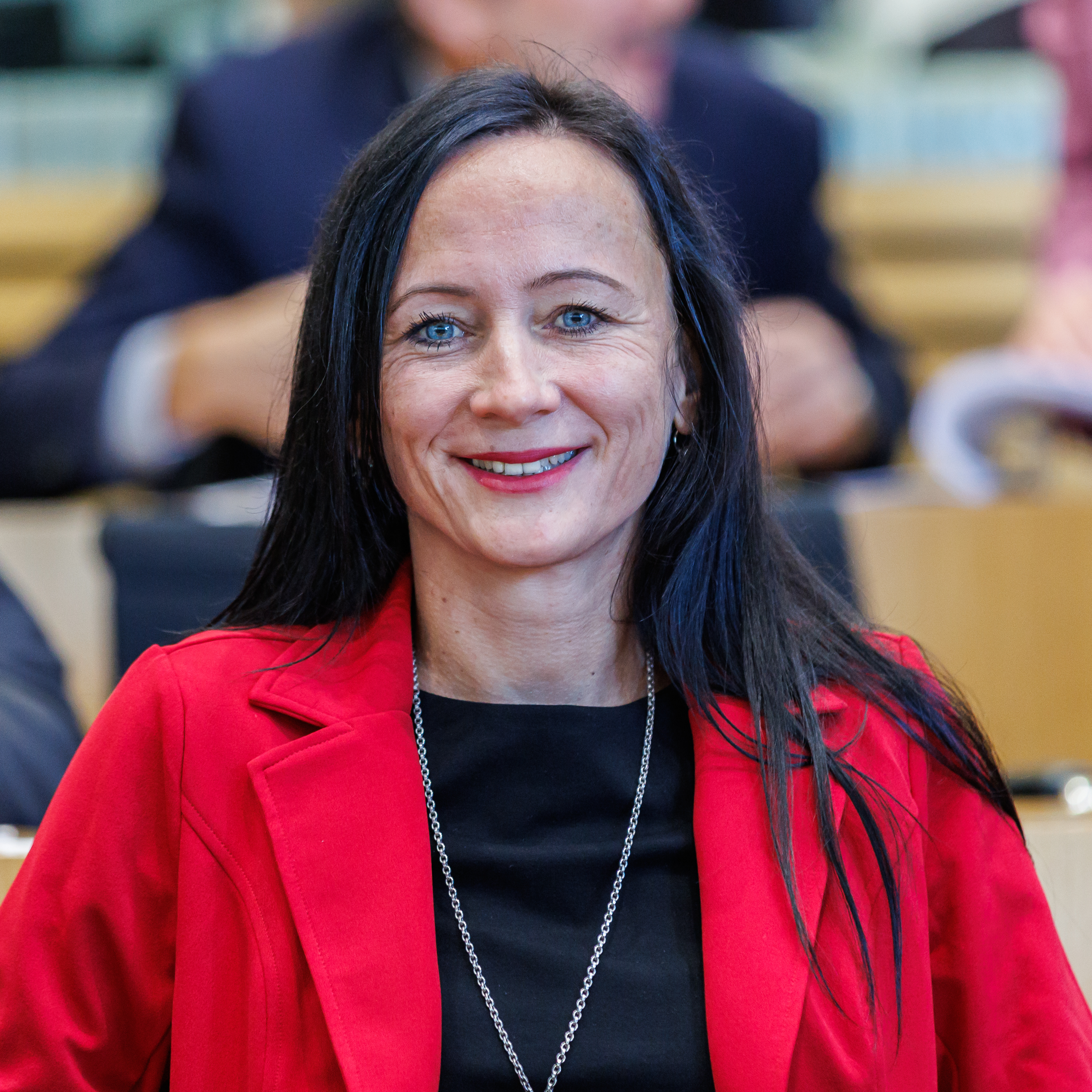
- Wirsing in 2024

Member of the Landtag of Thuringia
- Incumbent
- Assumed office 1 September 2024

Personal details
- Born: 1980 (age 45–46) Bad Salzungen, East Germany
- Party: BSW (since 2024)
- Other political affiliations: Die Linke (until 2024)

Anke Wirsing (born 1980) is a German politician from the Sahra Wagenknecht Alliance (BSW), previously Die Linke. Since 2024, she has been a member of the Landtag of Thuringia.

== Life and career ==
After graduating from secondary school in 1997, she trained as a draftswoman. She then completed a degree in office and project management. Wirsing is married and has two children. She is an educational advisor at SBH Nordost GmbH, Bad Salzungen, a member of the main committee of the Bad Salzungen city council and a member of the administrative board of the spa and tourism company of the city of Bad Salzungen kAöR. Wirsing is a member of the district committee and a member of the youth, social and health committee.

== Politics ==
Until the end of 2023, Wirsing was a member of the Left Party (Die Linke) and had been managing director of the Wartburgkreis-Eisenach district association since 2014. She has been a member of the Bad Salzungen city council since 2014 and chairwoman of the Left faction since 2019. In 2019, she was also elected for The Left in the Wartburgkreis district council. In the 2019 Thuringian state election, she ran for The Left as a direct candidate in the Wartburgkreis III constituency and achieved the third-best result behind Marcus Malsch (CDU) and Klaus Stöber (AfD), so that she did not enter the state parliament.

In 2024, Wirsing became a member of the Sahra Wagenknecht Alliance (BSW). In the 2024 Thuringian local elections, she was again elected to the Wartburg district council and the Bad Salzungen city council. In both bodies, she is chairwoman of the BSW parliamentary group there. In the 2024 Thuringian state election, she took 12th place on the BSW state list and was elected to the 8th Thuringian state parliament. She is a member of the European Committee and spokesperson for youth policy. She is also responsible for work, family and social affairs.

While her regional leader Katja Wolf wanted to make concessions in order to form a coalition, Wirsing declared her allegiance to federal chairwoman and namesake Wagenknecht. On November 1, she wrote on Twitter: "I did not leave DIE LINKE with Sahra Wagenknecht in order to cancel the founding consensus after just a few months. I will not act against the federal executive board."

In the 2025 German federal election, she was the direct candidate in the constituency of Eisenach – Wartburgkreis – Unstrut-Hainich-Kreis. She came in fifth place with 8.1% of first votes.

In August 2026, the BSW national leadership called on their Thuringian branch to leave the state government. However, the majority of the faction resisted the demand and decided to continue supporting the government. Only Wirsing and her fellow party member Sven Küntzel withdrew their support for Minister-President Mario Voigt from the Christian Democratic Union of Germany (CDU).
