= Creuzburg (Verwaltungsgemeinschaft) =

Coordinates: 51.051°N 10.245°E

Creuzburg is a former Verwaltungsgemeinschaft in the district Wartburgkreis in Thuringia, Germany. The seat of the Verwaltungsgemeinschaft was in Creuzburg. It was disbanded on 31 December 2013, when its members joined the Verwaltungsgemeinschaft Mihla.

== Municipalities ==
The Verwaltungsgemeinschaft Creuzburg consisted of the following municipalities:

1. Creuzburg
2. Ifta
3. Krauthausen
