= Creuzburg (disambiguation) =

Creuzburg is a historic town and castle in Thuringia, Germany.

Creuzburg may also refer to:

- Creuzburg (surname), a surname
- Creuzburg (Verwaltungsgemeinschaft), an administrative division in Thuringia, Germany

== See also ==
- Kreutzberg (disambiguation)
- Kreuzberg (disambiguation)
- Kreuzburg (disambiguation)
