= Gumpelstadt =

Village in Thuringia, Germany

Coordinates: 50°50′N 10°17′E

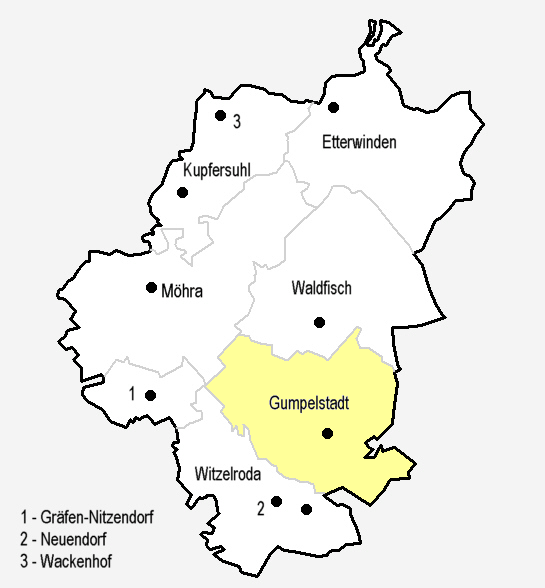
Gumpelstadt in Moorgrund

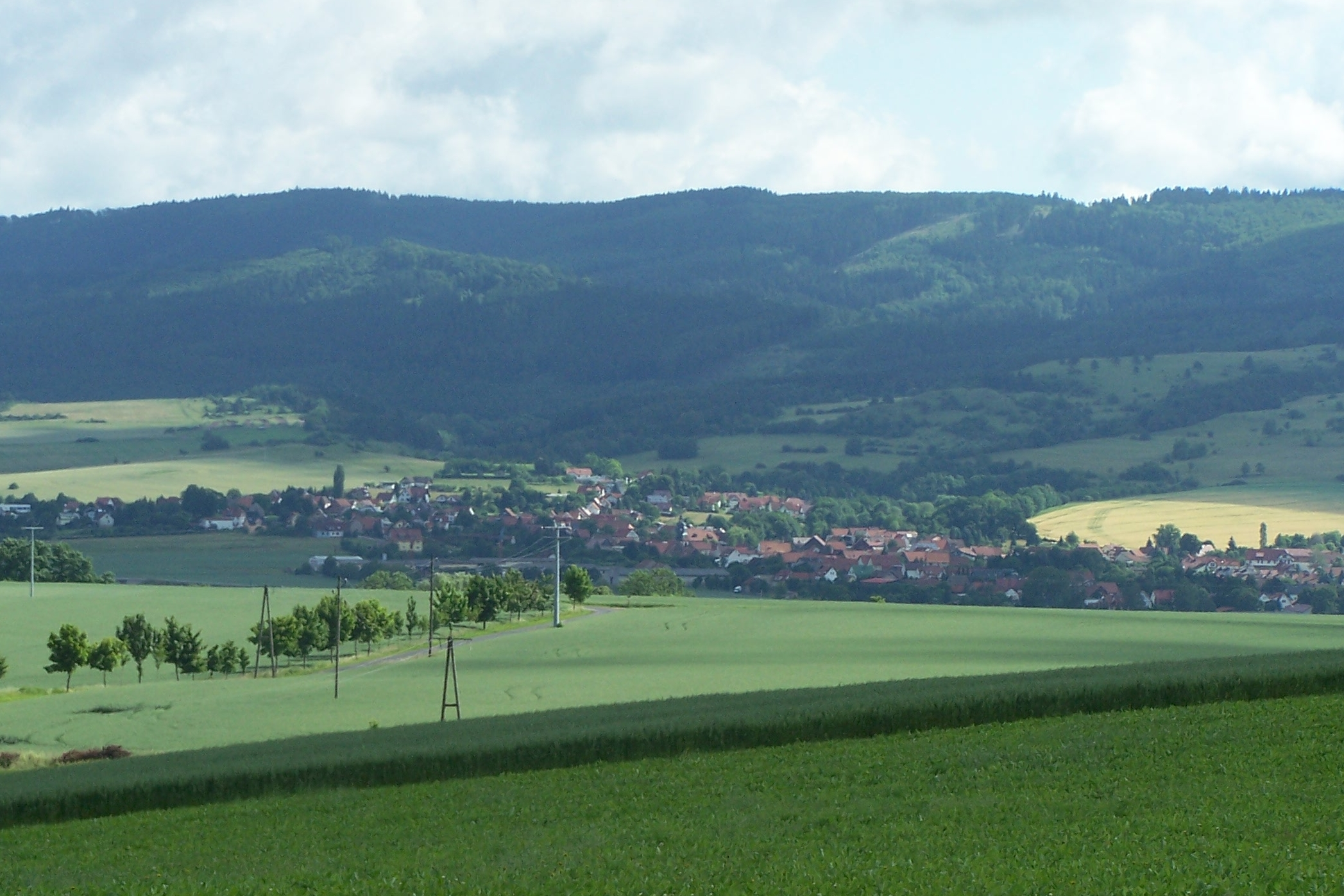
Gumpelstadt from the South

Gumpelstadt is a village of the Moorgrund municipality in the Wartburgkreis district in Thuringia, Germany (since 1994).

== Geography ==
Gumpelstadt is located at an altitude of about 280 meters on the southwest edge of the Thuringian Forest and about five kilometers northeast of Bad Salzungen.

== History ==
Gumpelstadt was first mentioned in 1155. It was first a territory of the Fulda monastery. In 1346 it was take over by the House of Wettin.

Between 1629 and 1664 there were witch trials held in Gumpelstadt in which a woman and a man were burned to death and a woman died under torture.

In 1680, with the fracturing of the Ernestine duchies, Gumpelstadt became part of the Principality of Saxe-Meiningen. It was first part of Amt Altenstein, in 1868 it became part of Meiningen county and in 1950 part of Bad Salzungen county. In 1955, Gumpelstadt had 1223 inhabitants.

Historic industries in the village were agriculture and livestock, and later mining and textile industry.

On 25 March 1994, the municipalities Gumpelstadt, Waldfisch and Witzelroda were dissolved and merged to form the new community Moorgrund.

== Sights ==
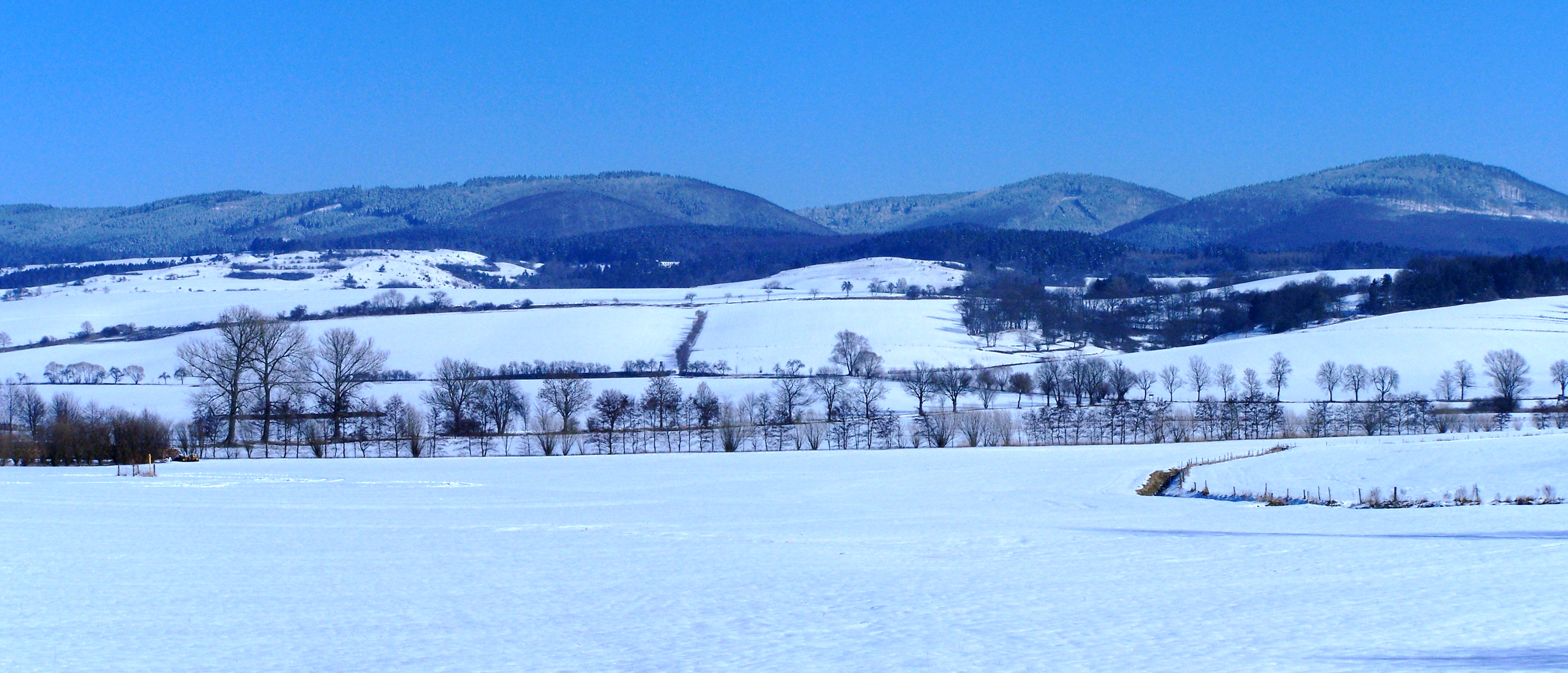
The foothills of the Thuringian Forest near Gumpelstadt

Gumpelstadt is home to 2 nature reserves, Jachzenthal and the mountain Alte Warth, both designated on 6 April 1995.

== Famous people ==
- Margarete Schuck (1861-1950), writer
