= Soislieden =

- Village of Hohenroda
- Interactive map of Soislieden
- Location within Germany Location within Hesse
- Coordinates: 50°47′4″N 9°53′35″E
- Country: Germany
- State: Hesse
- District: Hersfeld-Rotenburg
- Municipality: Hohenroda
- Time zone: UTC+01:00 (CET)
  - Summer (DST): UTC+02:00 (CEST)

Soislieden is a village and Ortsteil of the municipality of Hohenroda in Hersfeld-Rotenburg district in eastern Hesse, Germany. It is part of the Ortsbezirk of Mansbach.
