= Barchfeld (Verwaltungsgemeinschaft) =

Coordinates: 50.801°N 10.304°E

Barchfeld is a former Verwaltungsgemeinschaft in the district Wartburgkreis in Thuringia, Germany. The seat of the Verwaltungsgemeinschaft was in Barchfeld. It was disbanded on 31 December 2012.

The Verwaltungsgemeinschaft Barchfeld consisted of the following municipalities:

1. Barchfeld
2. Immelborn
