= Frankenroda =

- Stadtteil of Amt Creuzburg
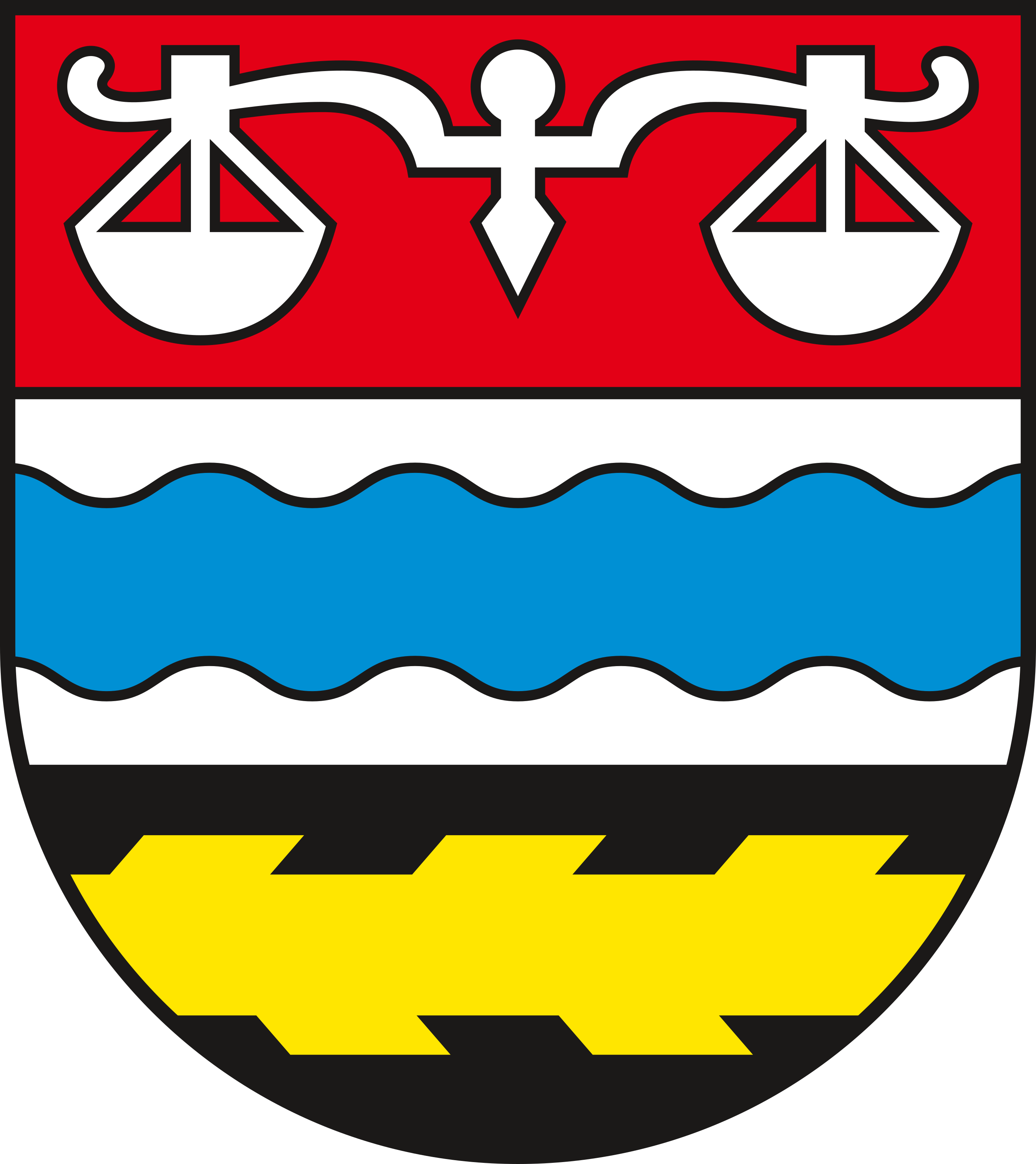
- Coat of arms
- Interactive map of Frankenroda
- Location within Germany Location within Thuringia
- Coordinates: 51°6′N 10°17′E
- Country: Germany
- State: Thuringia
- District: Wartburgkreis
- Town: Amt Creuzburg

Area
  - Total: 7.07 km^{2} (2.73 sq mi)
- Elevation: 185 m (607 ft)

Population (2022-12-31)
  - Total: 317
  - Density: 44.8/km^{2} (116/sq mi)
- Time zone: UTC+01:00 (CET)
  - Summer (DST): UTC+02:00 (CEST)
- Postal codes: 99826
- Dialling codes: 036924
- Website: www.vg-hainich-werratal.de

Frankenroda (German pronunciation: [fʁaŋkn̩ˈʁoːda]) is a village and a former municipality in Wartburgkreis, Thuringia, Germany. On 1 January 2024 it became part of the town Amt Creuzburg.
