= Kreuzberg (disambiguation) =

Kreuzberg is a German word that means "cross mountain" and may refer to:

== Places ==
=== Cities and towns ===
- Kreuzberg, a former borough, now a locality of Berlin, Germany
- Friedrichshain-Kreuzberg, a borough of Berlin, Germany, formed in 2001 by merging the former boroughs of Friedrichshain and Kreuzberg
- Kreuzberg (Ahr), a locality of Altenahr, Germany
- The German name for the town of Krucemburk, Czech Republic
- The German name for the village of Kružberk, Czech Republic

=== Mountains, hills and passes ===
- Kreuzberg (Bavarian Prealps), a mountain in the Bavarian Prealps, Germany
- Kreuzberg (Rhön), a mountain in the Rhön, Germany
- Kreuzberg (Tempelhofer Berge), a hill forming part of the Tempelhofer Berge range, Berlin, Germany, name-giving for the former borough of Berlin
- Kreuzbergpass, a mountain pass between the Carnic Alps and the Dolomites
- Kreuzbergsattel, a mountain pass in the Austrian Alps

== Other uses ==
- "Kreuzberg", a song by Bloc Party from the album A Weekend in the City
- König von Kreuzberg, a German television series
- Liebling Kreuzberg, a German television series
- Kreuzberg, a Polish rock band

== See also ==
- Creuzburg (disambiguation)
- Kreutzberg (disambiguation)
- Kreuzburg (disambiguation)
