= Elisabeth Busse-Wilson =

German historian (1890–1974)

Elisabeth Johanna Auguste Busse-Wilson, née Wilson, (19 February 1890 in Sondershausen – 11 November 1974 in Oberursel, Taunus) was a German historian. She was one of the first generation of German women to receive a university education.

== Biography ==
Elisabeth Wilson was the daughter of a senior judicial officer; her mother had trained as a teacher. She grew up in Frauensee. She attended a girls' secondary school in Erfurt until the age of 15 and a grammar school from 1905. In 1909, she took her Abitur—as was customary at the time—as an external examination, which was so difficult that in later years she still described it as her "greatest achievement".

From 1909, Wilson studied history, art history, social sciences and ethnography at several German universities. During her studies at Jena, she was a member of the Sera Circle initiated by publisher Eugen Diederichs. In 1914, she completed her doctorate in Leipzig on the subject of Ornament on an ethnological and prehistoric basis. The following year, she married the art historian Kurt Heinrich Busse, who was close to the left wing of the Freideutsche Jugend; their son Konrad was born in 1929.

Together with her husband, Elisabeth Busse-Wilson was involved in the Freideutsche Jugend, she gave lectures and worked as a chronologist of the movement. Her book Die Frau und die Jugendbewegung was published in 1920, in which she assessed the "socialisation conditions of the female youth of the bourgeoisie without exception as discriminatory and subject to male moral laws". She held the view that existing psychological divergences between the sexes were not due to biological differences, but to socialisation-related aspects. Accordingly, she herself pursued the life plan of an academically educated woman throughout her life.

From 1921 to 1931, Elisabeth Busse-Wilson worked at the Leibniz Academy in Hanover and the adult education centre there, where she also gave lectures and published. In 1931, her essay The Moral Dilemma in Modern Girls' Education and the 300-page monograph The Life of St Elisabeth of Thuringia were published, the 700th anniversary of whose death fell in the same year. The work on Elisabeth of Thuringia met with mixed reactions: Colleagues accused her of having a "naive" and "sentimental" view of Elisabeth. Historian Ulrike Wiethaus, meanwhile, points to Busse-Wilson's feminist approach, according to which Elisabeth of Thuringia was a self-destructive young woman who, in the face of restrictive expectations and norms, developed suicidal tendencies that ended in an early death. Many historians reject Busse-Wilson's demystifying view, Thomas Mann and Hermann Hesse, on the other hand, commented favourably on the book. Despite these controversial discussions, Busse-Wilson's publication is regarded as the outstanding scholarly publication on Elisabeth of Thuringia in the 20th century.

Due to financial hardship, Busse-Wilson had to "capitulate in her persistent fight against giving up her 'educated middle-class status'". She earned some money by closing down a private library and had to move in with her son to live with his mother. She worked for a short time as a teacher and housemother at the Lietzschen Landerziehungsheim Haubinda, and in 1942 she moved to the Landerziehungsheim Gaienhofen on Lake Constance. During the last years of the war, she first lived in Überlingen on Lake Constance and later in Bonn. In 1948, after more than ten years of work, she completed her book on Annette von Droste-Hülshoff, but was unable to find a publisher. From the 1950s onwards, she was supported financially by her son Konrad († 2013), who was employed by UNESCO. Elisabeth Busse-Wilson died in 1974 at the age of 84 in a retirement home in Oberursel.
