= Bad Salzungen =

- Town
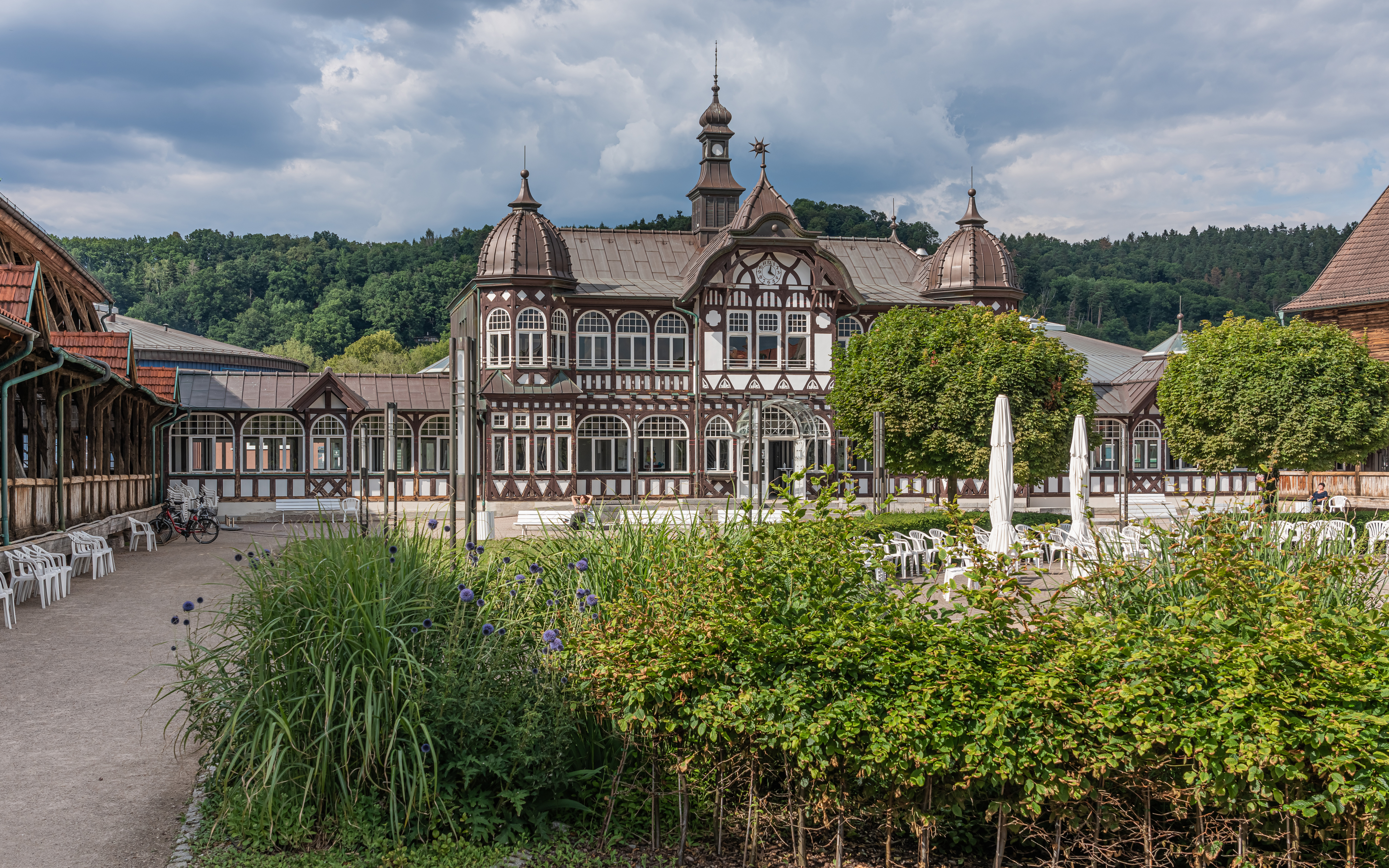
- Spa hall

- Coat of arms

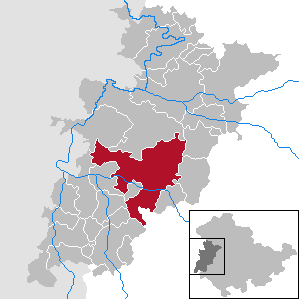
- Location of Bad Salzungen within Wartburgkreis district
- Interactive map of Bad Salzungen
- Location within Germany Location within Thuringia
- Coordinates: 50°48′42″N 10°14′0″E
- Country: Germany
- State: Thuringia
- District: Wartburgkreis
- Subdivisions: 22

Government
  - Mayor (2024–30): Klaus Bohl

Area
  - Total: 152.02 km^{2} (58.70 sq mi)
- Elevation: 241 m (791 ft)

Population (2025-12-31)
  - Total: 22,557
  - Density: 148.38/km^{2} (384.31/sq mi)
- Time zone: UTC+01:00 (CET)
  - Summer (DST): UTC+02:00 (CEST)
- Postal codes: 36433
- Dialling codes: 03695
- Vehicle registration: WAK, EA, SLZ
- Website: www.badsalzungen.de

Bad Salzungen (German: [baːt ˈzalt͡sʊŋən]) is a town in Thuringia, Germany. It is the capital of the Wartburgkreis district.

== Geography ==
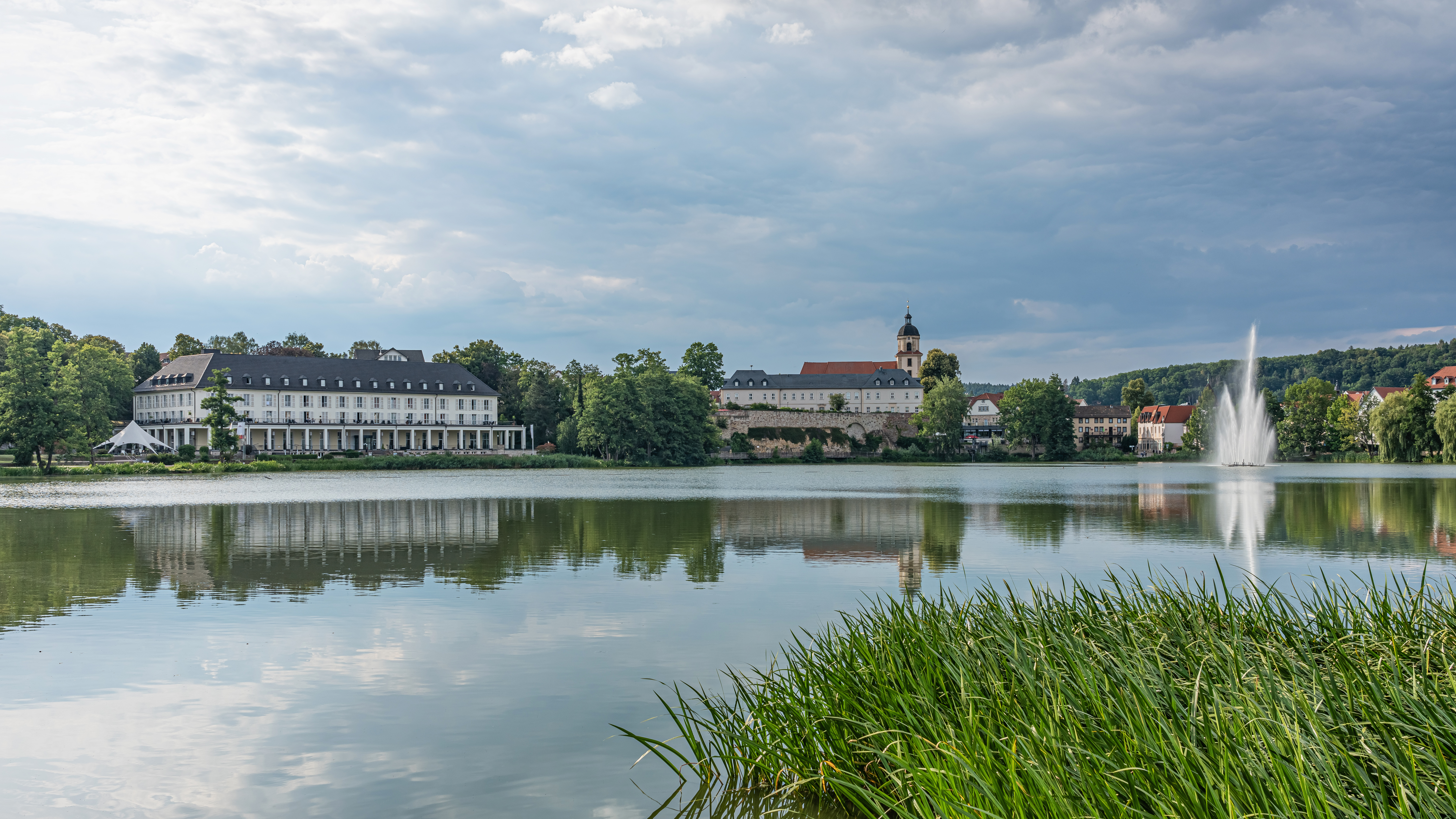
Burgsee

=== Location ===
Bad Salzungen is situated on the river Werra, 5 kilometres (3.1 mi) east of Tiefenort and 20 kilometres (12.4 mi) south of Eisenach.

=== Divisions ===
In July 2018 the former municipalities of Ettenhausen an der Suhl, Frauensee and Tiefenort were merged into Bad Salzungen. In December 2020 the former municipality Moorgrund was absorbed. In total the municipality consists of the central town (Kernstadt) and 21 sections (Ortsteile).

=== Neighbouring communities ===
Bad Salzungen borders on the following municipalities, from the south and clockwise: Dermbach, Weilar, Leimbach, Krayenberggemeinde, Vacha, Werra-Suhl-Tal, Gerstungen, Ruhla, Bad Liebenstein, Barchfeld-Immelborn (all in Wartburgkreis), and Breitungen in Schmalkalden-Meiningen district.

== Twin towns – sister cities ==
Bad Salzungen is twinned with:

- Mezőkövesd, Hungary (1969)
- Strakonice, Czech Republic (1977)
- Bad Hersfeld, Germany (1990)
- Ishøj, Denmark (1994)

== Infrastructure ==
Near the town, there is a Bundeswehr barrack, the Werratal-Kaserne, which was built in 1972 for the GDR Army.

Bad Salzungen station is located on the Eisenach–Lichtenfels railway.

== Notable people ==
- Johann Theodor Roemhildt (1684-1756), Baroque composer
- Richard Mühlfeld (1856-1907), clarinettist
- Heinrich Beck (1878-1937), engineer and inventor of the Beck arc lamp and headlamp Beck
- Fritz Wagner (1895-1966), a machinist, Reichsbanner-official, party official (SPD/SED) and chairman of the council of Meiningen district
- Gerhard Unger (1916-2011), tenor
- Thomas Hertel (1951-2024), composer
- Hans-Ulrich Jörges (born 1951), journalist, Stern magazine
- Christian Schaft (born 1971), German politician
- Steffen Skel (born 1972), luger
- Alexander Zickler (born 1974), soccer player and German international
- Mark Zimmermann (born 1974), football player and coach at FC Carl Zeiss Jena
- Ronny Ackermann (born 1977), Nordic Combined
- Christian Hirte (born 1976), politician (CDU)
- Marcus Malsch (born 1978), politician (CDU)
- Philipp Marschall (born 1988), biathlete and former cross-country skier
- Thomas Bing (born 1990), cross-country skier
