= Ebenshausen =

- Ortsteil of Amt Creuzburg
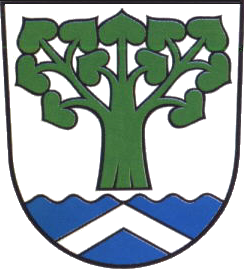
- Coat of arms
- Interactive map of Ebenshausen
- Location within Germany Location within Thuringia
- Coordinates: 51°5′15″N 10°18′29″E
- Country: Germany
- State: Thuringia
- District: Wartburgkreis
- Town: Amt Creuzburg

Area
  - Total: 2.62 km^{2} (1.01 sq mi)
- Elevation: 191 m (627 ft)

Population (2018-12-31)
  - Total: 194
  - Density: 74.0/km^{2} (192/sq mi)
- Time zone: UTC+01:00 (CET)
  - Summer (DST): UTC+02:00 (CEST)
- Postal codes: 99826
- Dialling codes: 036924

Ebenshausen (German pronunciation: [eːbn̩sˈhaʊzn̩]) is a village and a former municipality in the Wartburgkreis district of Thuringia, Germany. Since December 2019, it is part of the town Amt Creuzburg.
