= Wartburgkreis III =

Electoral constituency in Thuringia, Germany

Wartburgkreis III is an electoral constituency (German: Wahlkreis) represented in the Landtag of Thuringia. It elects one member via first-past-the-post voting. Under the current constituency numbering system, it is designated as constituency 7. It covers the northern part of Wartburgkreis.

Wartburgkreis III was created for the 1994 state election. Since 2014, it has been represented by Marcus Malsch of the Christian Democratic Union (CDU).

== Geography ==
As of the 2019 state election, Wartburgkreis III covers the northern part of Wartburgkreis, specifically the municipalities of Bad Liebenstein, Barchfeld-Immelborn, Berka vor dem Hainich, Bischofroda, Creuzburg, Ebenshausen, Frankenroda, Hallungen, Hörselberg-Hainich, Krauthausen, Lauterbach, Mihla, Moorgrund, Nazza, Ruhla, Seebach, Treffurt, and Wutha-Farnroda.

== Members ==
The constituency has been held by the Christian Democratic Union since its creation in 1994. Its first representative was Werner Grünert, who served from 1994 to 1999, followed by Gustav Bergemann (1999–2014) and Marcus Malsch (2014–present).

Election	Member	Party	%
1994	Werner Grünert	CDU	40.3
1999	Gustav Bergemann	CDU	47.7
2004	Gustav Bergemann	CDU	43.3
2009	Gustav Bergemann	CDU	34.6
2014	Marcus Malsch	CDU	37.0
2019	Marcus Malsch	CDU	29.0
2024	Marcus Malsch	CDU	46.3

== Election results ==
=== 2024 election ===
State election (2024): Wartburgkreis III
Notes:	Blue background denotes the winner of the electorate vote. Pink background denotes a candidate elected from their party list. Yellow background denotes an electorate win by a list member, or other incumbent. A ✓ or ✗ denotes status of any incumbent, win or lose respectively.						
Party	Candidate	Votes	%	±%	Party votes	%	±%
AfD					9,806	35.3	▲11.4
CDU	✓ Marcus Malsch	11,057	46.3	▲17.3	6,846	24.6	▲2.1
BSW					4,375	15.7	
FW	Andreas Boehme	5,145	21.6	▲18.7	460	1.7	
Left	Torsten Because	3,675	15.4	▼9.4	3,255	11.7	▼19.6
SPD	Katja Böhler	2,890	12.1	▲3.3	1,541	5.5	▼2.8
Greens					453	1.6	▼2.2
APT					304	1.1	Steady
FDP	Matthias Fallenstein	1,098	4.6	▲0.7	295	1.1	▼3.3
BD					125	0.4	
Familie					112	0.4	
Values					109	0.4	
Pirates					60	0.2	▼0.1
ÖDP					30	0.1	▼0.3
MLPD					22	0.1	▼0.2
Informal votes		4,297			369		
Total valid votes		23,865			27,793		
Turnout		28,162	74.1	▲8.4			
CDU hold	Majority	5,912	24.7	▲21.0			

=== 2019 election ===
State election (2019): Wartburgkreis III
Notes:	Blue background denotes the winner of the electorate vote. Pink background denotes a candidate elected from their party list. Yellow background denotes an electorate win by a list member, or other incumbent. A ✓ or ✗ denotes status of any incumbent, win or lose respectively.						
Party	Candidate	Votes	%	±%	Party votes	%	±%
CDU	✓ Marcus Malsch	7,971	29.0	▼8.0	6,204	22.5	▼11.4
AfD	Klaus Stöber	6,944	25.3		6,576	23.9	▲14.9
Left	Anke Wirsing	6,799	24.8	▼4.4	8,628	31.3	▲3.6
SPD	Lutz Kromke	2,424	8.8	▼7.8	2,273	8.3	▼5.6
Greens	Elias Bohn	1,343	4.9	▲0.6	1,050	3.8	▼0.8
FDP	Sebastian Bethge	1,079	3.9	▲1.4	1,222	4.4	▲2.1
Free Voters	Andreas Böhme	792	2.9	▼2.2			
MLPD	Joachim Gärtner	99	0.4		76	0.3	
List-only parties					1,514	5.5	
Informal votes		479			387		
Total valid votes		27,451			27,543		
Turnout		27,930	65.7	▲12.0			
CDU hold	Majority	1,027	3.7	▼4.1			

=== 2014 election ===
State election (2014): Wartburgkreis III
Notes:	Blue background denotes the winner of the electorate vote. Pink background denotes a candidate elected from their party list. Yellow background denotes an electorate win by a list member, or other incumbent. A ✓ or ✗ denotes status of any incumbent, win or lose respectively.						
Party	Candidate	Votes	%	±%	Party votes	%	±%
CDU	Marcus Malsch	8,695	37.0	▲2.4	8,015	31.3	▲2.6
Left	Hans-Jörg Lessig	6,873	29.2	▲5.1	6,548	27.7	▲1.3
SPD	Matthias Kehr	3,896	16.6	▼1.9	3,290	13.9	▼6.7
AfD					2,136	9.0	
NPD	Hendrik Tilmann Heller	1,273	5.4	▲0.3	1,118	4.7	▼0.2
Free Voters	Andreas Böhme	1,196	5.1	▼2.3	520	2.2	▼2.6
Greens	Danilo Saft	1,002	4.3	▼1.0	1,092	4.6	▼0.5
FDP	Fred Leise	584	2.5	▼2.6	545	2.3	▼3.8
List-only parties					353	1.5	
Informal votes		473			375		
Total valid votes		23,519			23,617		
Turnout		23,992	53.7	▼2.6			
CDU hold	Majority	1,822	7.8	▼2.7			

=== 2009 election ===
State election (2009): Wartburgkreis III
Notes:	Blue background denotes the winner of the electorate vote. Pink background denotes a candidate elected from their party list. Yellow background denotes an electorate win by a list member, or other incumbent. A ✓ or ✗ denotes status of any incumbent, win or lose respectively.						
Party	Candidate	Votes	%	±%	Party votes	%	±%
CDU	✓ Gustav Bergemann	9,091	34.6	▼8.7	8,260	31.3	▼11.4
Left	Sascha Bilay	6,333	24.1	▼5.2	6,953	26.4	▲0.3
SPD	Sabine Doht	4,853	18.5	▼0.2	5,442	20.6	▲4.5
Free Voters	Andreas Böhme	1,934	7.4		1,262	4.8	▲1.2
Greens	Danilo Saft	1,402	5.3	▲1.4	1,342	5.1	▲1.3
NPD	Karsten Höhn	1,335	5.1		1,299	4.9	▲3.9
FDP	Fred Leise	1,328	5.1	▲0.4	1,608	6.1	▲3.0
List-only parties					188	0.7	
Informal votes		605			527		
Total valid votes		26,276			26,354		
Turnout		26,881	56.3	▲1.3			
CDU hold	Majority	2,758	10.5	▼2.5			

=== 2004 election ===
State election (2004): Wartburgkreis III
Notes:	Blue background denotes the winner of the electorate vote. Pink background denotes a candidate elected from their party list. Yellow background denotes an electorate win by a list member, or other incumbent. A ✓ or ✗ denotes status of any incumbent, win or lose respectively.						
Party	Candidate	Votes	%	±%	Party votes	%	±%
CDU	✓ Gustav Bergemann	11,170	43.3	▼4.4	11,106	42.7	▼8.9
PDS	Rosel Neuhäuser	7,561	29.3	▲8.8	6,799	26.1	▲7.2
SPD	Sabine Doht	4,831	18.7	▼6.6	4,194	16.1	▼5.0
FDP	Rüdiger Schwanz	1,224	4.7	▲2.2	797	3.1	▲2.1
Greens	Stefan Schweßinger	1,016	3.9	▲1.9	980	3.8	▲2.0
List-only parties					2,126	8.2	
Informal votes		1,400			1,200		
Total valid votes		25,802			26,002		
Turnout		27,202	55.0	▼5.3			
CDU hold	Majority	3,609	14.0	▼8.4			

=== 1999 election ===
State election (1999): Wartburgkreis III
Notes:	Blue background denotes the winner of the electorate vote. Pink background denotes a candidate elected from their party list. Yellow background denotes an electorate win by a list member, or other incumbent. A ✓ or ✗ denotes status of any incumbent, win or lose respectively.						
Party	Candidate	Votes	%	±%	Party votes	%	±%
CDU	Gustav Bergemann	14,055	47.7	▲7.3	15,304	51.6	▲9.4
SPD	Sabine Doht	7,441	25.3	▼8.8	6,262	21.1	▼12.0
PDS	Hans-Jörg Lessig	6,031	20.5	▲7.3	5,590	18.9	▲5.4
FDP	Jürgen Bohn	725	2.5	▼4.2	306	1.0	▼2.6
REP	Johannes Müller	628	2.1		203	0.7	▼0.5
Greens	Michael Spielmann	582	2.0	▼3.5	530	1.8	▼3.0
List-only parties					1,438	4.9	
Informal votes		613			442		
Total valid votes		29,462			29,633		
Turnout		30,075	60.3	▼16.1			
CDU hold	Majority	6,614	22.4	▲16.1			

=== 1994 election ===
State election (1994): Wartburgkreis III
Notes:	Blue background denotes the winner of the electorate vote. Pink background denotes a candidate elected from their party list. Yellow background denotes an electorate win by a list member, or other incumbent. A ✓ or ✗ denotes status of any incumbent, win or lose respectively.						
Party	Candidate	Votes	%	±%	Party votes	%	±%
CDU	Werner Grünert	14,089	40.3		14,926	42.2	
SPD		11,941	34.1		11,718	33.1	
PDS		4,654	13.3		4,803	13.6	
FDP		2,359	6.7		1,270	3.6	
Greens		1,942	5.6		1,712	4.8	
List-only parties					977	2.8	
Informal votes		1,416			995		
Total valid votes		34,985			35,406		
Turnout		36,401	76.4				
CDU win new seat	Majority	2,148	6.2				
