= Moorgrund =

- Municipality
- Interactive map of Moorgrund
- Location within Germany Location within Thuringia
- Coordinates: 50°50′N 10°18′E
- Country: Germany
- State: Thuringia
- District: Wartburgkreis
- Disbanded: 2020

Area
  - Total: 53.52 km^{2} (20.66 sq mi)
- Elevation: 275 m (902 ft)

Population (2019-12-31)
  - Total: 3,358
  - Density: 62.74/km^{2} (162.5/sq mi)
- Time zone: UTC+01:00 (CET)
  - Summer (DST): UTC+02:00 (CEST)
- Postal codes: 36433
- Dialling codes: 03695

Moorgrund (German pronunciation: [ˈmoːɐ̯ˌɡʁʊnt]) is a former municipality in the Wartburgkreis district of Thuringia, Germany. In December 2020, it was merged into the town Bad Salzungen. The village Möhra was the home of Martin Luther's ancestors.

== Villages ==
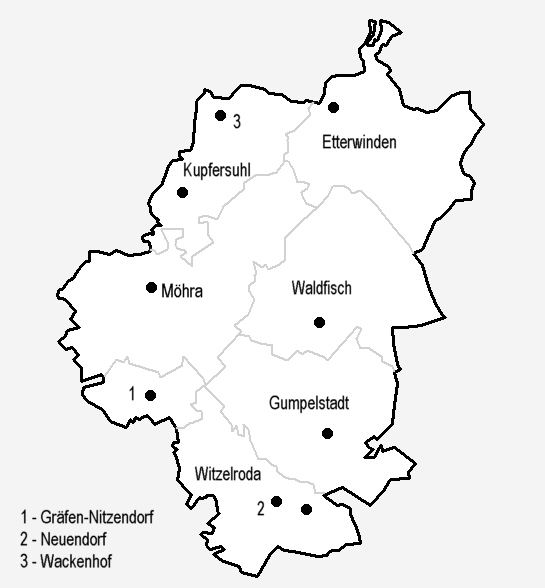
Constituent Villages

The villages in Moorgrund are:

- Etterwinden
- Gräfen-Nitzendorf
- Gumpelstadt (seat of the municipal administration)
- Kupfersuhl mit Ortsteil Wackenhof
- Möhra (home of Martin Luther's ancestors)
- Waldfisch
- Witzelroda mit Ortsteil Neuendorf
