= Mihla =

- Ortsteil of Amt Creuzburg
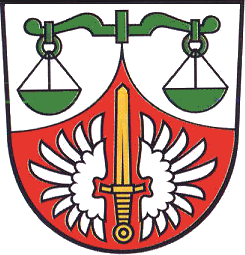
- Coat of arms
- Interactive map of Mihla
- Location within Germany Location within Thuringia
- Coordinates: 51°5′N 10°20′E
- Country: Germany
- State: Thuringia
- District: Wartburgkreis
- Town: Amt Creuzburg

Area
  - Total: 31.66 km^{2} (12.22 sq mi)
- Elevation: 200 m (660 ft)

Population (2018-12-31)
  - Total: 2,133
  - Density: 67.37/km^{2} (174.5/sq mi)
- Time zone: UTC+01:00 (CET)
  - Summer (DST): UTC+02:00 (CEST)
- Postal codes: 99826
- Dialling codes: 036924
- Website: www.mihla.de

Mihla (German pronunciation: [ˈmiːla]) is a village and a former municipality in the Wartburgkreis district of Thuringia, Germany. Since December 2019, it has been part of the town Amt Creuzburg.

== History ==
Within the German Empire (1871-1918), Mihla was part of the Grand Duchy of Saxe-Weimar-Eisenach.
