= Ransbach =

Ransbach may refer to:

- Ransbach-Baumbach, a town in the Westerwaldkreis in Rhineland-Palatinate, Germany
- Ransbach-Baumbach (Verbandsgemeinde), a "collective municipality" in the district Westerwaldkreis in Rhineland-Palatinate, Germany
- Ransbach (Hohenroda), a village and a municipal district of Hohenroda in Hersfeld-Rotenburg district in eastern Hesse, Germany
- Ransbach (Lauer), a river of Bavaria, Germany, tributary of the Lauer
