= Alfred Beck =

German footballer (1925–1994)

Personal information
- Date of birth: 12 April 1925
- Place of birth: Immelborn, Germany
- Date of death: September 1994 (aged 69)
- Position: Forward

Senior career*
Years	Team	Apps	(Gls)
1947–1949	Bremer SV		
1949–1955	FC St. Pauli		
1955–1958	Wuppertaler SV		
1958	FC Zürich		

International career
1954	West Germany	1	(1)

Managerial career
- 1958–1962: FC Thun
- 1962–1964: FC Aarau
- 1966–1967: FC Langenthal
- 1969–1970: FC Baden
- 1971–1973: FC Young Fellows Zürich
- 1976–1979: FC Wettingen
- * Club domestic league appearances and goals

Alfred Beck (12 April 1925 – September 1994) was a German footballer who played as a forward.

== Club career ==
Beck began his career at Bremer SV. He went on to play for FC St. Pauli and Wuppertaler SV before finishing his career with FC Zürich.

== International career ==
Beck played just once for West Germany in a friendly against England in December 1954. West Germany lost the match 3-1, with Beck scoring the team's only goal.

== Managerial career ==
After retiring from playing, Beck moved into management. He spent his entire managerial career in Switzerland, mostly in charge of clubs in the Swiss second division.
