= Amt Creuzburg =

- Town
- Coat of arms

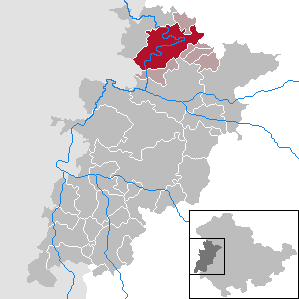
- Location of Amt Creuzburg within Wartburgkreis district
- Interactive map of Amt Creuzburg
- Location within Germany Location within Thuringia
- Coordinates: 51°3′5″N 10°14′41″E
- Country: Germany
- State: Thuringia
- District: Wartburgkreis
- Municipal assoc.: Hainich-Werratal

Government
  - Mayor (2020–26): Rainer Lämmerhirt

Area
  - Total: 76.8 km^{2} (29.7 sq mi)
- Elevation: 200 m (660 ft)

Population (2025-12-31)
  - Total: 4,910
  - Density: 63.9/km^{2} (166/sq mi)
- Time zone: UTC+01:00 (CET)
  - Summer (DST): UTC+02:00 (CEST)
- Postal codes: 99826, 99831
- Dialling codes: 036924, 036926
- Vehicle registration: WAK

Amt Creuzburg (German pronunciation: [amt ˈkʁɔʏtsbʊʁk]) is a town in the Wartburgkreis district, in Thuringia, Germany. It was created with effect from 31 December 2019 by the merger of the former municipalities of Creuzburg, Ebenshausen and Mihla. On 1 January 2024, it absorbed the former municipality Frankenroda. It takes its name from the town Creuzburg, the centre of the new municipality.
