= Seebach, Wartburgkreis =

Seebach
- Municipality
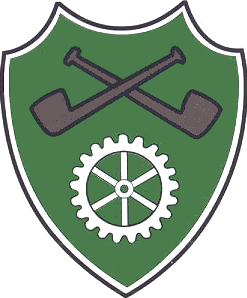
- Coat of arms

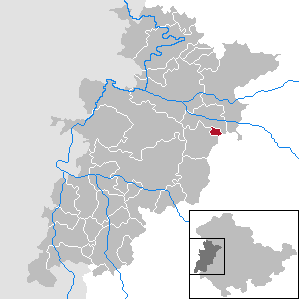
- Location of Seebach within Wartburgkreis district
- Interactive map of Seebach
- Location within Germany Location within Thuringia
- Coordinates: 50°54′53″N 10°25′16″E
- Country: Germany
- State: Thuringia
- District: Wartburgkreis

Government
  - Mayor (2024–30): Gerrit Häcker

Area
  - Total: 3.62 km^{2} (1.40 sq mi)
- Elevation: 350 m (1,150 ft)

Population (2025-12-31)
  - Total: 1,689
  - Density: 467/km^{2} (1,210/sq mi)
- Time zone: UTC+01:00 (CET)
  - Summer (DST): UTC+02:00 (CEST)
- Postal codes: 99846
- Dialling codes: 036929
- Vehicle registration: WAK

Seebach (German pronunciation: [ˈzeːbax]) is a municipality in the Wartburgkreis district of Thuringia, Germany.

== History ==
Within the German Empire (1871-1918), Seebach was part of the Grand Duchy of Saxe-Weimar-Eisenach.

== See also ==
- Media related to Seebach (Wartburgkreis) at Wikimedia Commons

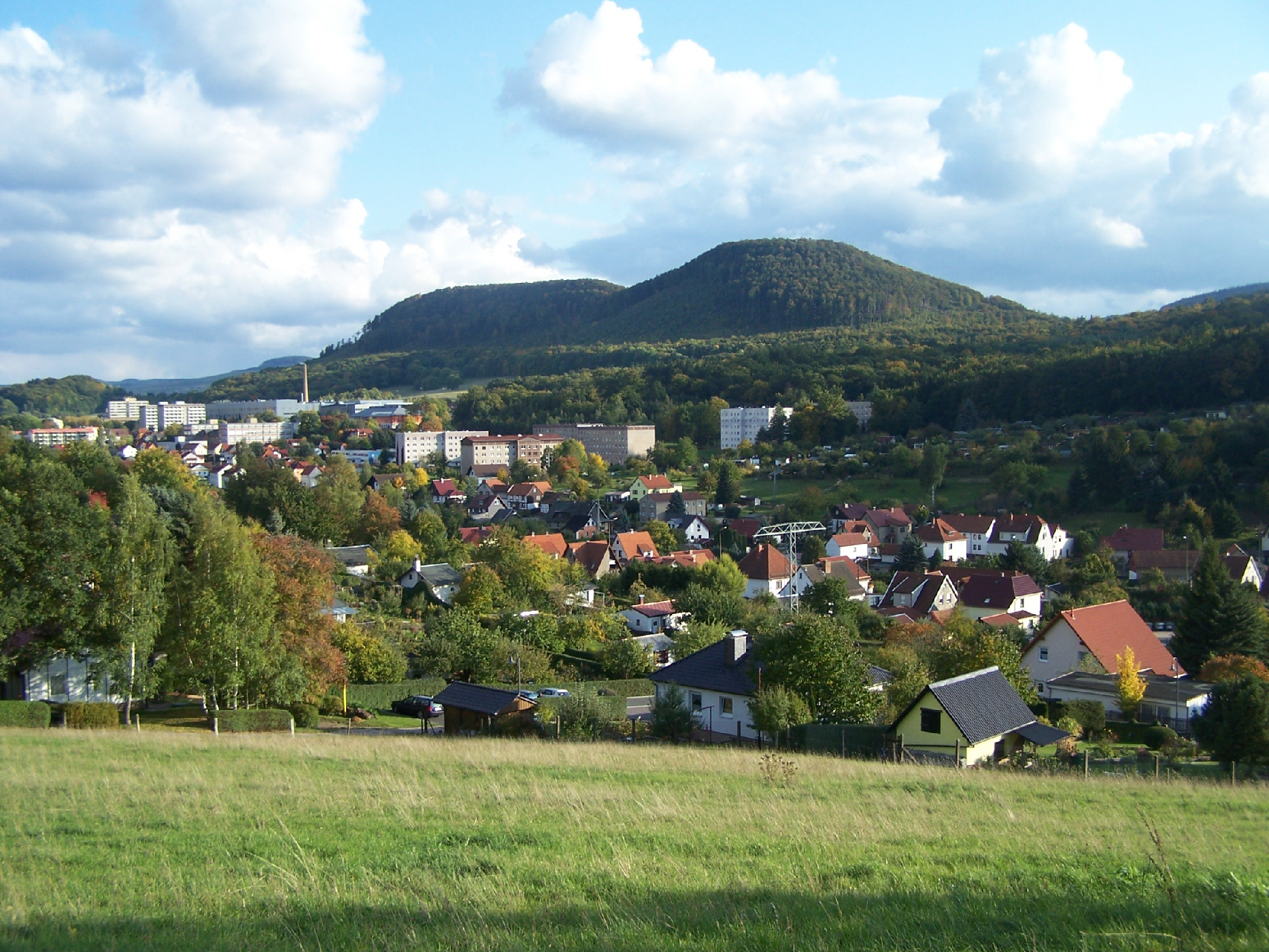
Seebach, Thuringia
