= Ausbach =

Village and municipal district in eastern Hesse, Germany

Coordinates: 50.8442°N 9.91278°E

- Village
- Location within Germany
- Country: Germany
- State: Hesse
- District: Hersfeld-Rotenburg
- Municipality: Hohenroda
- Time zone: UTC+1 (CET)
  - Summer (DST): UTC+2 (CEST)
- Postal code: 36286
- Area code: 06676
- ISO 3166 code: DE-HE

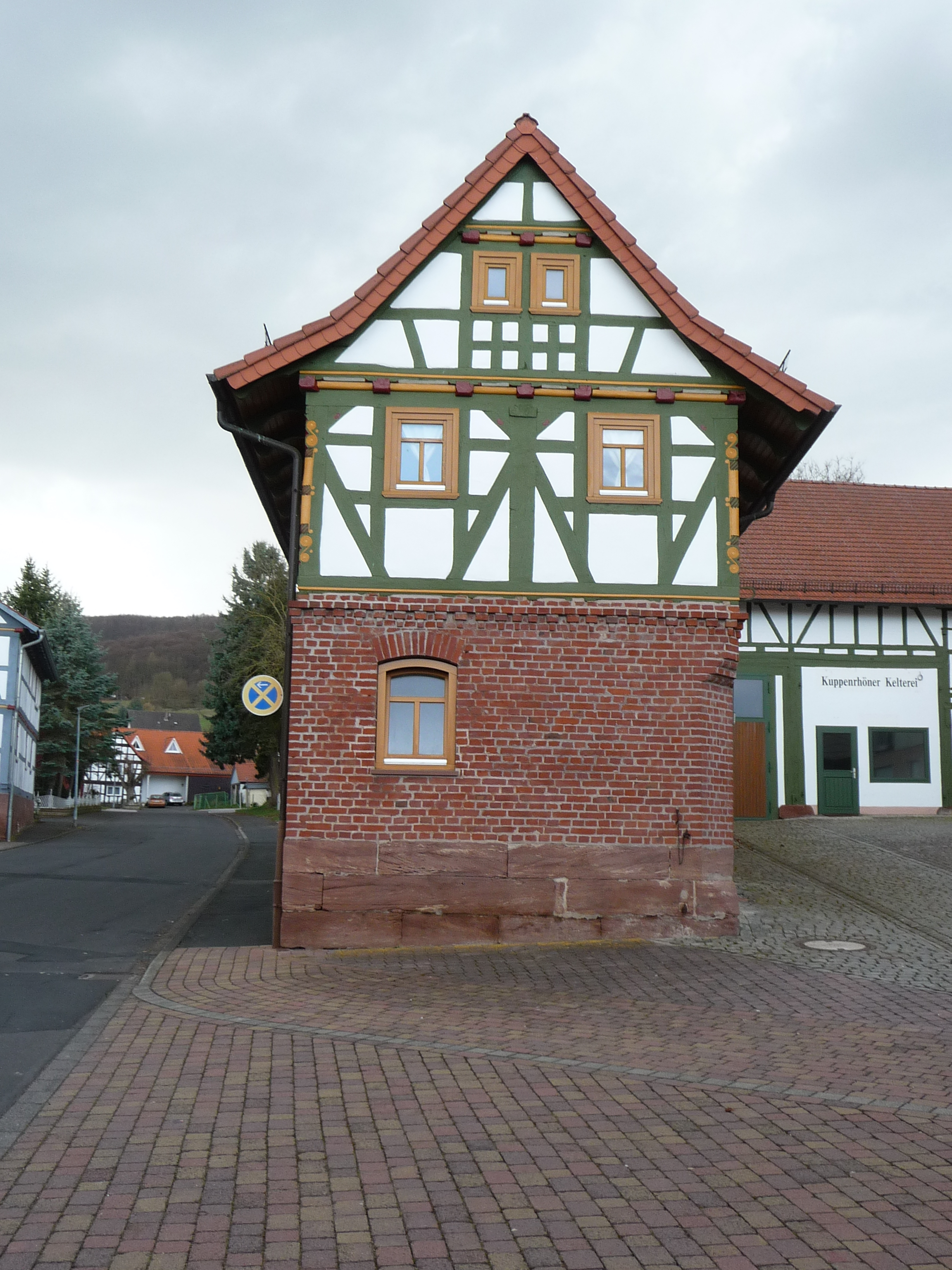
A house in Ausbach

Ausbach is a village and a municipal district of Hohenroda in Hersfeld-Rotenburg district in eastern Hesse, Germany.
