= Ifta =

- Ortsteil of Treffurt
- Interactive map of Ifta
- Location within Germany Location within Thuringia
- Coordinates: 51°4′N 10°11′E
- Country: Germany
- State: Thuringia
- District: Wartburgkreis
- Town: Treffurt

Area
  - Total: 17.69 km^{2} (6.83 sq mi)
- Elevation: 235 m (771 ft)

Population (2017-12-31)
  - Total: 1,100
  - Density: 62/km^{2} (160/sq mi)
- Time zone: UTC+01:00 (CET)
  - Summer (DST): UTC+02:00 (CEST)
- Postal codes: 99831
- Dialling codes: 036926
- Vehicle registration: WAK

Ifta (German pronunciation: [ˈɪfta]) is a former municipality in the Wartburgkreis district of Thuringia, Germany. Since 1 January 2019, it has been part of the town Treffurt.
