= Nazza =

- Municipality
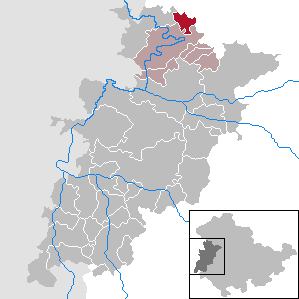
- Location of Nazza within Wartburgkreis district
- Interactive map of Nazza
- Location within Germany Location within Thuringia
- Coordinates: 51°6′N 10°20′E
- Country: Germany
- State: Thuringia
- District: Wartburgkreis
- Municipal assoc.: Hainich-Werratal

Government
  - Mayor (2018–24): Marcus Fischer

Area
  - Total: 12.68 km^{2} (4.90 sq mi)
- Elevation: 250 m (820 ft)

Population (2025-12-31)
  - Total: 531
  - Density: 41.9/km^{2} (108/sq mi)
- Time zone: UTC+01:00 (CET)
  - Summer (DST): UTC+02:00 (CEST)
- Postal codes: 99826
- Dialling codes: 036924
- Vehicle registration: WAK

Nazza (German pronunciation: [ˈnatsa]) is a municipality in the Wartburgkreis district of Thuringia, Germany.
