= Lauterbach, Thuringia =

Lauterbach
- Municipality
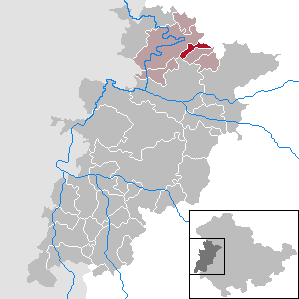
- Location of Lauterbach within Wartburgkreis district
- Interactive map of Lauterbach
- Location within Germany Location within Thuringia
- Coordinates: 51°4′11″N 10°21′7″E
- Country: Germany
- State: Thuringia
- District: Wartburgkreis
- Municipal assoc.: Hainich-Werratal

Government
  - Mayor (2022–28): Bernd Hasert

Area
  - Total: 6.62 km^{2} (2.56 sq mi)
- Elevation: 207 m (679 ft)

Population (2025-12-31)
  - Total: 650
  - Density: 98/km^{2} (250/sq mi)
- Time zone: UTC+01:00 (CET)
  - Summer (DST): UTC+02:00 (CEST)
- Postal codes: 99826
- Dialling codes: 036924
- Vehicle registration: WAK

Lauterbach (German pronunciation: [ˈlaʊtɐbax]) is a municipality in the Wartburgkreis district of Thuringia, Germany.
