= Christian Mengis =

German composer and horn player (1745–1766)

Christian Mengis (flourished c. 1745 – c. 1766) was a German composer and horn player of the late Baroque era.

== Life ==
Mengis was born in Treffurt, Thuringia. His birth year is unknown. On March 1, 1745 he became a "Kammermusikus" and horn player in the opera orchestra at the court of Frederick the Great in Berlin with a salary of 156 thalers. From 1762 to 1766 he was director of a newly founded concert series in which large vocal works were performed at the Justinschen Garten, Korsicaischen Haus and in hotels.

== Works ==
- Concerto for violin, strings and continuo in C major
- Concerto for flute, strings and continuo in G major
- Concerto for flute, strings and continuo in D minor
- Concerto for bassoon, strings and continuo in D minor (lost)
- Concerto for bassoon, 2 oboes and continuo in B-flat major (lost)
