= Bischofroda =

- Municipality
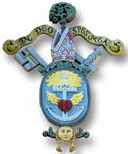
- Coat of arms

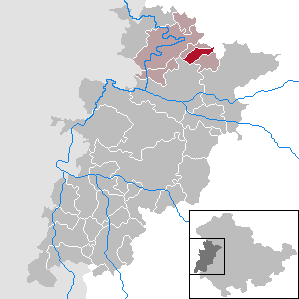
- Location of Bischofroda within Wartburgkreis district
- Interactive map of Bischofroda
- Location within Germany Location within Thuringia
- Coordinates: 51°3′26″N 10°21′50″E
- Country: Germany
- State: Thuringia
- District: Wartburgkreis
- Municipal assoc.: Hainich-Werratal

Government
  - Mayor (2022–28): Markus Riesner

Area
  - Total: 10.05 km^{2} (3.88 sq mi)
- Elevation: 225 m (738 ft)

Population (2025-12-31)
  - Total: 602
  - Density: 59.9/km^{2} (155/sq mi)
- Time zone: UTC+01:00 (CET)
  - Summer (DST): UTC+02:00 (CEST)
- Postal codes: 99826
- Dialling codes: 036924
- Vehicle registration: WAK

Bischofroda (German pronunciation: [bɪʃɔfˈʁoːda]) is a municipality in the Wartburgkreis district of Thuringia, Germany.
