= Frauensee =

- Stadtteil of Bad Salzungen
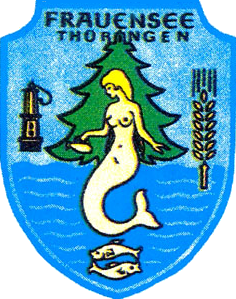
- Coat of arms
- Interactive map of Frauensee
- Location within Germany Location within Thuringia
- Coordinates: 50°53′N 10°8′E
- Country: Germany
- State: Thuringia
- District: Wartburgkreis
- Town: Bad Salzungen

Area
  - Total: 19.29 km^{2} (7.45 sq mi)
- Elevation: 280 m (920 ft)

Population (2016-12-31)
  - Total: 823
  - Density: 42.7/km^{2} (111/sq mi)
- Time zone: UTC+01:00 (CET)
  - Summer (DST): UTC+02:00 (CEST)
- Postal codes: 36460
- Dialling codes: 036963

Frauensee (German pronunciation: [ˈfʁaʊənˌzeː]) is a village and a former municipality in the Wartburgkreis district of Thuringia, Germany. Since July 2018, it is part of the town Bad Salzungen.

== Geography ==
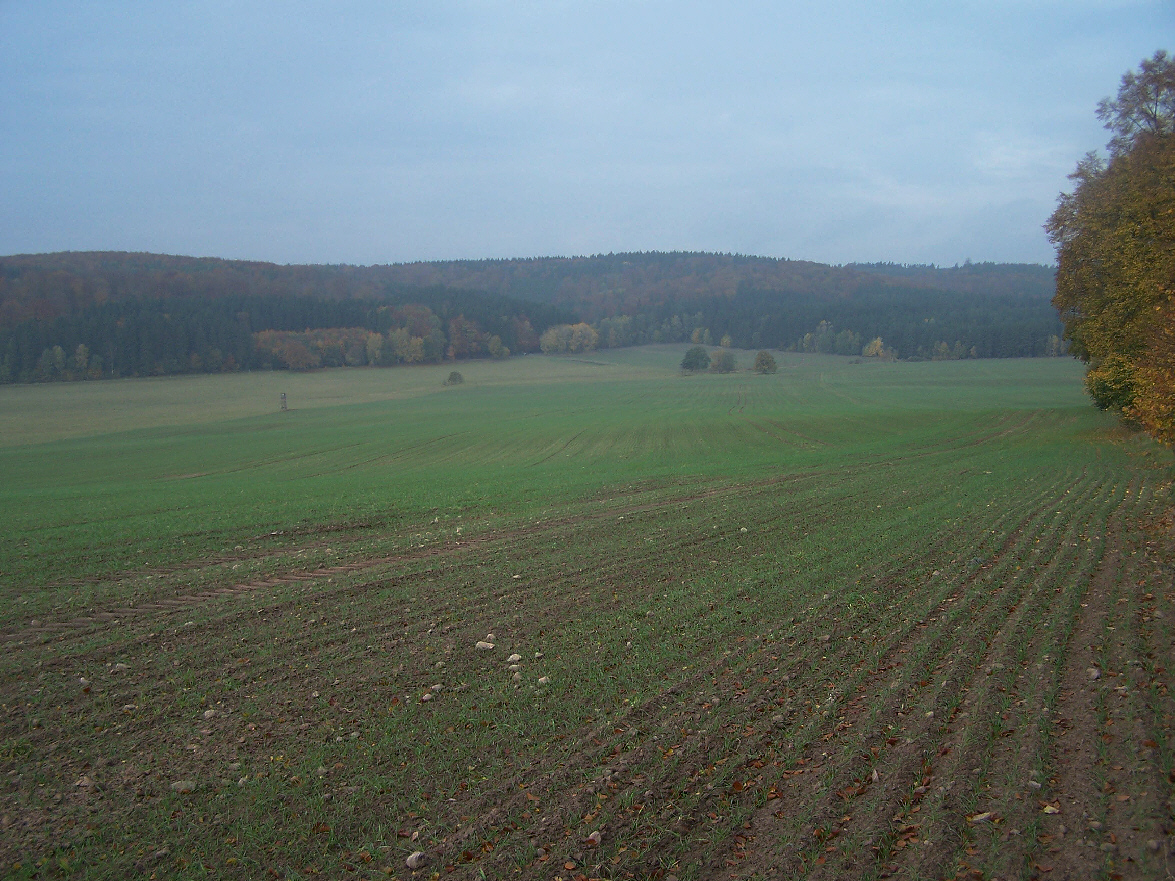
View of the Frauensee Forest

The countryside around Frauensee is dominated by the Frauensee Forest (Frauenseer Forst) with its kuppen, hills and high points, including the: Lehnberg (447.7 m above NN), Gertenberg (338 m above NN), Buchenberg (366.4 m above NN), Schälrück (388.1 m above NN) and Langer Rück (373.9 m above NN). The Schafberg (308.2 m above NN) is located right on the edge of Frauensee.

The region is part of the Frauensee Hills (Frauenseer Hügelland) and forms the northern part of the Salzungen Werra Upland. It is located right (north and east) of the Werra roughly in the triangle formed by Bad Salzungen, Philippsthal and Berka. It is part of the East Hesse Highlands
