= Oberbreitzbach =

Coordinates: 50.8064°N 9.92167°E

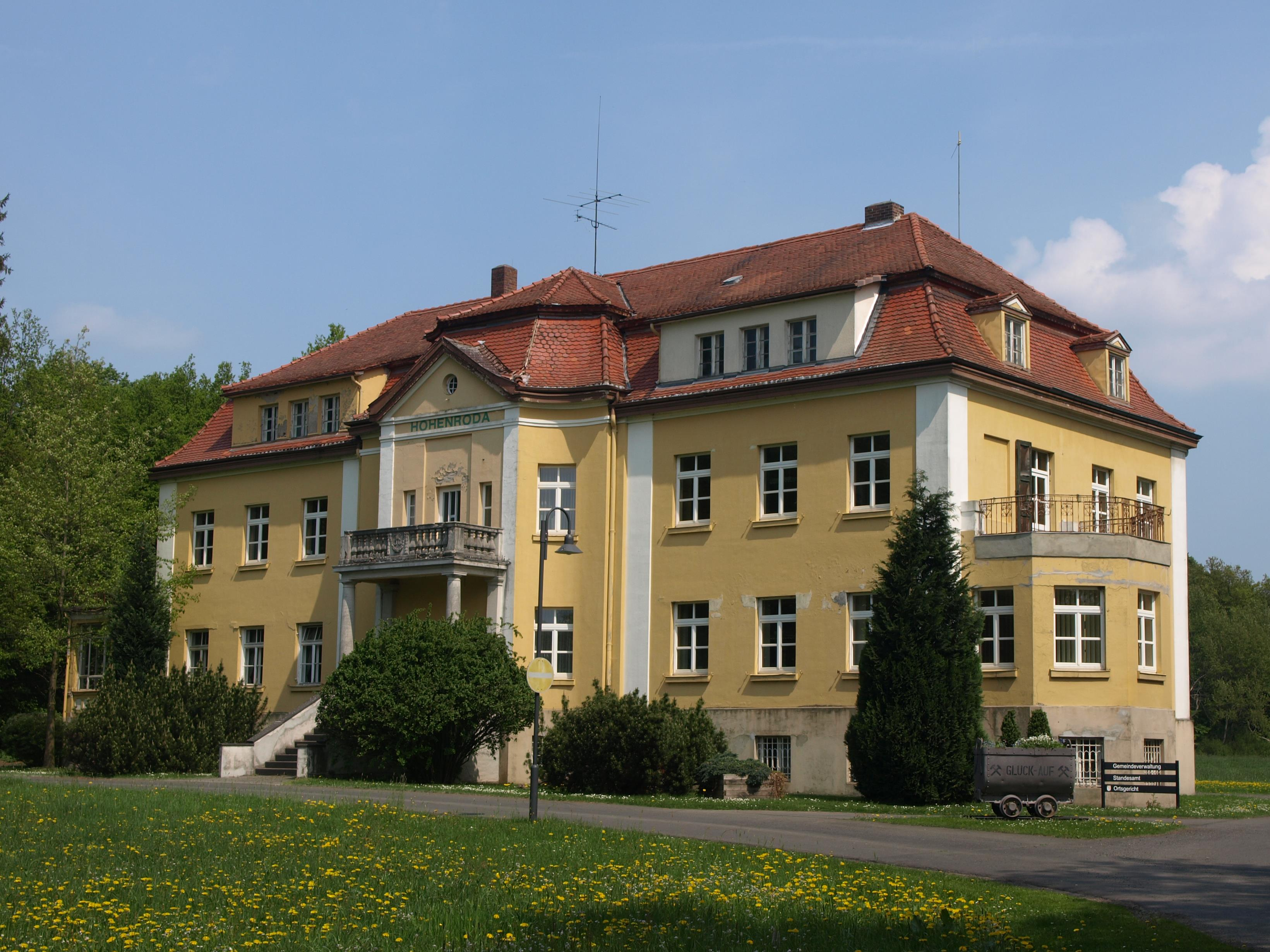
The city hall of Hohenroda.

Oberbreitzbach is a village and a municipal district of Hohenroda in Hersfeld-Rotenburg district in eastern Hesse, Germany.
