= Kreutzberg =

Kreutzberg is a German surname, and may refer to:

- Karl Kreutzberg (1912–1977), German field handball player
- Harald Kreutzberg (1902–1968), German dancer and choreographer
- Georg Kreutzberg (1932–2019), German neurobiologist

== See also ==
- Creuzberg (disambiguation)
- Kreuzberg (disambiguation)
- Kreuzburg (disambiguation)
