= Kreuzburg =

Kreuzburg and Kreutzburg are German place names meaning "cross castle" and may refer to:

- Kreuzburg, a village in the municipality of Groß Pankow (Prignitz), Germany
- Kreuzburg, the German name for a town in the former East Prussia, today Slavskoye, Russia
- Kreuzburg an der Bistritz, the German name for Piatra Neamț, Romania
- Kreuzburg O.S., the German name for Kluczbork, Opole Voivodeship, Poland
- Kreutzburg, the medieval name for the northern section of Jēkabpils, Latvia

== See also ==
- Creuzburg (disambiguation)
- Kreutzberg (disambiguation)
- Kreuzberg (disambiguation)
