= Treffurt =

- Town
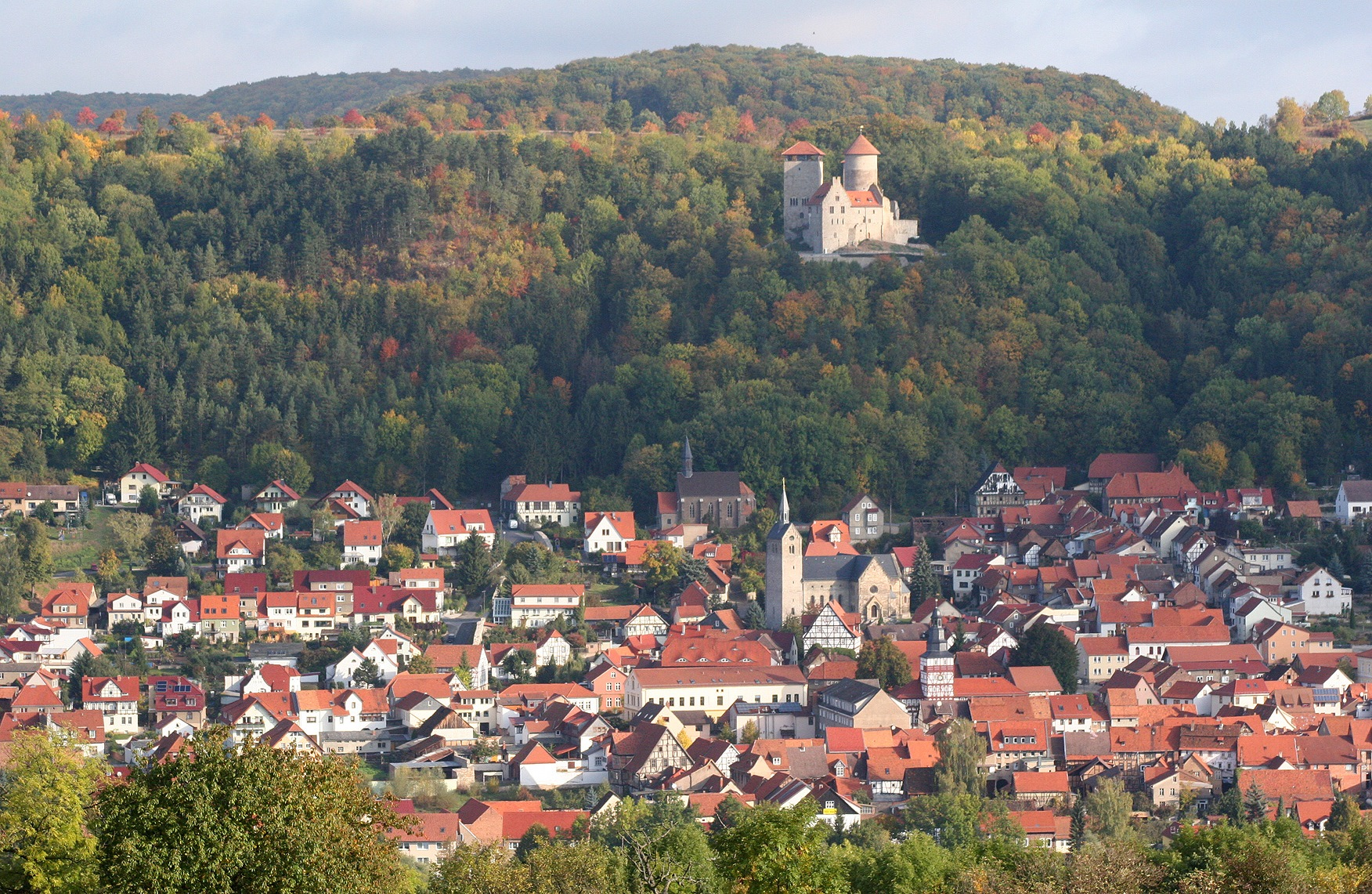

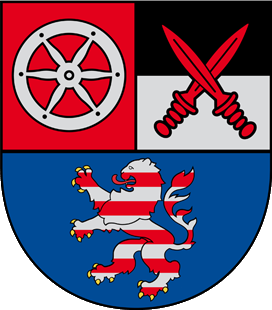
- Coat of arms

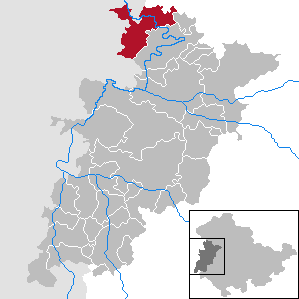
- Location of Treffurt within Wartburgkreis district
- Interactive map of Treffurt
- Location within Germany Location within Thuringia
- Coordinates: 51°8′12″N 10°14′15″E
- Country: Germany
- State: Thuringia
- District: Wartburgkreis
- Subdivisions: 4

Government
  - Mayor (2023–29): Michael Reinz (Ind.)

Area
  - Total: 72.46 km^{2} (27.98 sq mi)
- Elevation: 190 m (620 ft)

Population (2025-12-31)
  - Total: 5,772
  - Density: 79.66/km^{2} (206.3/sq mi)
- Time zone: UTC+01:00 (CET)
  - Summer (DST): UTC+02:00 (CEST)
- Postal codes: 99830
- Dialling codes: 036923
- Vehicle registration: WAK
- Website: www.treffurt.de

Treffurt (German pronunciation: [ˈtʁɛfʊʁt]) is a small town in the western region of the Wartburgkreis district which belongs to the federal state of Thuringia. The former municipality Ifta was merged into Treffurt in January 2019. The town lies near the Werra and is surrounded by the Werratal valley and rivers. Treffurt is located next to the Hessian border and was a former part of the Sperrzone. Today, Treffurt is a tourist destination, especially due to its scenic town centre with many restored half-timbered houses and its landmark - the Normannstein castle.

== Notable residents ==
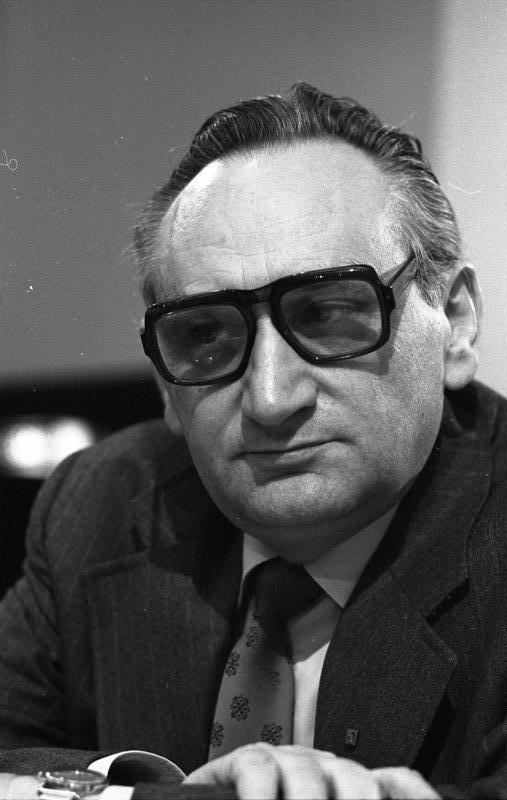
Egon Bahr in 1978

- Egon Bahr (1922-2015), German SPD politician
- Christian Mengis (flourished c.1745 – c.1766), composer and horn player
