= Immelborn =

- Ortsteil of Barchfeld-Immelborn
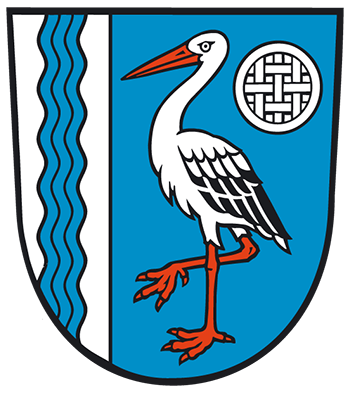
- Coat of arms
- Interactive map of Immelborn
- Location within Germany Location within Thuringia
- Coordinates: 50°48′N 10°17′E
- Country: Germany
- State: Thuringia
- District: Wartburgkreis
- Municipality: Barchfeld-Immelborn

Area
  - Total: 12.65 km^{2} (4.88 sq mi)
- Elevation: 242 m (794 ft)

Population (2011-12-31)
  - Total: 1,648
  - Density: 130.3/km^{2} (337.4/sq mi)
- Time zone: UTC+01:00 (CET)
  - Summer (DST): UTC+02:00 (CEST)
- Postal codes: 36433
- Dialling codes: 03695
- Vehicle registration: WAK

Immelborn (German pronunciation: [ˈɪml̩bɔʁn]) is a village and a former municipality in the Wartburgkreis district of Thuringia, Germany. Since 31 December 2012, it is part of the municipality Barchfeld-Immelborn.
