= Krauthausen =

- Municipality
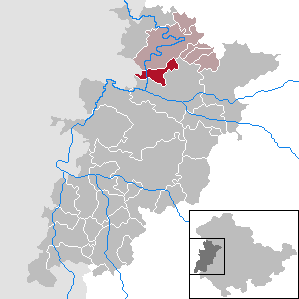
- Location of Krauthausen within Wartburgkreis district
- Interactive map of Krauthausen
- Location within Germany Location within Thuringia
- Coordinates: 51°1′2″N 10°16′12″E
- Country: Germany
- State: Thuringia
- District: Wartburgkreis
- Municipal assoc.: Hainich-Werratal

Government
  - Mayor (2021–27): Frank Moenke

Area
  - Total: 18.48 km^{2} (7.14 sq mi)
- Elevation: 230 m (750 ft)

Population (2025-12-31)
  - Total: 1,519
  - Density: 82.20/km^{2} (212.9/sq mi)
- Time zone: UTC+01:00 (CET)
  - Summer (DST): UTC+02:00 (CEST)
- Postal codes: 99819
- Dialling codes: 036926
- Vehicle registration: WAK

Krauthausen is a municipality in the Wartburgkreis district of Thuringia, Germany.
