= Creuzburg (surname) =

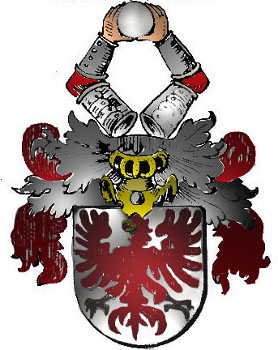
von Creuzburg coat of arms

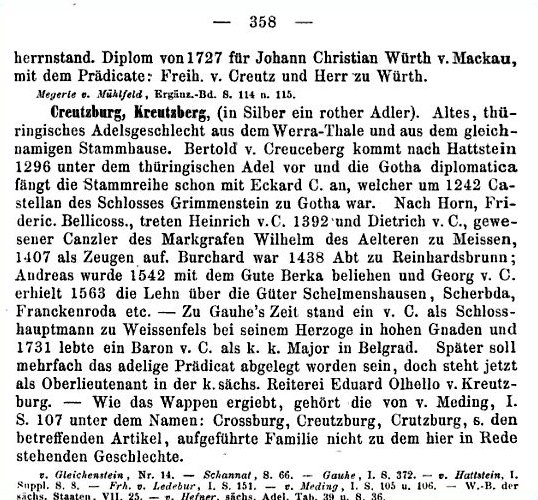
Extract from the New German Lexicon of Nobility referencing the Creuzburg name. Heinrich Kneschke, Leipzig 1860.

Creuzburg (also Creutzburg, sometimes Kreutzburg; in early forms also Cruce-/Cruciberg, -berch, -burch, -borg) is a German surname derived from an old noble family of knights in Thuringia, Germany.

== Origins ==
Creuzburg is a settlement or place name for the town of Creuzburg, Germany, and in particular a medieval castle Burg Cruezburg from the 12th century nearby. The first element of the name, Creuz, is derived from the Old High German word Kruci or Old Saxon word Kruzi, both borrowed from the Latin word crux (cross). The second element of the name refers to a castle, Creuzburg on the Werra, near Eisenach. The lords of Castle Creuzburg took the name von Creuzburg. The Burgmannen, guards, and fiefs not infrequently also took the name of the Castle. Burgmannen were members of the low aristocracy in the Middle Ages who defended castles. The role is roughly equivalent to the English castellan. Although they were paid for their services, they had to provide their own armour. In the Late Middle Ages, the system of Burgmann disappeared and the castles were protected by Landsknecht.

== Coat of arms ==
The von Creuzburg coat of arms consists of a red eagle on a silver field. On the helmet, two red arms dressed in silver hold a silver ball. The helmet covers are silver and red.

== Literature ==
- Regesta Diplomatica Necnon Epistolaria Historiae Thuringiae, Otto Dobenecker, Band II Teil 1,2, Band III, IV, Jena 1900
- Die Creuzburg. Kurt Langlotz 1941
- 900 Jahre Bischofroda, Walter Böttger 2004
- Deutsches Adels-Lexikon von Prof. Dr. Ernst Heinrich Kneschke, Leipzig 1860
- Genealogisch-Historisches Adels Lexicon von Johann Friedrich Gauhe, Leipzig 1740
- Genealogisches Handbuch des in Bayern immatrikulierten Adels Band XV, Vereinigung des Adels (E.V.), 1984
- Stammbuch des blühenden und abgestorbenen Adels, Bd. II, Regensburg 1863
- Die Wappen des hessischen und thüringischen Adels, J. Siebmacher 1977

== See also ==
- Heraldry
