= Weilar =

- Municipality
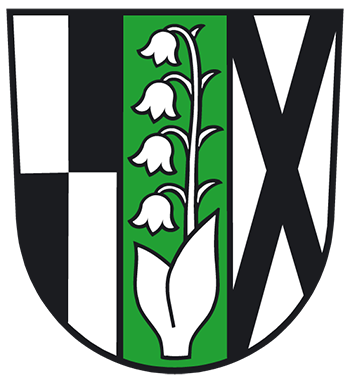
- Coat of arms

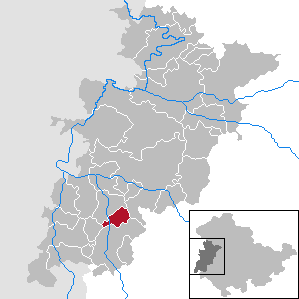
- Location of Weilar within Wartburgkreis district
- Interactive map of Weilar
- Location within Germany Location within Thuringia
- Coordinates: 50°45′N 10°9′E
- Country: Germany
- State: Thuringia
- District: Wartburgkreis

Government
  - Mayor (2022–28): Harald Fey

Area
  - Total: 14.29 km^{2} (5.52 sq mi)
- Elevation: 318 m (1,043 ft)

Population (2025-12-31)
  - Total: 772
  - Density: 54.0/km^{2} (140/sq mi)
- Time zone: UTC+01:00 (CET)
  - Summer (DST): UTC+02:00 (CEST)
- Postal codes: 36457
- Dialling codes: 036965
- Vehicle registration: WAK

Weilar is a municipality in the Wartburgkreis district of Thuringia, Germany.
