= Buttlar =

- Municipality
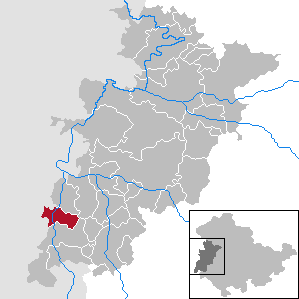
- Location of Buttlar within Wartburgkreis district
- Interactive map of Buttlar
- Location within Germany Location within Thuringia
- Coordinates: 50°45′32″N 9°57′15″E
- Country: Germany
- State: Thuringia
- District: Wartburgkreis

Government
  - Mayor (2022–28): Johannes Ritz (CDU)

Area
  - Total: 21.27 km^{2} (8.21 sq mi)
- Elevation: 260 m (850 ft)

Population (2025-12-31)
  - Total: 1,134
  - Density: 53.31/km^{2} (138.1/sq mi)
- Time zone: UTC+01:00 (CET)
  - Summer (DST): UTC+02:00 (CEST)
- Postal codes: 36419
- Dialling codes: 036967
- Vehicle registration: WAK

Buttlar is a municipality in the Wartburgkreis district of Thuringia, Germany.
