= Unterbreizbach =

- Municipality
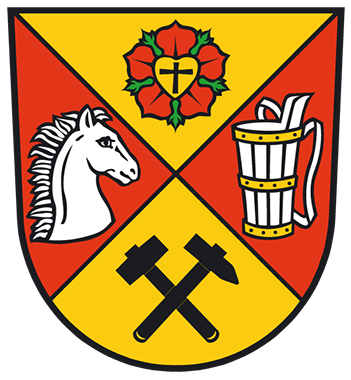
- Coat of arms

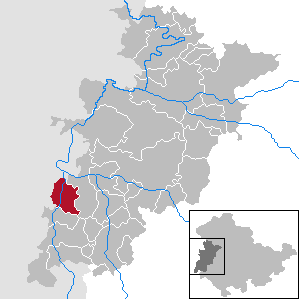
- Location of Unterbreizbach within Wartburgkreis district
- Interactive map of Unterbreizbach
- Location within Germany Location within Thuringia
- Coordinates: 50°49′N 9°59′E
- Country: Germany
- State: Thuringia
- District: Wartburgkreis

Government
  - Mayor (2024–30): Roland Ernst (SPD)

Area
  - Total: 30.00 km^{2} (11.58 sq mi)
- Elevation: 240 m (790 ft)

Population (2025-12-31)
  - Total: 3,261
  - Density: 108.7/km^{2} (281.5/sq mi)
- Time zone: UTC+01:00 (CET)
  - Summer (DST): UTC+02:00 (CEST)
- Postal codes: 36414
- Dialling codes: 036962
- Vehicle registration: WAK
- Website: www.unterbreizbach.de

Unterbreizbach is a municipality in the Wartburgkreis district of Thuringia, Germany.
