= Leimbach, Thuringia =

Leimbach
- Municipality
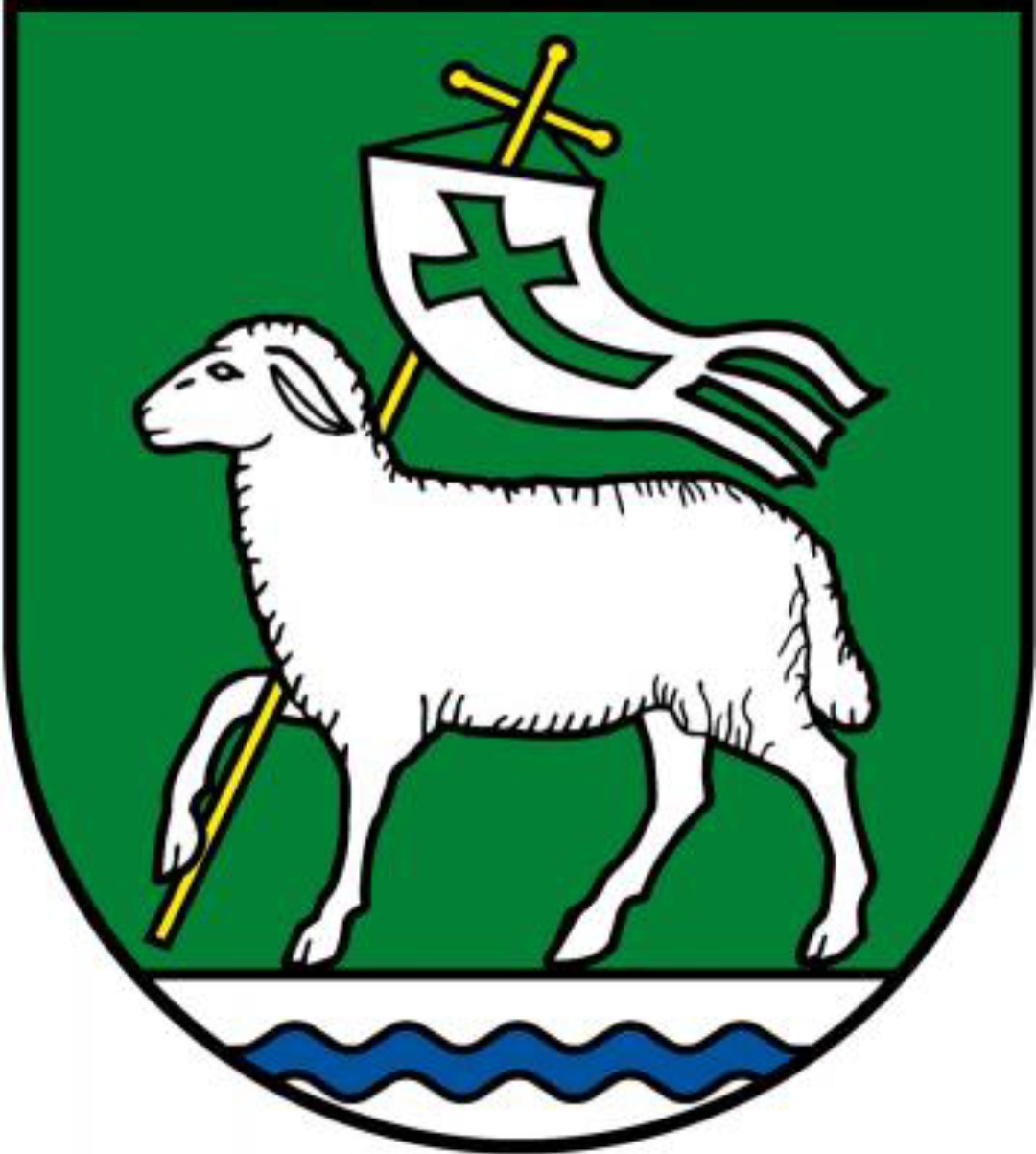
- Coat of arms

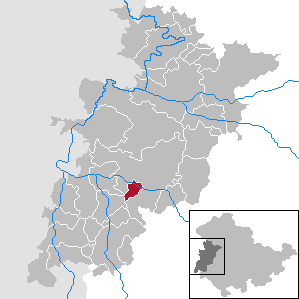
- Location of Leimbach within Wartburgkreis district
- Interactive map of Leimbach
- Location within Germany Location within Thuringia
- Coordinates: 50°49′N 10°12′E
- Country: Germany
- State: Thuringia
- District: Wartburgkreis

Government
  - Mayor (2022–28): Thomas Fischer (SPD)

Area
  - Total: 8.63 km^{2} (3.33 sq mi)
- Elevation: 247 m (810 ft)

Population (2025-12-31)
  - Total: 1,726
  - Density: 200/km^{2} (518/sq mi)
- Time zone: UTC+01:00 (CET)
  - Summer (DST): UTC+02:00 (CEST)
- Postal codes: 36433
- Dialling codes: 03695
- Vehicle registration: WAK

Leimbach (German: [ˈlaɪmbax]) is a municipality in the Wartburgkreis district of Thuringia, Germany.
