= Mansbach =

- Ortsteil of Hohenroda
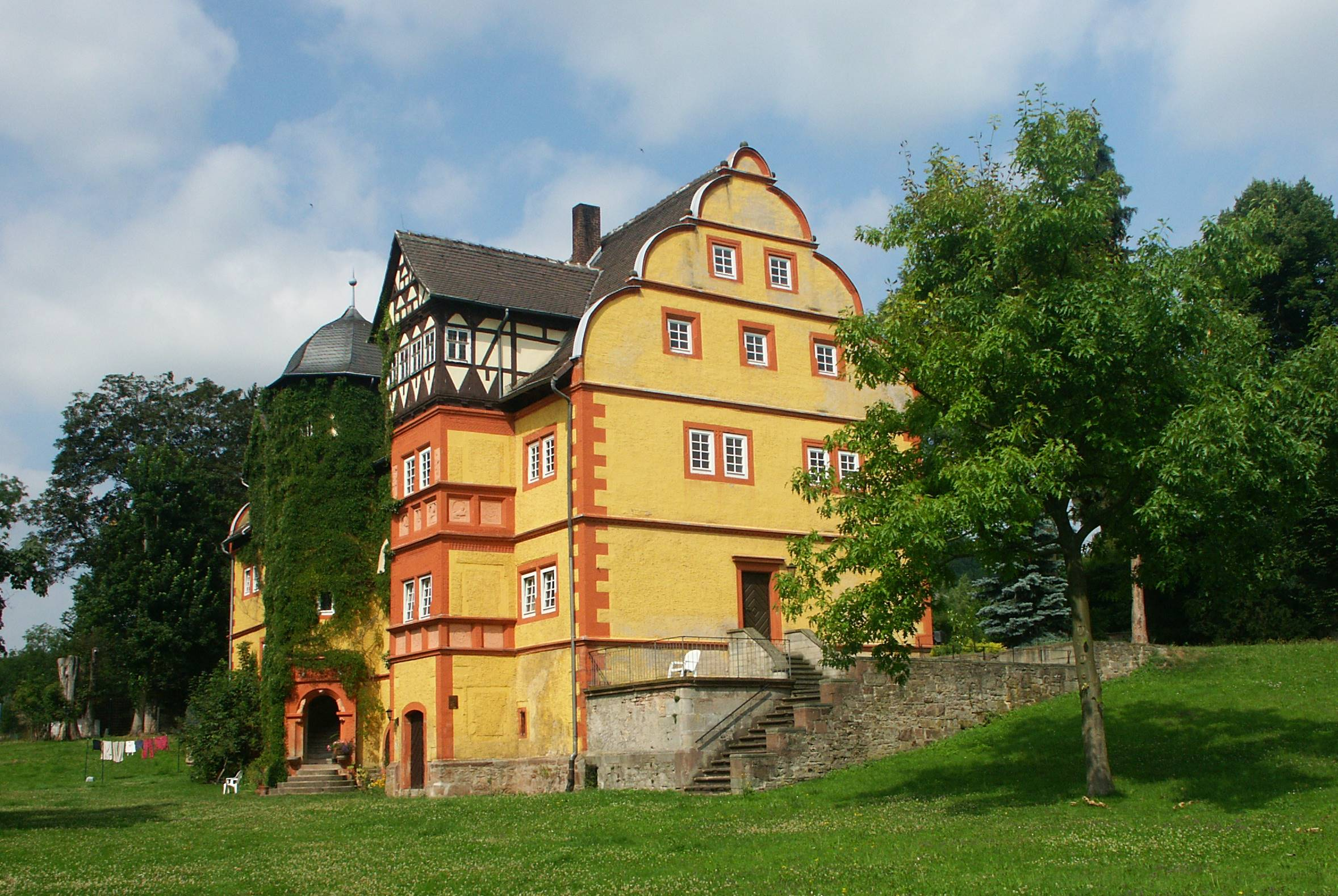
- Residence of the noble family Geyso.
- Interactive map of Mansbach
- Location within Germany Location within Hesse
- Coordinates: 50°47′0″N 9°55′50″E
- Country: Germany
- State: Hesse
- District: Hersfeld-Rotenburg
- Municipality: Hohenroda
- Time zone: UTC+01:00 (CET)
  - Summer (DST): UTC+02:00 (CEST)

Mansbach is a village and a municipal district of Hohenroda in Hersfeld-Rotenburg district in eastern Hesse, Germany.

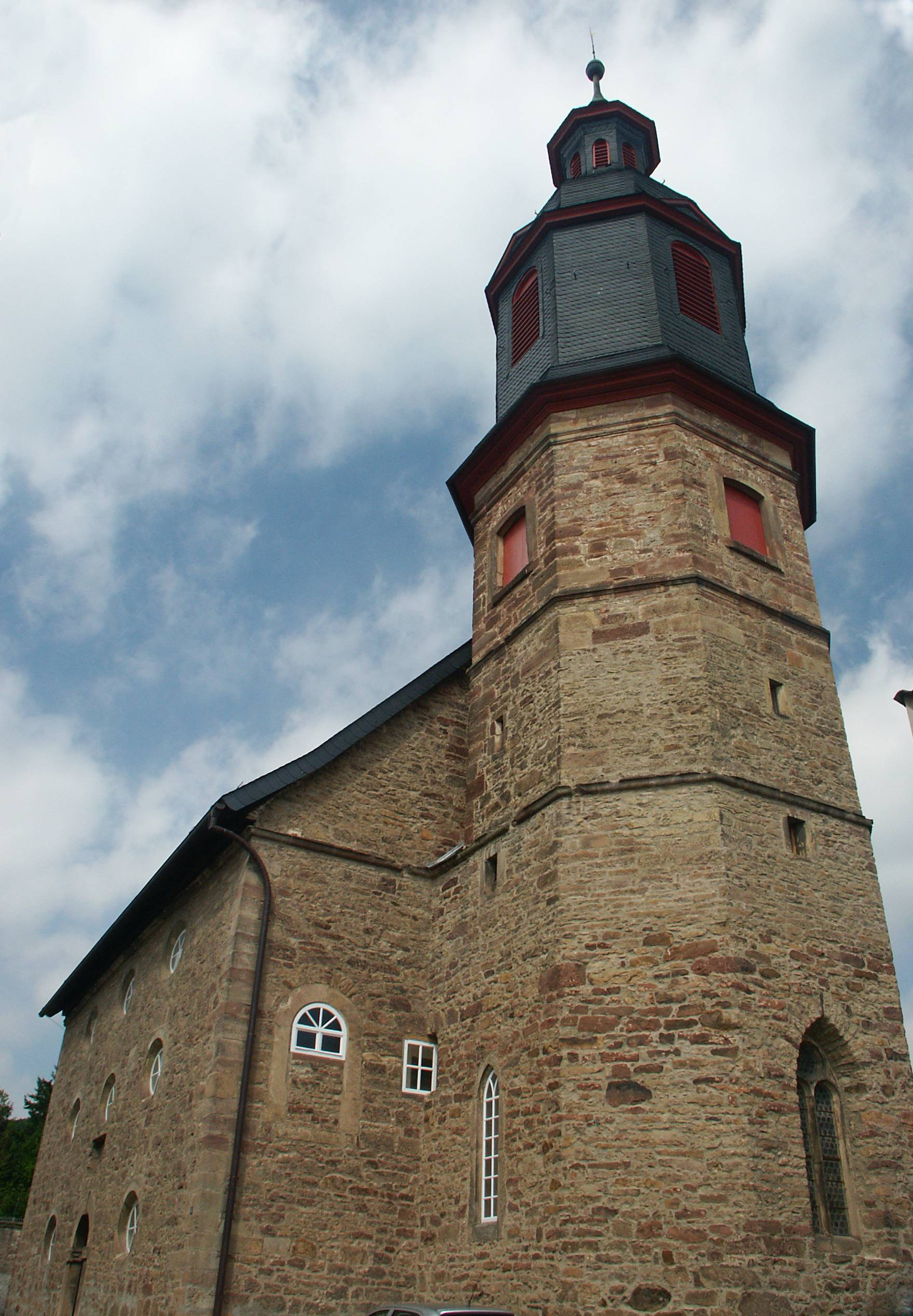
The church of Mansbach.
