= Ransbach, Hesse =

Ransbach
- Village of Hohenroda
- Interactive map of Ransbach
- Location within Germany Location within Hesse
- Coordinates: 50.8258°N 9.9081°E
- Country: Germany
- State: Hesse
- District: Hersfeld-Rotenburg
- Municipality: Hohenroda
- Time zone: UTC+01:00 (CET)
  - Summer (DST): UTC+02:00 (CEST)

Ransbach (German pronunciation: [ˈʁansbax]) is a village and a municipal district of Hohenroda in Hersfeld-Rotenburg district in eastern Hesse, Germany.
