= Kreuzberg (Bavarian Prealps) =

Coordinates: 47°36′45″N 11°55′59″E

Kreuzberg (Bayerische Voralpen)
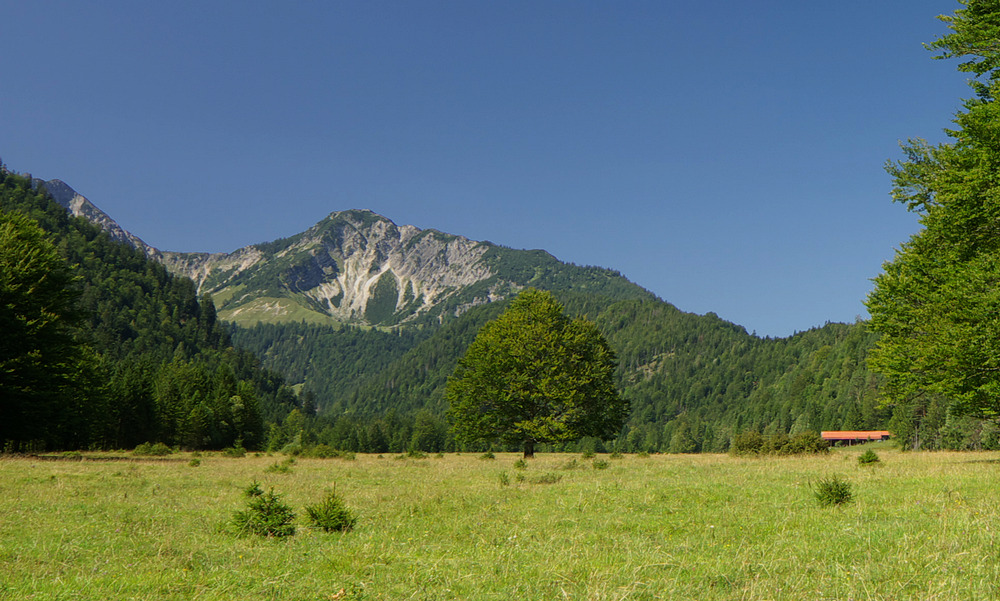

Highest point
- Elevation: 1,715.6 m (5,629 ft)

Geography
- Location: Bavaria, Germany

Kreuzberg (Bayerische Voralpen) is a mountain of Bavaria, Germany.
