= Barchfeld-Immelborn =

- Municipality
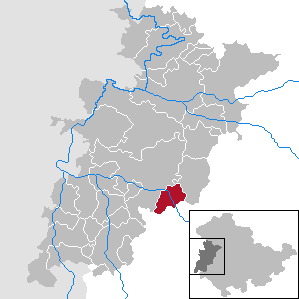
- Location of Barchfeld-Immelborn within Wartburgkreis district
- Interactive map of Barchfeld-Immelborn
- Location within Germany Location within Thuringia
- Coordinates: 50°48′N 10°18′E
- Country: Germany
- State: Thuringia
- District: Wartburgkreis

Government
  - Mayor (2022–28): Ralph Groß (CDU)

Area
  - Total: 23.98 km^{2} (9.26 sq mi)
- Elevation: 254 m (833 ft)

Population (2025-12-31)
  - Total: 4,268
  - Density: 178.0/km^{2} (461.0/sq mi)
- Time zone: UTC+01:00 (CET)
  - Summer (DST): UTC+02:00 (CEST)
- Postal codes: 36433, 36456
- Dialling codes: 03695, 036961
- Vehicle registration: WAK
- Website: www.barchfeld-immelborn.de

Barchfeld-Immelborn (German pronunciation: [ˈbaʁçfɛlt ˈʔɪml̩bɔʁn]) is a municipality in the Wartburgkreis district of Thuringia, Germany. It was formed on 31 December 2012 by the merger of the former municipalities Barchfeld and Immelborn. The river Werra flows through the municipality.
