= Marcus Malsch =

German politician (born 1978)

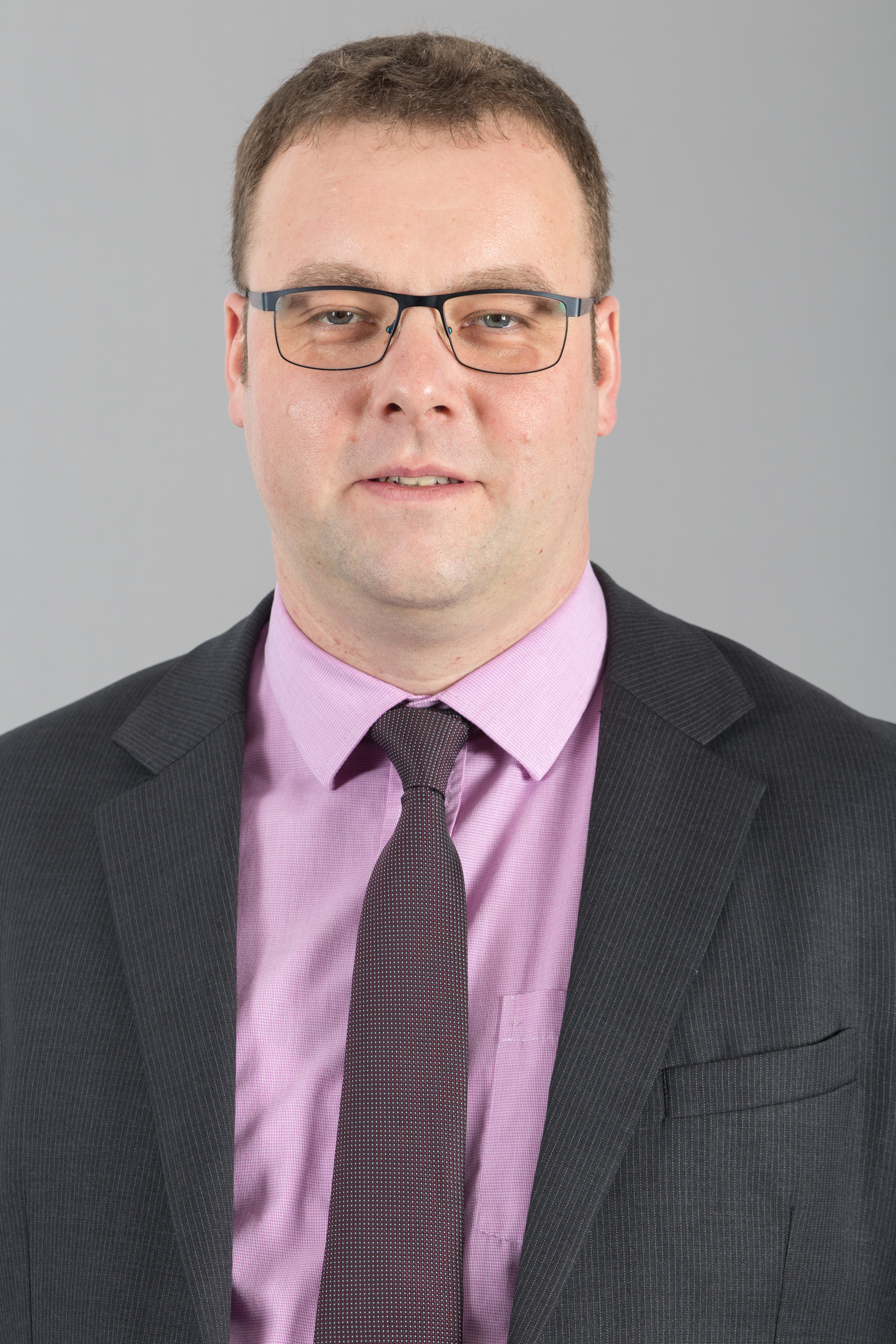
- Malsch in 2016

Member of the Landtag of Thuringia
- In office 14 October 2014 – 7 January 2025
- Preceded by: Gustav Bergemann
- Succeeded by: Thomas Gottweiss
- Constituency: Wartburgkreis III

Personal details
- Born: 16 January 1978 (age 48) Bad Salzungen
- Party: Christian Democratic Union

Marcus Malsch (born 16 January 1978 in Bad Salzungen) is a German politician serving as state secretary of the Ministry of Economic Affairs, Agriculture and Rural Areas of Thuringia since 2024. From 2014 to 2025, he was a member of the Landtag of Thuringia.
