= Hainich-Werratal =

- Verwaltungsgemeinschaft
- Map of Wartburgkreis highlighting Hainich-Werratal
- Interactive map of Hainich-Werratal
- Location within Germany Location within Thuringia
- Coordinates: 51°05′N 10°20′E
- Country: Germany
- State: Thuringia
- District: Wartburgkreis
- Seat: Creuzburg
- Subdivisions: 6 municipalities

Area
  - Total: 139.59 km^{2} (53.90 sq mi)

Population (2025-12-31)
  - Total: 8,915
  - Density: 63.87/km^{2} (165.4/sq mi)
- Time zone: UTC+01:00 (CET)
  - Summer (DST): UTC+02:00 (CEST)
- Website: www.vg-hainich-werratal.de

Hainich-Werratal (before October 2014: Mihla) is a Verwaltungsgemeinschaft in the district Wartburgkreis in Thuringia, Germany. The seat of the Verwaltungsgemeinschaft is in Creuzburg (part of Amt Creuzburg).

The Verwaltungsgemeinschaft Hainich-Werratal consists of the following municipalities:

1. Amt Creuzburg
2. Berka vor dem Hainich
3. Bischofroda
4. Krauthausen
5. Lauterbach
6. Nazza
