= Wartburgkreis =

Coordinates: 50°55′N 10°15′E

- District
- Flag Coat of arms
- Country: Germany
- State: Thuringia
- Capital: Bad Salzungen

Government
  - District admin.: Michael Brodführer (CDU)

Area
  - Total: 1,371.13 km^{2} (529.40 sq mi)

Population (31 December 2024)
  - Total: 154,957
  - Density: 110/km^{2} (290/sq mi)
- Time zone: UTC+01:00 (CET)
  - Summer (DST): UTC+02:00 (CEST)
- Vehicle registration: WAK, EA, SLZ
- Website: www.wartburgkreis.de

Wartburgkreis (German pronunciation: [ˈvaʁtbʊʁkˌkʁaɪs], lit. 'Wartburg District') is a Kreis (district) in the west of Thuringia, Germany. Neighboring districts are (from the north clockwise) the districts Unstrut-Hainich-Kreis, Gotha, Schmalkalden-Meiningen, and the districts Fulda, Hersfeld-Rotenburg and Werra-Meißner-Kreis in Hesse. The district has 30 municipalities, including Eisenach.

== History ==
The district was created in 1994 by merging the previous districts Eisenach and Bad Salzungen, and a few municipalities from the district Bad Langensalza. The city Eisenach left the district in 1998 and became a district-free city and was incorporated into the district again on 1 July 2021. The municipality Kaltennordheim passed from the Wartburgkreis to Schmalkalden-Meiningen on 1 January 2019.

The district is named after the Wartburg, a castle near Eisenach most famous as the place of residence of Ludwig, Landgrave of Thuringia and his wife, Saint Elizabeth of Hungary; and, as Martin Luther's refuge in 1521.

== Geography ==
The district is located in the Thuringian Forest, including the Hainich national park. The main river in the district is the Werra.

== Coat of arms ==
The coat of arms combines the symbols of the historic states which existed on the territory. In the top left and the bottom right is the lion of the dukes of Thuringia, the fowl in the top right refers to the county Henneberg, and the black cross in the bottom left is the symbol of the imperial abbey and state of Fulda.

== Towns and municipalities ==
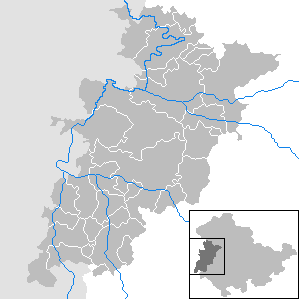
Clickable map of towns and municipalities in the district

Verwaltungsgemeinschaft-free towns
and municipalities
1. Bad Salzungen
2. Bad Liebenstein
3. Eisenach
4. Geisa
5. Ruhla
6. Treffurt
7. Vacha
8. Werra-Suhl-Tal
1. Barchfeld-Immelborn
2. Buttlar
3. Dermbach
4. Empfertshausen
5. Gerstengrund
6. Gerstungen
7. Hörselberg-Hainich
8. Krayenberggemeinde
9. Leimbach
10. Oechsen
11. Schleid
12. Seebach
13. Unterbreizbach
14. Weilar
15. Wiesenthal
16. Wutha-Farnroda

Verwaltungsgemeinschaften
- 1. Hainich-Werratal
1. Amt Creuzburg^{1,2}
2. Berka vor dem Hainich
3. Bischofroda
4. Krauthausen
5. Lauterbach
6. Nazza
^{1}seat of the Verwaltungsgemeinschaft; ^{2}town
