= Krayenburg =

Castle in Thuringia, German

Coordinates: 50°50′12″N 10°07′45″E

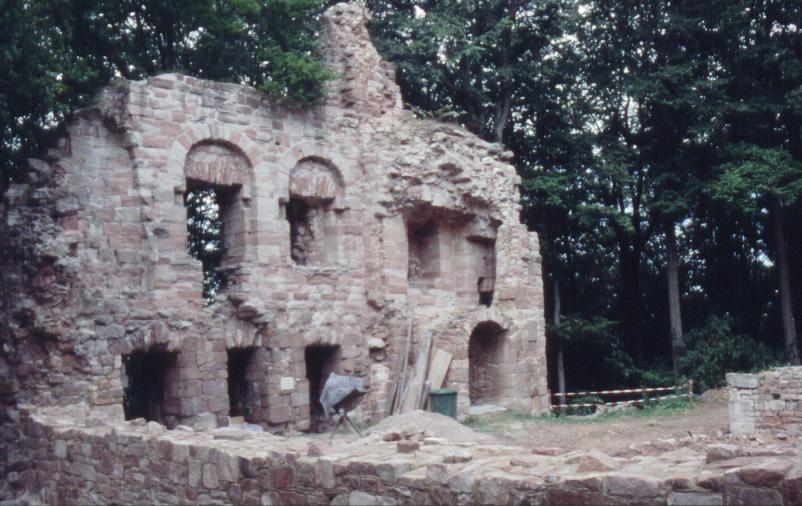
The north wall of the ruin

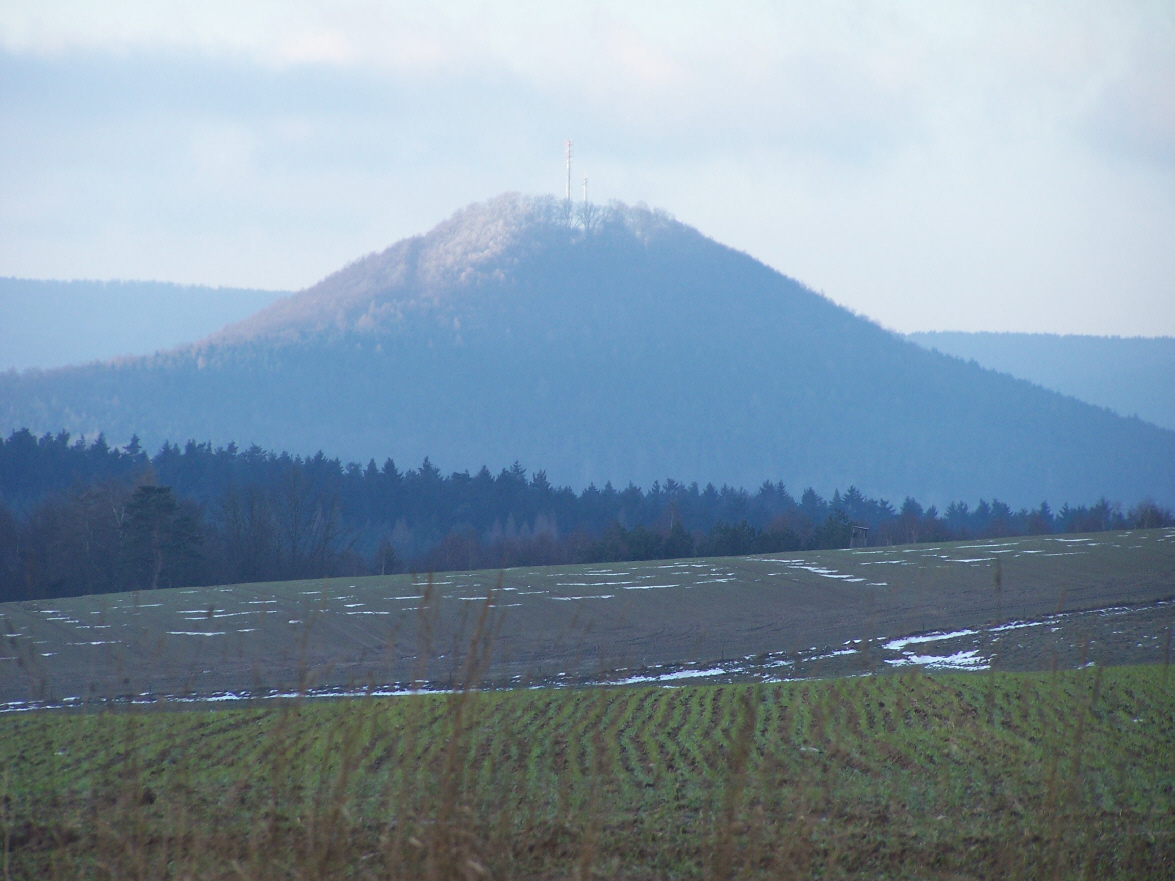
The Krayenberg from the north

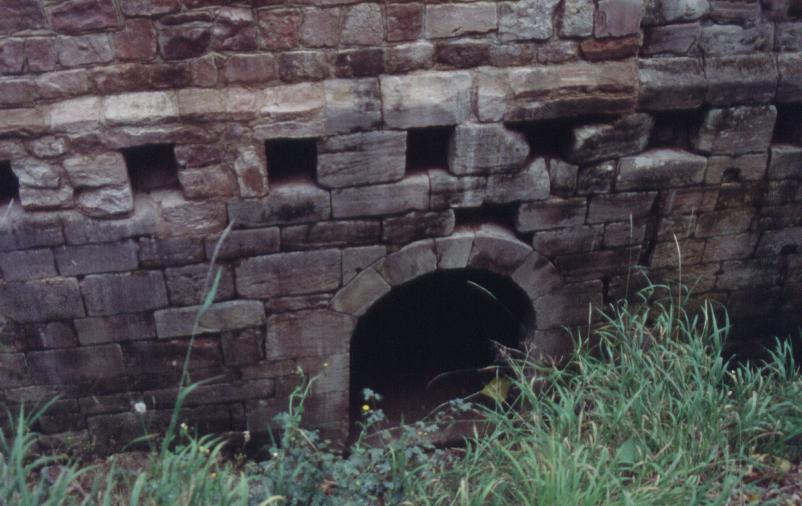
The Kellergeschoss

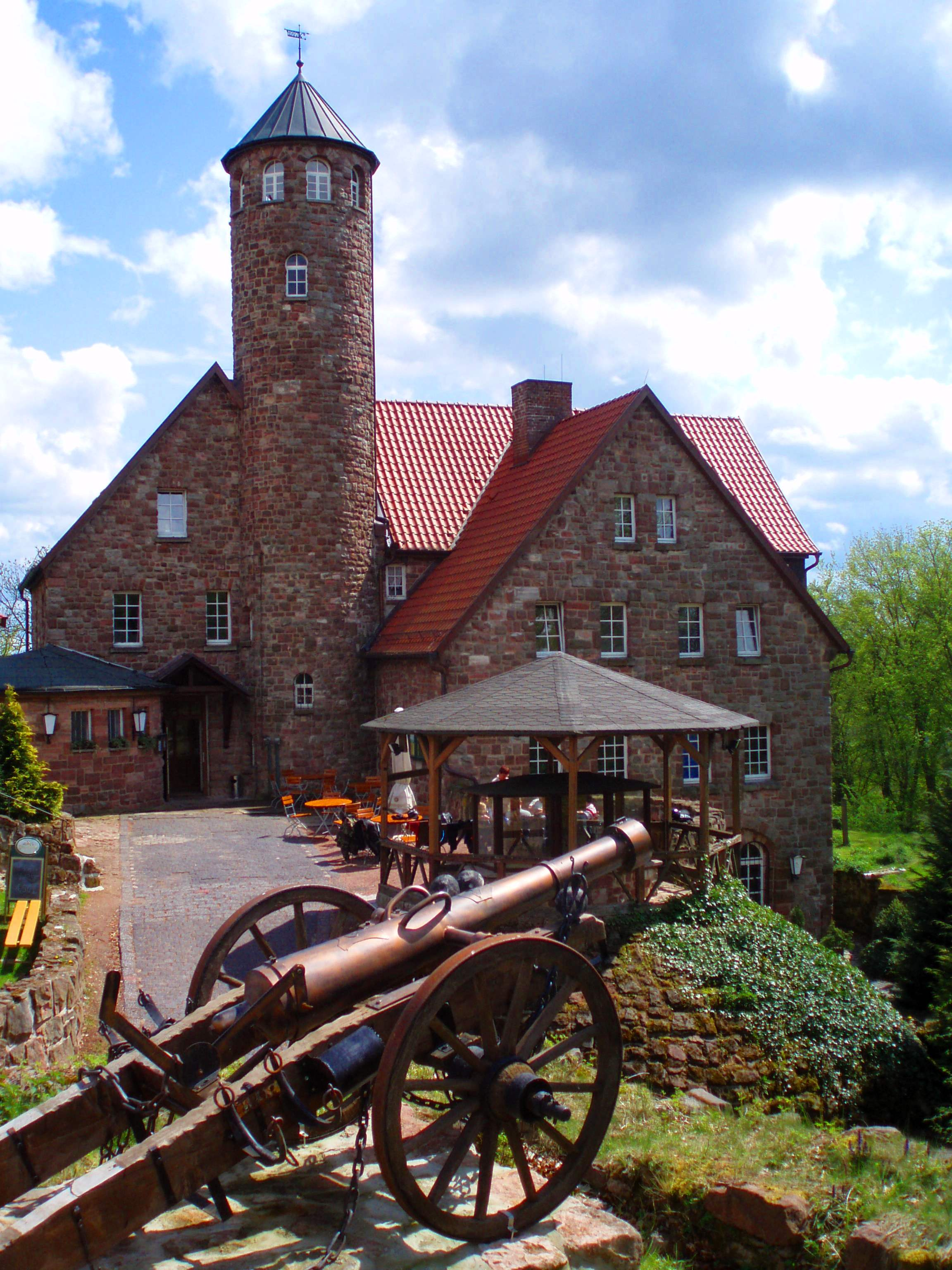
Hotel Krayenburg

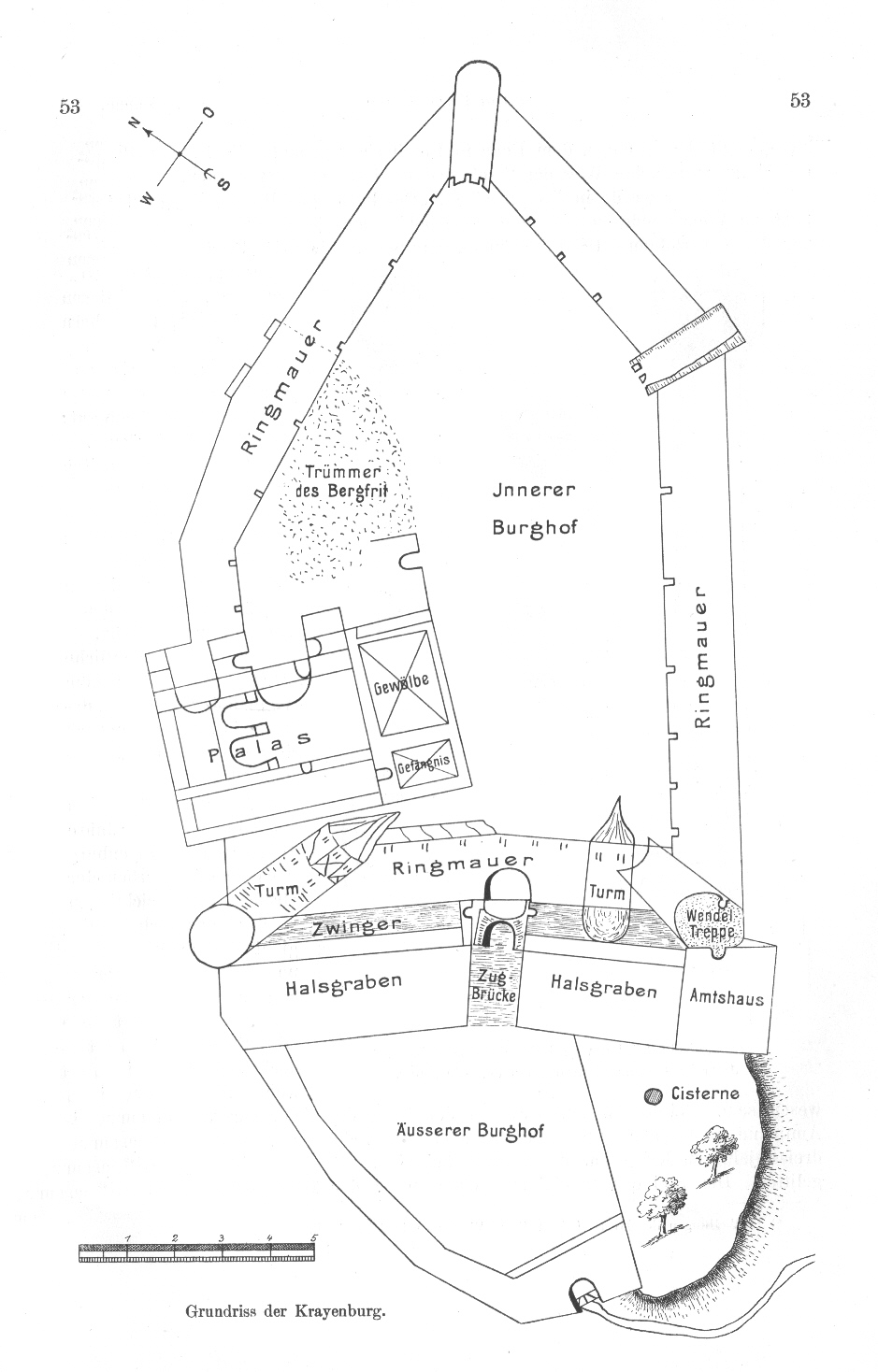
Historical plan

The Krayenburg was a castle situated on the Krayenberg hill in Germany, having the townships of Tiefenort and Merkers-Kieselbach at its foot, and overlooking an extensive section of the Werratal.

On 31 August 786 Charlemagne gave the village of Dorndorf and all of its belongings to Hersfeld Abbey; the abbey built the Krayenburg to protect it. The castle changed ownership repeatedly. It was owned by Graf Adam von Beichlingen, who died on 7 August 1538 and is buried in the church in Tiefenort. The Thirty Years' War started the destruction of the castle when Croatian troops (under Johann Ludwig Hektor von Isolani) captured the Krayenburg. However, it continued to play an important role in German history until the 19th century. Johann Wolfgang von Goethe visited the castle in 1782, the year he was ennobled.

The castle was originally very large, once larger than Wartburg Castle. The ruins have been restored and are open to visitors; there is a restaurant with hotel on the former site. A tower allows a wide view into the Werratal.
