= Franz Oppenheimer (art collector) =

German businessman and art collector

Franz Oppenheimer (1 August 1871 – 26 April 1950) was a German businessman and art collector who assembled a large and significant collection of early 18th century Meissen porcelain at his home in Berlin, Germany.

== Career ==
Franz Oppenheimer was born the son of Ruben Leopold Oppenheimer and Rebecka Loeb in Hamburg on 1 August 1871. After qualifying as a lawyer, he joined Emanuel Friedlaender & Co, a business operating coal mines in Silesia, and rose to be managing director.

In the 1920s, Oppenheimer assembled a collection of around 500 items of Meissen porcelain at his home near the Tiergarten in Berlin: some of the more important items had originally been commissioned by Augustus the Strong for display in the Japanisches Palais in Dresden.

After the Nazi Party came to power in Germany, Oppenheimer and his wife fled from Berlin to the comparative safety of Vienna in December 1936. Just before the Anschluss in March 1938, they travelled to Budapest and on, via Sweden and Columbia, to New York where they arrived in December 1941. Oppenheimer lived in retirement in an apartment in East 86th Street and died in New York on 26 April 1950.

== The Oppenheimer collection ==
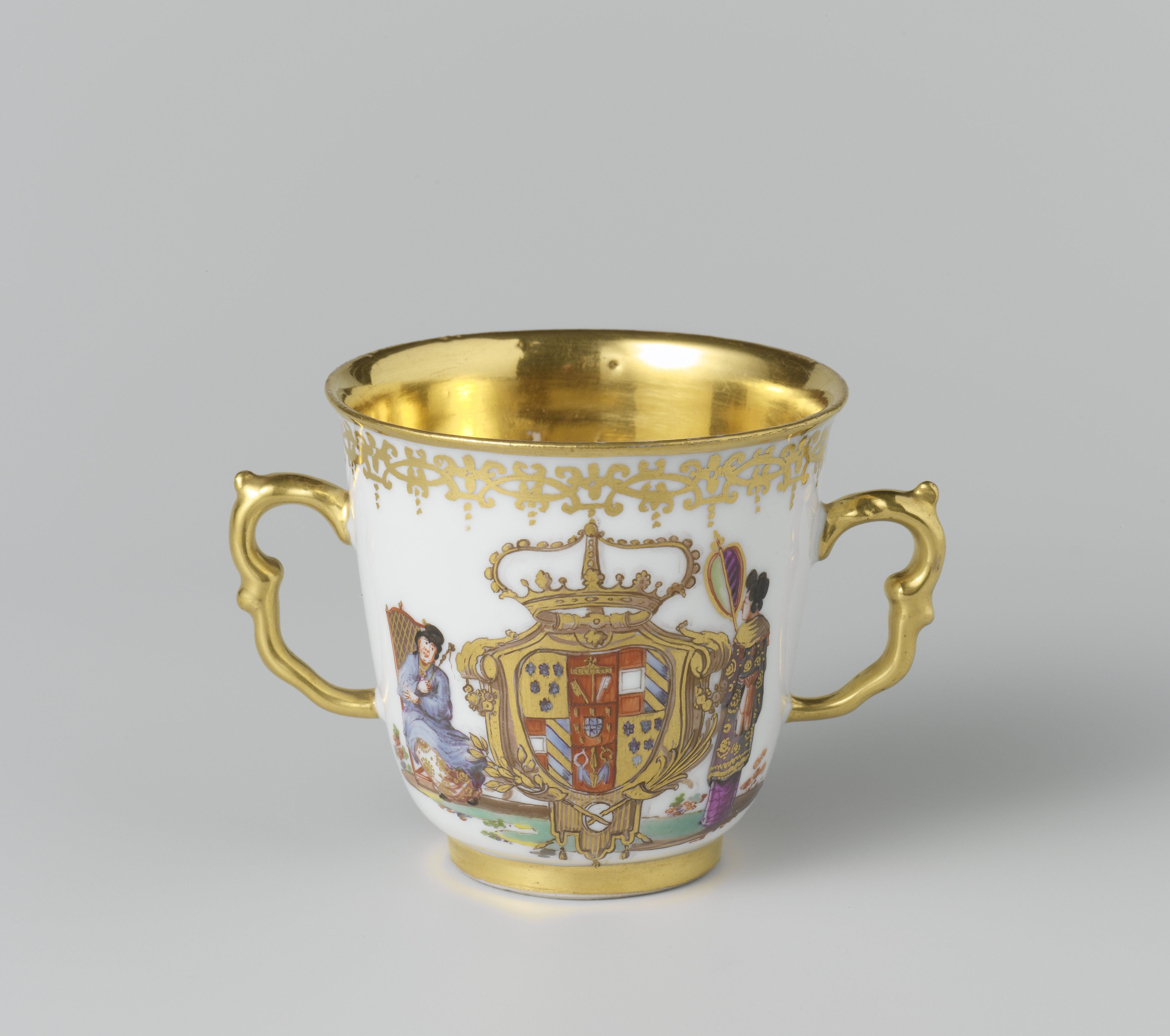
A chocolate drinking cup made in 1730 which once formed part of the Oppenheimer collection

Oppenheimer's collection of around 500 items of Meissen Porcelain was professionally catalogued in 1927. After Oppenheimer and his wife fled Berlin in December 1936, a significant part of the collection was acquired by the banker and art collector, Fritz Mannheimer. Following Mannheimer's death in August 1939, his bank, Mendelssohn & Co., immediately ceased trading and the personal assets of Mannheimer and those of Mendelssohn & Co. were liquidated. The collection was then expropriated by Kajetan Mühlmann on behalf of the Nazi Government for display in the proposed Führermuseum. It was then taken to Vyšší Brod Monastery and, from there, to storage in an underground salt mine near Bad Aussee.

After the Second World War, the collection was recovered by the so-called Monuments Men and taken to the Munich Central Collecting Point from where it was sent to the Netherlands where it was dispersed between the Rijksmuseum in Amsterdam, the Kunstmuseum in The Hague and the Museum Boijmans Van Beuningen in Rotterdam. In October 2019, the Dutch Restitution Commission recommended that the collection be restituted to the heirs of Franz and Margarete Oppenheimer and a group of 117 chinoiserie items, including a large mantel clock case made for Augustus the Strong and dated 1727 was auctioned, on their behalf, by Sotheby's in New York in September 2021.

One art expert, Alfredo Reyes, claimed that the auction of the Oppenheimer Collection was the most significant sale of a porcelain collection since the sale of Maurice de Rothschild's collection at Christie's in the late 1970s. The auction raised US$ 15 million and more than half of the items were bought back by the Rijksmuseum.

== Family ==
Oppenheimer married Margarete Grete Knapp on 27 March 1902; they had two children, Marie Louise and Franz Karl.
