= Krayenberggemeinde =

- Municipality
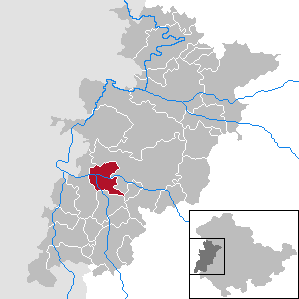
- Location of Krayenberggemeinde within Wartburgkreis district
- Interactive map of Krayenberggemeinde
- Location within Germany Location within Thuringia
- Coordinates: 50°50′N 10°6′E
- Country: Germany
- State: Thuringia
- District: Wartburgkreis

Government
  - Mayor (2020–26): Peter Neumann

Area
  - Total: 31.63 km^{2} (12.21 sq mi)
- Elevation: 250 m (820 ft)

Population (2025-12-31)
  - Total: 4,818
  - Density: 152.3/km^{2} (394.5/sq mi)
- Time zone: UTC+01:00 (CET)
  - Summer (DST): UTC+02:00 (CEST)
- Postal codes: 36460
- Dialling codes: 036963
- Vehicle registration: WAK

Krayenberggemeinde (German pronunciation: [ˈkʁaɪənbɛʁkɡəˌmaɪndə], lit. 'Krayenberg Municipality') is a municipality in the Wartburgkreis district of Thuringia, Germany. It was named after the hill Krayenberg. It was formed on 31 December 2013 by the merger of the former municipalities Dorndorf and Merkers-Kieselbach.
