= William I of Hesse =

William I of Hesse may refer to:

- William I of Lower Hesse (1466–1515)
- William I, Elector of Hesse (1743–1821)
