= William I of Lower Hesse =

William I
- Landgrave of Lower Hesse
- Born: 4 July 1466
- Died: 8 February 1515 (aged 48); Kassel
- Spouse: Anna of Brunswick-Wolfenbüttel
- Issue: Mathilda; Mathilda; Anna; Katherine; Elisabeth
- House: House of Hesse
- Father: Louis II, Landgrave of Lower Hesse
- Mother: Mechthild of Württemberg-Urach

William I of Hesse (German: Wilhelm) (4 July 1466 – 8 February 1515) was the Landgrave of Hesse (Lower Hesse) from 1471 to 1493.

His parents were Louis the Frank (1438–1471) and Mechthild, daughter of Count Louis I of Württemberg. On 17 February 1488 in Münden, he married Anna of Brunswick-Wolfenbüttel c. 1460 - Worms 16 May 1520], daughter of William IV, Duke of Brunswick-Wolfenbüttel and Elisabeth, Countess of Stolberg, with whom he had five daughters:

- Mathilda, born in 1489 but died young.
- Mathilda (born 1490; died 6 May 1558), married in Korbach on 19 May 1527 Konrad, Count of Tecklenburg (born 1493; died 16 August 1557)
- Anna (born 1491; died 1513), a nun
- Katherine (died 1525), married in 1511 Adam Count von Beichlingen (died Krayenberg 14 July 1538)
- Elisabeth [10 September 1503 - Lauingen 4 January 1563], first married in Meisenheim on 16 October 1525 to Louis II, Count Palatine of Zweibrücken (born 1502; died 1532), later married on 9 January 1541 George, Count Palatine of Simmern (born 1518; died 1569).

After a pilgrimage to the Holy Land in 1491 where he was dubbed a Knight of the Holy Sepulchre, he probably contracted syphilis. He abdicated in favor of his brother William II on 3 June 1493, and spent the rest of his life in Spangenberg.

== Literature ==
- Phillip Landgrebe: Der Reisebericht Dietrichs von Schachten. In: Zeitschrift für hessische Geschichte und Landeskunde (ZHG), Bd. 123 (2018), p. 177–198 (See the third chapter about the pilgrimage of Wilhelm I.: p. 185–191).

Preceded by Louis II	Landgrave of Lower Hesse; 1471–1493	Succeeded by William II
