= Nazi storage sites for art during World War II =

The German Nazi Party stored art, gold and other objects that had been either plundered or moved for safekeeping during World War II at various storage sites. These sites included salt mines at Altaussee and Merkers and a copper mine at Siegen.

== Altaussee salt mine ==
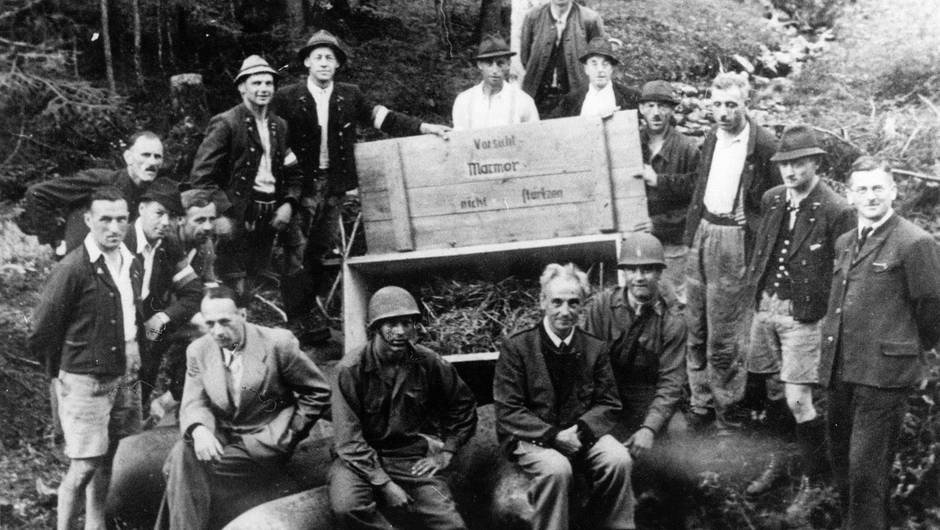
Altaussee, May 1945 after the removal of the eight 500 kg bombs at the Nazi stolen art repository.

Between 1943 and 1945, the extensive complex of salt mines in Altaussee served as a huge repository for art stolen by the Nazis. It also contained holdings from Austrian collections. Initially, in August 1943, art treasures from Austrian churches, monasteries and museums were transferred into the mines for safekeeping, followed by, starting in February 1944, a stock of about 4,700 works of stolen art from all over Europe. These artworks were accumulated under the alias Sonderauftrag Linz (Special Commission: Linz) by Adolf Hitler and were intended for the planned Führermuseum in Linz, Austria. At the end of the war the entire depot stored 6,577 paintings, 137 sculptures, and 484 crates of other art, as well as furniture, weapons, coins, and library collections, including some of Adolf Hitler's so-called Führerbibliothek (Führer's library).

The contents of the repository included Belgian-owned treasures such as Michelangelo's Madonna of Bruges stolen from the Church of Our Lady in Bruges and Jan van Eyck’s Ghent Altarpiece stolen from Saint Bavo Cathedral in Ghent, Vermeer’s The Astronomer and The Art of Painting, which were to be focal points of Hitler’s Führermuseum in Linz, and paintings from the Capodimonte Museum in Naples, Italy that had been stolen by the Hermann Göring Tank Division (Fallschirm-Panzer Division 1 Hermann Göring) at Monte Cassino in Italy.

In April 1945, as the Allied troops approached the salt mine, Gauleiter August Eigruber gave orders to blow it up. For this intention he had eight bombs with 500 kg each transported into the tunnels. Hitler countermanded Eigruber's order, but after the Führer's death the Gauleiter ignored this. Nevertheless, his order was not carried out. The destruction was prevented at the last minute by the local mine administration, the repository officers and the miners. On the night of 3–4 May 1945 it was possible to remove the embedded bombs from the mine. To bluff Gauleiter Eigruber and to prevent further access to the treasures the major entrances into the mine were blown up. After the occupation of Altaussee on 8 May 1945 by an American infantry unit, the art depot was seized by the U.S. Army (Monuments Men). The entrances were opened again and the rescue work began. The artworks were brought to the Central Art Collecting Point in Munich in the following years, where the difficult process of restitution began, which is still going on today.

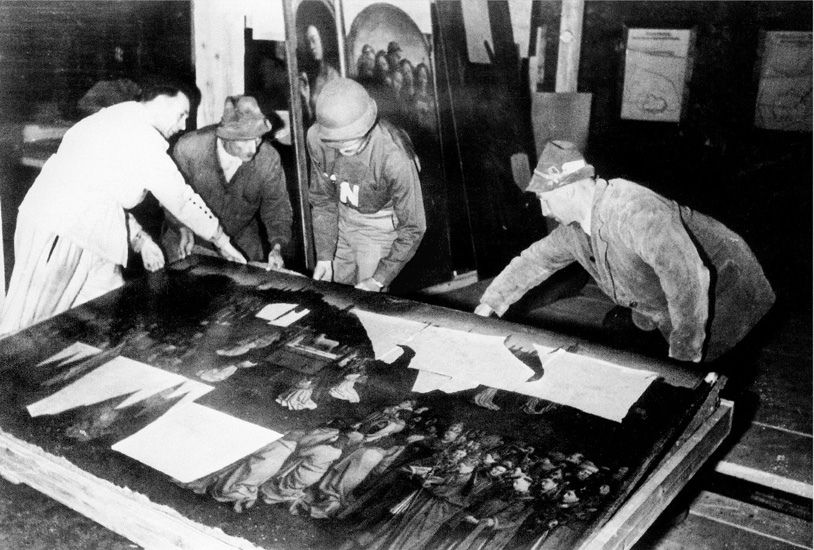

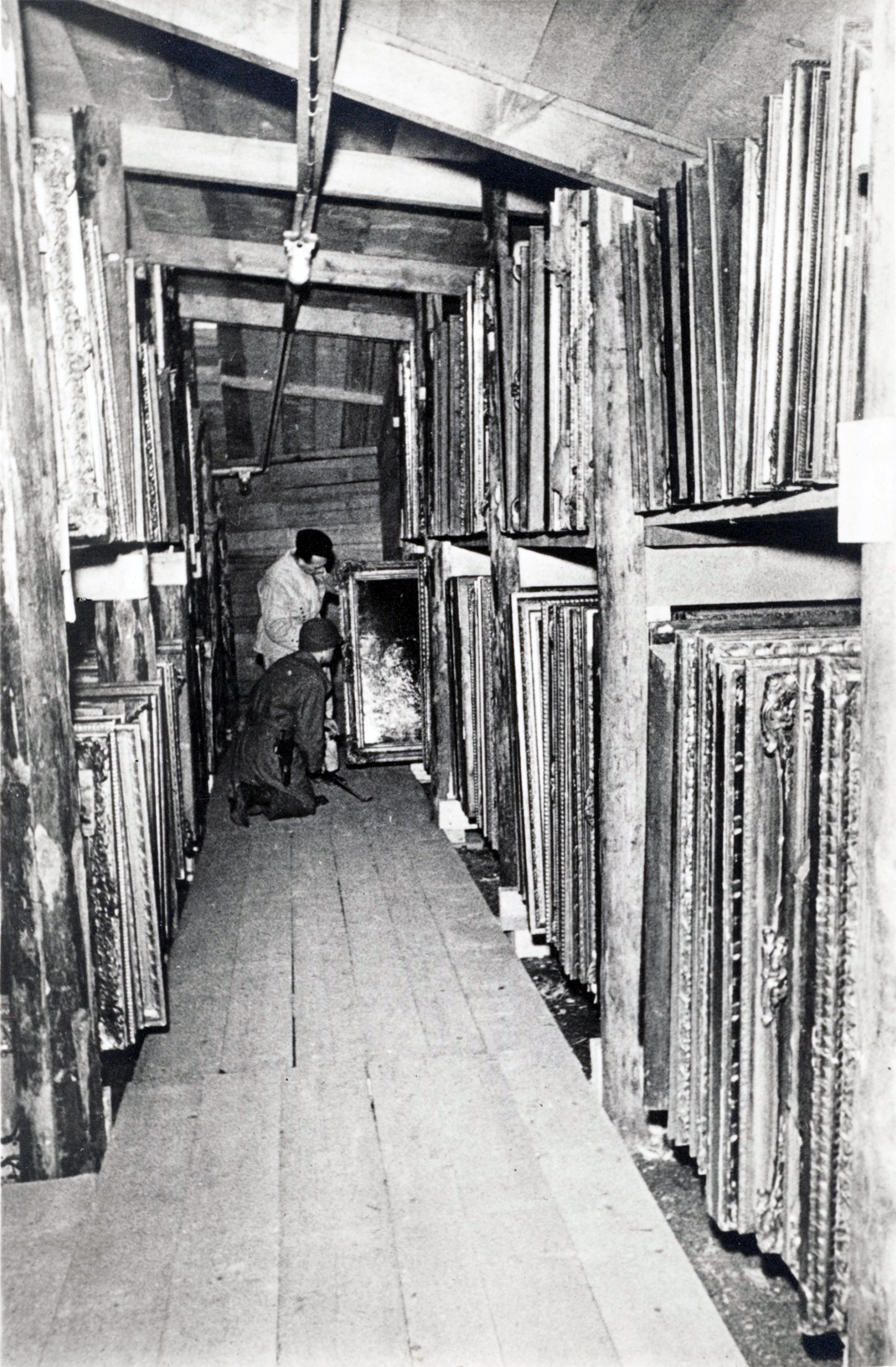

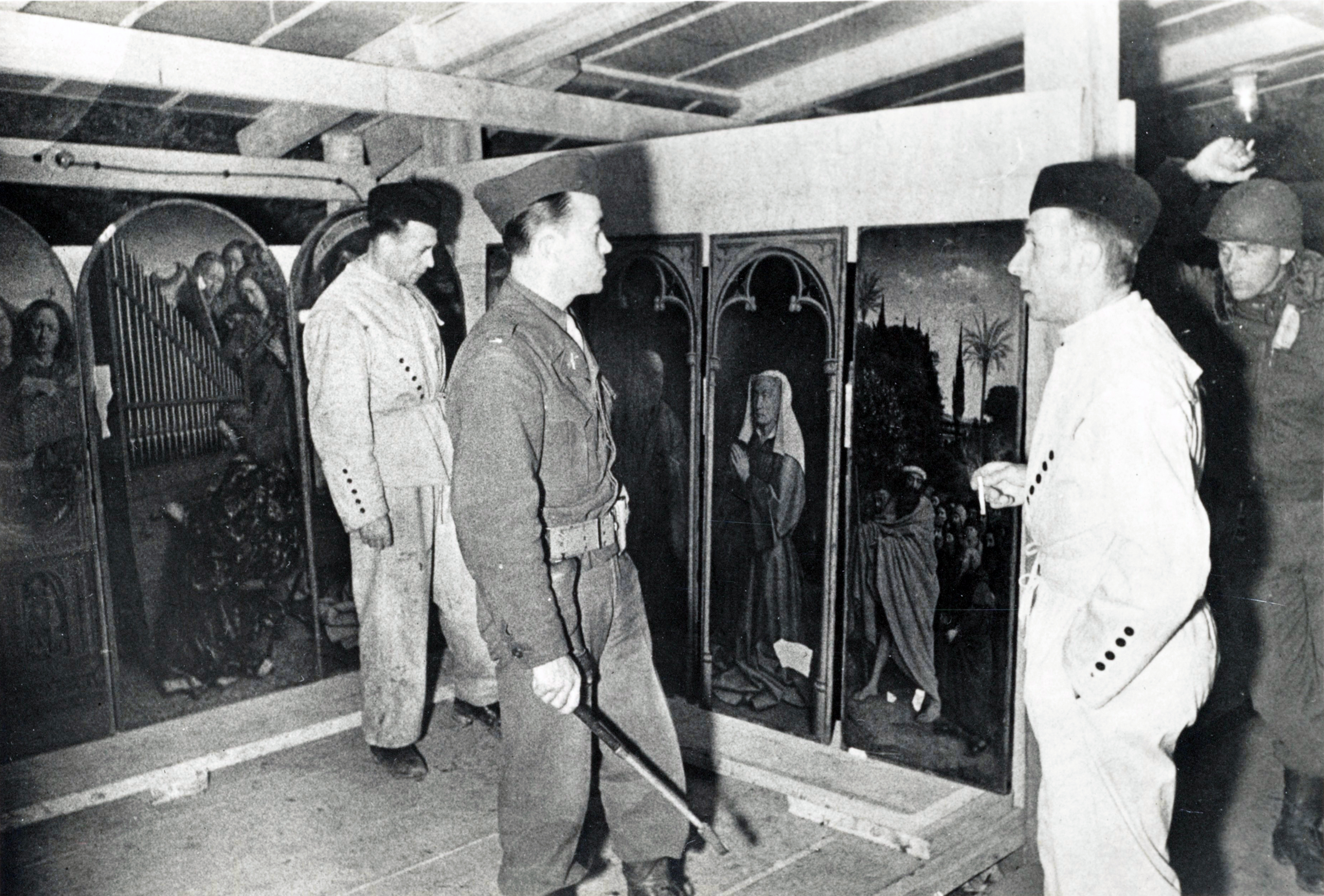

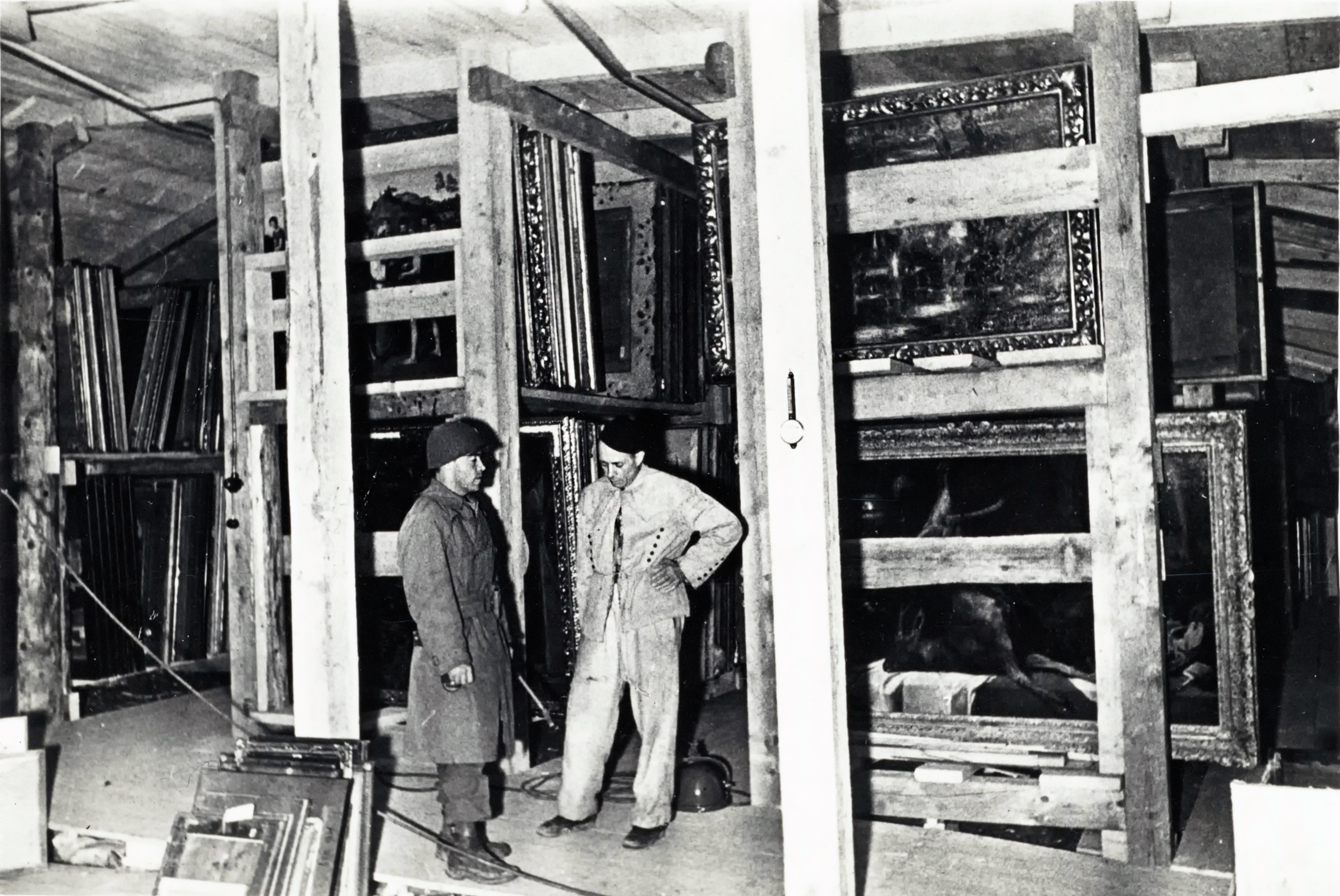

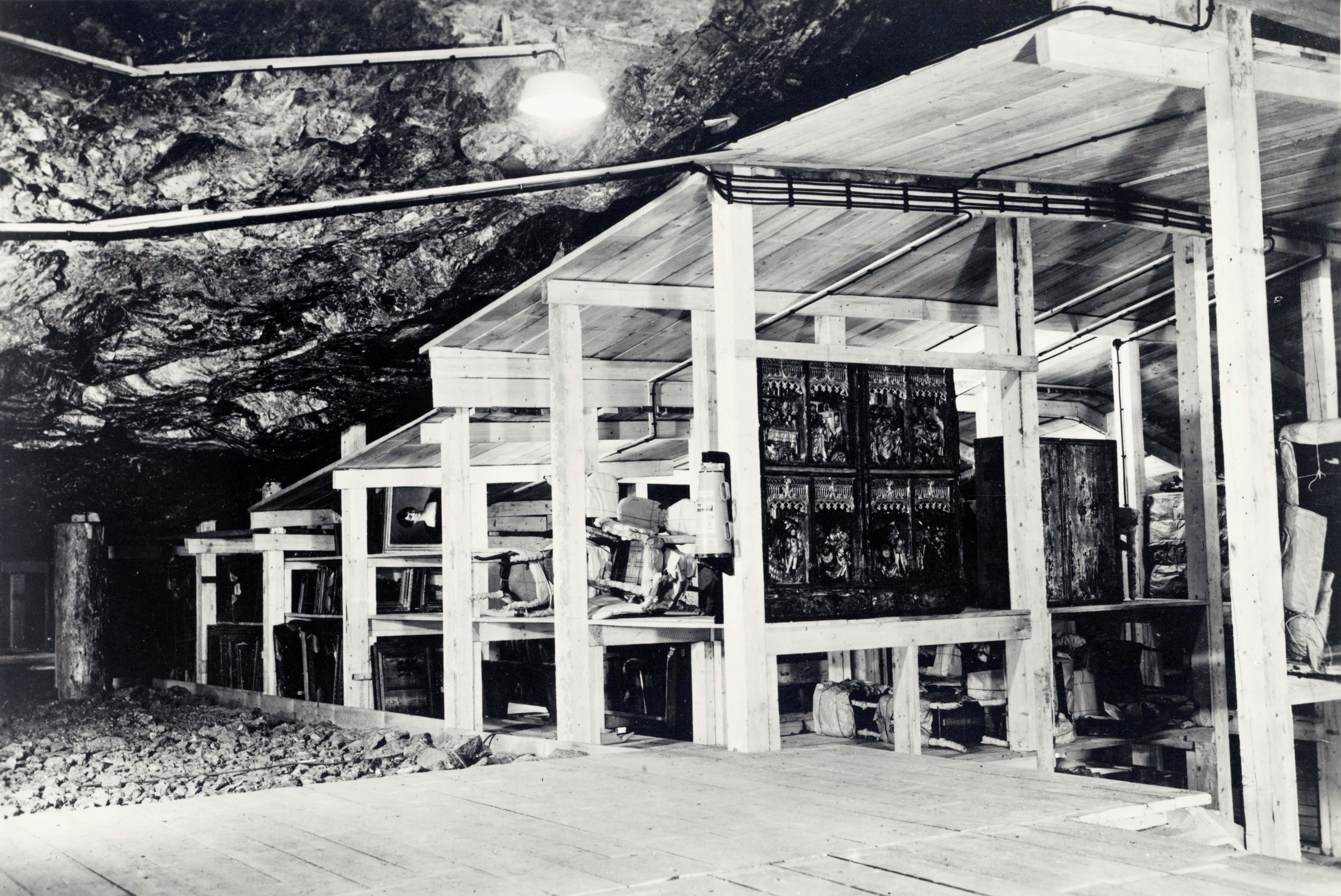

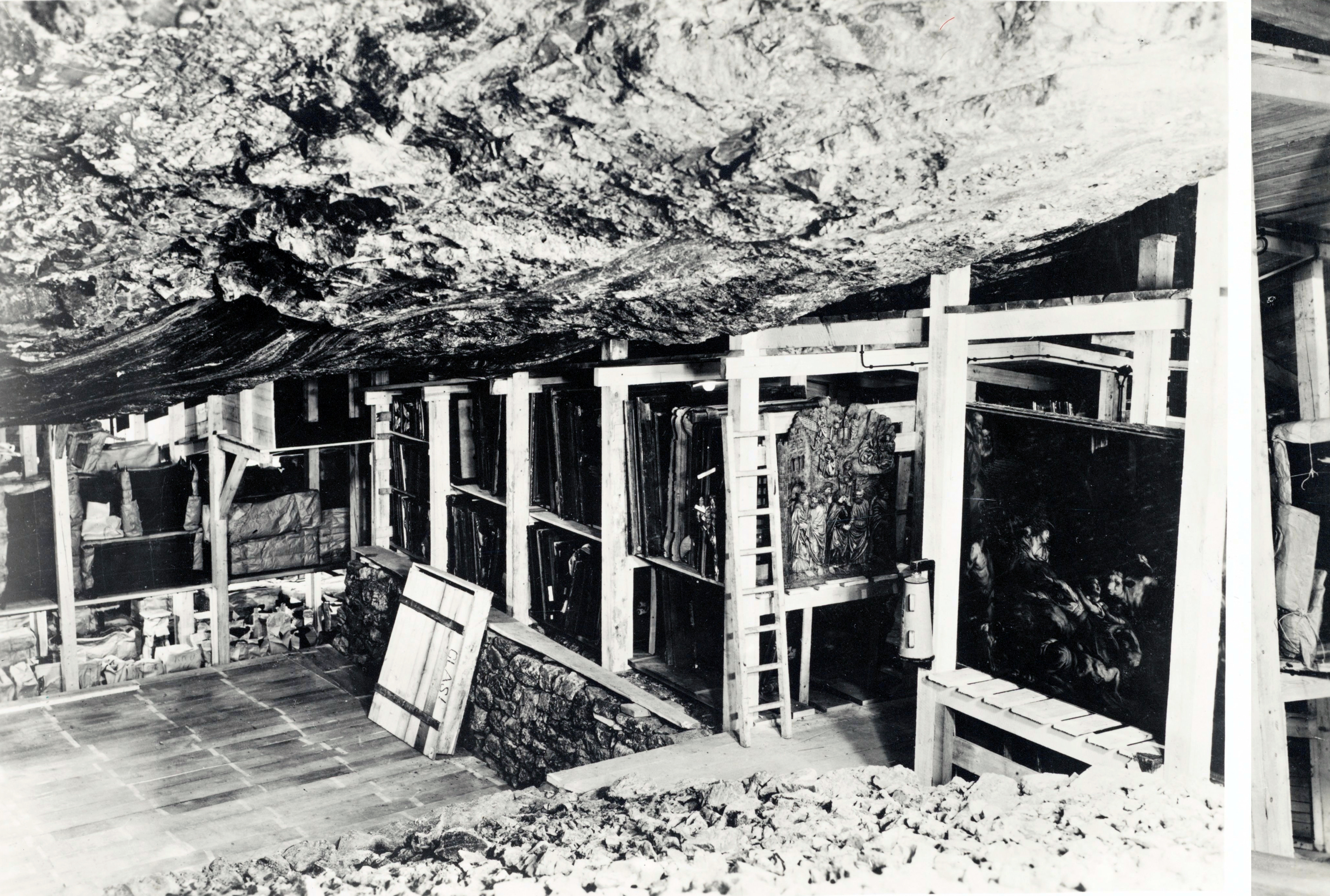

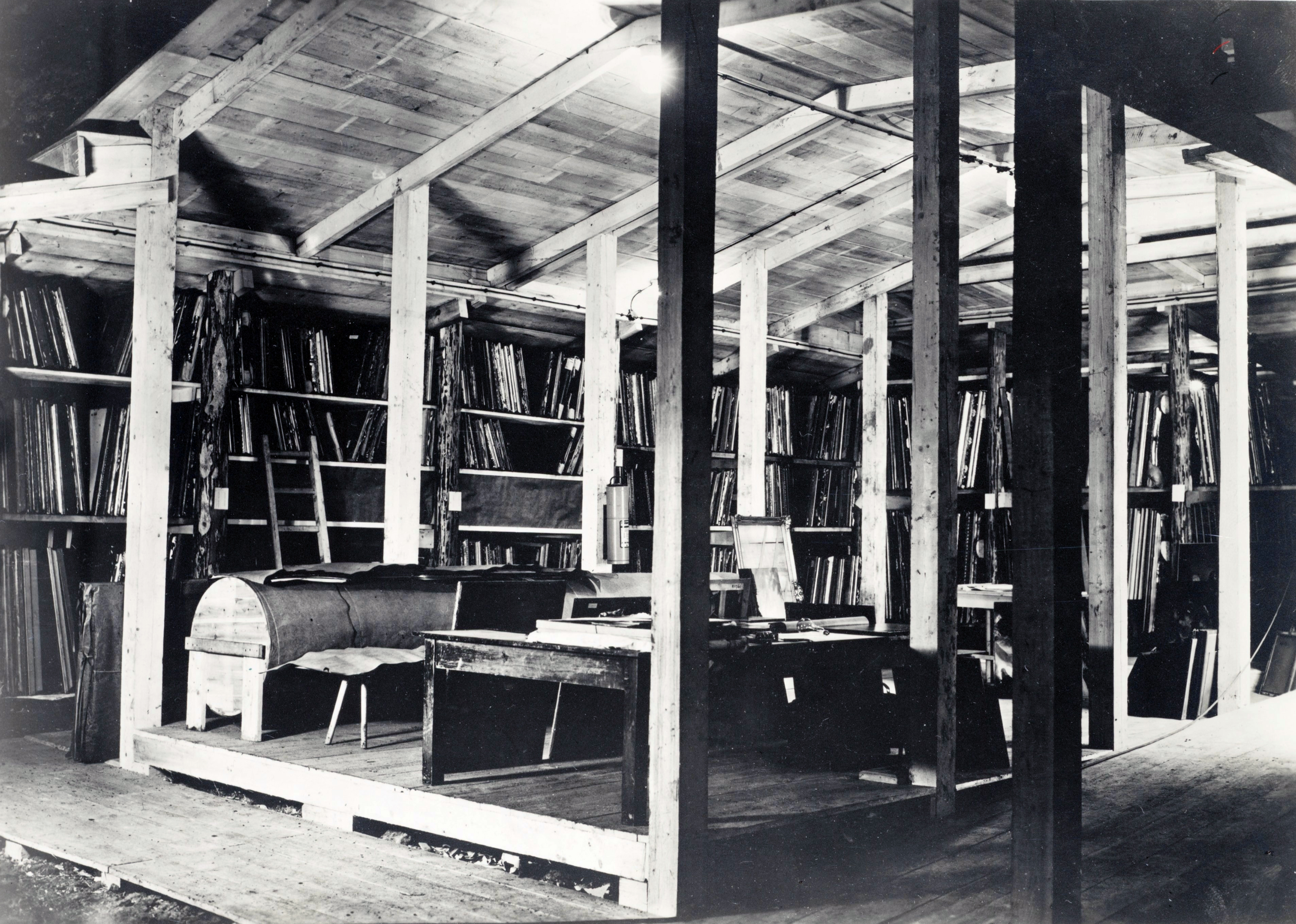

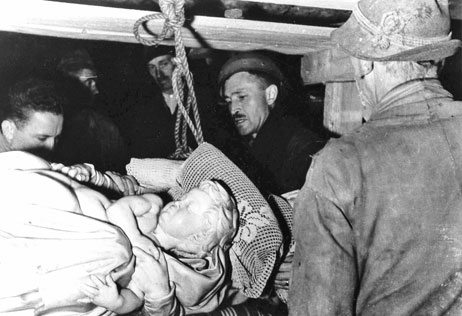
The Madonna of Bruges being recovered from the Altaussee salt mine

== Merkers salt mine ==
The Kaiseroda salt mine complex near Merkers stored over 400 million Reichsmarks worth of Nazi gold (equivalent to 2 billion 2021 €), thousands of crates of artworks that had been transferred from the Berlin State Museums for safekeeping, and many stolen works of art.

On April 4, 1945, the 90th Infantry Division of the US Army captured the town of Merkers. Two days later, some military policemen encountered two local women who they escorted into town. The citizens commented on the use of the mine as they passed by it, and the story was soon confirmed. One entrance to the mine was already under guard, but there were four more, all of which were ordered guarded. Inside, US officials found 30 miles of galleries, and bags containing almost half a billion Reichsmarks at the main entrance. The gold was protected by a vault, which was eventually blasted. Inside was a room 75 x 150 feet containing 7,000 numbered bags of gold bar and coins, 250 tons in all. The vault stored currencies from across Europe, including 2.7 billion Reichsmarks and 98 million French francs (equivalent to 11 billion 2021 €). In other areas were 400 tons of artwork, and hundreds of tons of patent and other records, ammunition, library holdings (2 million books), and valises containing the confiscated valuables of the Third Reich's victims. By April 16 the US began moving the gold and currency to a Reichsbank building in Frankfurt, with a convoy of 30 overloaded ten-ton trucks under heavy protection, including air support. This procedure was repeated for the artwork. General Dwight D. Eisenhower visited the mine sometime in April to examine the find.

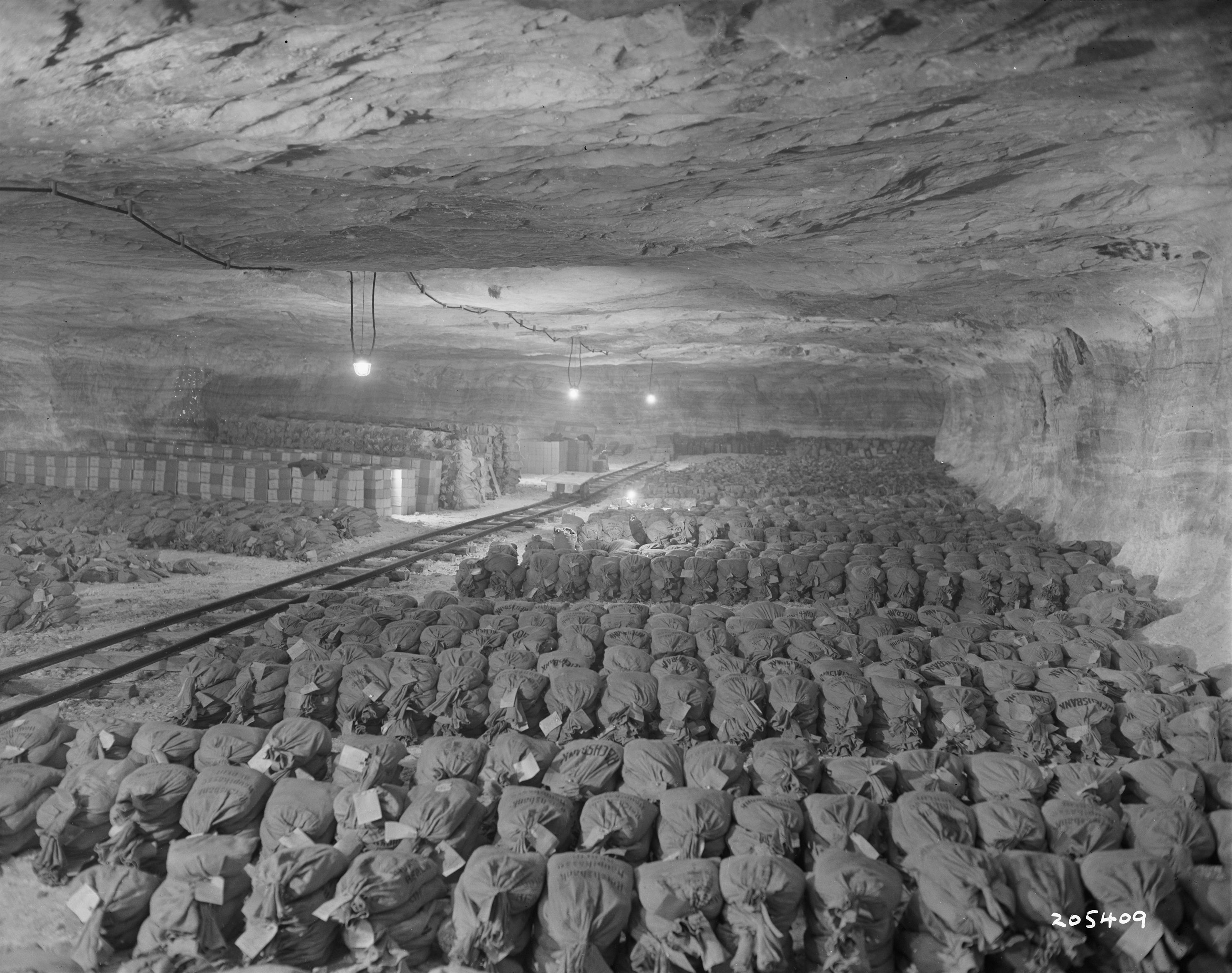
Nazi gold in the Merkers salt mine

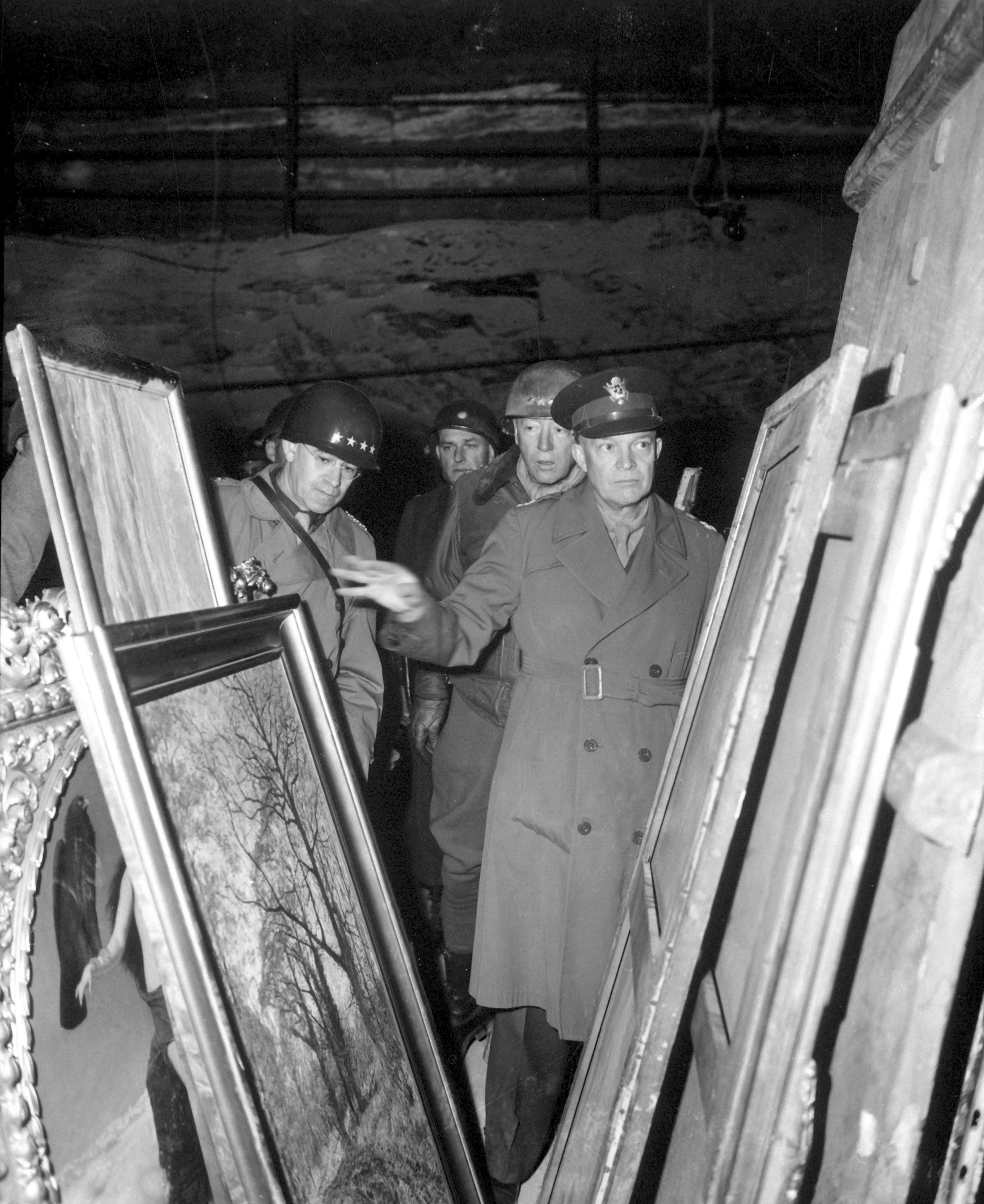
Eisenhower inspects stolen artwork

== Siegen mine ==
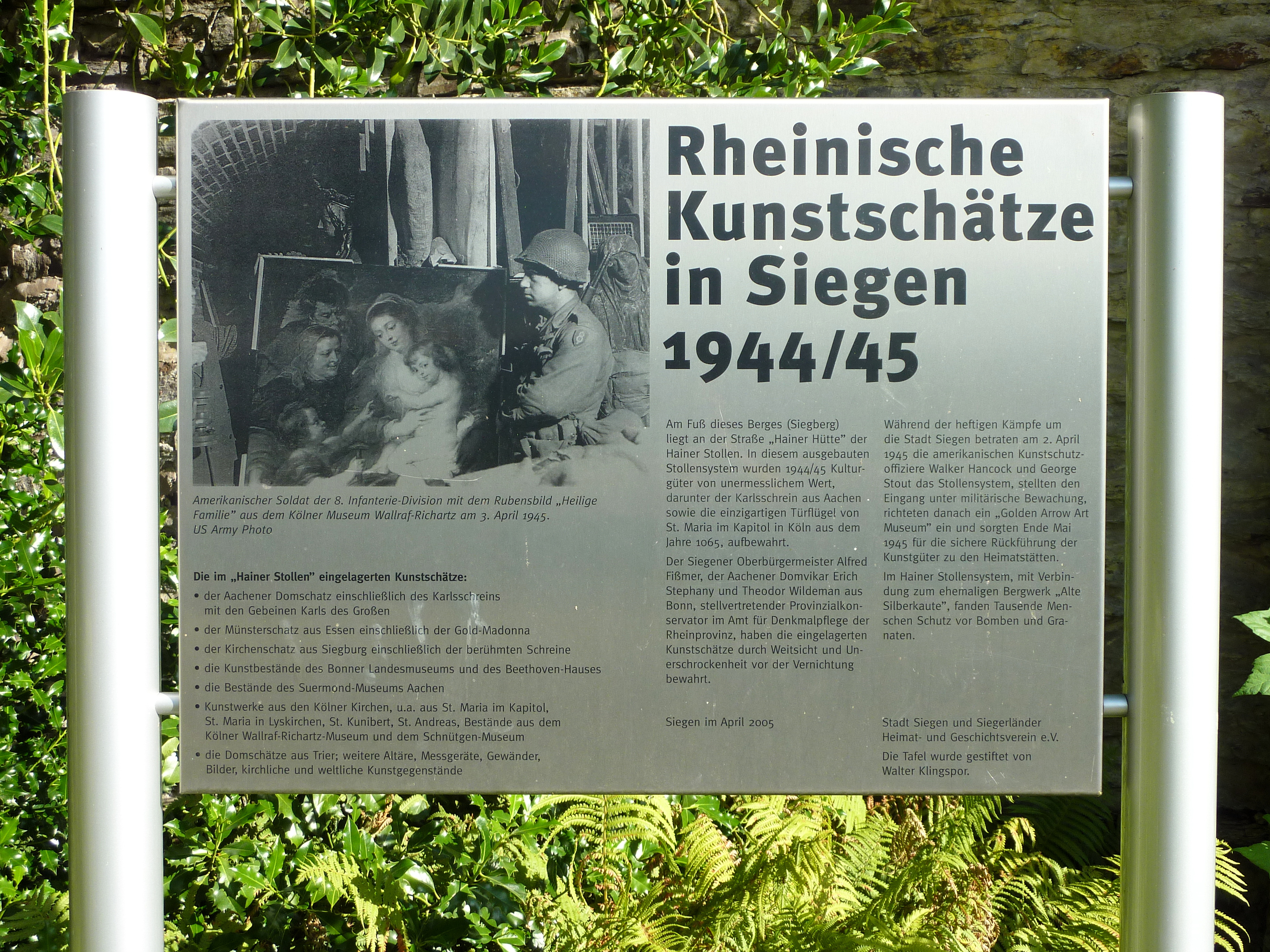
Sign at the site of the Hainer Stollen in Siegen

The Siegen mine (Hainer Stollen aka. Alte Silberkaute) contained a large cache of art and artifacts. They included the relics of Charlemagne from Aachen Cathedral, as well as paintings, sculpture, manuscripts, and other objects from German museums.

== Other sites ==
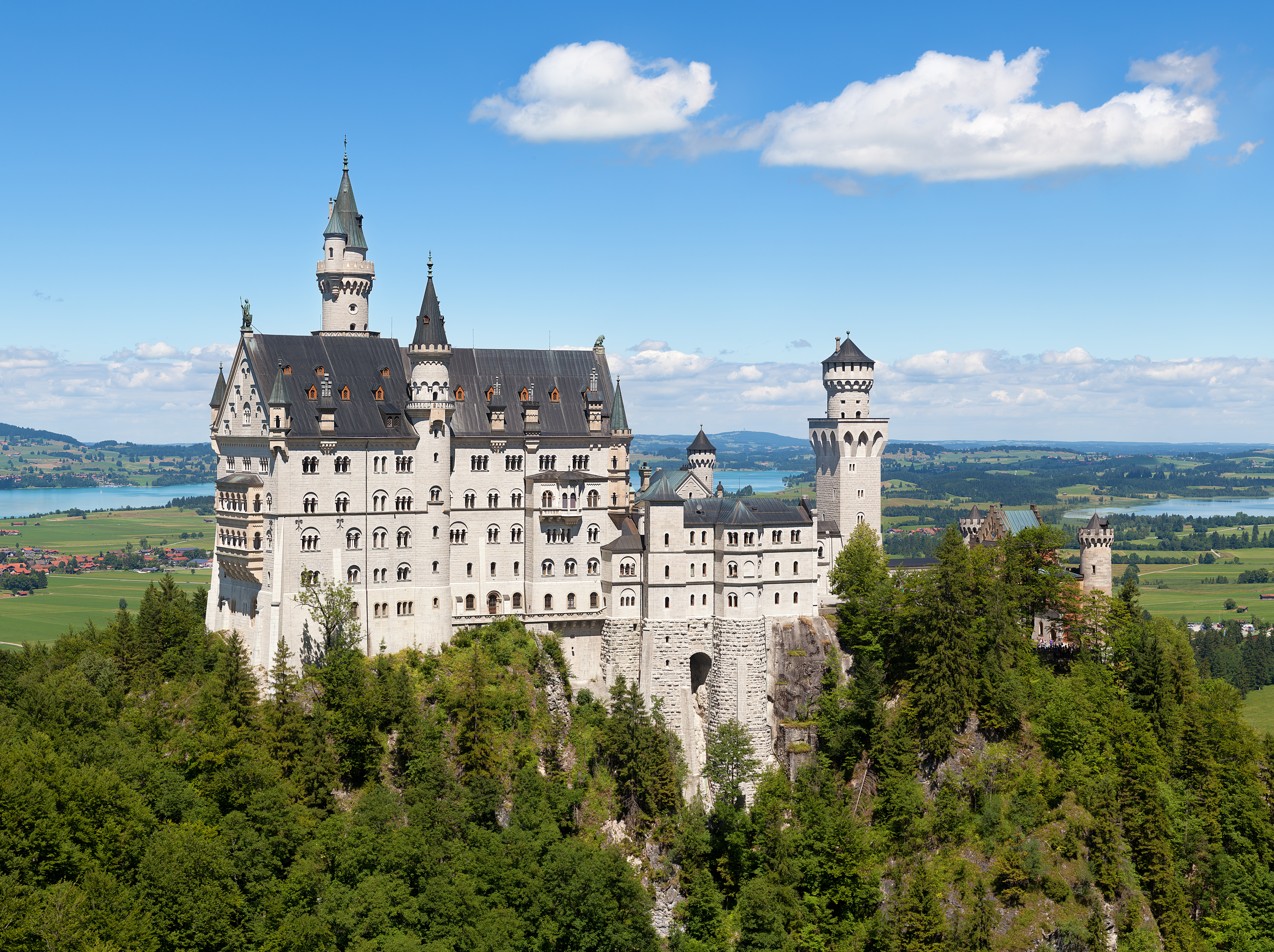
Neuschwanstein Castle where many plundered art works were stored by the Nazis during World War II.

The Neuschwanstein Castle in Bavaria was used to store many artworks on the assumption that it was unlikely to sustain damage in war. It housed art confiscated from Parisian Jews—more than 21,000 objects—and about 2,000 works from the Bavarian State Painting Collections.

The collection of the Kaiser-Friedrich Museum (now the Kulturhistorisches Museum Magdeburg) was transported to a salt mine in the nearby town of Stassfurt, in order to protect it from Allied bombing. Later, in April 1945, fires broke out at the mine after American forces reached the site. While reports by Monuments Men noted that the contents of the mine had been "entirely reduced to ashes", part of the collection was recovered after the war.

== Notable artworks recovered ==
- Michelangelo, Madonna of Bruges, Altaussee
- van Eyck, Ghent Altarpiece, Altaussee
- Vermeer, The Art of Painting, Altaussee
- Manet, In the Conservatory, Merkers
