= Krayenberg =

Hill near Tiefenort, Germany

Coordinates: 50°50′15.56″N 10°7′47.21″E

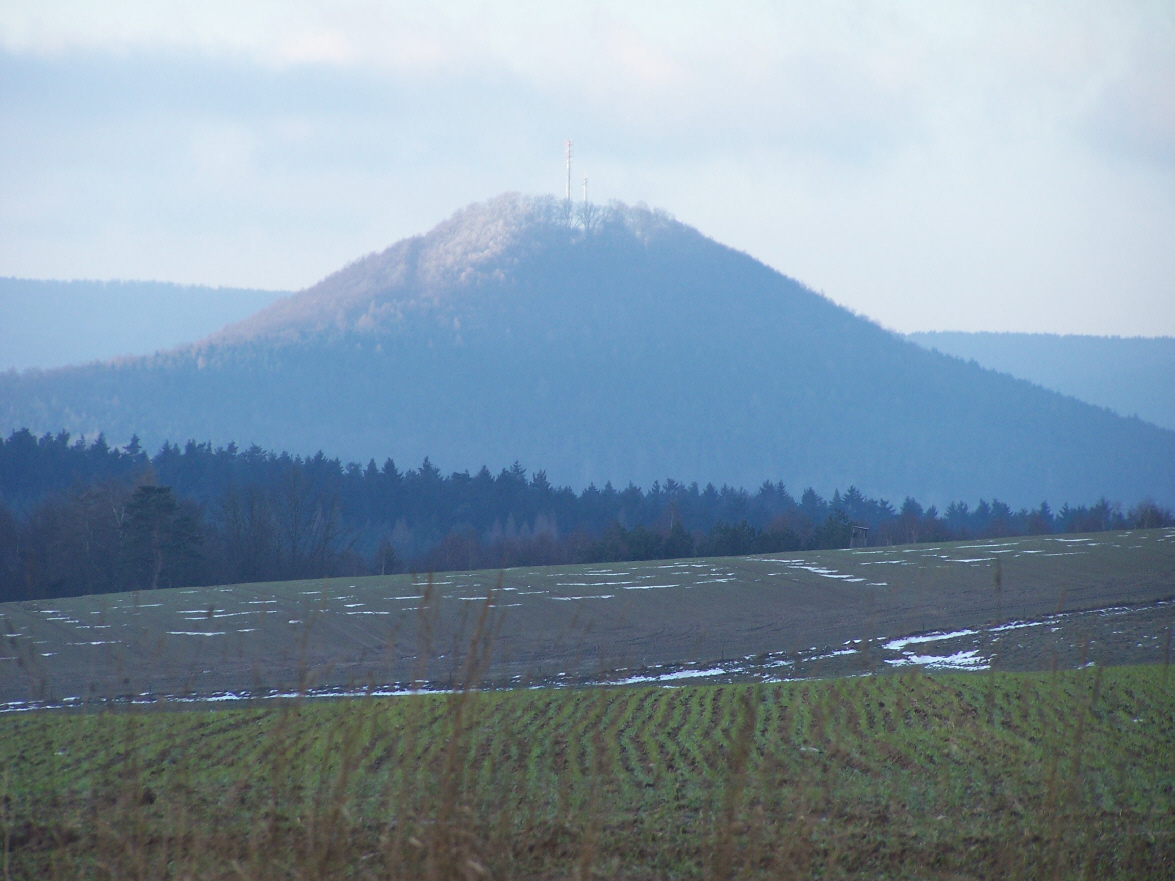
The Krayenberg from the north

The Krayenberg (German pronunciation: [ˈkʁaɪənˌbɛʁk]) is a 431-metre (1,414 ft) hill near Tiefenort, Germany. Since 500 BCE it was a rampart and served as a refuge for the central part of the Werratal. It became important for German history due to the Krayenburg, which was built on its top after 786, and destroyed starting with the Thirty Years' War. Today, the well-maintained ruins, a restaurant and a hotel define a tourist location in the Werratal.
