= In the Conservatory =

Painting by Édouard Manet

- Artist: Édouard Manet
- Year: 1878–1879
- Medium: Oil on canvas
- Dimensions: 115 cm × 150 cm (45.3 in × 59.1 in)
- Location: Alte Nationalgalerie; Berlin

In the Conservatory (French: Dans la serre) is an 1879 oil painting by Édouard Manet in the Alte Nationalgalerie, Berlin, depicting Manet's friends, a couple, in a conservatory. There is an ambiguity in the painting that has led art critics to characterize the couple's relationship in divergent ways.

== Description ==
The setting is a conservatory at 70 Rue d'Amsterdam in Paris, then owned by painter Georg von Rosen and which Manet used as a studio for nine months in 1878 and 1879. Such a conservatory may have been more than a greenhouse; French painter Alix-Louise Enault's Consolation depicted the Parisian conservatory as a "luxuriously decorated and intimate locale—a secluded indoor area conducive to private rendezvous". At first glance, we see a double portrait of a fashionable and attractive couple of some social rank. They are Manet's friends, the Guillemets, who owned a clothing shop. Their married status is conveyed by their rings, and the proximity of their hands is the nearest hint of intimacy. The woman becomes the focus of the portrait, however, being more prominently placed and colourfully dressed. Their physical separation—with the husband Jules slouching in dark clothing behind the bench—their lack of engagement with the viewer, and their abstract gazes create a sense of detachment, which has been the primary theme in modern criticism of the work.

The interplay of lines formally defines the work. The woman has an erect posture echoed by the vertical slats of the bench, and the man, though leaning forward, does not break that vertical. The bench continues off the right side, reinforcing the horizontal and the separation of foreground and background. The diagonal pleats on the woman's dress provide some relief from the linearity of the composition.

Since the painting's exhibition, critics have interpreted the couple's relationship diversely. Huysmans called the subjects "marvelously detached from the envelope of green surrounding them". As Collins summarizes:

John Richardson, for example, called the figures 'stiff,' whereas the critic Castagnary, a contemporary of Manet's, wrote that 'nothing [could be] more natural than the attitudes.' The critic Banville has M. Guillemet staring at the rich moire silk of his wife's skirt; Duret has him chatting with her. Huysmans described Mme Guillemet as a 'lively flirt,' whereas another critic called her 'sulky.' George Heard Hamilton referred to a 'strange tension' reminiscent of The Balcony. And, finally, in Art Forum a feminist art critic has discovered in Mme Guillemet's 'positively recalcitrant' independence from her husband a 'radicalized female imagery.'

The painting was exhibited in the 1879 Paris Salon and was regarded as surprisingly conservative for Manet. Jules-Antoine Castagnary wrote, with tongue in cheek, "But what is this? Face and hands more carefully drawn than usual: is Manet making concessions to the public?"—and said it portrayed "the elegance of fashionable life".

Manet's Chez le Père Lathuille (see Gallery), having similar subjects and painted later in the same year, may be seen as a companion to In the Conservatory. It was not included in the 1879 Salon.

== Provenance ==
Jean-Baptiste Faure bought In the Conservatory from Manet, along with three other paintings, for the "paltry sum" of 11,000 francs. In 1896 the German Nationalgalerie in Berlin purchased it, becoming the first museum anywhere to have purchased a Manet.

In 1945 by the end of the Second World War In the Conservatory was among the objects evacuated from the German National Gallery and the Berlin State Museums and put for safekeeping in a mine in Merkers. After the war the picture was discovered and secured by the Monuments Men. Its salvage was documented in several photographs which show soldiers from the U.S. Army posing with Manet’s painting in the mine in Merkers. These photographs have gained iconographic status over the years and are often falsely used as an illustration of Nazi looted art in prestigious publications like the Deutsche Welle, The Washington Post, The New York Times and even in academic papers.

== Gallery ==
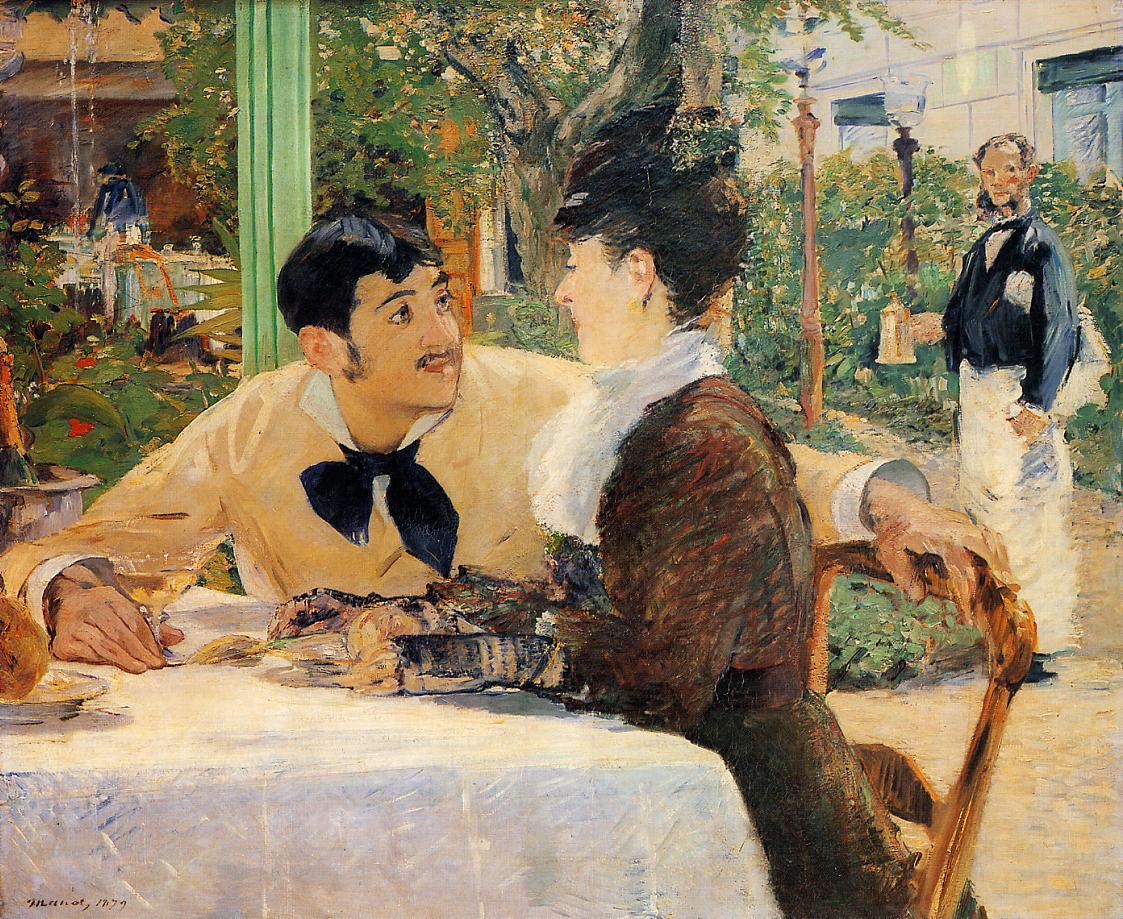
Manet, Chez le Père Lathuille (1879)

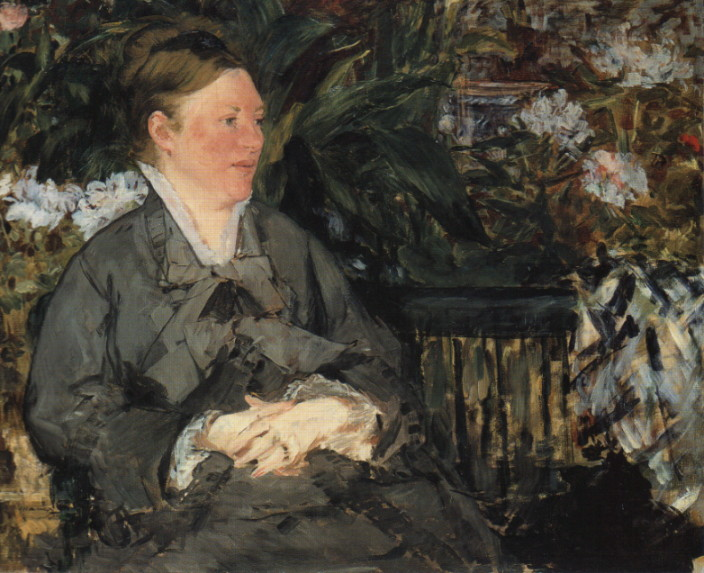
A portrait of Manet's wife, Suzanne, in a similar setting and also from 1879

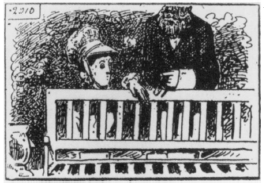
The caricaturist Morel-Retz (pseudonym "Stop") published this caricature of In the Conservatory in Journal amusant (May 17, 1879) with the caption "An innocent young person cornered in the conservatory by an infamous seducer"

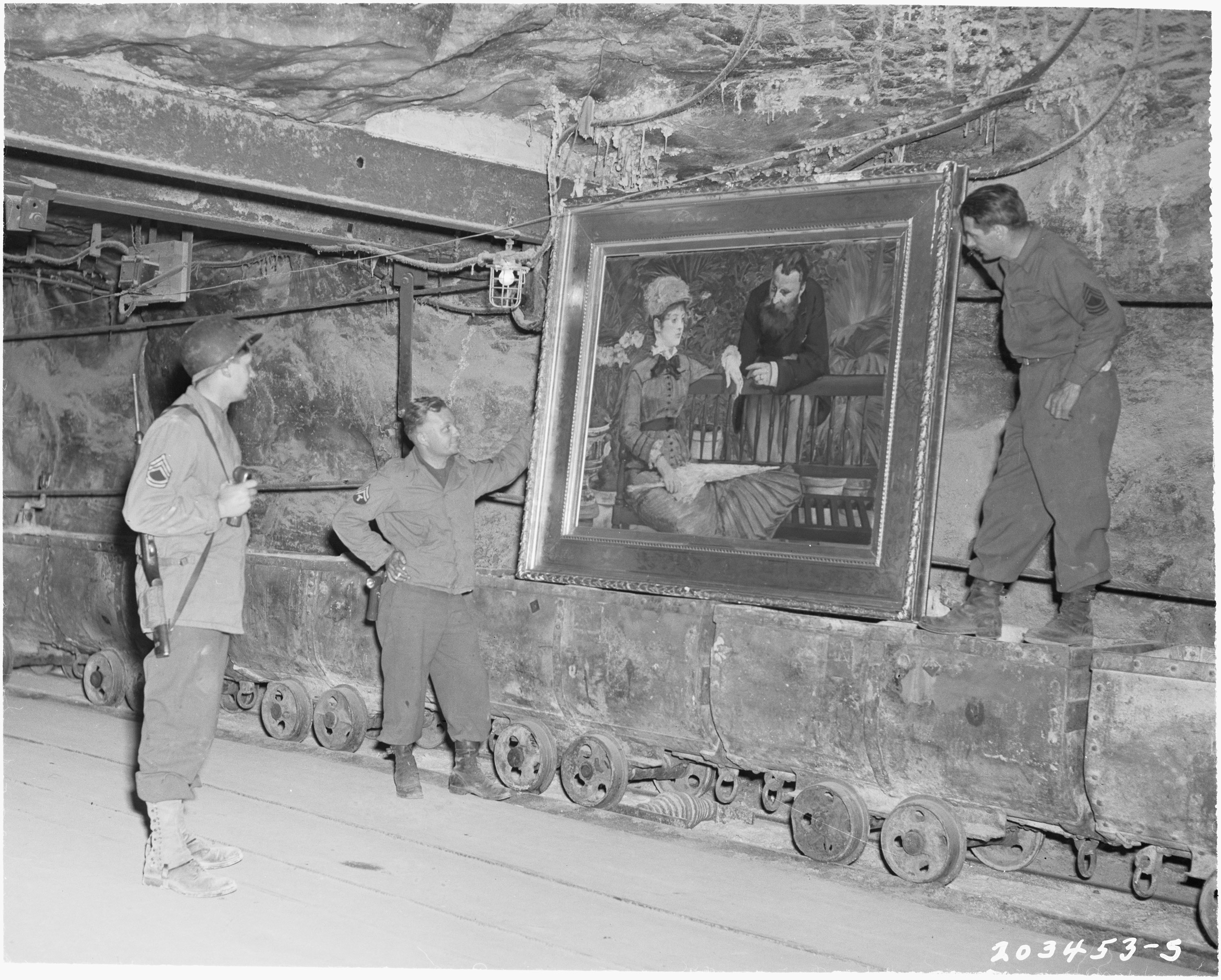
The painting was brought along with other pictures from the German National Gallery to a mine to protect it from the bomb war in World War II. This 1945 photograph shows US soldiers with the painting in the Merkers salt mine.

== See also ==
- List of paintings by Édouard Manet
