= Werra =

River in central Germany

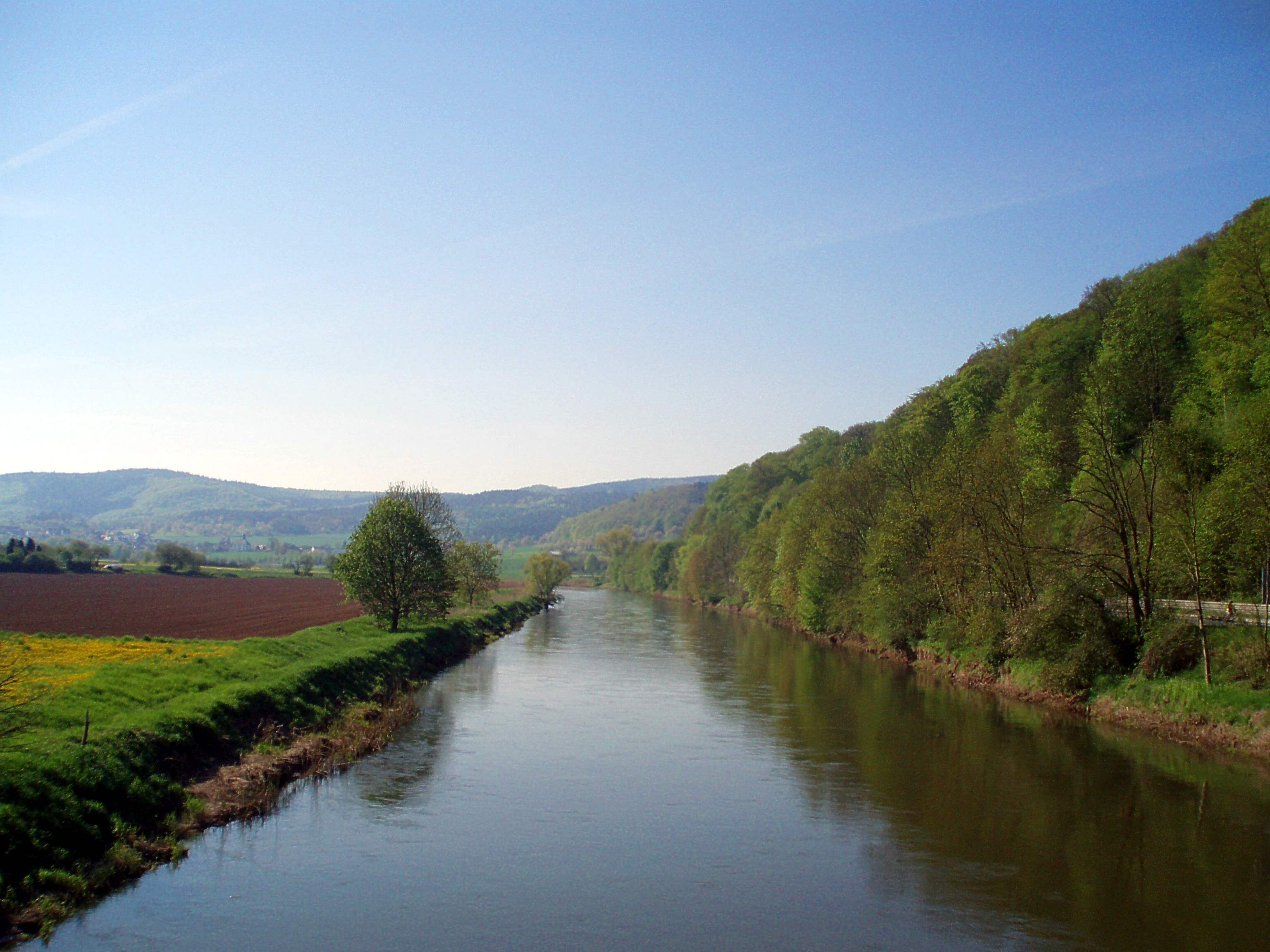

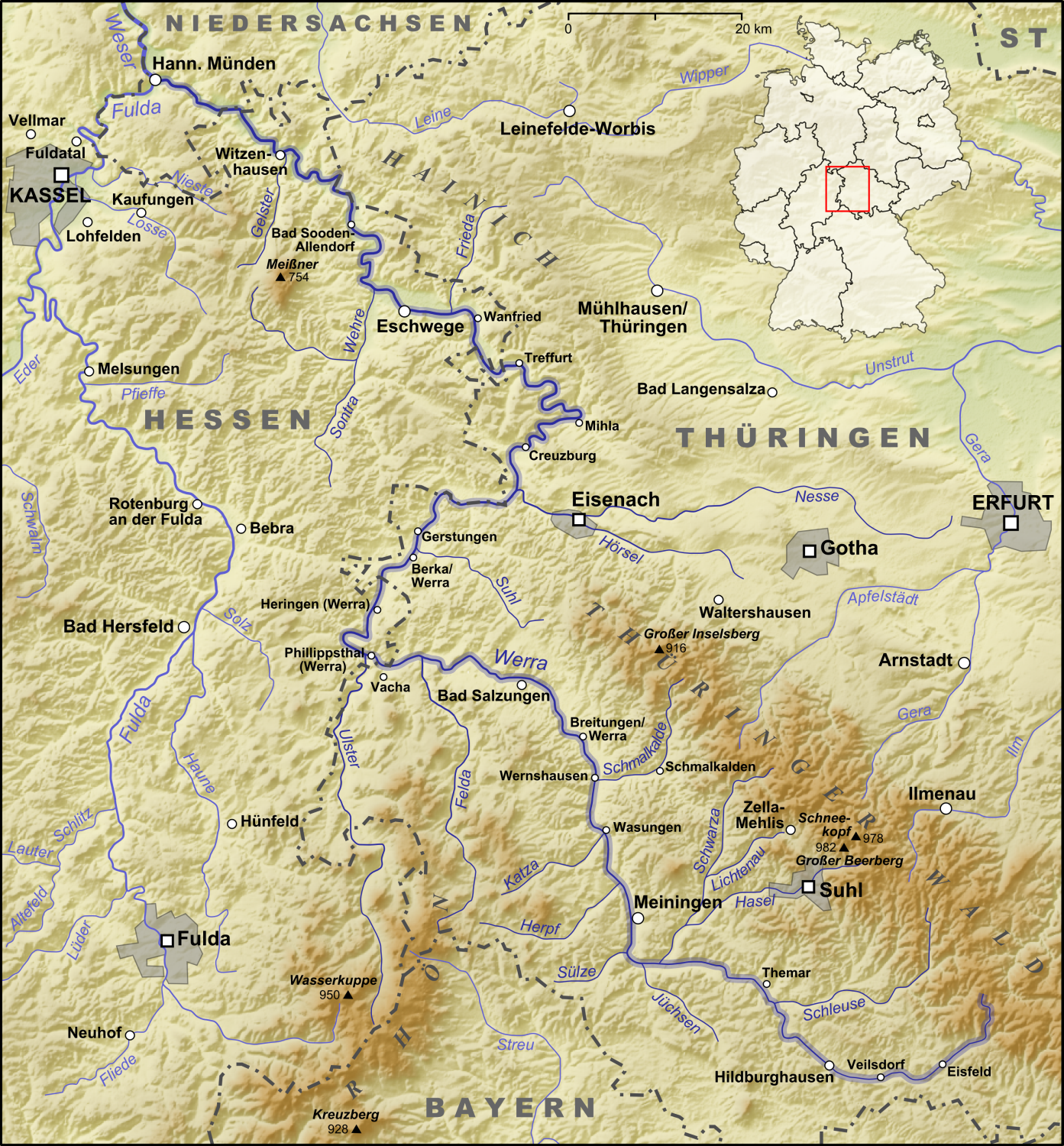
- Course of the Werra

Location
- Country: Germany
- States: Hesse; Lower Saxony; Thuringia

Physical characteristics
- Source
  - coordinates: 50°29′59″N 10°57′53″E
  - elevation: 797 m above sea level (NN)
- Mouth
  - location: confluence with the Fulda in Hann. Münden to form the Weser
  - coordinates: 51°25′16″N 9°38′57″E
  - elevation: 116.5 m above sea level (NN)
- Length: 299.6 km (186.2 mi)
- Basin size: 5,496 km^{2} (2,122 sq mi)
- Discharge
  - location: am Pegel Meiningen
  - average: 14.0 m^{3}/s (490 cu ft/s)
- Discharge
  - location: Vacha
  - average: 23.6 m^{3}/s (830 cu ft/s)
- Discharge
  - location: Gerstungen
  - average: 30.9 m^{3}/s (1,090 cu ft/s)
- Discharge
  - location: Frankenroda
  - average: 40.6 m^{3}/s (1,430 cu ft/s)
- Discharge
  - location: Allendorf
  - average: 46.5 m^{3}/s (1,640 cu ft/s): Location: Letzter Heller, bei Hann. Münden; Average rate: 51.2 m^{3}/s (1,810 cu ft/s)

Basin features
- Progression: Weser→ North Sea
- Landmarks: Large towns: Meiningen, Eisenach, Eschwege, Hann. Münden; Small towns: Bad Salzungen, Vacha, Creuzburg, Treffurt
- Tributaries
  - left: Ulster, Felda, Wehre
  - right: Schleuse, Hasel, Hörsel
- Navigable: 89 km (55 mi); motor boats in places, but not throughout

The Werra (German pronunciation: [ˈvɛʁa]) is a 293-kilometre (182 mi) river in central Germany. The right-bank headwater of the Weser, it has its source near Eisfeld in southern Thuringia. The Werra joins the river Fulda in the town of Hann. Münden, forming the Weser. If the Werra is included as part of the Weser, the Weser is the longest river entirely within German territory at 744 kilometres (462 mi). "Weser" is a synonym for Werra in an old dialect of German.

Its valley, the Werratal, has many tributaries and is a relative lull between the Rhön Mountains and the Thuringian Forest.

Its attractions include Eiben Forest near Dermbach, an unusual sandstone cave at Walldorf, the deepest lake in Germany formed by subsidence (near Bernshausen), and Krayenburg, the ruins of a castle.

The towns and main settlements along the Werra are Hildburghausen, Meiningen, Bad Salzungen, Tiefenort, Merkers-Kieselbach, Vacha, Heringen, Philippsthal, Gerstungen, Wanfried, Eschwege, Bad Sooden-Allendorf, Witzenhausen and Hannoversch Münden.

== Gallery ==
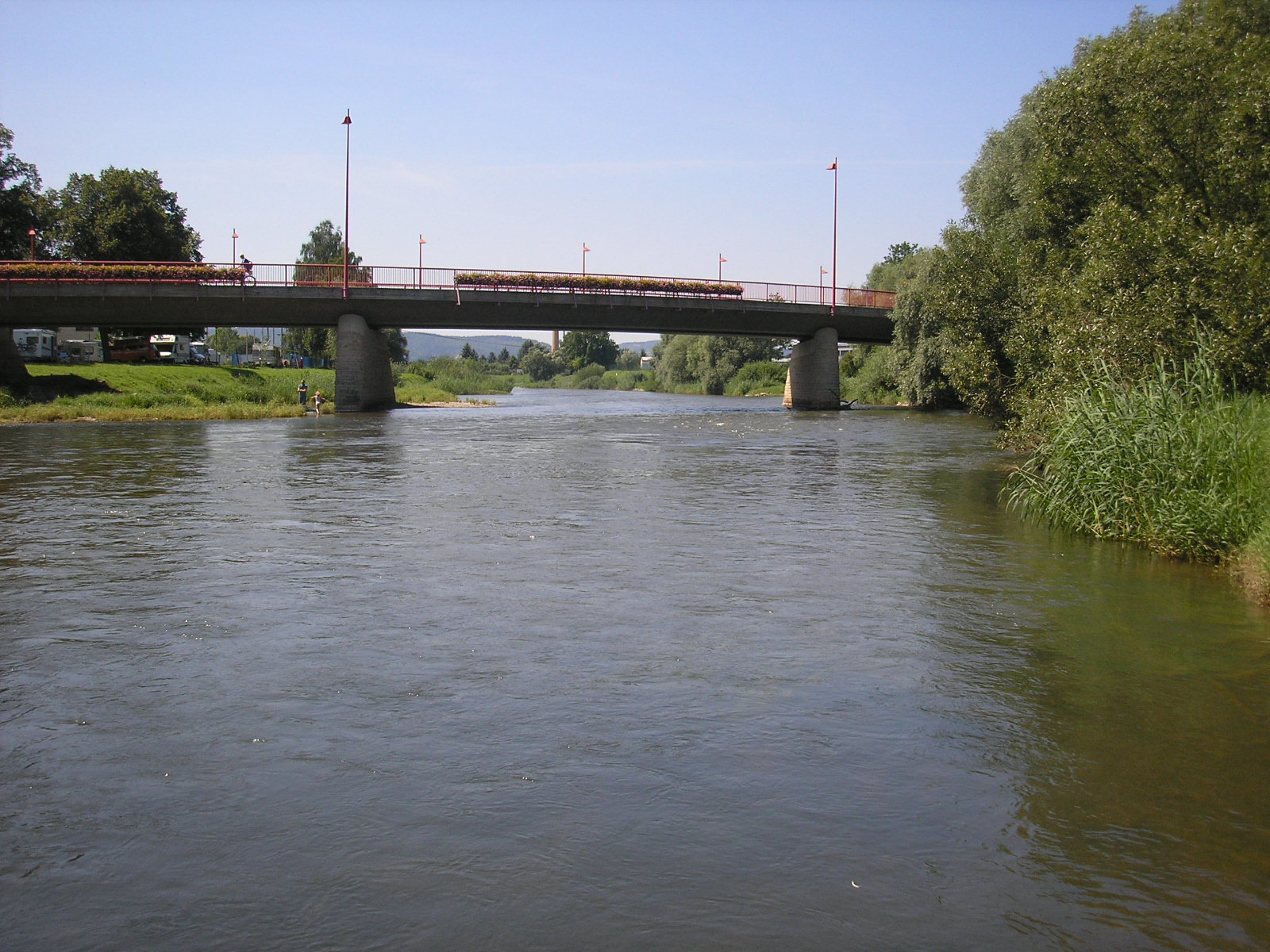
The Werra near Treffurt

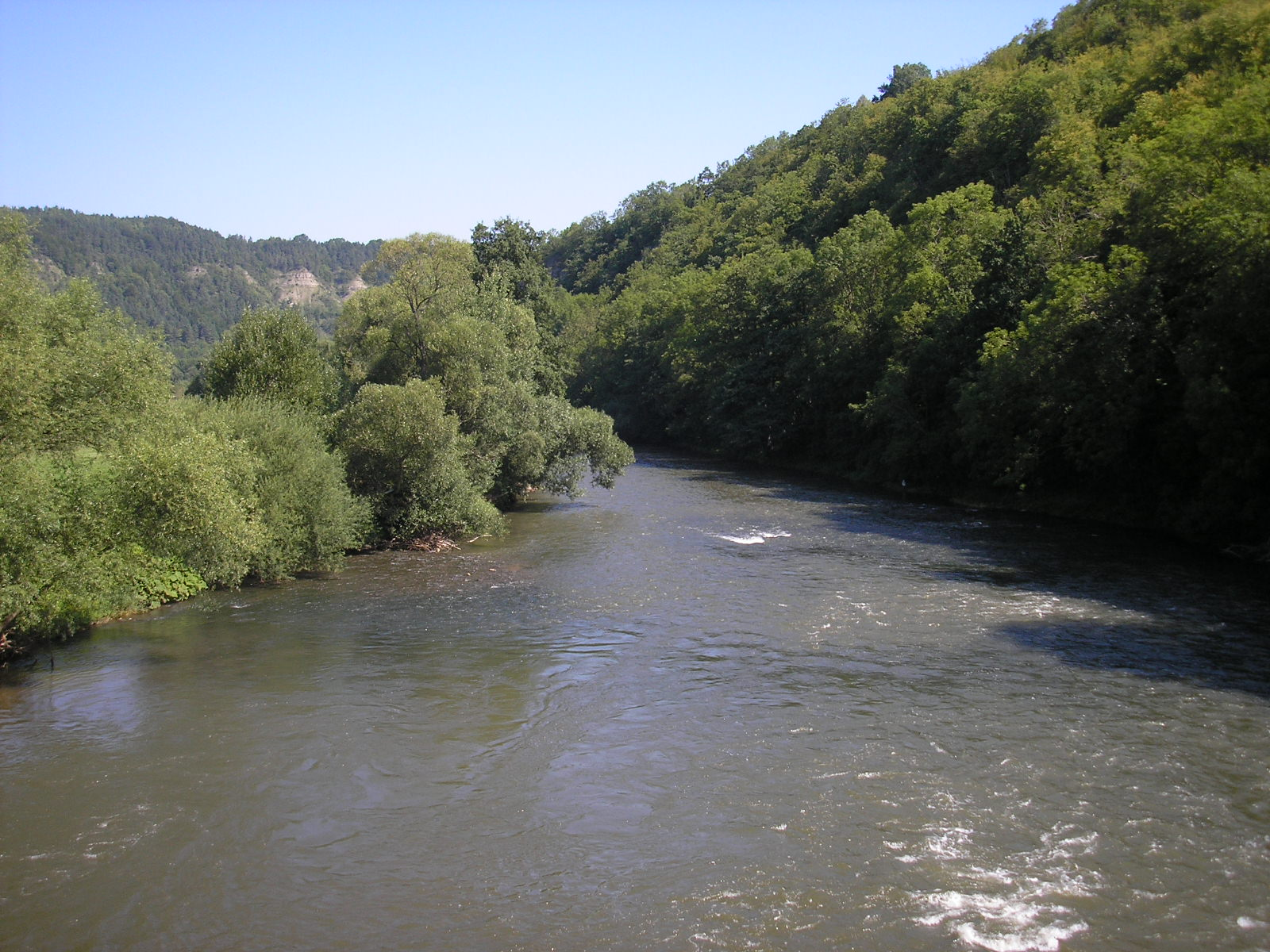
The Werra near Creuzburg

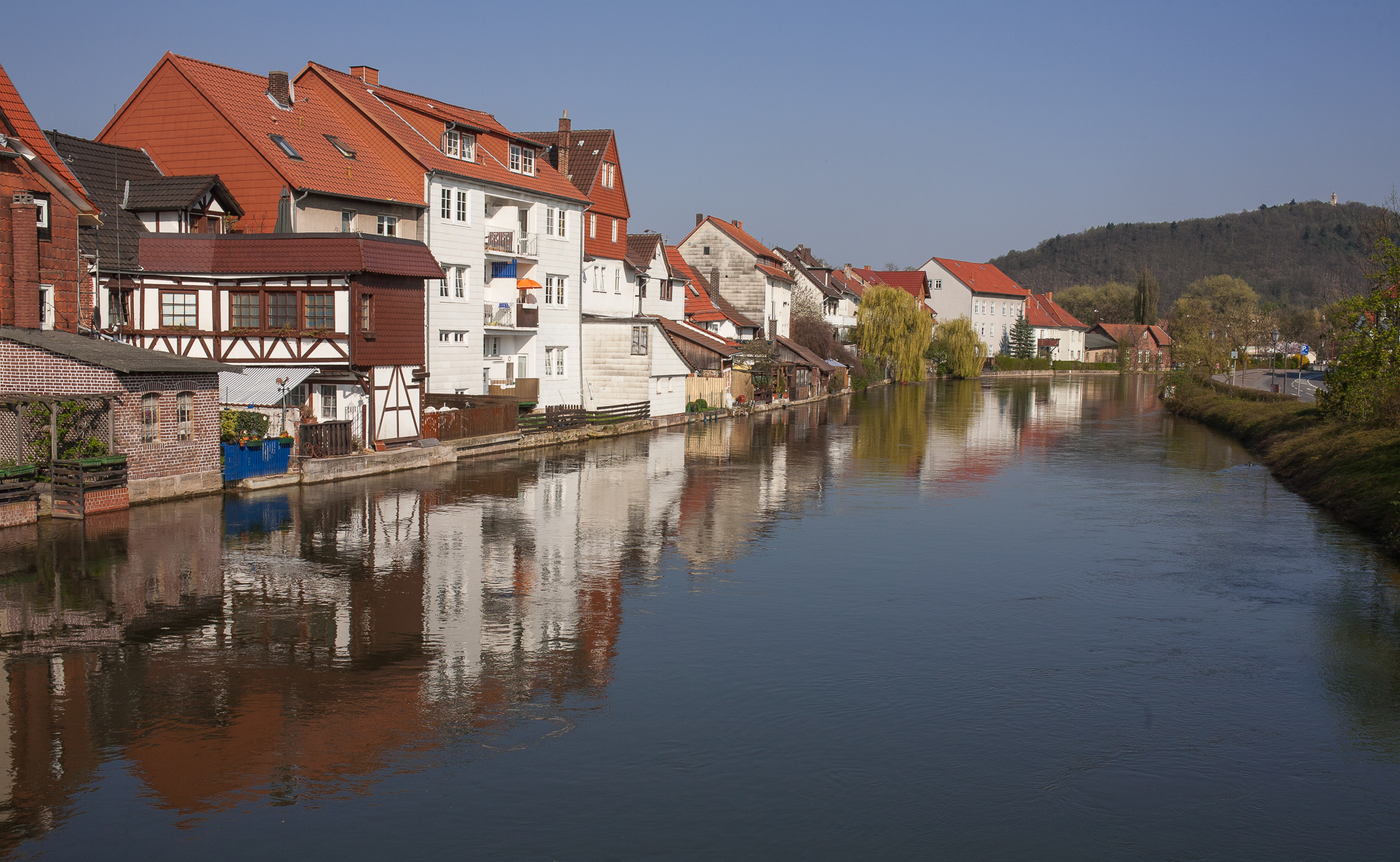
The Werra in Eschwege

== See also ==
- Werra Viaduct, Hedemünden
- List of rivers of Thuringia
- List of rivers of Hesse
- List of rivers of Lower Saxony
