= Dorndorf =

- Ortsteil of Krayenberggemeinde
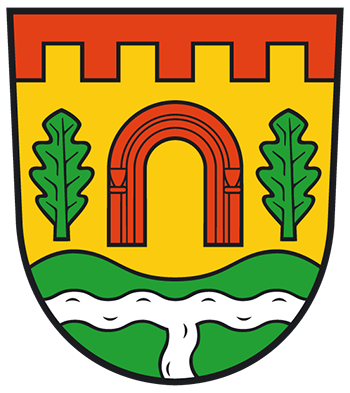
- Coat of arms
- Interactive map of Dorndorf
- Location within Germany Location within Thuringia
- Coordinates: 50°50′10″N 10°5′11″E
- Country: Germany
- State: Thuringia
- District: Wartburgkreis
- Municipality: Krayenberggemeinde

Area
  - Total: 12.12 km^{2} (4.68 sq mi)
- Elevation: 250 m (820 ft)

Population (2012-12-31)
  - Total: 2,434
  - Density: 200.8/km^{2} (520.1/sq mi)
- Time zone: UTC+01:00 (CET)
  - Summer (DST): UTC+02:00 (CEST)
- Postal codes: 36460
- Dialling codes: 036963
- Vehicle registration: WAK
- Website: www.dorndorf.de

Dorndorf (German pronunciation: [ˈdɔʁnˌdɔʁf]) is a village and a former municipality in the Wartburgkreis district of Thuringia, Germany. Since 31 December 2013, it is part of the municipality Krayenberggemeinde.
