= Tiefenort =

- Stadtteil of Bad Salzungen
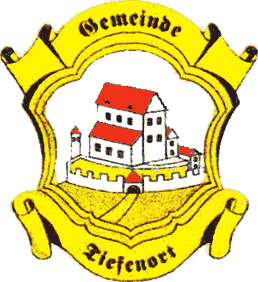
- Coat of arms
- Interactive map of Tiefenort
- Location within Germany Location within Thuringia
- Coordinates: 50°50′N 10°10′E
- Country: Germany
- State: Thuringia
- District: Wartburgkreis
- Town: Bad Salzungen

Area
  - Total: 34.71 km^{2} (13.40 sq mi)
- Elevation: 240 m (790 ft)

Population (2016-12-31)
  - Total: 3,869
  - Density: 111.5/km^{2} (288.7/sq mi)
- Time zone: UTC+01:00 (CET)
  - Summer (DST): UTC+02:00 (CEST)
- Postal codes: 36469
- Dialling codes: 03695
- Website: www.tiefenort.de

Tiefenort (German pronunciation: [ˈtiːfn̩ˌʔɔʁt]) is a village and a former municipality in the Wartburgkreis district of Thuringia, Germany. Since July 2018, it is part of the town Bad Salzungen. It is situated on the river Werra, 5 km west of Bad Salzungen, and 8 km east of Vacha, Germany.

== History ==
An 1137 document of the Hersfeld Abbey already contains a reference to Tiefenort (Diffeshart). The establishment of the township was closely related to the castle Krayenburg, which dates back to 786 (at least).

Within the German Empire (1871-1918), Tiefenort was part of the Grand Duchy of Saxe-Weimar-Eisenach.

== Notable people ==
- Edgar Most (1940−2015)*, last Vice President of the State's bank of GDR and advisor of the German government for the "Aufbau Ost" programme after 1990
