= Merkers-Kieselbach =

- Ortsteil of Krayenberggemeinde
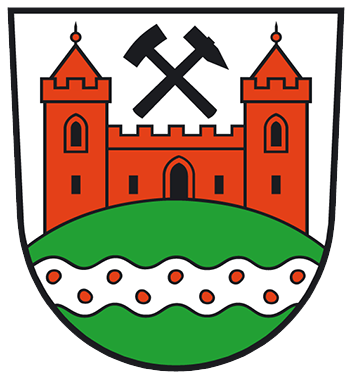
- Coat of arms
- Interactive map of Merkers-Kieselbach
- Location within Germany Location within Thuringia
- Coordinates: 50°49′N 10°7′E
- Country: Germany
- State: Thuringia
- District: Wartburgkreis
- Municipality: Krayenberggemeinde

Area
  - Total: 19.43 km^{2} (7.50 sq mi)
- Elevation: 250 m (820 ft)

Population (2012-12-31)
  - Total: 2,895
  - Density: 149.0/km^{2} (385.9/sq mi)
- Time zone: UTC+01:00 (CET)
  - Summer (DST): UTC+02:00 (CEST)
- Postal codes: 36460
- Dialling codes: 036969, 036963
- Vehicle registration: WAK

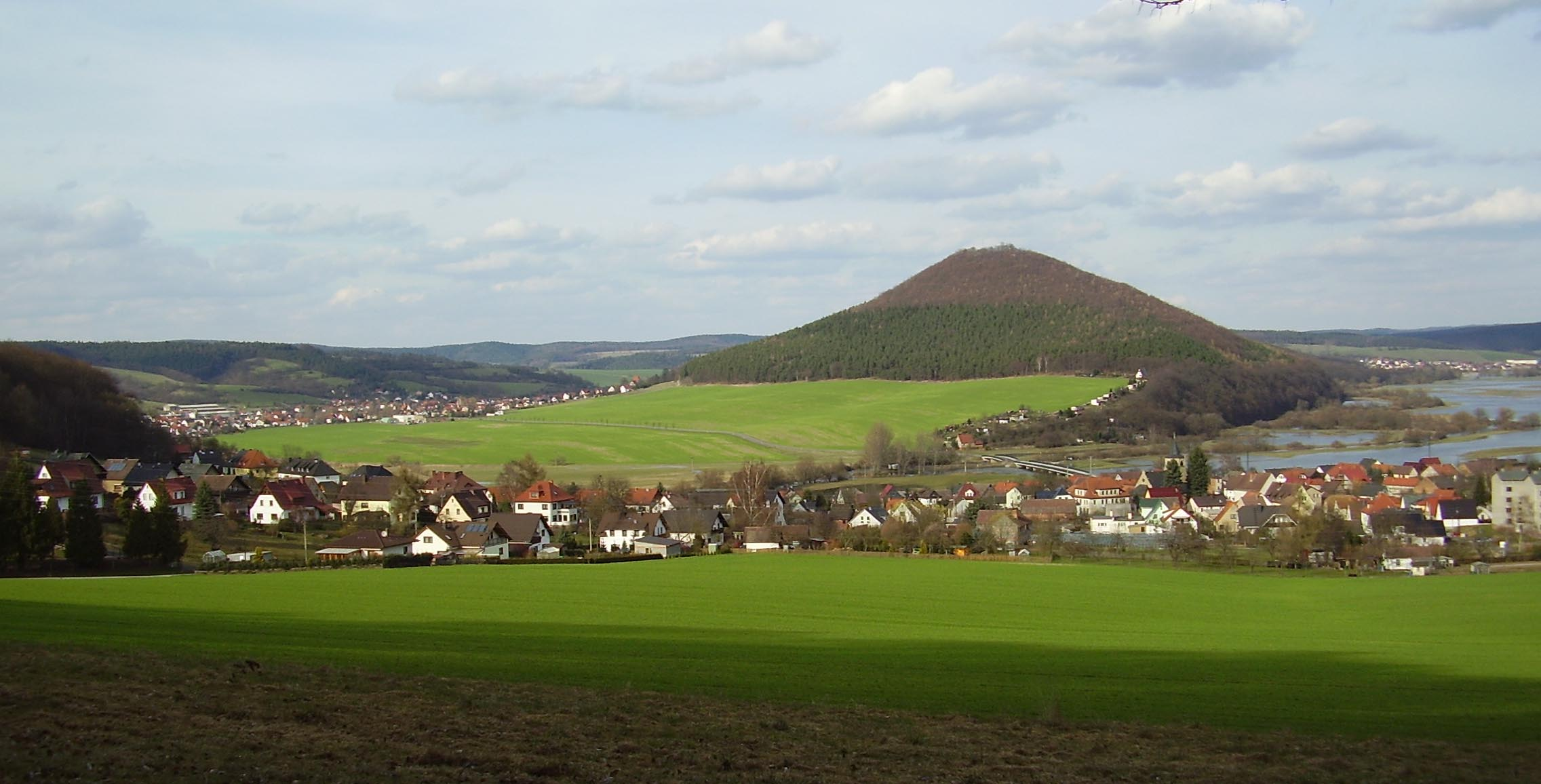
Panoramic, c. 2006

Merkers-Kieselbach (German pronunciation: [ˈmɛʁkɐs ˈkiːzl̩ˌbax]) is a former municipality in the Wartburgkreis district of Thuringia, Germany. Since 31 December 2013, it is part of the municipality Krayenberggemeinde.

== Geography ==
Merkers-Kieselbach lies on either side of the River Werra near the Thuringian Forest and Rhön hills. It contains the settlements of Merkers, Kieselbach and Kambachsmühle.

== History ==
Kieselbach was first mentioned 1155 in a deed from Kloster Hersfeld, and Merkers in 1308.

Merkers-Kieselbach was formed in 1994 by merging the two village councils. but didn't last long, as in 2013 it too merged with the neighbouring Dorndorf forming Krayenberggemeinde.

The ceremonial coat-of arms of the authority was designed in 1994 by the heraldic designer Uwe Reipert. The "Wellenbalken or silver fess wavy" with "Kieseln- golden stones" symbolises the word Kieselbach, the castle symbolises the Krayenburg Crossed miners hammers and a green hill are included.

=== Population statistics ===
Population

- 1994: 3706
- 1995: 3710
- 1996: 3623
- 1997: 3553
- 1998: 3493
- 1999: 3458
- 2000: 3425
- 2001: 3375
- 2002: 3349
- 2003: 3285
- 2004: 3190
- 2005: 3167
- 2006: 3171
- 2007: 3118
- 2008: 3098
- 2009: 3059
- 2010: 3042
- 2011: 2977
- 2012: 2895

Data source: Thüringer Landesamt für Statistik - Taken on 31 December

=== Last Council ===
The last Merkers-Kieselbach chamber had 16 elected members:

- FWG Merkers-Kieselbach: 5 members
- CDU: 5 members
- LINKE: 4 members
- SPD: 1 member
- GRÜNE: 1 member

Data source: Kommunalwahl am 7 June 2009.

=== Last elected Bürgermeister ===
The last elected Bürgermeister, Inka Sollmann, (independent) taking 91% of the popular vote.

== World War II ==
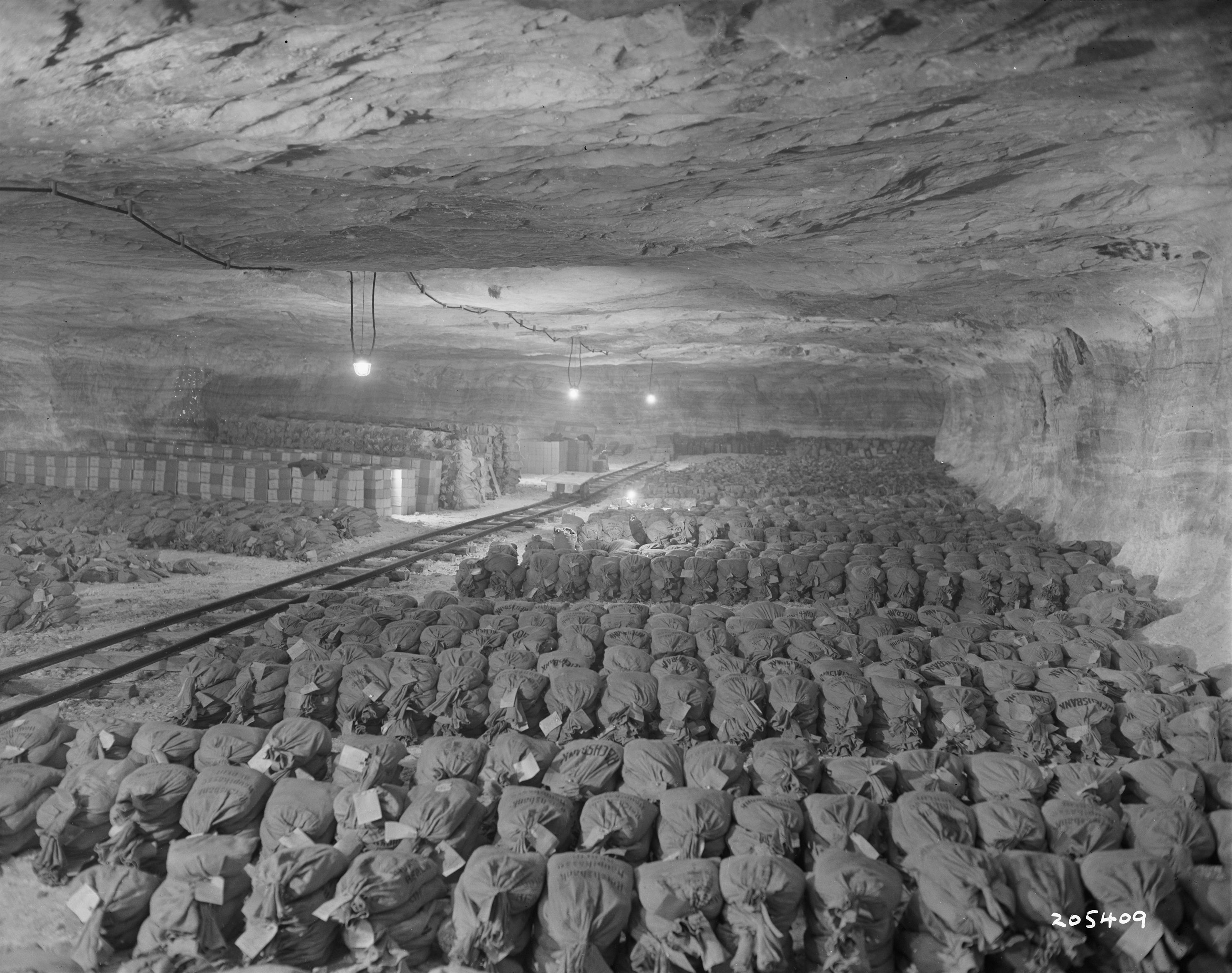
Nazi treasures in Merkers Salt Mine

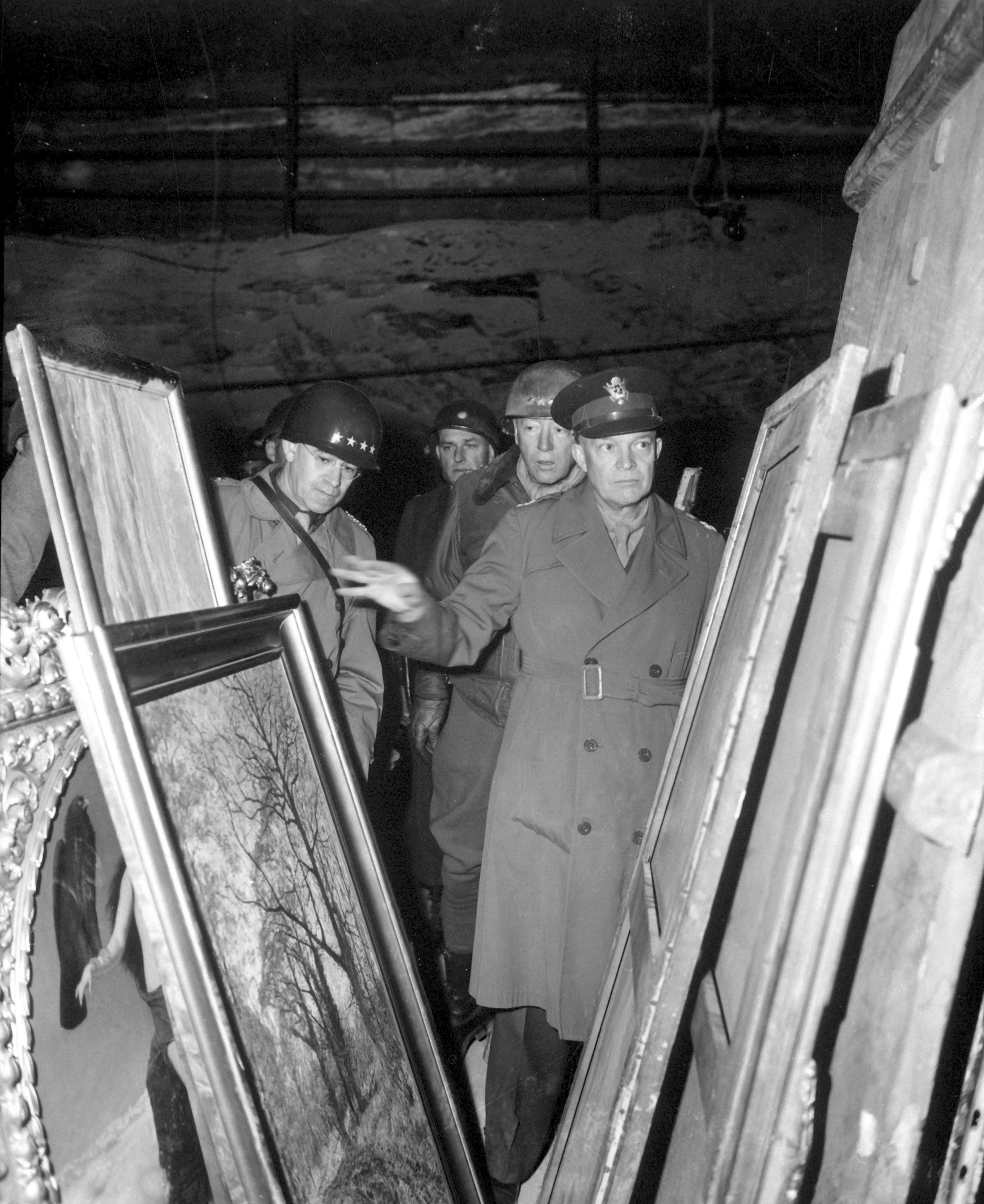
Eisenhower inspects stolen artwork

The Merkers area of the municipality is famous for its salt mine, where large amounts of Nazi gold, and many stolen works of art were discovered by the United States Army in 1945. General Dwight D. Eisenhower himself went into the mine in April 1945 in order to examine the find. The area is now a visitor attraction, the Merkers Adventure Mines.

=== Capture of Merkers ===
Merkers was captured by the advancing Third Army in the spring of 1945.

“…the 90th Division… reached the Werra River on April 2nd (1945), crossed immediately, and discovered that there, in a last desperate effort, the enemy had erected a line beyond which the Americans were not to advance. Ignorant of the German determination to hold at all costs, however, the 90th advanced, smashed the line, and moved forward. Vacha was taken with stiff opposition, Dippach and Oberzella and Merkers. One regiment was detailed to guard the treasure at Merkers, and the rest of the Division pushed ahead. All roads were lined with liberated slave laborers, some walking aimlessly, becoming slowly accustomed to their freedom, some walking determinedly, burdened by huge packs, with their eyes firmly fixed on the road leading to home. Allied prisoners of war were liberated in increasingly large numbers: American, British, Canadian, French and Russians. The German Army was dissolving into a hodge-podge of Volksturm, Hitler Jugend, highly disorganized veterans and a few SS. As usual, resistance was encountered at only infrequent intervals, and as usual, it was quickly overwhelmed.”

“…The next morning [April 2, 1945] we headed out in motorized column for Bad Hersfeld, and then on via a two lane road to positions just west of the Werra River… Earlier in the day our rifle companies had crossed the Werra and captured the town of Dippach, and then run unexpectedly into fierce and determined resistance, again from Hitler Youth and SS troops, in the Town of Vitzeroda. C company lost six men killed and about 30 wounded… While the 357th was heavily engaged in Vitzeroda and other nearby villages, the 358th, to our south had followed a main road eastward over the Werra, taking Vacha and Merkers. We, in the 357th, were laboring over small country roads and paths, taking village after village, many of which had names with the syllable “roda” which we later learned meant “mine.” Thus, “Vitzeroda” and “Gosperoda”.

Battle History, 3rd Bn., 358th lnf:

“The famed Salt Mine of Merkers was cleared early on the 4th (of April) by a patrol of Co. I. All the Battalion knew at the time, however, was that the mine contained some German equipment and money. This much the troops knew from the slave laborers as they passed through. It was not until days later that Division MPs discovered the mine contained the largest treasure hoard ever found. Everyone in Co I is still sorry they did not have more time to spare in Merkers. From here the Battalion pushed rapidly forward, clearing the resort town of Bad Salzungen and securing a bridgehead over the Werra river before dark."
"…our assigned unit, Company A of the 357th Infantry Regiment of the 90th Infantry Division of the 3rd Army under General George S. Patton… We traveled mostly by foot, occasionally riding a tank as we went. One of our first experiences of interest was capturing a German town near a mine that they used to hide gold and valuable paintings that the Nazis had stolen from other countries. Our assignment was to guard this area until the valuables could be moved out. The valuables were hidden in a salt mine approximately 2000 feet underground. As the Germans mined the salt it had made rooms that were used to hide and store the valuables. We got there before they sealed the doorways to these rooms. They had planned on hiding this to keep it from being captured. To get down into these mines we had to have a German operate the electric elevator. We used these elevators to remove the gold and paintings which were loaded onto trucks. At the top of the mine were stored hundreds of heavy woollen coats. (Note: Possibly these were some of the woolen coats and sheepskin greatcoats kept in the mines. Later the coats were used to protect the paintings for shipment. According to Ronald H. Bailey (2007): “And to cushion the sculpture and paintings for shipment, they improvised packing material from sheepskin greatcoats tailored for the German invasion of Russia but never delivered to the freezing troops driving toward Moscow in cotton summer uniforms. The coats had been discovered at a salt mine in Merkers along with 100 tons of gold, 27 Rembrandts and other treasures from the 15 state museums of Berlin.”) They allowed us to have what we wanted to mail home. I took two. I had a truck driver take mine back where he could send them home for me. They arrived home and I still have one of them."

== Culture and attractions ==
- Wehrkirche im Ortsteil Kieselbach - This was built in 1563, though the oldest of its three bronze bells dates from 1462 probably coming the Kapelle auf der Krayenburg.
- Historic Fachwerkhäuser in both communities. Vier-Seiten-Hof- in Kieselbach is the oldest and still inhabited.
- Regionalmuseum Krayenbergregion - is an Heimatmuseum in Kieselbach.
- "Andreas-Fack-Haus" - There is small museum in the family home of the Rhönlied-Dichters, Andreas Fack
