= Dermbach (Verwaltungsgemeinschaft) =

Coordinates: 50.717°N 10.133°E

Dermbach is a former Verwaltungsgemeinschaft in the district Wartburgkreis in Thuringia, Germany. The seat of the Verwaltungsgemeinschaft was in Dermbach. It was disbanded in January 2019.

The Verwaltungsgemeinschaft Dermbach consisted of the following municipalities:

1. Brunnhartshausen
2. Dermbach
3. Neidhartshausen
4. Oechsen
5. Stadtlengsfeld
6. Urnshausen
7. Weilar
8. Wiesenthal
9. Zella/Rhön
