= Battle of Dermbach =

- Part of Austro-Prussian War
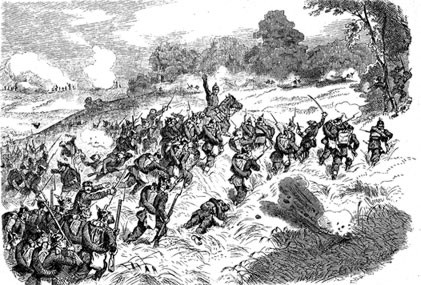
- Cäsar Rüstow in the Battle of Dermbach
Date	4 July 1866
Location	Dermbach, Saxe-Weimar-Eisenach 50°41′58″N 10°11′29″E
Result	Prussian Victory
Territorial changes	Prussian capture of Dermbach

Belligerents
Prussia	Bavaria

Commanders and leaders
August von Goeben; Cäsar Rüstow; Eduard von Falckenstein	Prince Karl of Bavaria

Units involved
13th Division	3rd Division; 4th Division

Strength
Unknown, around 5,000 soldiers	15,000 soldiers

Casualties and losses
48 killed 274 wounded 22 missing and captured	est. 5,100 killed
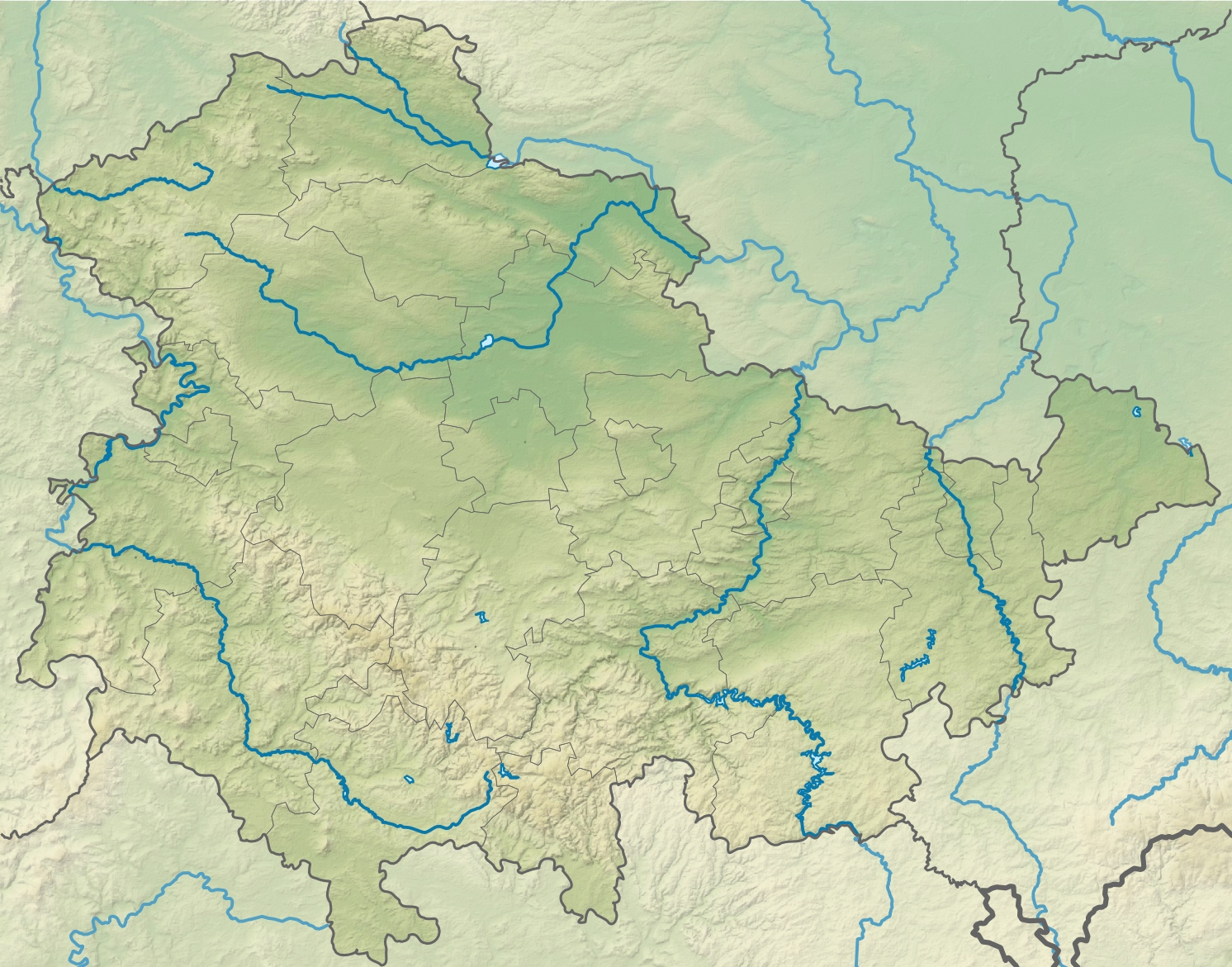
- Location within Thuringia Battle of Dermbach (Germany)

The Battle of Dermbach was the first clash between Prussian and Bavarian troops in the Austro-Prussian War near Dermbach, Saxe-Weimar-Eisenach in modern-day Thuringia on 4 July 1866.

On the Prussian side, the 13th Division under Lieutenant General von Goeben was deployed which faced parts of the 3rd and 4th Bavarian infantry divisions with a total strength of approx. 15,000 men. The Commander-in-Chief on the Bavarian side was Prince Karl.

== Starting Positions ==
The Prussian Main Army, formed from three divisions under the command of General Eduard von Falckenstein, had been advancing from Eisenach towards Fulda since 1 July. This was also the aim of the Bavarian Army, which wanted to unite there with the allied 8th Federal Corps (contingents from Baden, Württemberg, Hesse-Darmstadt, Hesse-Kassel, the Nassau and Austria).

On 2 and 3 July there had already been minor skirmishes between the Prussian and Bavarian armies near Immelborn and Dermbach. Falckenstein believed that he was only dealing with weak Bavarian forces. He therefore gave the 13th Prussian Division the order to push back the enemy with a "short advance". The two skirmishes at Zella and Neidhartshausen and at Wiesenthal developed from this.

== The Battle ==
The Prussian advance with about 5000 men on Neidhartshausen and Zella was successful. It was possible to drive the Bavarian troops from their positions there. There was fierce fighting in the area of the Zella monastery. In the afternoon the Prussian troops withdrew from the occupied positions as ordered.

The advance against Wiesenthal, also with about 5000 men, was intended to secure the flanks of the units advancing towards Zella. Contrary to the order of the day, which had indicated the occupation of the village as the target, the rapidly advancing troops attacked the Nebelberg, southeast of Wiesenthal. Despite considerable losses, they managed to storm this extremely solid position and hold it for a long time. Since the Prussians withdrew in this phase, it was believed that the Bavarians had won a victory.

== Aftermath ==
The fight on the two battlefields did not result in a clear winner. The Prussian armed forces had achieved limited success by occupying Wiesenthal, Nebelberg and Zella, but were unable to force the Bavarians to retreat in general. The withdrawal of the Prussians was only an apparent success for the Bavarian army, since the return to the starting position was planned from the outset.

The fierceness of the fighting made the Bavarian army command feared that a comprehensive attack by the Prussian Main Army was imminent. The order was therefore issued to concentrate the army on 5 July at Kaltennordheim south of Zella. The Prussian attack did not take place, however, because the Main Army continued its advance towards Fulda after a short interruption, thereby distancing itself from the Bavarian army. Under the impression of the heavy defeat of the allied Austrians on 3 July 1866 in the Battle of Königgrätz, the Bavarian army command decided to retreat from Thuringia to Bavaria, because now the defense of Bavarian territory had to be a priority.

== Literature ==
- August Karl von Goeben: Das Gefecht bei Dermbach am 4. Juli 1866, Verlag Eduard Zernin, Darmstadt & Leipzig 1870 Digitalisat
- Theodor Fontane: Der deutsche Krieg von 1866. Verlag Rockstuhl, Bad Langensalza 2001, ISBN 3-934748-75-9
- Berichterstatter des Daheim: Der Feldzug der preußischen Main-Armee im Sommer 1866, Verlag Velhagen & Klasing, Bielefeld und Leipzig 1867
- Heinz Helmert; Hansjürgen Usczeck: Preußischdeutsche Kriege von 1864 bis 1871 – Militärischer Verlauf, 6. überarbeitete Auflage, Militärverlag der Deutschen Demokratischen Republik, Berlin 1988, ISBN 3-327-00222-3
