= Rüstow =

Rüstow or Rustow is a German surname. Notable people with the surname include:

- Alexander Rüstow (1885–1963), German sociologist and economist
- Alexander Rüstow (soldier) (1824–1866), Prussian soldier and military writer
- Cäsar Rüstow (1826–1866), Prussian soldier and military writer
- Dankwart Rustow (1924–1996), American political scientist
- Marina Rustow, American historian
- Wilhelm Rüstow (1821–1878), Prussian-born Swiss soldier and military writer
