= Stieglitz =

Stieglitz may refer to:

== People ==
- Stieglitz (surname)
- Alexander von Stieglitz (1814–1884) was a Russian philanthropist and financier
- Alfred Stieglitz (1864–1946), American photographer
  - Katherine Stieglitz (1898–1971), daughter of Emmeline and Alfred Stieglitz
- Joseph E. Stiglitz (born 1943), American economist, recipient of a Nobel Prize in economics
- Daniel Stieglitz (born 1980), German Artist, Director, Writer

== Places ==
- Stieglitz Museum of Applied Arts, museum in Saint Petersburg, Russia, founded by baron Alexander von Stieglitz
- Stieglitz, Victoria, small hamlet in Brisbane Ranges National Park, Australia
- Stieglitz, Tasmania, a locality in Australia
- Stieglitz, the former German name of Siedlisko, Greater Poland Voivodeship, Poland.

== See also ==
- Focke-Wulf Fw 44 Stieglitz, a German two-seat biplane
- Steglitz, neighborhood and former borough of Berlin
- Steiglitz (disambiguation)
- Stiglitz (disambiguation)
