= Stieglitz (surname) =

Stieglitz is a surname originating in Germany. Stieglitz, meaning goldfinch, was borrowed into German from a Slavic language, probably Old Czech stehlec.

The surname can have several possible origins. It is considered to have been an ornamental eke-name originally applied to a prominent family, noticeable in appearance for particularly (golden or strawberry) blonde-coloured hair, of Ashkenazi Jews residing within what is now central Germany, from whom Ludwig von Stieglitz was raised to the Russian nobility, and of Protestant Leipzig patricians of German nobility. With the consolidation and expansion eastwards of the German Empire, the name spread. The original German name has also shifted orthographically to Stiglitz and beyond; later, Stieglitz was also transcribed to Sztyglic in Polish and Штиглиц in Russian. It can be a nickname applied to someone who was cheerful or dressed in colorful clothing. It could also be an occupational name for someone who traded birds or caught them. In rare cases it can refer to origin from the Polish village of Siedlisko near Trzcianka, which was formerly called Stieglitz.

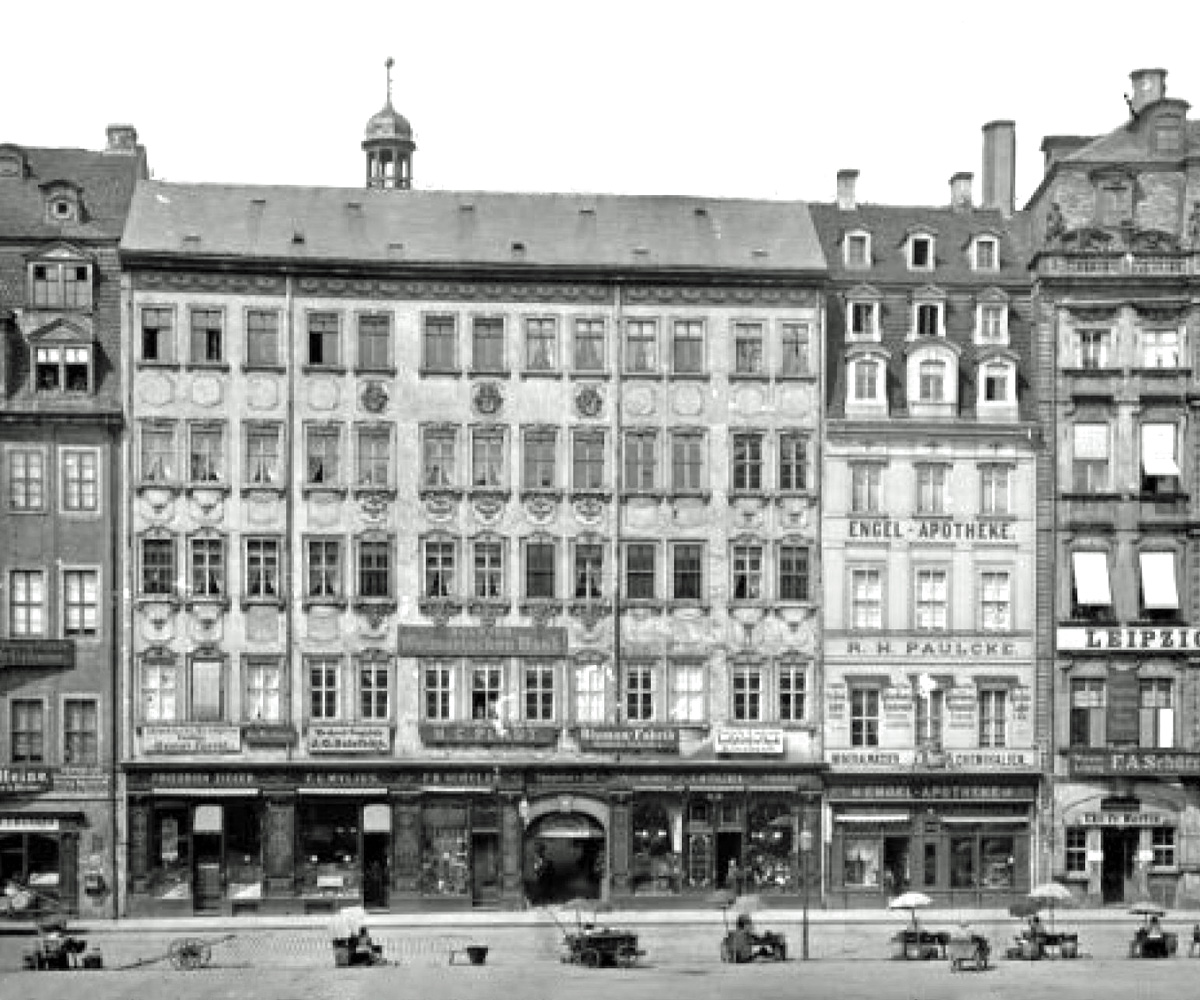
Stieglitzens Hof in 1890

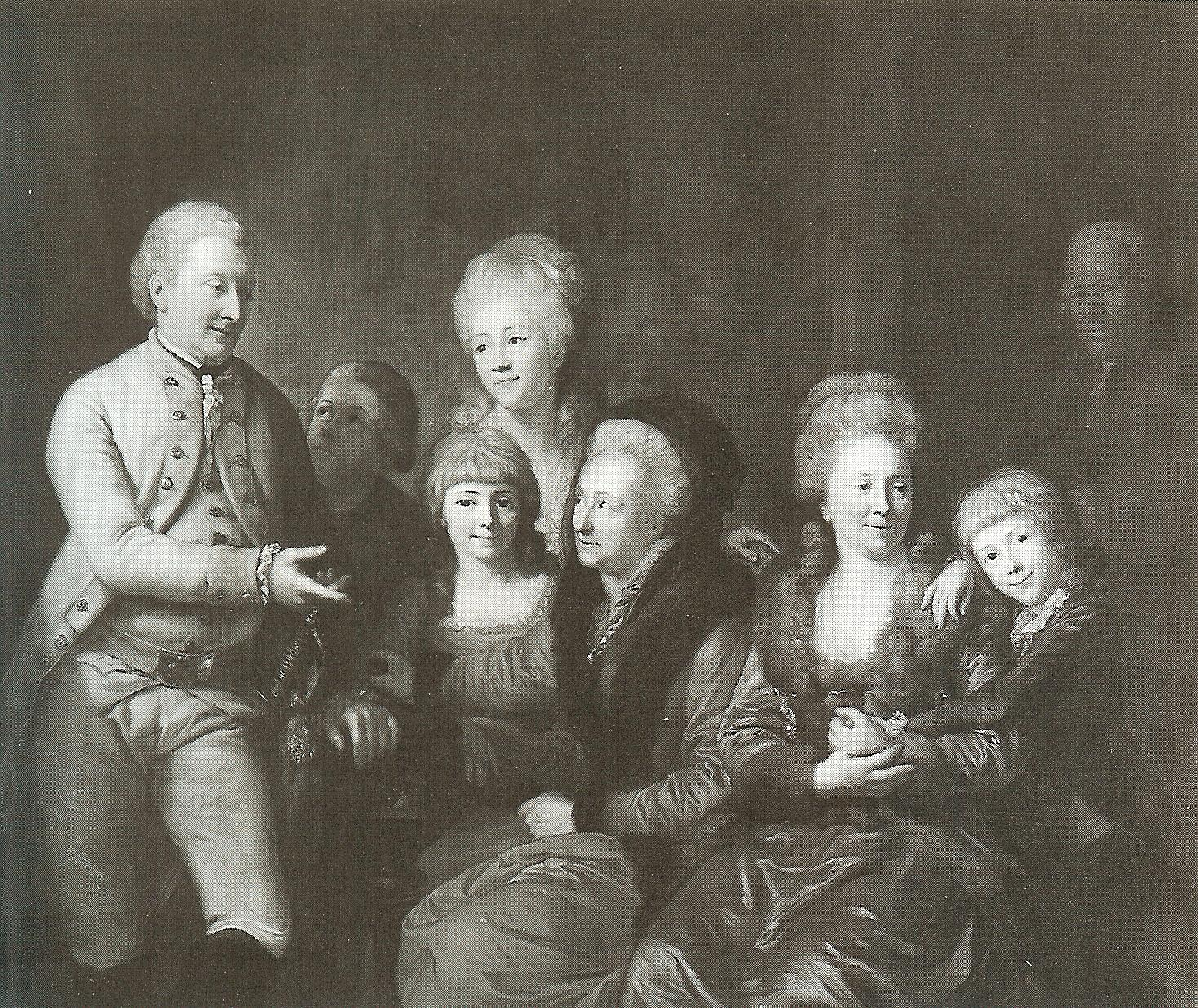
Anton Graff (1736–1813), the Family of Wilhelm Ludwig von Stieglitz, 1782

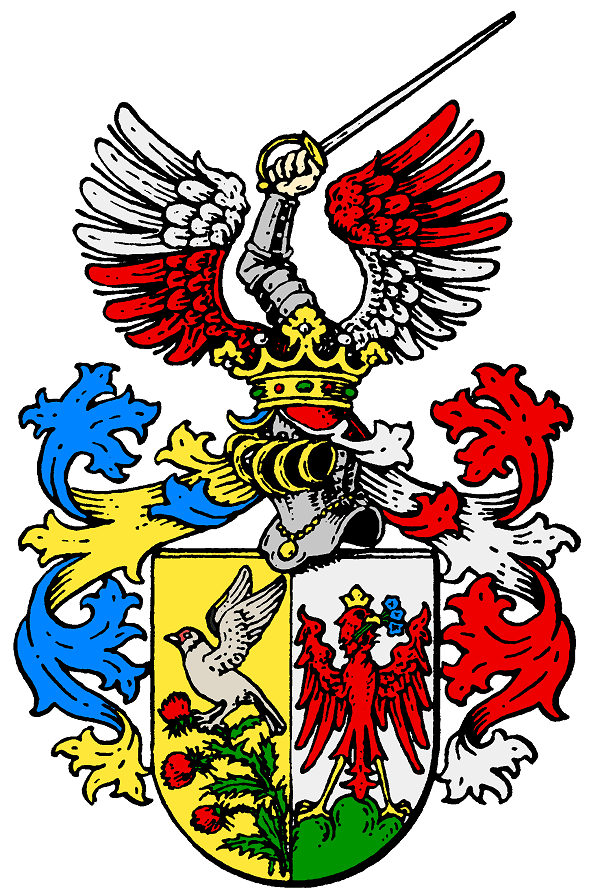
Coat of arms of the German Barons von Stieglitz, with goldfinch

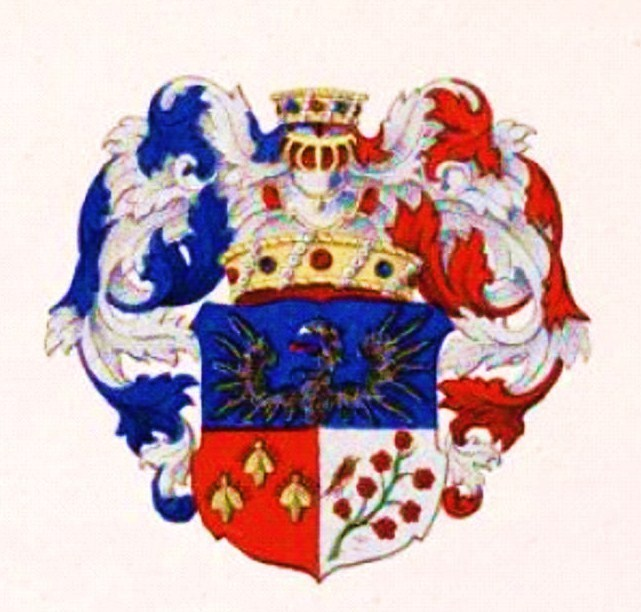
Coat of arms of the Baltic Russian Barons von Stieglitz, with goldfinch

== Stieglitz family ==
By the mid-18th century, two strands of the Stieglitz family were apparent as having emerged. Bartholomew Stieglitz, Mayor of Plzeň, Bohemia, was knighted in 1583 by Rudolf II, Holy Roman Emperor as Stieglitz von Čenkov; his son Kaspar and grandson Melchior Stieglitz fled to Saxony during the Thirty Years' War, where the family has since been established. In 1765, this patent of nobility was recognised by the Leipzig Council, and his great-grandson Christian Ludwig Stieglitz (1677–1758), long-time Mayor of Leipzig, was posthumously ennobled, he and his descendants occupying the Stieglitzens Hof in the central market square of Leipzig, forming a prominent political and legal dynasty of patricians. Sophie Charlotte von Stieglitz (1776–1839), the daughter of his son Wilhelm Ludwig von Stieglitz, an electoral Major of the Duchy of Saxe-Altenburg who was granted Mannichswalde, in 1799 married Dresden City Governor Heinrich Adolph von Gablenz and was mother of Austrian general Ludwig Karl Wilhelm von Gablenz. Mannichswalde was inherited by Thuisko von Stieglitz (1808–1881), the Royal Saxon Lieutenant General and Chief of the General Staff; his son Georg von Stieglitz (1848–1912) was a Saxon Lieutenant General, while his son Robert von Stieglitz (1865–1933) was a diplomat and the last Saxon envoy to the South German courts. The family also possessed Castle Langburkersdorf in Neustadt in Sachsen and Friedenthal in Hildburghausen.

Meanwhile, in 1725, 160 miles to the West in Bad Arolsen in the State of Waldeck, central Germany, Levi Stieglitz is recorded as arriving from nearby Bad Laasphe with his daughter, his two sons Hirsch Bernhard and Lazarus Stieglitz following in 1760. The family was granted Schutzjude status by Friedrich Karl August, with Hirsch Bernhard, his youngest son Jacob Friedrich, and Lazarus Stieglitz all serving as influential Court Jews (merchant bankers) to the Waldeckian Prince. Johann Stieglitz, eldest son of Lazarus Stieglitz, was sent to attend school in Gotha and studied philosophy in Berlin, later pursuing medicine at the University of Göttingen and practising as a physician in Hannover from 1789. Studying together in Göttingen, he became an erstwhile friend of Wilhelm von Humboldt, even saving him from drowning in the Leine.

=== Emigration ===
Nikolai (1770–1820) and Boris Bernhard Stieglitz (1774–1846), also sons of Lazarus Stieglitz, both emigrated to Kherson, Ukraine, to expand the family merchant business, becoming Imperial Russian Privy Councillors, the latter going on to become a successful merchant in Poltava, while the former eventually progressed to work in the Ministry of Finance in Saint Petersburg. Lazarus Stieglitz's youngest son Ludwig Stieglitz similarly moved as a young man to Russia as a representative of the family business, becoming an entrepreneur and banker of great capacity and influence, eventually appointed by Tsars Alexander I and Nicholas I to be court banker, investing in the construction of a steamship line between Lübeck and Saint Petersburg.

The family received the hereditary Russian nobility, with Ludwig's son Alexander von Stieglitz inheriting the running of the Stieglitz & Company bank, which he liquidated in 1863, becoming the first President of the State Bank of the Russian Empire. Many of the Stieglitz were elevated to the peerage, styling themselves as Barons von Stieglitz, and electing to adopt a goldfinch (rousant) for their heraldic crest; in 1846 Christian Ludwig Stieglitz (1803–1854) was similarly elected Baron by the King of Saxony, and the family expanded throughout central Europe.

His youngest son Heinrich Ludwig von Stieglitz (1762–1824) emigrated from Pilsen to County Armagh, Ireland; Heinrich's family, including Robert William von Stieglitz, later emigrated to Van Diemen's Land and Victoria in Australia in the 1830s to establish sheep runs on land grants and are considered early pioneers of Australia, establishing the (ironically misspelled) town of Steiglitz, Victoria and Stieglitz, Tasmania. At the same time Hirsch Bernard's eldest son Joseph Stieglitz emigrated to establish his company Mark & Sterlitz in New York City. Many family members, however, emigrated to Britain and America in the latter half of the 19th century and during the 20th century to escape the pogroms. Nevertheless, despite the family's extent throughout the German Empire by the 1850s, they were still concentrated in central Germany; Edward Stieglitz (1833–1909), father of Alfred Stieglitz and Julius Stieglitz, for instance emigrated to Hoboken, New Jersey, from Stadtlengsfeld, only 75 miles south-east of Bad Arolsen.

== Notable bearers of the surname ==
- Melchior Stieglitz (1629–1692), Leipzig lawyer and notary, father of Christian Ludwig Stieglitz (Jurist, 1677)
- Christian Ludwig Stieglitz (Jurist, 1677), Leipzig lawyer, councillor and Mayor of Leipzig, father of Christian Ludwig Stieglitz (Jurist, 1724), Erdmuthe Sophie von Stieglitz and Wilhelm Ludwig von Stieglitz
- Christoph Ludwig Stieglitz (1687–1768), Leipzig Lutheran theologian, father of Johann Konrad Stieglitz
- Christian Ludwig Stieglitz (Jurist, 1724), Leipzig lawyer and councillor in Vienna, and mineralogist, father of Christian Ludwig Stieglitz (Jurist, 1756) and grandfather of Robert William von Stieglitz
- Johann Konrad Stieglitz (1724–1795), Professor of Law at the University of Altdorf
- Hirsch Bernhard Stieglitz (1725–1798), Waldeckian banker, uncle of Johann Stieglitz and Ludwig von Stieglitz and grandfather of Heinrich Wilhelm Stieglitz
- Erdmuthe Sophie von Stieglitz (1726–1787), wife of merchant banker Christian Gottlob Frege
- Wilhelm Ludwig von Stieglitz (1735–1796), Saxon colonel and Viennese nobleman
- Christian Ludwig Stieglitz (Jurist, 1756), Leipzig lawyer, architect, councillor and dean, father of Christian Ludwig Stieglitz (Jurist, 1803)
- Johann Stieglitz (1767–1840), Hannoverian (Waldeckian) doctor and author
- Ludwig von Stieglitz (1779–1843), Waldeckian court banker to Tsars Alexander I and Nicholas I of Russia, father of Alexander von Stieglitz
- Heinrich Wilhelm Stieglitz (1801–1849), Waldeckian poet and husband of Charlotte Stieglitz
- Christian Ludwig Stieglitz (Jurist, 1803), Leipzig judge and freemason in Dresden
- Charlotte Stieglitz (1806–1834), Waldeckian author
- Thuisko von Stieglitz (1808–1881), Royal Saxon Lieutenant General and Chief of the General Staff, and father of Robert von Stieglitz
- Alexander von Stieglitz (1814–1884), Russian (Waldeckian) philanthropist and first Head of the State Bank of the Russian Empire
- Robert William von Stieglitz (1816–1876), one of the first pioneers and colonisers of Australia
- Wilhelm Stieglitz (1830–1907), German lawyer and official
- Alfred Stieglitz (1864–1946), American photographer, brother of Julius Stieglitz
- Robert von Stieglitz (1865–1933) diplomat and last Saxon envoy to the South German courts
- Julius Stieglitz (1867–1937), American chemist
- Herma Stiglitz (1921–2018), Viennese Roman archaeologist, wife of Roman Stiglitz
- Roman Stiglitz (1922–1988), Viennese historian
- Hugo Stiglitz (born 1940), Mexican actor
- Joseph Stiglitz (born 1943), American economist, recipient of the Nobel Prize in Economics
- Klaus-Peter Stieglitz (born 1947), German Lieutenant General
- Rudi Stieglitz (1952–2006), German musician
- Sylvia von Stieglitz (born 1955), German politician
- Daniel Stieglitz (born 1980), German director and illustrator
- Robert Stieglitz (born 1981), German professional boxer

== See also ==
- Hugo Stiglitz (character)
- Stieglitz Museum of Applied Arts, museum in Saint Petersburg, founded by Alexander von Stieglitz
- Focke-Wulf Fw 44 Stieglitz, a German two-seater biplane
- Steglitz, neighborhood and former borough of Berlin
- Steiglitz, Victoria, small hamlet in Brisbane Ranges National Park, Australia
- Stieglitz, Tasmania
- Steiglitz (disambiguation)
- Stierlitz
