= Stiglitz (disambiguation) =

Stiglitz may refer to:

- Gabriel Stiglitz, Argentine jurist.
- Hugo Stiglitz (born August 28, 1940), Mexican actor
- Hugo Stiglitz, a fictional character in the 2009 film Inglourious Basterds
- Jan Stiglitz, American law professor and co-founder of the California Innocence Project
- Joseph Stiglitz (born February 9, 1943), American economist
- Stiglitz Report, a 2010 book by Nobel Laureate economist Joseph Stiglitz

== See also ==
- Steiglitz (disambiguation)
- Stieglitz (disambiguation)
- Stiglitz Commission (disambiguation)
