= Johann Stieglitz =

German physician

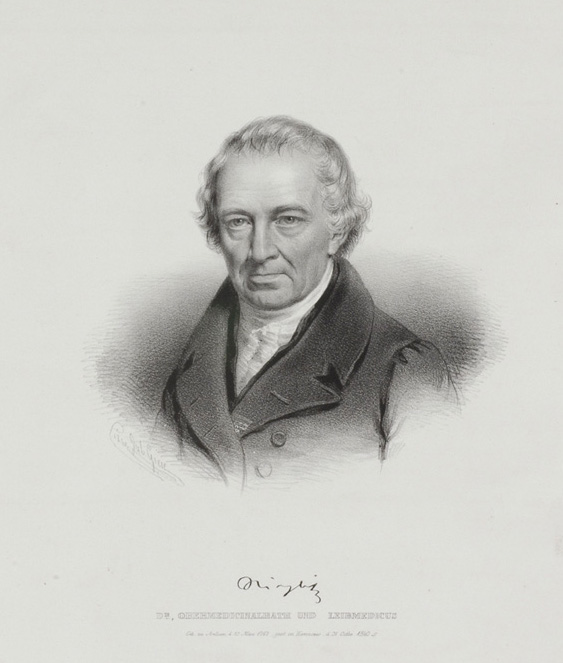
Johann Stieglitz (1767-1840)

Johann Stieglitz, born as Israel Stieglitz (10 March 1767, Arolsen – 31 October 1840, Hanover) was a German medical doctor. He was the brother of banker Ludwig von Stieglitz (1779-1843) and uncle to poet Heinrich Wilhelm Stieglitz (1801-1849).

Initially a philosophy student in Berlin, he later studied medicine at the University of Göttingen. In 1789 he moved to Hanover as a physician, successively serving as Hofmedikus (from 1802, court physician), Leibmedikus (from 1806), Hofrat (from 1820, councillor) and Obermedizinalrat and director of Hanover medical colleges (1832).

Known for his criticism of perceived "heresies of medicine", he was a vigorous opponent of speculative medical theories that included mesmerism and the Brunonian system. The following are a list of his principal published works:

- Versuch einer Prüfung und Verbesserung der jetzt gewöhnlichen Behandlungsart des Scharlachfiebers, 1807 - Essay on how to improve the testing and treatment of scarlet fever.
- Ueber den thierischen Magnetismus, 1814 - About animal magnetism.
- Pathologische Untersuchungen, 1832 - Pathological studies.
- Ueber die Homöopathie, 1835 - In regards to homeopathy.
