= International Society of Caricature Artists =

International non-profit trade association

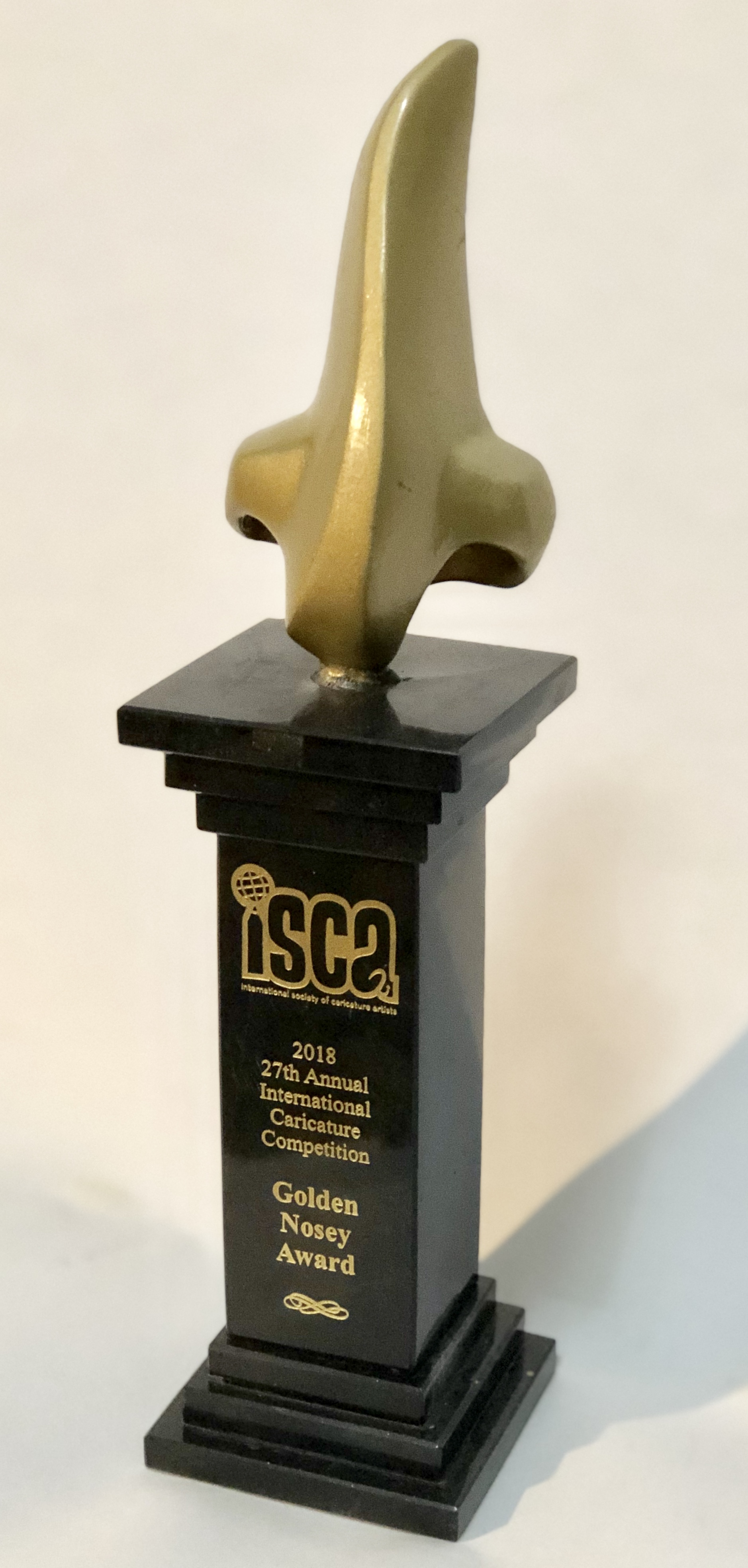
The Golden Nosey Award

The International Society of Caricature Artists (previously known as the National Caricaturist Network) is an international non-profit trade association founded in 1989. Its mission is to elevate the art and artists of caricature, promote the art of caricature, educate the public and the media about the art of caricature and to provide its members with helpful information about caricature as an art form as well as a profession. The ISCA currently (2021) has close to 500 members from around the world. Members receive the quarterly magazine, Exaggerated Features, which has articles about caricaturing, featured artists tips and stories as well as other useful information about caricature illustration. The ISCA annual conference is held each year in a different location. The conferences features a guest speaker, lectures, seminars, competitions, awards and the camaraderie of peers in the art of caricature drawing.

The quarterly newsletter, Exaggerated Features, is sent to the members and an annual conference is held for socialization as well as education and competition.

== History ==
The NCN was formed by Wallace "Buddy" Rose. Buddy created a forum for caricaturists by providing a quarterly newsletter and annual convention. The original goal was to create an organization that would seek out charitable and mutual benefits for united artists. It operated briefly as a booking agency until filing its application in compliance with article 5154a making it a trade union in 1994. In 1995 the new constitution was ratified in San Antonio, TX, the NCN was granted non-profit status, and the first election was held. In 2005, the NCN was changed into a non-profit, unincorporated association.

The association boasts some of the most recognizable names in the industry as members and friends of the NCN. Jack Davis, Sergio Aragones, Mort Drucker and Tom Richmond of Mad Magazine, Jan Op De Beeck, Maria Bolton, Sam Norkin, Rudy Cristiano, Bruce Blitz, C. F. Payne, Pancho Willmarth, Mike Peters, Steve Silver and Sebastian Krüger have all been keynote speakers and/or members. Many NCN members are accomplished as artists not only in caricaturing, but in other artistic fields as well.

The NCN officially changed its name to the International Society of Caricature Artists in 2009 to better reflect its international growth and presence. As of 2010 it has over 600 members worldwide. In recent years the International Society of Caricature Artists annual convention has featured guests of honor such as Sam Viviano, Dan Adel, Tom Richmond, Hermann Mejia, Mark Fredrickson, Bill Plympton, Maria Picassó i Piquer and Lindsey Olivares of The Mitchells vs. The Machines.

Due to the Pandemic, in 2020 the ISCA Convention was held only virtually on the online platform Discord.

In 2021, ISCA celebrated its 30th anniversary in Las Vegas.

== Golden Nosey Winners ==
Every year at the ISCA Convention (ISCAcon), all of the participants vote for the best caricature artist of the year, upon several other categories, and award the Golden Nosey:

- Dave Smith (1992)
- Kris Vincenio (1993)
- Eiichi Miyamoto (1994)
- Debbie Schafer (1995)
- Tomoko Ogawara (1996)
- Dave Washburn (1997)
- Tom Richmond (1998)
- Tom Richmond (1999)
- Dino Casterline (2000)
- Stephen Silver (2001)
- Paul Gaunt (2002)
- Joe Bluhm (2003)
- Roger Hurtado (2004)
- Court Jones (2005)
- Chris Rommel (2006)
- Kage Nakanishi (2007)
- Jason Seiler (2008)
- Glenn Ferguson (2009)
- Yuta Honma (2010)
- Tomokazu Tabata (2011)
- Taka Watanabe (2012)
- Kosuke Miyagi (2013)
- Toru Tanaka (2014)
- Grigor Eftimov (2015)
- Dai Tamura (2016)
- Manny Avetisyan (2017)
- Daniel Stieglitz (2018)
- Sebastian Martin (2019)
- Hitomi Ishihara (2021)
- Sebastian Martin (2022)
- Kev Jackson (2023)
- Emerson Boca (2024)
