= Jan Op De Beeck =

Belgian artist

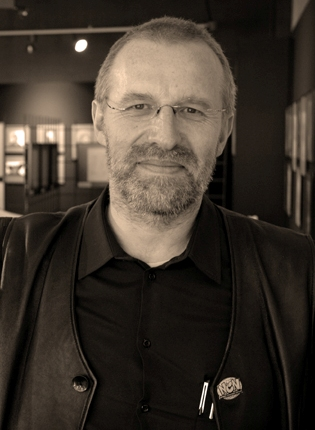
Jan Op De Beeck, 2008

Jan Op De Beeck (born 1958 in Congo) is a famous Belgian caricature artist. He was born in the Congo and moved to Belgium in 1960. He obtained a mastership in 1979 at Sint-Thomas in Brussels and graduated in model drawing at the Royal Academy in Mechelen. He started teaching arts in 1979 at the Coloma Institute in Mechelen.

He has given many workshops and master classes worldwide for professional caricature artists and was invited to many conventions as star guest and keynote speaker.

Among others:

- 2001, together with Sebastian Krüger, master class in Portugal
- Master classes and workshops at multiple ISCA conventions and at Eurocon 2013 in Vienna.

== Publications ==
- Bekketrekkers uit Belgenland (1989)
- Het Laatste Testament der Belgen (The Last Testament of the Belgians, 1993)
- De Kunst van de Karikatuur (The Art of Caricature, L'art de la caricature, 肖像漫画的艺术, 1996, published in Dutch and French, translated into Korean and Mandarin)
- Famous Corpses (Co-authoring with Danielle Griffith and Emi Sato, 2006)
- Sketching is Fun! 1 & 2 (2010)

== Awards ==
Jan Op De Beeck has won numerous international awards, including

- 1st Place of Best Traditional Art (Caricature) at the Eurocature 2017
- “Honorary Master” at the National Caricaturist Network
- "Master of the Year” in 2006 and 2012 at the National Caricaturist Network
- "Portfolio of the Year" in 2006 and 2007 at the National Caricaturist Network
- Many first places at ISCA conventions, in different categories
- 2003 “World’s Best Caricaturist” at the cartoon festival in Iran
- (?) Place at the Global Caricature Exhibition in Seoul, Korea

== Sources ==
- Official web site biography
- European Cartoon Center in Belgium
