= Rustow =

Rustow may refer to:

- Rustów, village in Poland
- Rüstow, surname
