= Steiglitz =

Steiglitz may refer to:

- Steiglitz, Queensland
- Steiglitz, Victoria
- Stieglitz, the former German name of Siedlisko, Greater Poland Voivodeship, Poland.

== See also ==
- Stieglitz (disambiguation)
- Stiglitz (disambiguation)
