= 1953 Menzengraben mining accident =

Mining disaster in East Germany

Coordinates: 50.7928°N 10.0998°E

The Menzengraben mining accident was the explosion of a large pocket of carbon dioxide in a salt mine in Menzengraben, East Germany, on 7 July 1953.

During a planned, nightly explosives detonation in the mine, an unusually large pocket of pressurized carbon dioxide was suddenly released, resulting in the ejection of large blocks of salt through the mine shaft at very high velocities.

The expanding gas as well as the blocks of salt demolished the building above the mine shaft, resulting in blocks of concrete being ejected as well.

Three died as a consequence, one from being hit by debris, two from asphyxiation.
