= Cäsar Rüstow =

Prussian soldier and military writer (1826-1866)

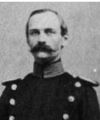
- Born: 18 June 1826; Brandenburg an der Havel, Kingdom of Prussia
- Died: 6 July 1866 (aged 40) Dermbach, Kingdom of Prussia
- Conflicts: Austro-Prussian War: Battle of Dermbach

Cäsar Rüstow (18 June 1826 – 4 July 1866) was a Prussian soldier and military writer.

Rüstow was born in Brandenburg on 18 June 1826. He joined the 32nd Infantry Regiment on 10 August 1843 and on 20 September was commissioned as a second lieutenant. On 7 July 1853 he was promoted to first lieutenant and on 14 September 1858 to captain. He later served on the general staff and was a major with the 1st Army Corps from 22 September 1863 and saw action in the 1864 Second Schleswig War. On 3 April 1866 he became commander of a battalion of the 15th Infantry Regiment. He was killed by gunfire during the Austro-Prussian War while riding at the head of his battalion near Dermbach on 4 July 1866.

The brother of Wilhelm Rüstow and Alexander Rüstow, Cäsar Rüstow was one of the foremost experts of his time in the design and construction of military rifles, and the writer of several treatises on that subject, notably Die Kriegshandfeuerwaffen (Berlin, 1857–64). Both Alexander and Cäsar fell on the field of battle in the war of 1866, Cäsar at the Battle of Dermbach. He was the grandfather of the sociologist Alexander Rüstow.

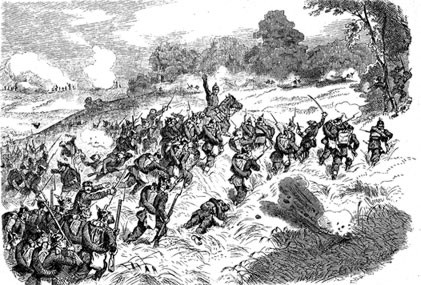
Cäsar Rüstow leading an attack on the horse 1866

== Works ==
- Leitfaden der Waffenlehre, Erfurt, 1855, New Edition: Sommer, Anton; 2006 (ISBN 3902539402)
- Das Miniegewehr, Erfurt, 1855
- Die Kriegshandfeuerwaffen Berlin 1857–1864, 2 Vol.
- Rückblicke auf Preußens Gewehränderung nach Minieschem System, Erfurt, 1857
- Die neueren gezogenen Infanteriegewehre: Ihre wahre Leistungsfähigkeit und die Mittel, dieselbe zu sichern. 2nd edition, Verlag Zernin, Darmstadt, 1862
