= Alexander Rüstow (soldier) =

Prussian soldier and military writer

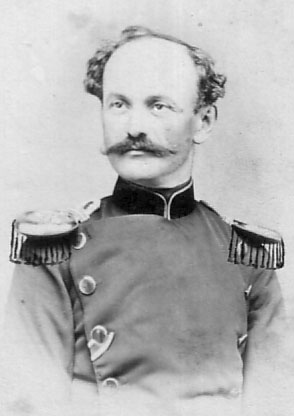
- Born: 13 October 1824; Brandenburg, Kingdom of Prussia
- Died: 25 July 1866 (aged 41)
- Relatives: Wilhelm Rüstow (brother); Cäsar Rüstow (brother)
- Military career
- Allegiance: Prussia
- Branch: Prussian Army
- Conflicts: Austro-Prussian War

Alexander Rüstow (13 October 1824 – 25 July 1866) was a Prussian soldier and military writer from Brandenburg an der Havel. The brother of Wilhelm Rüstow and Cäsar Rüstow, he is remembered for his work Der Küstenkrieg (Berlin, 1848). Alexander and Cäsar both fell on the field of battle during the 1866 Austro-Prussian War, with Alexander dying at Horitz from wounds sustained in the Battle of Königgrätz.

== Literature ==
- Meyers Lexikon. 1896, Bibliographisches Institut, Leipzig Wien 1896.
- Allgemeine Deutsche Biographie, 30.Bd. Neudruck der Auflage von 1890, Verlag Duncker und Humblot, 1970 Berlin, S. 37
- Theodor Fontane: Der Feldzug in Böhmen und Mähren 1866. Verlag der Königlichen Geheimen Ober-Hofbuchdruckerei (R. v. Decker), Berlin, 1871
