= Diedorf, Thuringia =

Diedorf
- Ortsteil of Dermbach
- Interactive map of Diedorf
- Location within Germany Location within Thuringia
- Coordinates: 50°39′42″N 10°7′28″E
- Country: Germany
- State: Thuringia
- District: Wartburgkreis
- Municipality: Dermbach

Area
  - Total: 4.76 km^{2} (1.84 sq mi)
- Elevation: 400 m (1,300 ft)

Population (2017-12-31)
  - Total: 345
  - Density: 72.5/km^{2} (188/sq mi)
- Time zone: UTC+01:00 (CET)
  - Summer (DST): UTC+02:00 (CEST)
- Postal codes: 36452
- Dialling codes: 036966
- Vehicle registration: WAK

Diedorf (German pronunciation: [ˈdiːdɔʁf]) is a village and former municipality located in the Wartburgkreis district of Thuringia, Germany. As of 1 January 2019, it has become part of the municipality Dermbach.

The first children's stocking factory in the German Democratic Republic was in Diedorf. The building has been converted to a cultural center called the Alte Strumpffabrik.

The village has a milk filling station.
