= Oechse =

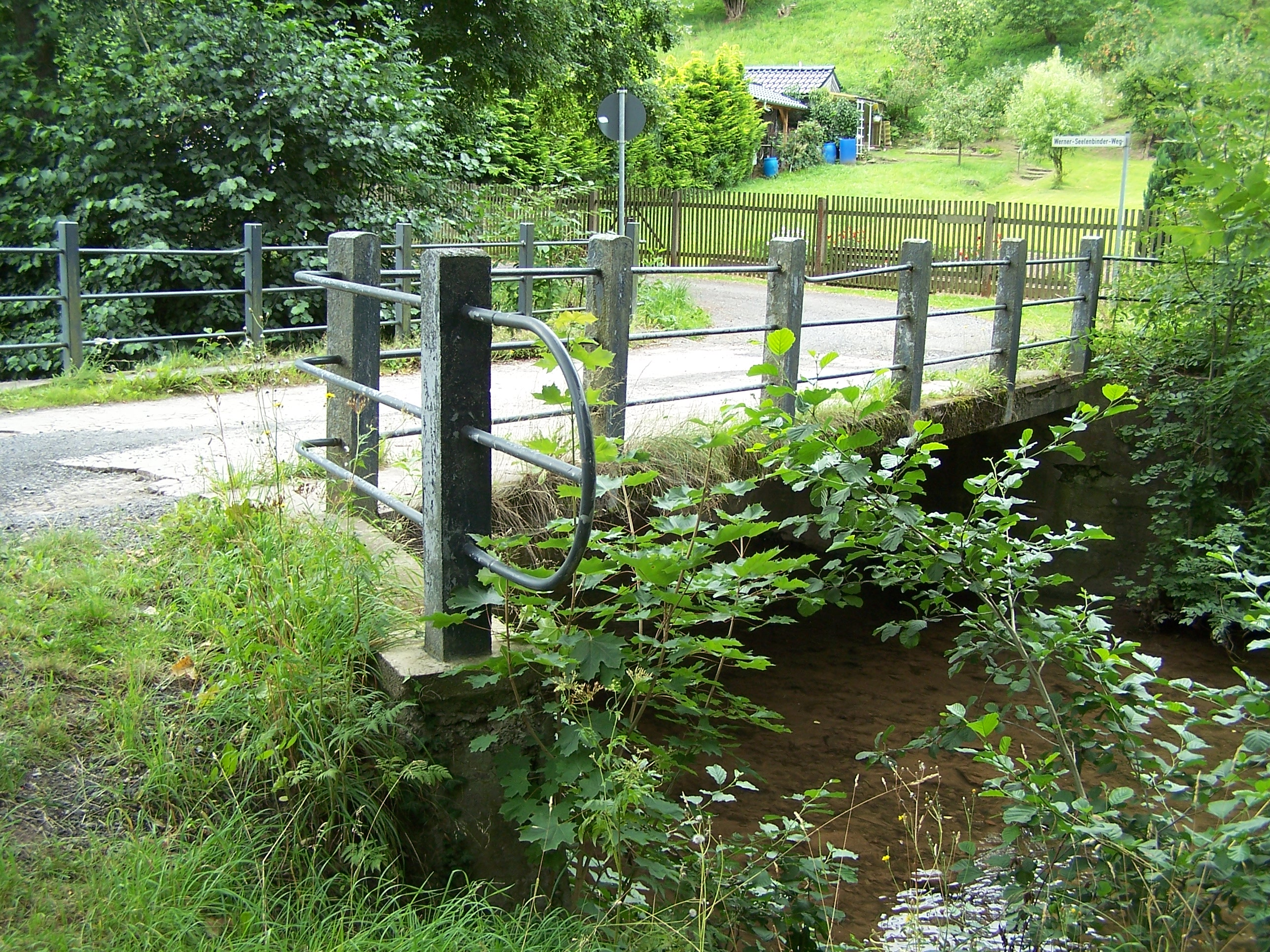

Location
- Country: Germany
- State: Thuringia

Physical characteristics
- Mouth
  - location: Werra
  - coordinates: 50.8315°N 10.0215°E

Basin features
- Progression: Werra→ Weser→ North Sea

Oechse or Öchse is a river of Thuringia, Germany.

The Oechse rises on the western slope of the 714 m high Baier (Rhön Mountains) and flows generally northward through Oechsen and Völkershausen to Vacha, where it flows into the Werra.

== Tributaries ==
The main tributaries of the Oechse are (downstream ordered by mouth location, in parentheses inflow side and length as well as places in the stream course):

- Marbach (left, 4.3 km)
- Geblar (left, 3.4 km; Geblar)
- Black Oechse (right, 2.5 km Gehaus)
- Sünna (left, 8.1 km; Deicheroda, Sünna)

By far the largest and most important tributary is the Sünna that enters in Vacha. The Sünna flows around the mountains Dietrich (669 m) and Oechsen (627 m) in the west, while the Oechse flow around them in the east.

The Marbach, which springs at the western slope of the 721 m high mountain Sachsenburg, is more or less the left headstream and the only other tributary with a basin size larger than 10 km^{2}.

== See also ==
- List of rivers of Thuringia
