= Oechsen =

- Municipality
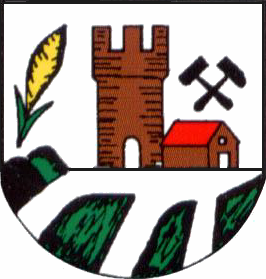
- Coat of arms

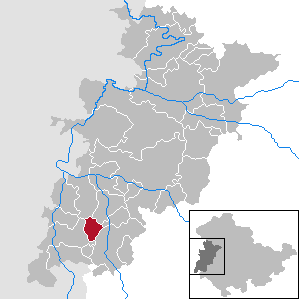
- Location of Oechsen within Wartburgkreis district
- Interactive map of Oechsen
- Location within Germany Location within Thuringia
- Coordinates: 50°45′N 10°4′E
- Country: Germany
- State: Thuringia
- District: Wartburgkreis

Government
  - Mayor (2022–28): Sina Römhild

Area
  - Total: 12.49 km^{2} (4.82 sq mi)
- Elevation: 400 m (1,300 ft)

Population (2025-12-31)
  - Total: 578
  - Density: 46.3/km^{2} (120/sq mi)
- Time zone: UTC+01:00 (CET)
  - Summer (DST): UTC+02:00 (CEST)
- Postal codes: 36404
- Dialling codes: 036965
- Vehicle registration: WAK
- Website: www.oechsen.de

Oechsen is a municipality in the Wartburgkreis district of Thuringia, Germany.

It is located 7 km north west of Dermbach, close to the Baier nature reserve. It takes its name from the Oechse river.

The main landmark is the Lutheran church, dedicated to St Laurence.
