= Stiglitz Commission =

Stiglitz Commission is a short name given for two commissions led by the US economist Joseph E. Stiglitz:

- Commission of Experts on Reforms of the International Monetary and Financial System, convened by the President of the United Nations General Assembly Miguel d'Escoto Brockmann
- Commission on the Measurement of Economic Performance and Social Progress, convened by the French Government
