= Alexander von Stieglitz =

Russian financier (1814–1884)

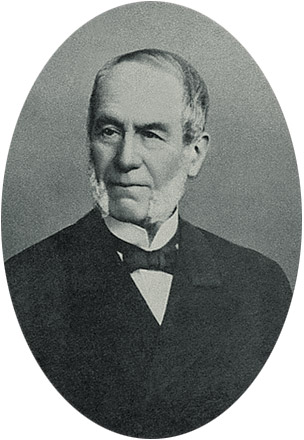
Alexander von Stieglitz

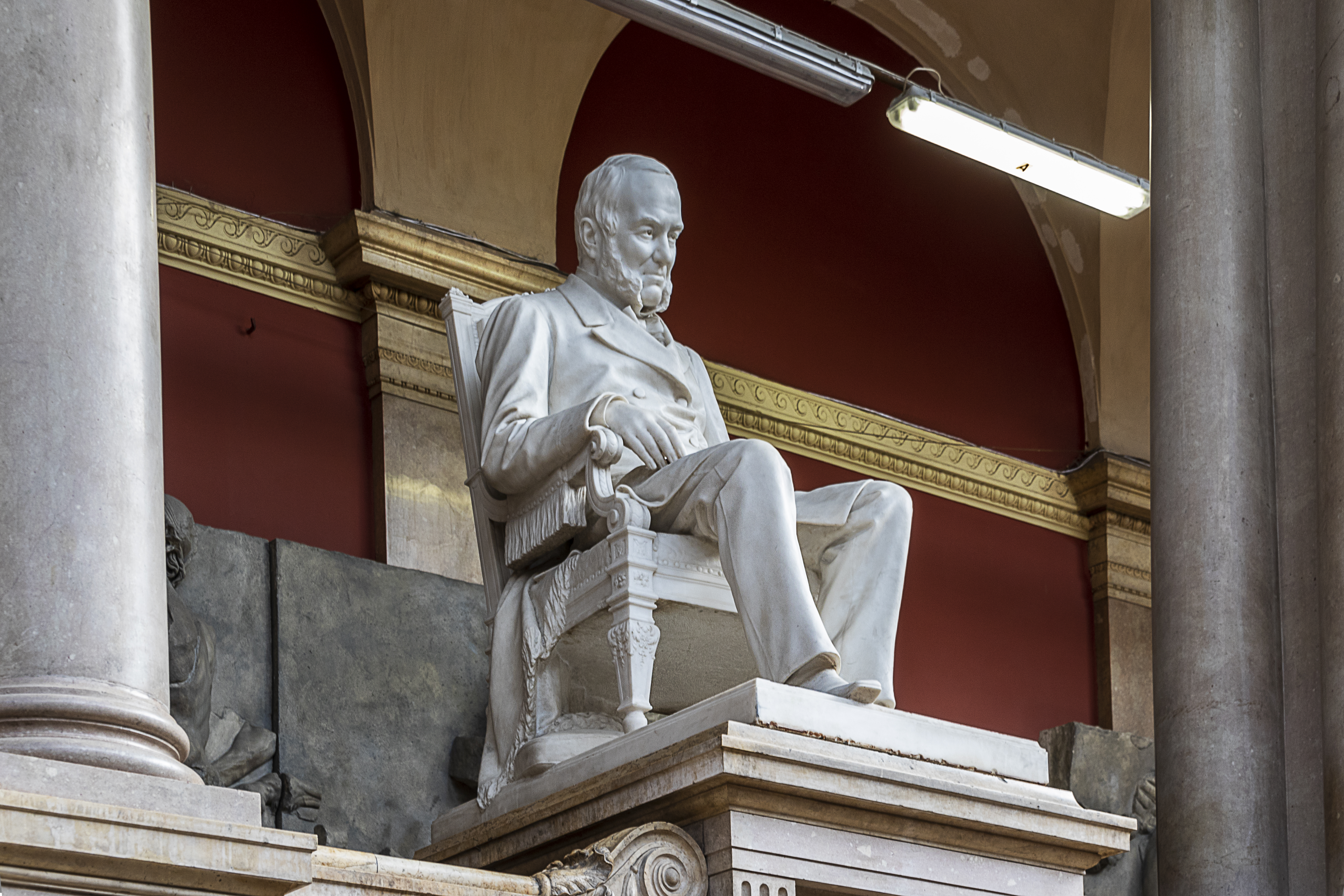
The statue of Stieglitz in the Stieglitz Academy

Baron Alexander von Stieglitz (Russian: Александр Людвигович Штиглиц; 1814–1884) was a Russian financier of Jewish descent. He was the first governor of the State Bank of the Russian Empire, the predecessor organization to today's Central Bank of the Russian Federation.

== Early life and education ==
Stieglitz was born in Saint Petersburg to banker Baron Ludwig von Stieglitz, who was a founder of the banking-house "Stieglitz and Co". After completing his education at the University of Dorpat in what is now Tartu, Estonia, he entered the state services as a member of the Manufacture council of the Ministry of Finances of the Russian Empire.

== Businessman and civil servant ==
After the death of his father, Stieglitz inherited the banking-house and succeeded as a banker of the Emperor. In 1840–1850, he successfully sold six 4% government loans to finance the construction of the Moscow – Saint Petersburg Railway and secured a significant foreign loan at the height of the Crimean War. Stieglitz also owned manufacturing enterprises in Narva and in Catherinehof.

In 1846, Stieglitz was elected the chairman of the Exchange's committee. At that post, he took part in all financial operation of the Government of the Russian Empire. In 1857, he co-founded the Society of the Russian Railways. In 1860, Stieglitz liquidated all his commercial enterprises and voluntarily withdrew from the post of the chairman of the Exchange's committee.

On 31 May 1860, Emperor Alexander II established the State Bank of the Russian Empire and Stieglitz became its first governor. In 1866, he left the state service.

== Philanthropy ==
In 1878, Stieglitz donated funds to build a museum of applied arts for the benefit of students of the Central School of Technical Drawing, which had been established by him earlier.

== Awards ==
Stieglitz received numerous awards, including the Order of St. Stanislav of the 3rd degree, the Order of St. Vladimir of the 4th degree and the Order of St. Anna of the 2nd degree.

Government offices
| New office | Governor of the State Bank of the Russian Empire; 1860–1866 | Succeeded by Yevgeniy Lamanskiy |
