= Brunnhartshausen =

- Ortsteil of Dermbach
- Interactive map of Brunnhartshausen
- Location within Germany Location within Thuringia
- Coordinates: 50°40′30″N 10°5′54″E
- Country: Germany
- State: Thuringia
- District: Wartburgkreis
- Municipality: Dermbach

Area
  - Total: 10.65 km^{2} (4.11 sq mi)
- Elevation: 450 m (1,480 ft)

Population (2017-12-31)
  - Total: 348
  - Density: 32.7/km^{2} (84.6/sq mi)
- Time zone: UTC+01:00 (CET)
  - Summer (DST): UTC+02:00 (CEST)
- Postal codes: 36452
- Dialling codes: 036964
- Vehicle registration: WAK

Brunnhartshausen (pronounced [bʁʊnhaʁtsˈhaʊzn̩]) is a village and a former municipality in the Wartburgkreis district of Thuringia, Germany. Since 1 January 2019, it is part of the municipality Dermbach.
