= Hořice na Šumavě =

- Market town
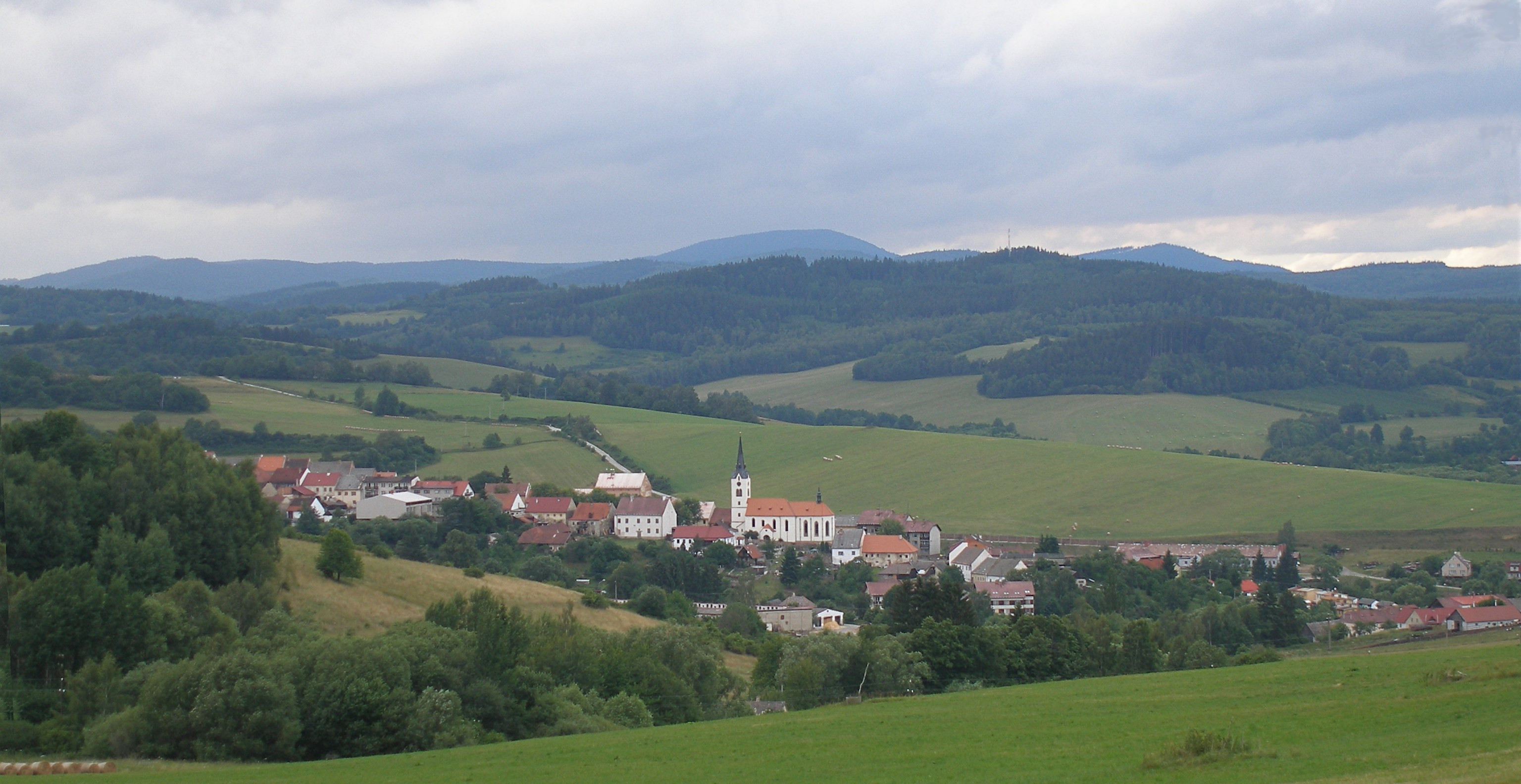
- View from the south

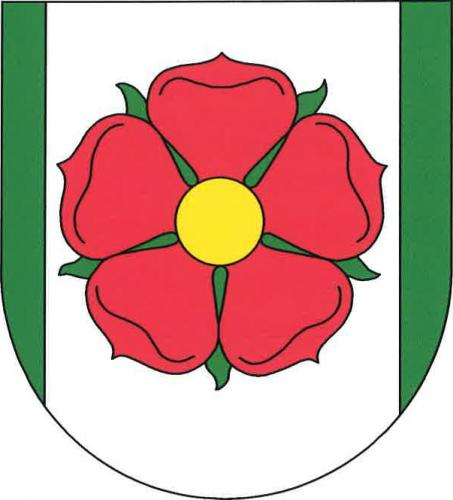
- Flag Coat of arms

- Location in the Czech Republic
- Coordinates: 48°45′58″N 14°10′42″E
- Country: Czech Republic
- Region: South Bohemian
- District: Český Krumlov
- First mentioned: 1272

Area
  - Total: 31.96 km^{2} (12.34 sq mi)
- Elevation: 674 m (2,211 ft)

Population (2026-01-01)
  - Total: 913
  - Density: 28.6/km^{2} (74.0/sq mi)
- Time zone: UTC+1 (CET)
  - Summer (DST): UTC+2 (CEST)
- Postal code: 382 22
- Website: www.horicenasumave.cz

Hořice na Šumavě (Czech pronunciation: [ˈɦor̝ɪtsɛ ˈna ʃumavjɛ]; German: Höritz) is a market town in Český Krumlov District in the South Bohemian Region of the Czech Republic. It has about 900 inhabitants. The historic centre is well preserved and is protected as an urban monument zone.

== Administrative division ==
Hořice na Šumavě consists of six municipal parts (in brackets population according to the 2021 census):

- Hořice na Šumavě (671)
- Mýto (57)
- Provodice (0)
- Šebanov (45)
- Skláře (37)
- Stěžerov (6)

== Etymology ==
The name Hořice is probably derived from the surname Hora, meaning "the village of Hora's people", but it could be also derived from the word hořice, which is an Old Czech diminutive form of hora (i.e. 'mountain').

== Geography ==
Hořice na Šumavě is located about 11 kilometres (7 mi) southwest of Český Krumlov and 31 km (19 mi) southwest of České Budějovice. It lies in the Bohemian Forest Foothills. The highest point is the mountain Nad Skalným at 880 m (2,887 ft) above sea level.

== History ==
The first written mention of Hořice na Šumavě is from 1272. From 1290, it was property of the Vyšší Brod Monastery. In 1375, it was promoted to a market town. For most of its history, it had German majority. After World War II, the German-speaking population was expelled and the market town was repopulated by Czech settlers.

== Demographics ==
Historical population

Year	Pop.	±%
1869	2,218	—
1880	2,350	+6.0%
1890	2,222	−5.4%
1900	2,431	+9.4%
1910	2,441	+0.4%

Year	Pop.	±%
1921	2,268	−7.1%
1930	2,511	+10.7%
1950	820	−67.3%
1961	726	−11.5%
1970	707	−2.6%

Year	Pop.	±%
1980	716	+1.3%
1991	717	+0.1%
2001	800	+11.6%
2011	782	−2.2%
2021	816	+4.3%

Source: Censuses

== Transport ==
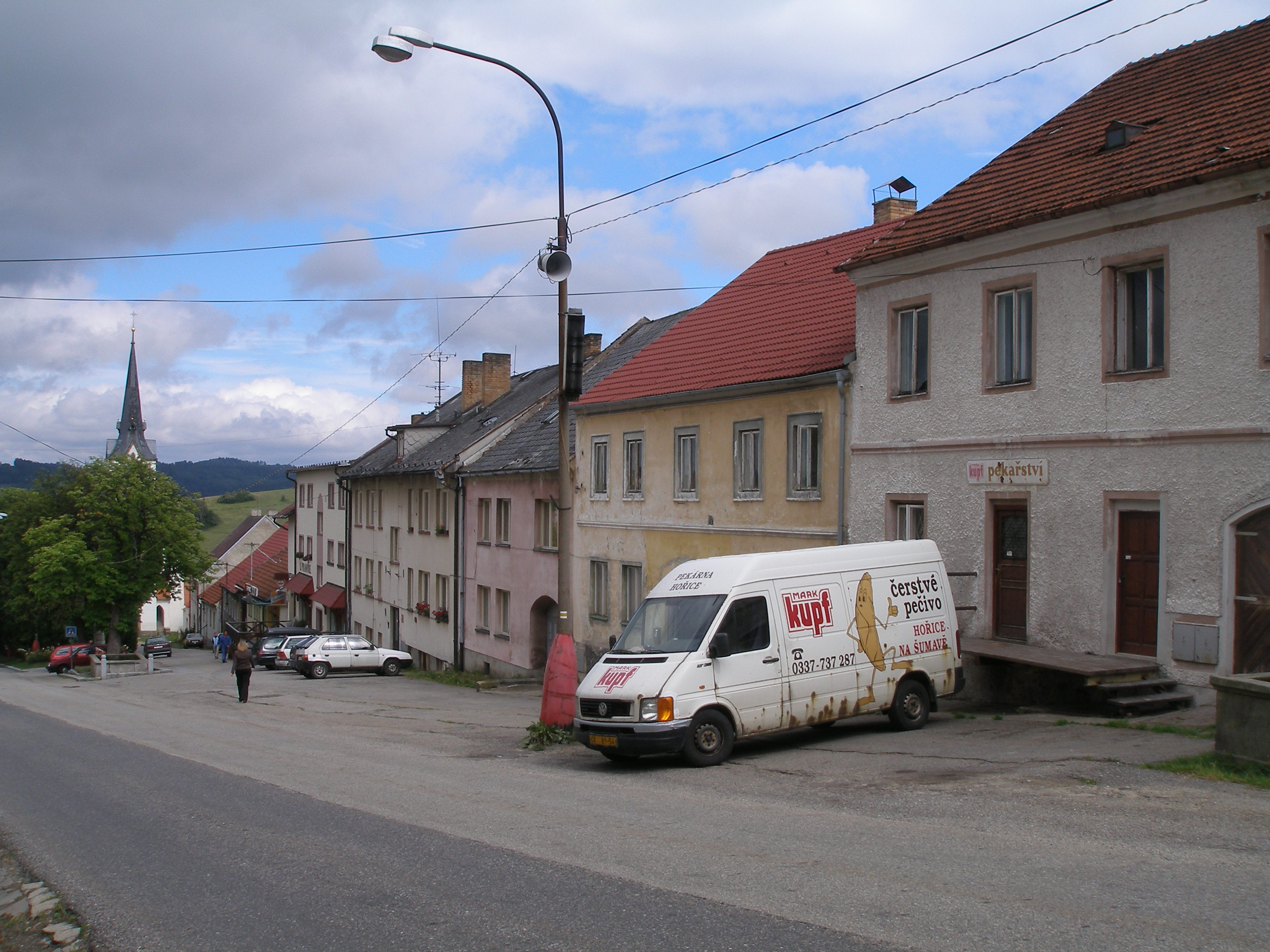
Southern part of the square

The I/39 road (the section from Český Krumlov to Volary) runs through the market town.

Hořice na Šumavě is located on the railway line České Budějovice–Nové Údolí.

== Culture ==
The most important event of local traditions are Hořice Passion Plays. Their origins date back to the 13th century and their modern history started in 1816. They were renewed in 1992. In 1897, the play was filmed and became one of the two earliest films about Jesus.

== Sights ==
The main landmark of the historic centre is Church of Saint Catherine. It was built in 1483–1510 and replaced an old Romanesque church.

There are many preserved historical houses protected as cultural monuments. Along the main road and the common there is a system of seven stone fountains, which served to supply the population with drinking water. The middle one is decorated by a statue of Saint John of Nepomuk. On the square is also a pillory from 1549.
