= Wilhelm Rüstow =

Prussian-born Swiss soldier and military writer (1821–1878)

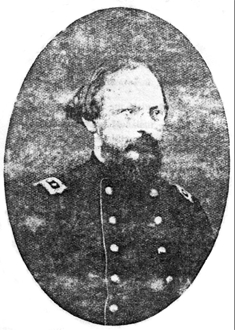
Friedrich Wilhelm Rüstow.

Friedrich Wilhelm Rüstow (25 May 1821 – 14 August 1878) was a Prussian-born Swiss soldier and military writer.

Rüstow was born in Brandenburg an der Havel in the Province of Brandenburg. He entered the Prussian Army and served for some years, until the publication of Der deutsche Militärstaat vor und während der Revolution (Zürich, 1850). Rüstow participated in the Revolution of 1848. He was sentenced by a court-martial to 32½ years of fortress imprisonment, but succeeded in escaping to Switzerland, where he obtained a military posting. By 1857 he was a major on the engineer staff.

Three years later Rüstow accompanied Giuseppe Garibaldi in the famous expedition against the Two Sicilies as colonel and Chief of staff, and to him must be ascribed the victories of Capua (10 September 1860) and Volturno (1 October 1860). At the end of the campaign he settled down in Zürich. At the outbreak of the 1870 Franco-Prussian War, he offered his services to Prussia, but was rejected. In 1878, on the foundation of a military professorship at Zürich, Rüstow applied for the post, but taught only short, and, on its being given finally to another officer (Emil Rothpletz), lost heart and committed suicide at Aussersihl near Zürich.

Two of Rüstow's younger brothers were distinguished Prussian soldiers, Alexander Rüstow and Cäsar Rüstow. He was also the great-uncle of the sociologist Alexander Rüstow.

== Works ==
Amongst Rüstow's works, which covered nearly every branch of the military art, a large number must be mentioned.

=== Historical ===
- Heerwesen und Kriegführung Julius Cäsars (Gotha, 1855; 2nd ed., Nordhausen, 1862)
- Kommentar zu Napoleon III's Geschichte Julius Cäsars (Stuttgart, 1865–67)
- Geschichte des griechischen Kriegswesens (in collaboration with Hermann Köchly, Aarau, 1852)
- Militar. Biographen (David, Xenophon, Montluc) (Zürich, 1858)
- Geschichte der Infanterie (Gotha, 1857–58; 3rd ed., 1884)
- Die ersten Feldzüge Napoleon Bonapartes in Italien und Deutschland 1796 und 1797. Zürich, Schultheß, 1867. at Google Books
- Der Krieg von 1805 in Deutschland und Italien (Frauenfeld, 1854)
- Geschichte des ungarischen Revolutionskrieges in den Jahren 1848 und 1849. Vol 1, Zürich, Schultheß, 1860. Digitized by the Bavarian State Library
- reminiscences of 1860 in Italy (Leipzig, 1861)
- monograph on the campaigns of 1848–49 in Italy (Zürich, 1849)
- monograph on the Crimean War (Zürich, 1855–56).

=== Critical and general ===
- Allgemeine Taktik (Zürich, 1858; 2nd ed., 1868)
- Kriegspolitik und Kriegsgebrauch (Zürich, 1876)
- Militär-Handwörterbuch (Zürich, 1859)
- Die Feldherrenkunst des 19. Jahrhunderts (Zürich, 1857; 3rd ed., 1878–79)
- French edition: L'art militaire au XIXe siècle: études stratégiques et tactiques sur les guerres les plus récentes. 3 Bände, Paris, Dumaine 1875–1880.
- Der Krieg und seine Mittel (Leipzig, 1856).

He also wrote Annalen des Königreichs Italien (Zürich, 1862–63). See Zernim, "F. W. Rüstow," in Unsere Zeit. vol. 2 (Leipzig, 1882).
