= Ludwig von Stieglitz =

German Jewish businessman

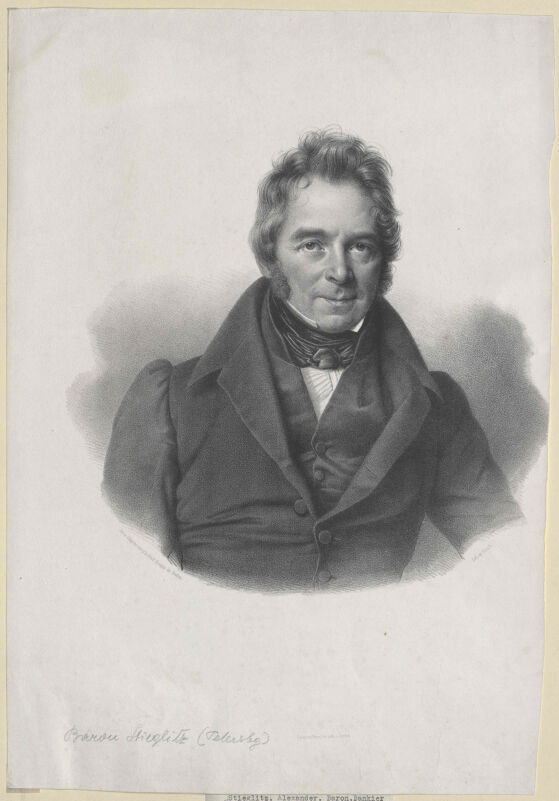
Ludwig von Stieglitz.

Ludwig von Stieglitz (Любим Иванович Штиглиц; born December 24, 1779, in Arolsen, Waldeck, Holy Roman Empire of the German Nation; 18 March [O.S. 6 March] 1843, Saint Petersburg) was a German Jewish businessman in Russia and founder of the banking house Stieglitz & Company.

He was the youngest of three sons of the Waldeck court banker Hirsch Bernhard Stieglitz and his wife Edel Elisabeth (née Marcus). As a young man, Stieglitz moved to Russia as a representative of his merchant house, and eventually, after converting to Lutheran Christianity, was appointed court banker to Alexander I of Russia, gaining influence and receiving various Russian decorations. After adopting Christianity, he was raised to the dignity of a Russian hereditary baron on August 22, 1826.

Stieglitz continued as court banker to Nicholas I and took an active part in many financial affairs of his adopted country, investing in a range of enterprises including steam navigation between Lübeck and St. Petersburg. He purchased the Estate of Gross-Essern in Courland, and on May 3, 1840 his name was inscribed in the register of the nobility of Courland.

A contemporary has noted: "He was the German Rothschild of St. Petersburg, but in reality more; for he was not only rich in money, he was still richer in heart, and a noble benefactor in the best sense of the word."

== Personal life ==
Ludwig von Stieglitz married Amalie Angelika Christiane Gottschalk (July 26, 1777, Hannover – February 20, 1838, St. Petersburg); their descendants were confirmed in the dignity of hereditary barons by the Senate on April 3, 1862:

- Son Alexander was his successor as head of the bank (until the firm went into voluntary liquidation in 1863) and became head of the State Bank of the Russian Empire established in 1860.
- Daughter Nathalie (October 17, 1805, St. Petersburg – May 17, 1882, Frankfurt). She married in 1824 Johann David von Harder (1797–1871), Consul General of the Netherlands.
