= Alexander Rüstow =

German sociologist and economist (1885–1963)

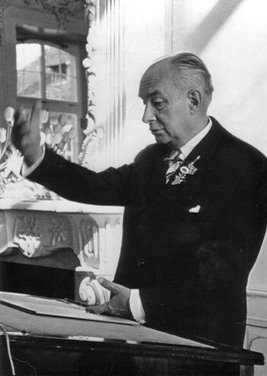
- Rüstow c. 1960
- Born: 8 April 1885; Wiesbaden, German Empire
- Died: 30 June 1963 (aged 78); Heidelberg, West Germany

Academic background
- Doctoral advisors: Paul Hensel
- Influences: Parmenides · Oppenheimer

Academic work
- Discipline: Macroeconomics
- School or tradition: Ordoliberalism; Neoliberalism
- Notable ideas: Social market economy

Alexander Rüstow (8 April 1885 – 30 June 1963) was a German sociologist and economist. At the Colloque Walter Lippmann in August 1938 he popularised the term "neoliberalism". He became one of the fathers of the "Social Market Economy" that shaped the economy of West Germany after World War II. Rüstow was the grandnephew of Wilhelm Rüstow, the grandson of Cäsar Rüstow and the father of Dankwart Rustow.

== Life ==
Rüstow was born in Wiesbaden in the Prussian Province of Hesse-Nassau in to the family of a Prussian military officer. From 1903 till 1908, he studied mathematics, physics, philosophy, philology, law and economics, at the universities of Göttingen, Munich and Berlin. In 1908, he obtained his doctorate under Paul Hensel, at the University of Erlangen, on a philosophical topic, Russell's paradox. He then worked at the Teubner publishing house in Berlin, until 1911, when he started working on his habilitation, on the knowledge theory of Parmenides. He had to interrupt his work though at the outbreak of the First World War, when he volunteered for the German Army.

After the war, Rüstow, then still a socialist, participated in the November Revolution, and obtained a post at the Ministry of Economic Affairs, working on the nationalization process of the coal industry in the Ruhr Area. Disillusioned with socialist planning, he started working for the VdMA, the German Engineering Federation in 1924. The engineering companies in Germany suffered much by the protected and subsidized coal and mine industry.

In the 1930s, the climate in Germany became too unfriendly for Rüstow; he was blacklisted in 1933 and fled to Switzerland, where he was offered a chair in economic geography and history at the University of Istanbul, Turkey. In Istanbul, he worked on his magnum opus, Ortsbestimmung der Gegenwart (in English published as Freedom and Domination), a critique of civilization. In 1938 at the Colloque Walter Lippmann, it was Rüstow who created the term 'neoliberalism' to separate new liberalism from classical liberalism. Rüstow promoted the concept of the social market economy, and this concept promotes a strong role for the state with respect to the market, which is in many ways different from the ideas which are nowadays connected with the term neoliberalism.

In 1949, Rüstow returned to Germany and obtained a chair at the University of Heidelberg, where he remained until his retirement in 1956. He died in 1963 at age 78 in Heidelberg.

== Ordoliberalism ==
Together with Walter Eucken, Wilhelm Röpke and Franz Böhm, Rüstow provided the necessary foundational work of Ordoliberalism.

== Work ==
- Der Lügner. Theorie, Geschichte und Auflösung des Russellschen Paradoxons, 1910 (thesis)
- Schutzzoll oder Freihandel?, 1925
- Das Für und Wider der Schutzzollpolitik, 1925
- Das Versagen des Wirtschaftsliberalismus, 1945, Republished in 2001, ISBN 3-89518-349-0
- Zwischen Kapitalismus und Kommunismus, 1949
- Das Versagen des Wirtschaftsliberalismus, 2nd edition, 1950
- Ortsbestimmung der Gegenwart. Eine universalgeschichtliche Kulturkritik, ("Determination of the Present's Location"), 3 Volumes, 1950–1957
  - Volume 1: Ursprung der Herrschaft ("Origin of Rule")
  - Volume 2: Weg der Freiheit ("March of Freedom")
  - Volume 3: Herrschaft oder Freiheit? ("Rule or Freedom")
- Wirtschaft und Kultursystem, 1955
- Die Kehrseite des Wirtschaftswunders, 1961
