= Dankwart Rustow =

American political scientist (1924–1996)

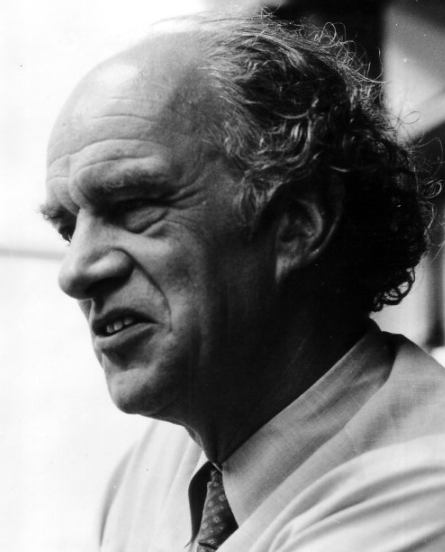
- Born: Dankwart Alexander Rustow; December 21, 1924; Berlin, Weimar Republic
- Died: August 3, 1996 (aged 71); Manhattan, New York City, U.S.
- Education: Harvard University; Yale University
- Scientific career
- Fields: Political Science and Sociology
- Workplaces: Harvard University; CUNY Graduate Center

Dankwart Alexander Rustow (December 21, 1924 – August 3, 1996) was a professor of political science and sociology specializing in comparative politics. He is prominent for his research on democratization. In his seminal 1970 article 'Transitions to Democracy: Toward a Dynamic Model,' Rustow broke from the prevailing schools of thought on how countries became democratic. Disagreeing with the heavy focus on necessary social and economic pre-conditions for democracy, he argued that national unity was the necessary precondition for democracy.

== Life and career ==
Rustow was born in 1924 in Berlin. From 1933 until 1938, he was a student at the Odenwaldschule in Heppenheim, Germany. He then moved to Istanbul/Turkey, where his father Alexander Rüstow had fled in 1933. He graduated from Queens College and received a PhD in political science in 1951 from Yale. He taught for one year at Oglethorpe College outside Atlanta, then at Princeton and Columbia, and finally at the Graduate Center of the City University of New York (CUNY) for 25 years. He retired in June 1995 as distinguished professor of political science and sociology. He was a visiting professor at Harvard and other institutions, a vice president of the Middle East Studies Association of North America and the recipient of a Guggenheim fellowship.

He died in the Memorial Sloan-Kettering Cancer Center in Manhattan in August 1996. The cause was non-Hodgkin's lymphoma. He was 71 and lived on the Upper West Side. His marriages to Rachel Aubrey Rustow, a daughter of Adolph Lowe, and Tamar Gottlieb Rustow ended in divorce. In addition to his son Timothy of Manhattan, he is survived by his wife of 18 years, Dr. Margrit Wreschner, a psychoanalyst; another son, Stephen of Manhattan; two daughters, Janet of Cambridge, Mass., and Marina of Manhattan; three grandchildren; two sisters, Maria Funk, and Friedburg Lorenz (died in 2007); a half-brother, Helmut – all of them of Heppenheim, Germany; and his stepmother, Lorena (died in 1999) of Heidelberg, Germany.

== Major contributions ==
Dankwart Rustow argued that the modernizationists, such as Seymour Lipset, asked a functional question: what can enhance or preserve the health of a democracy? Rustow thought the question of transition from authoritarianism was a much more interesting one: how does a democracy come into being in the first place?

Using Turkey and Sweden as his case studies, he sketched a general route through which countries travel during democratization. This had four phases:

- National unity: The formation of an uncontested sense of nationhood (among the "vast majority of citizens") was a necessary precondition. Before people could decide how to rule, there must be clarity on who 'the people' are.
- A prolonged and inconclusive political struggle: This occurs differently in all countries, but is typically centered around the emerging power of a new social force (i.e. a manufacturing elite). Democracy is eventually born of this conflict. It is thus not a ‘rosy love-in,’ but can be violent and bloody. This struggle can be so intense as to lead to the dominance of one group and the closing of doors to democratization. When this political struggle reaches stalemate, a window of opportunity opens up for democratization.
- Decision phase: When the conflicting parties realise that they are at a point of stalemate in their inconclusive political struggle they decide to compromise and adopt democratic forms of rule. For Rustow, there is always a conscious decision on the part of elites to adopt democratic rules.
- Habituation phase: Gradually the rules of democracy become a habit.

His work laid the conceptual foundations for the later work of scholars known as 'transitologists.' Studying the decline in authoritarianism in Latin America and Southern Europe in the 1970s and 1980s, scholars such as Larry Diamond, Lawrence Whitehead, and Philip Schmitter explained transitions from authoritarianism not in terms of socio-economic or structural changes, but rather in terms of consensus and pacts between elites. The impetus for change comes not from international or socio-economic changes, but from splits within a ruling regime.

Rustow's model of democratization was criticized by Adam Przeworski. Michael McFaul argued that post-Cold War Russia supported Rustow's argument that national unity was a precondition for successful democratization.

A 1997 special issue of Comparative Politics and the 1999 edited collection Transitions to Democracy (edited by Lisa Anderson) focused on Rustow's work.

== Works ==
- Political development: the vanishing dream of stability. 1962.
- Military in Middle Eastern Society and politics. 1963
- (ed. with Robert E. Ward) Political modernaization in Japan and Turkey. 1964.
- World of nations. 1967.
- Politics of compromise: a study of parties and cabinet government in Sweden. 1969.
- Transitions to democracy: Toward a dynamic model. 1970.
- (ed.) Philosophers and Kings: Studies in leadership. 1970.
- American foreign policy in international perspective. 1971.
- (ed. with Ernst-Otto Czempiel) Euro-American system: economic and political relations between North America and Western Europe. 1971.
- Freedom and Domination: A Historical Critique of Civilization. 1971
- Middle Eastern political systems. 1971.
- (with John F. Mugno) OPEC, success and prospects. 1977.
- (with Trevor Penrose) Mediterranean challenge. no.5, Turkey and the Community. 1981.
- Oil and turmoil: America faces OPEC and the Middle East. 1982.
- Turkey, America's forgotten ally. 1987.
- (ed. with Kenneth Paul Erickson) Comparative political dynamics: global research perspectives. 1991.
