= Urnshausen =

- Ortsteil of Dermbach
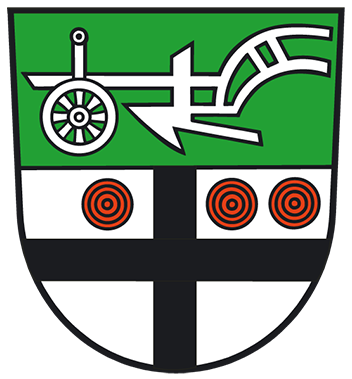
- Coat of arms
- Interactive map of Urnshausen
- Location within Germany Location within Thuringia
- Coordinates: 50°44′N 10°11′E
- Country: Germany
- State: Thuringia
- District: Wartburgkreis
- Municipality: Dermbach

Area
  - Total: 15.99 km^{2} (6.17 sq mi)
- Elevation: 330 m (1,080 ft)

Population (2017-12-31)
  - Total: 708
  - Density: 44.3/km^{2} (115/sq mi)
- Time zone: UTC+01:00 (CET)
  - Summer (DST): UTC+02:00 (CEST)
- Postal codes: 36457
- Dialling codes: 036964

Urnshausen (German pronunciation: [ʊʁnsˈhaʊzn̩]) is a village and a former municipality in the Wartburgkreis district of Thuringia, Germany. Since 1 January 2019, it is part of the municipality Dermbach.
