= Wiesenthal =

- Municipality
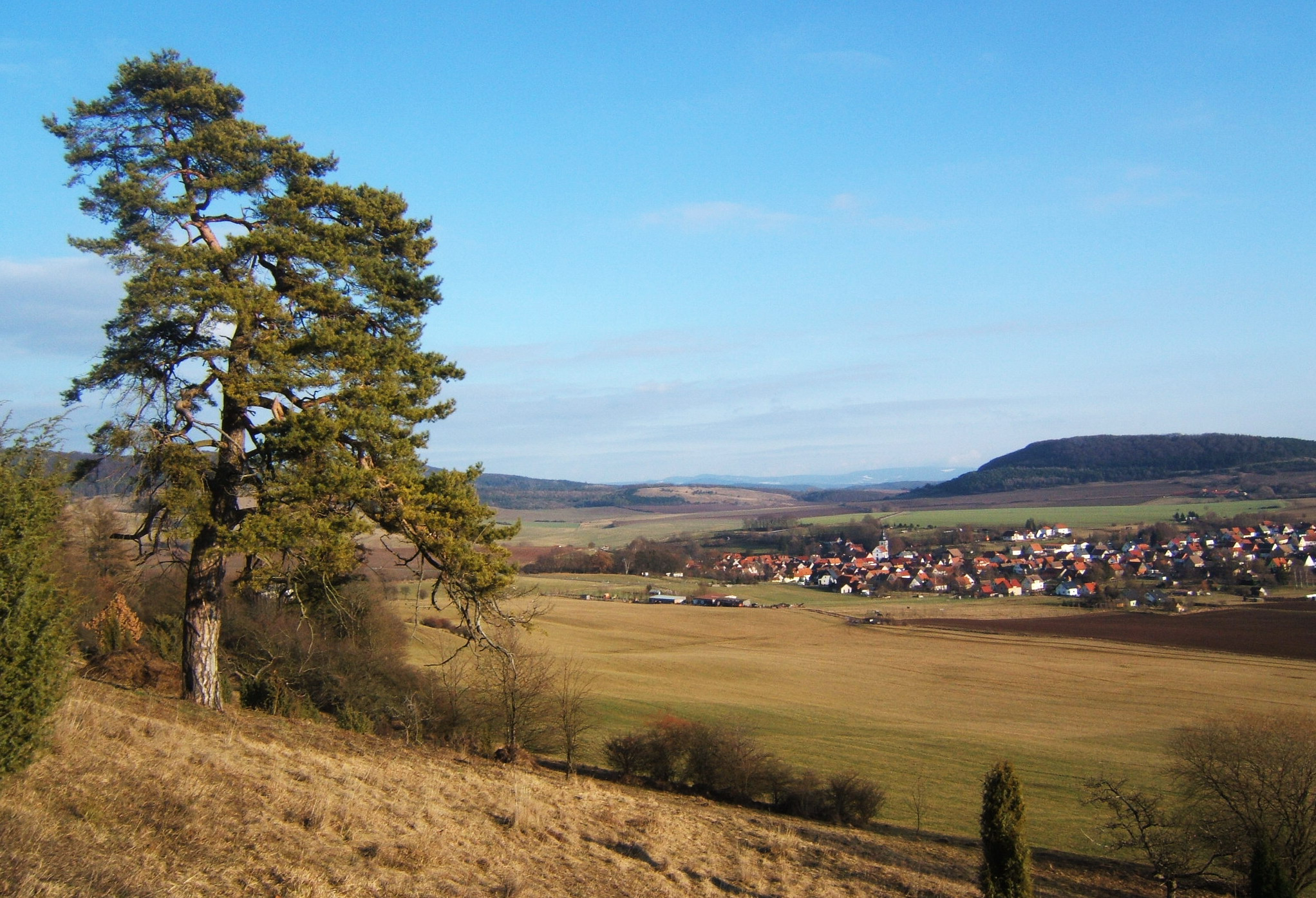
- General view of Wiesenthal

- Coat of arms

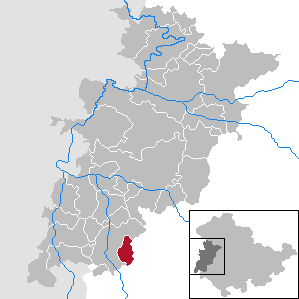
- Location of Wiesenthal within Wartburgkreis district
- Interactive map of Wiesenthal
- Location within Germany Location within Thuringia
- Coordinates: 50°42′N 10°10′E
- Country: Germany
- State: Thuringia
- District: Wartburgkreis

Government
  - Mayor (2022–28): Sven Hollenbach

Area
  - Total: 13.63 km^{2} (5.26 sq mi)
- Elevation: 380 m (1,250 ft)

Population (2025-12-31)
  - Total: 703
  - Density: 51.6/km^{2} (134/sq mi)
- Time zone: UTC+01:00 (CET)
  - Summer (DST): UTC+02:00 (CEST)
- Postal codes: 36466
- Dialling codes: 036964
- Vehicle registration: WAK
- Website: www.wiesenthal.info

Wiesenthal (German pronunciation: [ˈviːzn̩taːl], lit. 'meadow valley') is a municipality in the Wartburgkreis district of Thuringia, Germany.
