= Zella/Rhön =

- Ortsteil of Dermbach
- Interactive map of Zella/Rhön
- Location within Germany Location within Thuringia
- Coordinates: 50°40′N 10°7′E
- Country: Germany
- State: Thuringia
- District: Wartburgkreis
- Municipality: Dermbach

Area
  - Total: 1.72 km^{2} (0.66 sq mi)
- Elevation: 399 m (1,309 ft)

Population (2017-12-31)
  - Total: 412
  - Density: 240/km^{2} (620/sq mi)
- Time zone: UTC+01:00 (CET)
  - Summer (DST): UTC+02:00 (CEST)
- Postal codes: 36452
- Dialling codes: 036964

Zella/Rhön (German pronunciation: [ˈtsɛla]) is a village and a former municipality in the Wartburgkreis district of Thuringia, Germany. Since 1 January 2019, it is part of the municipality Dermbach.
