= Stadtlengsfeld =

- Ortsteil of Dermbach
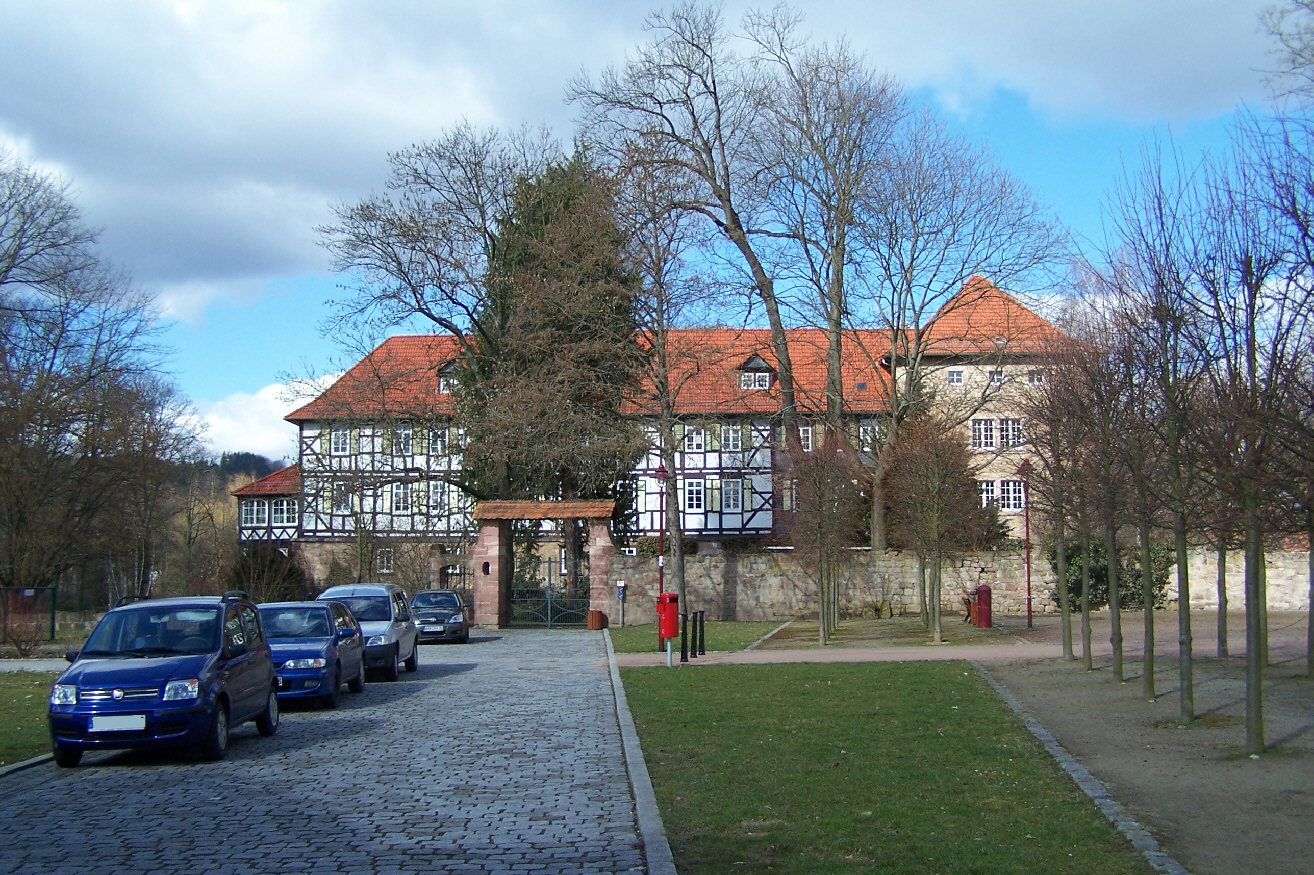
- Lengsfeld Castle

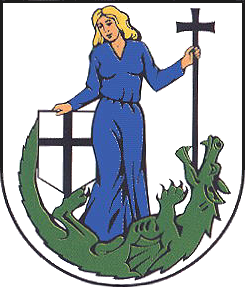
- Coat of arms
- Interactive map of Stadtlengsfeld
- Location within Germany Location within Thuringia
- Coordinates: 50°47′N 10°8′E
- Country: Germany
- State: Thuringia
- District: Wartburgkreis
- Municipality: Dermbach

Area
  - Total: 27.7 km^{2} (10.7 sq mi)
- Elevation: 272 m (892 ft)

Population (2017-12-31)
  - Total: 2,356
  - Density: 85.1/km^{2} (220/sq mi)
- Time zone: UTC+01:00 (CET)
  - Summer (DST): UTC+02:00 (CEST)
- Postal codes: 36457
- Dialling codes: 036965
- Website: stadtlengsfeld.eu

Stadtlengsfeld (German pronunciation: [ʃtatˈlɛŋsfɛlt]) is a town and a former municipality in the Wartburgkreis district of Thuringia, Germany. Since 1 January 2019, it is part of the municipality Dermbach. It is situated in the Rhön Mountains, 8 km southwest of Bad Salzungen.

== History ==
Within the German Empire (1871-1918), Stadtlengsfeld was part of the Grand Duchy of Saxe-Weimar-Eisenach.

It was the site of the Menzengraben mining accident in 1953.

== Sister cities ==
- Kiskőrös, Hungary
