= Sebastian Krüger =

German artist (born 1963)

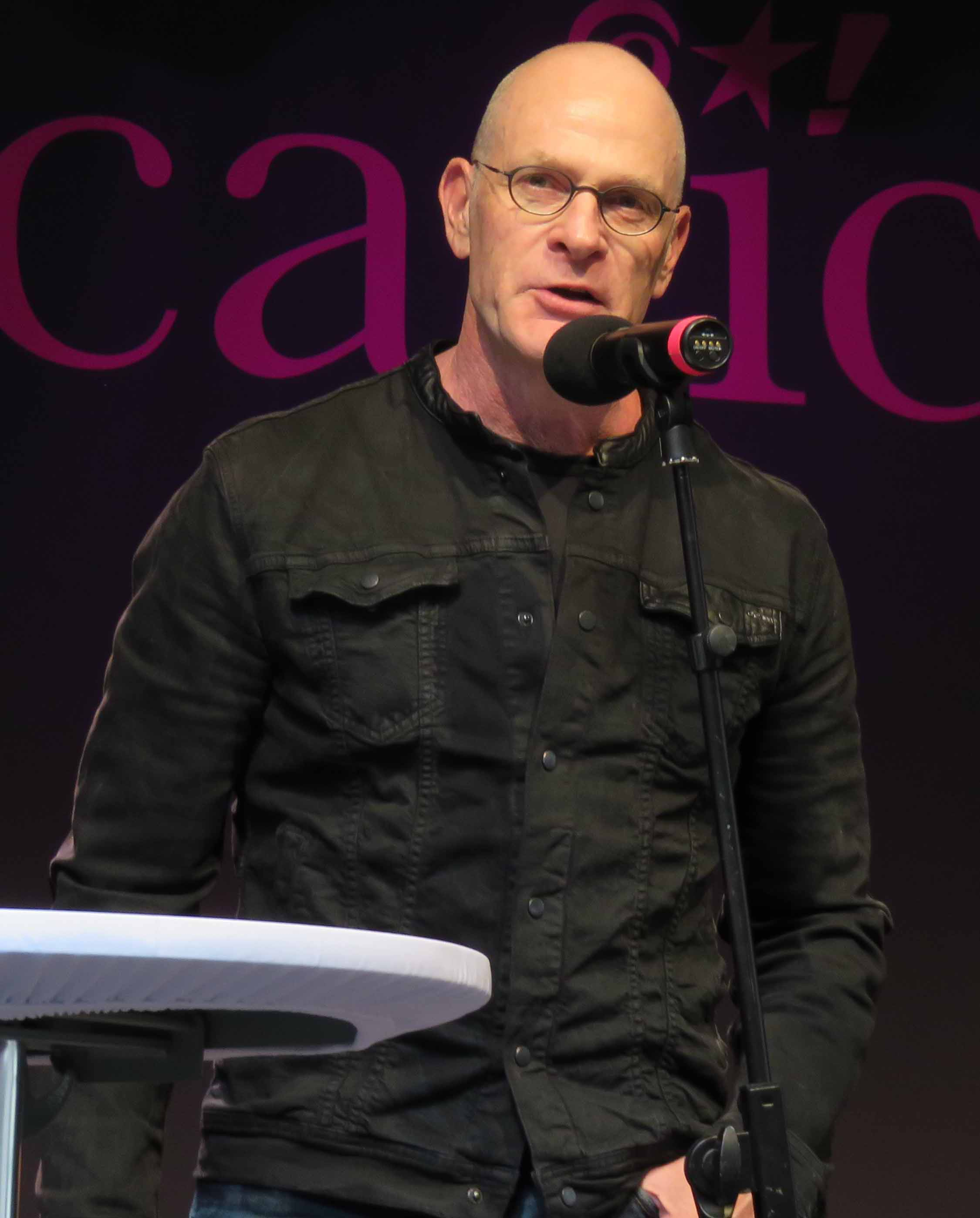

Sebastian Krüger (born 30 June 1963 in Hamelin, Germany) is a German artist.

After studying free painting with Prof. Dörfler at the Braunschweig University of Fine Arts he made a stunning reputation as the designer of a number of cover spreads for the press in Germany and abroad and as an illustrator and creative designer of various LP covers. He then stepped away from commercial work and became a painter. During the ‘90s he also collaborated with the italian political magazine L’Espresso. In recent years, his work has moved away from the "star caricatures" to New Pop Realism.

The artist lives and works near Hanover and in California. His primary medium is acrylic paint, and his paintings are hyper-realistic in detail, yet also extremely grotesque in their distortion. He is well known for his lifelike depictions of The Rolling Stones, in particular, Keith Richards.
