= Daniel Stieglitz =

German caricature artist

Daniel Stieglitz (born 4 March 1980 in Cham, (Germany)) is a caricature artist, director and writer. He studied animation, illustration and filmmaking at the Kunsthochschule Kassel in Hessia and graduated with the 45min movie "Spielzeugland Endstation" in 2008, which won Hessian Film Award in 2009.

He has worked as a storyboard artist for commercials and movies like the Oscar nominated The Baader Meinhof Complex and did animations for several German TV-Shows.

In 2018 he won the Golden Nosey Award at the ISCA Convention in San Diego

As a professional live caricature artist, he was invited to many international conventions as a keynote speaker.

Among others:

- 2015 at the 2. Festival for Graphic Storytelling in Kassel
- 2018 at the Caricature Convention Eindhoven
- 2019 at the Eurocature Convention in Vienna
- 2019 at the Asociación Española de Caricaturistas Congress in Valencia
- 2024 at the FACES! Festival at PAFF in Pordenone - Italy
- 2026 at the Eurocature Convention in Austria

== Publications ==
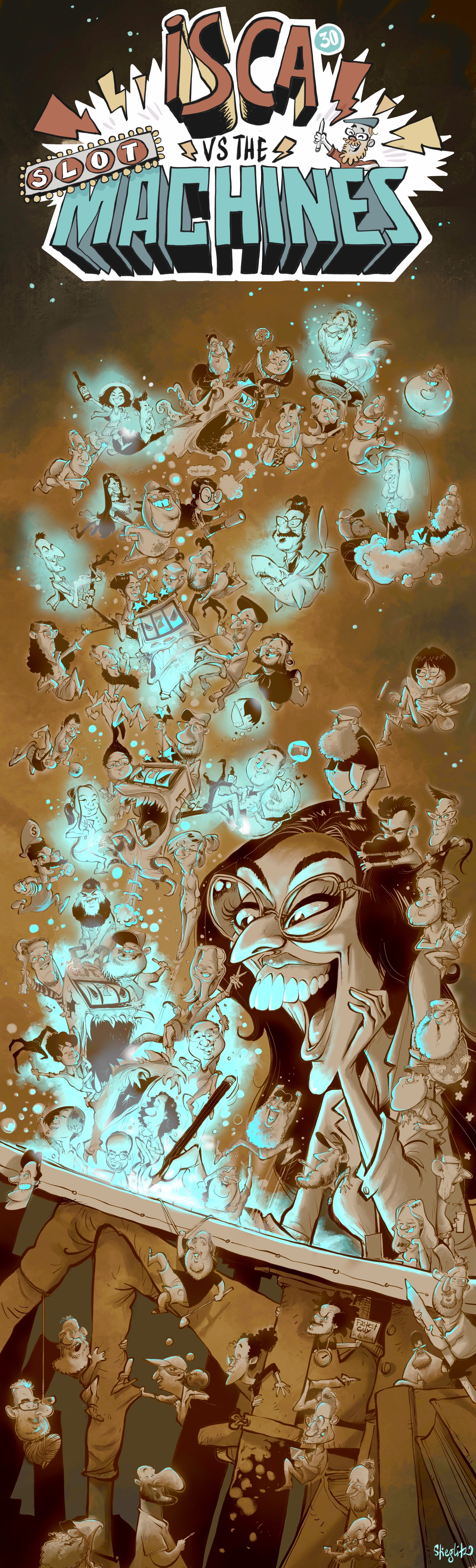
"ISCA vs the Slot Machines" - Group Caricature by Daniel Stieglitz. 2021 Las Vegas

=== Movies ===
- 2002: Toons Total – animated Short, director, animation
- 2005: Happy End – Jede Geschichte braucht ein Ende, director, screenwriter, producer
- 2006: fly and fall, director, screenwriter, producer
- 2009: Spielzeugland Endstation, director, screenwriter, producer

=== Books ===
- Drachen gibt's nicht 2016 (ISBN 978-3862222032)
- Kritzelblock Kassel 2015 (ISBN 978-3981604689)
- Elli ist schlecht drauf 2017
- Was mich ärgert, entscheide ich (Illustrator) 2019 (ISBN 978-3869804422)
- Mein Jahr 2021 mit SWR1 Hits & Storys (Illustrator) 2020 (ISBN 978-3981981964)
- Luis und Lena - Die Zahnlücke des Grauens (Illustrator) 2020 (ISBN 978-3570177495)
- Jolly Old Elf: The Art of Santa H. Claus (Illustrator) 2020 (ISBN 978-1735891309)
- Luis und Lena - Der Zwerg des Zorns (Illustrator) 2021 (ISBN 978-3570177501)
- Mein Jahr 2022 mit SWR1 Hits & Storys (Illustrator) 2021 (ISBN 978-3949183041)
- Luis und Lena - Die Scherze des Schreckens (Illustrator) 2022 (ISBN 978-3570179635)
- Donnie & Jan - Ziemlich beste Brüder. Angriff der Gangster-Kühe (Illustrator) 2023 (ISBN 9783401606750)
- Donnie & Jan - Ziemlich beste Brüder. Party-Hotspot Hühnerstall (Illustrator) 2024 (ISBN 978-3401606767)

== Awards ==
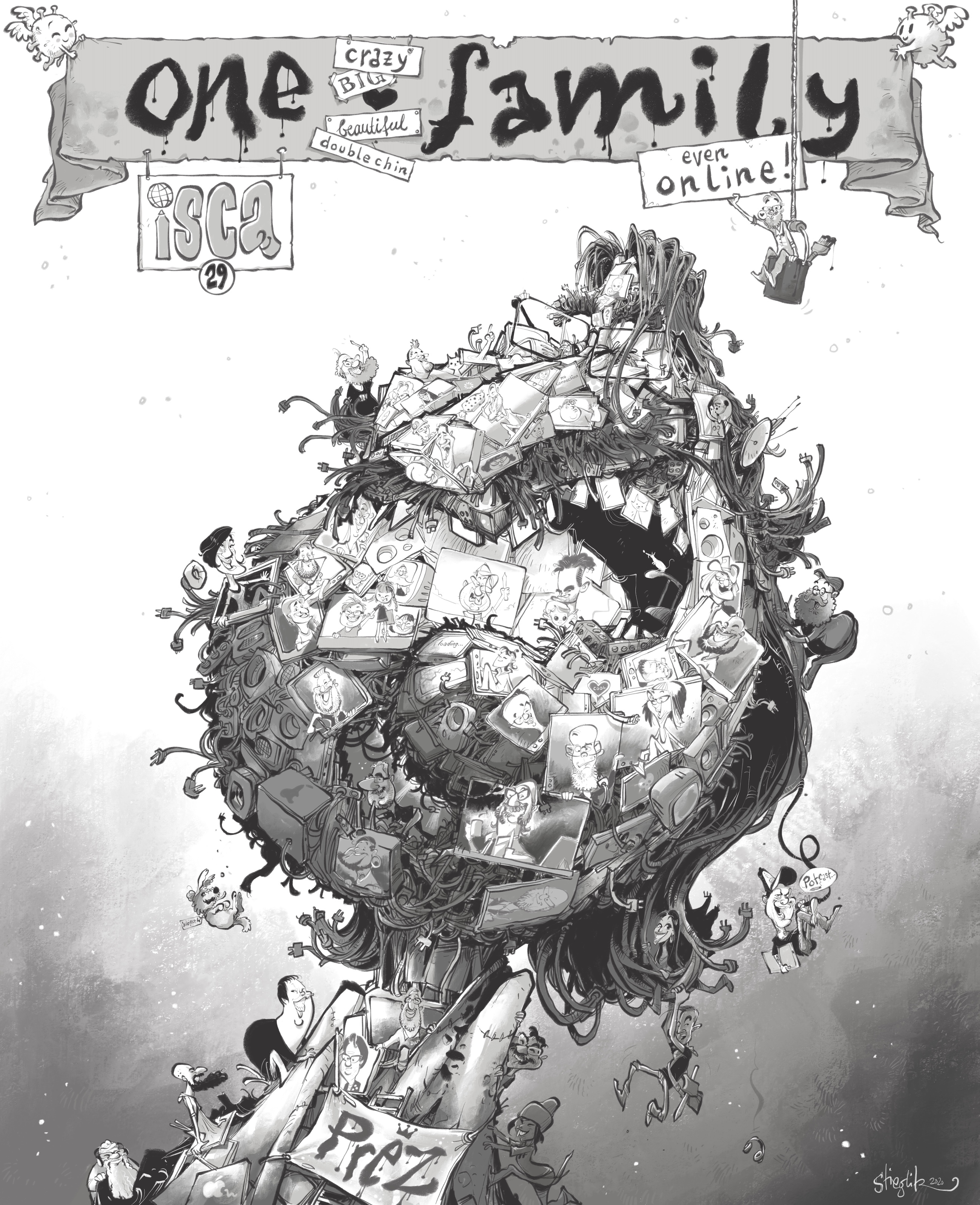
ONE FAMILY - by daniel stieglitz for ISCA Con 2020 - Mailboy Mayhem

Daniel Stieglitz has won numerous international awards, including

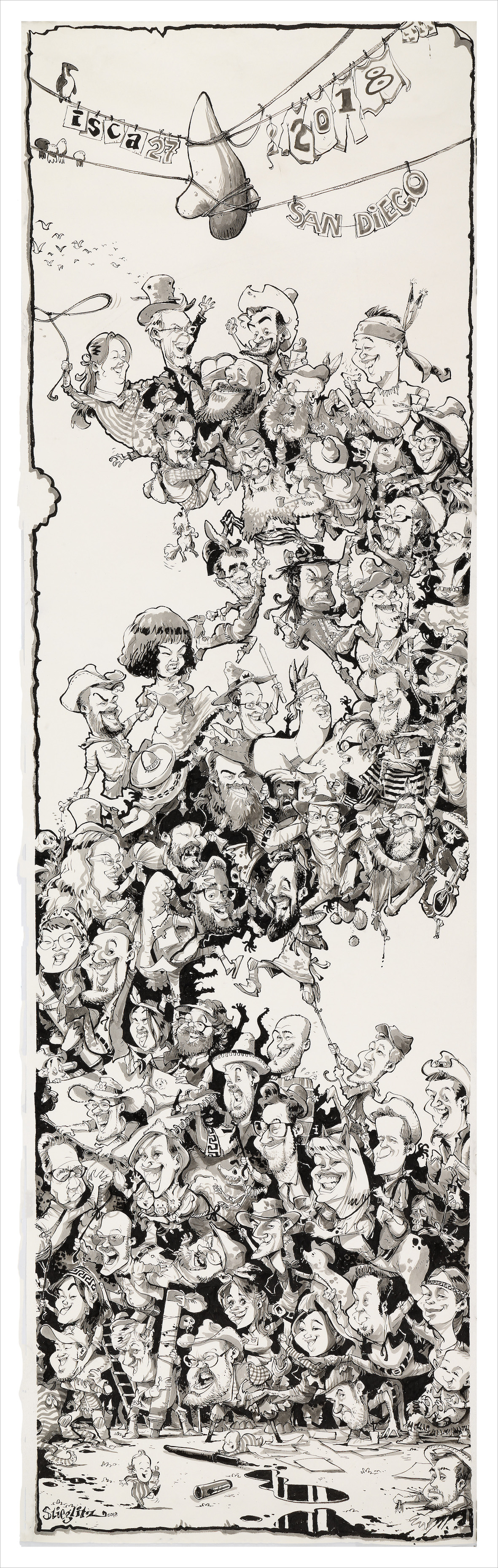
"the Golden Nosey rush" – panorama caricature by Daniel Stieglitz

- 2026 1. Place King of Mac Caricon at the 10th Caricon in Glasgow
- 2026 1. Place for Best Idea at the 10th KOSCA Con in Seoul
- 2026 2. Place for Best Caricature Artist of the Year at the 10th KOSCA Con in Seoul
- 2026 2. Place for Best Humor at the 10th KOSCA Con in Seoul
- 2026 2. Place for Best Body Expression at the 10th KOSCA Con in Seoul
- 2025 1. Place for Caricaturist of the Year at the Japan Grand Prix in Tokyo
- 2025 1. Place for Caricature of the Year at the Japan Grand Prix in Tokyo
- 2024 Bronce Nosey for Best Caricature Artist of the Year at the ISCA Con 33 in Kissimmee
- 2024 1. Place for Best Caricature of the Year at the ISCA Con 33 in Kissimmee Florida
- 2023 1. Place for Best Caricature of the Year at the ISCA Con 32 in Los Angeles
- 2023 Bronce Nosey - 3. Place for Third Best Caricature Artist of the Year at the ISCA Con 2023 in Los Angeles
- 2023 Silver World Humor Award - Italy
- 2022 1. Place for Best Caricature of the Year at the ISCA Con 31 in Orlando
- 2022 1. Place for Outstanding Group Composition at the ISCA Con 31 in Orlando
- 2022 Klaus Dill-Award
- 2022 Bronze World Humor Award - Italy
- 2021 1. Place for Best Caricature of the Year at the ISCA Con 2021 in Las Vegas
- 2021 Silver Nosey 2. Place for Second Best Caricature Artist of the Year at the ISCA Con 2021 in Las Vegas
- 2021 1. Place for Outstanding Group Composition at the ISCA Con 2021 in Las Vegas
- 2021 1. Place for Best Live Event Style at the ISCA Con 2021 in Las Vegas
- 2020 1. Place for Best Caricature of the Year at the ISCA Con 2020 MAILBOX MAYHEM
- 2020 1. Place for Outstanding Group Composition at the ISCA Con 2020 MAILBOX MAYHEM
- 2019 1. Place for Best Caricature of the Year at the ISCA Con 2019 in Memphis
- 2019 1. Place for Outstanding Group Composition at the ISCA Con 2019 in Memphis
- 2019 1. Place for Outstanding Body Situation at the ISCA Con 2019 in Memphis
- 2019 1. Place for Best Traditional Caricature at the Eurocature 2019
- 2019 1. Place for Best Political Caricature at the Eurocature 2019
- 2018 Golden Nosey for Best Caricature Artist of the Year at the ISCA Con 2018 in San Diego
- 2018 1. Place for Best Caricature of the Year at the ISCA Con 2018 in San Diego
- 2018 1. Place for Outstanding Group Composition at the ISCA Con 2018 in San Diego
- 2018 1. Place for Outstanding Body Situation at the ISCA Con 2018 in San Diego
- 2018 3. Place for Black and White Technique at the ISCA Con 2018 in San Diego
- 2018 1. Place for Rookie of the Year at the ISCA Con 2018 in San Diego
- 2018 1. Place for Best Traditional Caricature at the Eurocature 2018
- 2018 1. Place for Best 'Theme' Work' at the Montmartre Minicon Eindhoven
- 2018 1. Place for Best Likeness Caricature at the Montmartre Minicon Eindhoven
- 2018 1. Place for Most Inspiring Work at the Montmartre Minicon Eindhoven
- 2018 1. Place for Overall Best Work at the Montmartre Minicon Eindhoven
- 2009 Hessischer Filmpreis for Spielzeugland Endstation
- 2006 Prädikat "wertvoll" for fly and fall
- 2006 2. Price for fly and fall at the Visinale 06
- 2006 Audience award fly and fall at the Film Festival Oldenburg
- 2006 Best Short for fly and fall at the 7. Toti Film Festival Maribor
- 2005 Best first Movie for Happy End – Jede Geschichte braucht ein Ende at the internationalen Independent Film Festival Brüssel
