= Neidhartshausen =

- Ortsteil of Dermbach
- Interactive map of Neidhartshausen
- Location within Germany Location within Thuringia
- Coordinates: 50°40′43″N 10°7′32″E
- Country: Germany
- State: Thuringia
- District: Wartburgkreis
- Municipality: Dermbach

Area
  - Total: 7.61 km^{2} (2.94 sq mi)
- Elevation: 375 m (1,230 ft)

Population (2017-12-31)
  - Total: 347
  - Density: 45.6/km^{2} (118/sq mi)
- Time zone: UTC+01:00 (CET)
  - Summer (DST): UTC+02:00 (CEST)
- Postal codes: 36466
- Dialling codes: 036964
- Vehicle registration: WAK

Neidhartshausen (German pronunciation: [naɪthaʁtsˈhaʊzn̩]) is a village and a former municipality in the Wartburgkreis district of Thuringia, Germany. Since 1 January 2019, it is part of the municipality Dermbach.
