= Siedlisko, Greater Poland Voivodeship =

Siedlisko
- Village
- Location within Poland
- Coordinates: 52°59′N 16°23′E
- Country: Poland
- Voivodeship: Greater Poland
- County: Czarnków-Trzcianka
- Gmina: Trzcianka
- Population: 1,000

Siedlisko ([ɕɛˈdliskɔ]; German: Stieglitz) is a village in the administrative district of Gmina Trzcianka, within Czarnków-Trzcianka County, Greater Poland Voivodeship, in west-central Poland.
