= Dermbach =

- Municipality
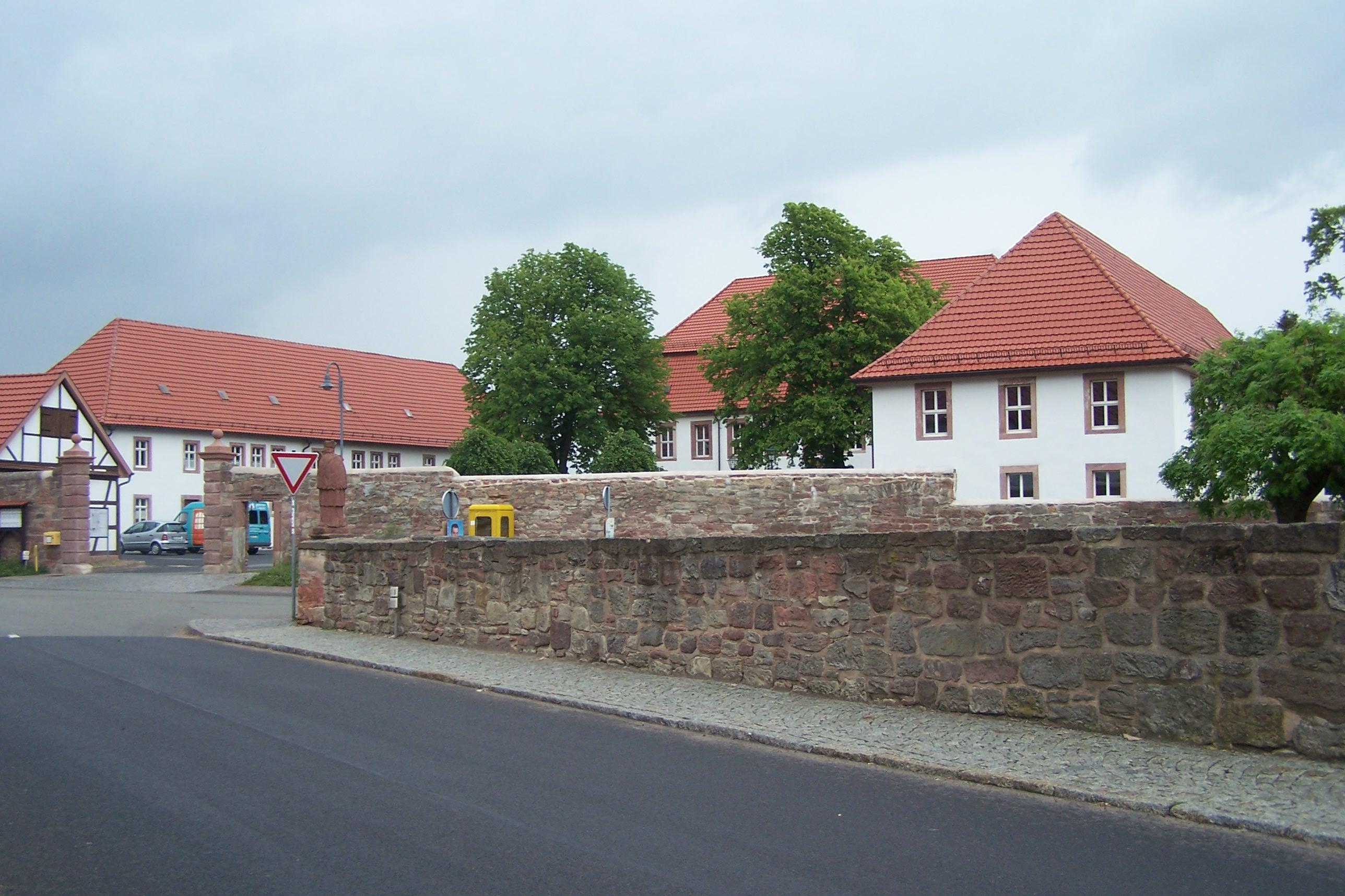
- Dermbach Castle

- Coat of arms

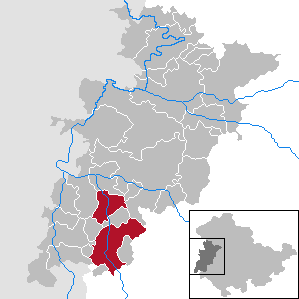
- Location of Dermbach within Wartburgkreis district
- Interactive map of Dermbach
- Location within Germany Location within Thuringia
- Coordinates: 50°42′59″N 10°7′11″E
- Country: Germany
- State: Thuringia
- District: Wartburgkreis

Government
  - Mayor (2022–28): Thomas Hugk (CDU)

Area
  - Total: 91.96 km^{2} (35.51 sq mi)
- Elevation: 370 m (1,210 ft)

Population (2025-12-31)
  - Total: 6,889
  - Density: 74.91/km^{2} (194.0/sq mi)
- Time zone: UTC+01:00 (CET)
  - Summer (DST): UTC+02:00 (CEST)
- Postal codes: 36463–36466
- Dialling codes: 036964
- Vehicle registration: WAK
- Website: www.dermbach.net

Dermbach (German pronunciation: [ˈdɛʁmbax]) is a municipality in the Wartburgkreis district of Thuringia, Germany. The former municipalities Brunnhartshausen, Diedorf, Neidhartshausen, Stadtlengsfeld, Urnshausen and Zella/Rhön were merged into Dermbach in January 2019.
