= List of municipal flags of Central Germany =

This page lists the municipal flags of Central Germany. It is a part of the Lists of German municipal flags, which is split into regions due to its size.

== Index by state ==
Click the states to browse the municipal flags

== Hesse ==
=== Cities ===
Municipality	Flag	Coat of arms	Enactment Date	Description	Ref.
Darmstadt			First adopted: 15th century Current form: 1917	A blue-white horizontal striped flag. The coat of arms with lion and lily is already located on a keystone of the lower vault of the city church tower from the 15th century. Century. The coat of arms was re-granted in 1917 in today's forms and colours by the then Grand Duke of Hesse. The lion is the heraldic animal of the Counts of Katzenelnbogen, who ruled the city. The lion of the Katzenelnbogener can also be seen in the coat of arms of Auerbach (Bensheim-Auerbach), Zwingenberg a.d.B., Pfungstadt, Katzenelnbogen and Sankt Goar. The lily was later inserted into the coat of arms, probably to distinguish lion representations in other coats of arms. The origin of the lily cannot be proven with certainty. However, it is suspected that the lily is supposed to symbolise the city church in Darmstadt, which was originally dedicated to Mother Mary. The lily is considered a sign of purity and is therefore often presented as an attribute of the Virgin Mary.	
Frankfurt			Coat of arms: 1936; Current form: 5 June 1952	A white-red horizontal striped flag. The Frankfurt eagle goes back to the single-headed imperial eagle from the thirteenth century.	

Kassel

Offenbach am Main

Wiesbaden

Wiesbaden (variant)

=== Bergstraße ===
Municipality	Flag	Coat of arms	Enactment Date	Description	Ref.
Abtsteinach			Coat of arms: 6 September 1972; Flag: 14 January 1980	A blue-white-blue striped flag. The coat of arms contains a golden sword and a golden key. It was taken over by the former Ober-Abtsteinach community when the community was founded. The coat of arms of Abtsteinach is a canting arms. The abbot's staff documents the connection of Abtsteinach as the property of the Lorsch monastery (there was no abbey in Abtsteinach). The rock or mountain symbolizes the Hardberg as the highest mountain in the area, which is defining for Abtsteinach. The wave shield base symbolizes the course of the Steinach, whose source rises in Abtsteinach and flows into the Neckar. It was designed by Darmstadt heraldist Georg Massoth.	

=== Kassel ===
Municipality	Flag	Coat of arms	Enactment Date	Description	Ref.
Ahnatal			15 June 1978	A red-white-red-white-red striped flag. The coat of arms features as fleur-de-lis. It was designed by Bad Nauheim heraldist Heinz Ritt.	

=== Hersfeld-Rotenburg ===
Municipality	Flag	Coat of arms	Enactment Date	Description	Ref.
Alheim			Coat of arms and vertical flag: 25 May 1973; Horizontal flag: Not yet approved	A green-white-red-white-green flag. The coat of arms depicts the Alheimerturm observation tower.	

=== Limburg-Weilburg ===
Municipality	Flag	Coat of arms	Enactment Date	Description	Ref.
Weilmünster			Coat of arms: 1 July 1935; Vertical Flag: 12 February 1963; Horizontal flag: Not yet approved	A blue and orange orthogonal quartered flag. These colours represent the Duchy of Nassau. The coat of arms in its current form was awarded on 1 July 1935 by the President of the Province of Hesse-Nassau and confirmed by the Hesse Interior Ministry on 30 September 1983. At the same time, the municipality of Weilmünster (Oberlahnkreis) was granted the right to use the name “market town” in a separate document. The church in the coat of arms is modeled on the Protestant church in Weilmünster. The golden lion with the seven shingles comes from the coat of arms of the former Duchy of Nassau. It can be proven that today's coat of arms was used as an official seal shortly after the Thirty Years' War.	

=== Rheingau-Taunus-Kreis ===
Municipality	Flag	Coat of arms	Enactment Date	Description	Ref.
Aarbergen			Coat of arms: 29 September 1972; Vertical flag: 31 January 1973; Horizontal flag: Not yet approved	A blue-white striped flag. The coat of arms contains a golden sword and a golden key crossed diagonally in blue over a golden shield base divided by a pine cut.	

=== Waldeck-Frankenberg ===
Municipality	Flag	Coat of arms	Enactment Date	Description	Ref.
Allendorf (Eder)			Coat of arms and vertical flag: 11 April 1967; Horizontal flag: Not yet approved	A blue-white-blue striped flag. The award of the coat of arms came after the endorsement of a report prepared by Karl Ernst Demandt on 1 March 1967. This was based on research by the former director of the Marburg State Archives Carl Knetsch and the archivist and librarian Hans Joachim von Brockhusen. Originally, the coat of arms was probably the family coat of arms of the von Allendorf (Aldindorf, Altendorf) noble family, which died out in the 15th century, according to Knetsch and Brockhusen. However, the village chronicler Norbert Henkel criticizes the allegedly inadequate evidence for this assumption. Despite multiple documented mentions of a noble family who named themselves Allendorf after the town, there is so far no evidence that today's municipal coat of arms served as their family coat of arms. Henkel cannot understand the documentary basis on which Knetsch connects the coat of arms sketch attached to his research with the family coat of arms of the von Allendorf family. The coat of arms sketch mentioned here was probably based on the sandstone relief on the Battenfeld church, which probably dates from the 15th century and which can still be seen there today. This is an alliance coat of arms that shows a coat of arms with facing crescents over a star on the right side and the coat of arms of the Biedenfeld family that is clearly identifiable on the left side. According to heraldic interpretation, this alliance coat of arms illustrates that a woman of the von Allendorf family entered into a marriage with a man of the von Biedenfeld family. Knetsch may have drawn the conclusion from a family tree he created for the von Biedenfeld family that this was the coat of arms of the von Allendorf family. Henkel concludes that today's municipal coat of arms cannot be traced back with certainty to a family coat of arms of the von Allendorf family, since their family coat of arms is not known or cannot be clearly assigned to it. It is therefore clear to him that the coat of arms belonged to the wife of a man from the von Biedenfeld family. The identity and origins of this wife are still unclear today. Based on the alliance coat of arms, it can be assumed that this couple could have been connected to the construction work on the Battenfeld church.	

Allendorf (Lumda)

Alsbach-Hähnlein

Alsfeld

Altenstadt

Amöneburg

Angelburg

Angelburg (variant)

Antrifttal

Aßlar

Babenhausen

Bad Arolsen

Bad Arolsen (variant)

Bad Camberg

Bad Emstal

Bad Endbach

Bad Endbach (variant)

Bad Hersfeld

Bad Homburg

Bad Homburg

Bad Karlshafen

Bad König

Bad Nauheim

Bad Orb

Bad Salzschlirf

Bad Schwalbach

Bad Soden

Bad Soden-Salmünster

Bad Sooden-Allendorf

Bad Vilbel

Bad Wildungen

Bad Wildungen (variant)

Bad Zwesten

Battenberg

Battenberg

Baunatal

Bebra

Bensheim

Berkatal

Beselich

Biblis

Bickenbach

Biebergemünd

Biebertal

Biebesheim am Rhein

Biedenkopf

Biedenkopf (variant)

Birkenau

Birstein

Bischoffen

Bischofsheim

Borken

Brachttal

Braunfels

Brechen

Breidenbach

Breidenbach (variant)

Breitenbach am Herzberg

Breitscheid

Brensbach

Breuberg

Breuna

Brombachtal

Bromskirchen

Bruchköbel

Büdingen

Bürstadt

Büttelborn

Burghaun

Burgwald

Buseck

Butzbach

Calden

Cölbe

Cölbe (variant)

Cornberg

Dautphetal

Dautphetal (variant)

Dieburg

Diemelsee

Diemelstadt

Dietzenbach

Dietzhölztal

Dillenburg

Dillenburg (variant)

Dipperz

Dornburg

Dreieich

Driedorf

Ebersburg

Ebsdorfergrund

Ebsdorfergrund (variant)

Echzell

Edermünde

Edertal

Egelsbach

Ehrenberg

Ehringshausen

Eichenzell

Einhausen

Eiterfeld

Elbtal

Eltville

Elz

Eppertshausen

Eppstein

Erbach im Odenwald

Erlensee

Erzhausen

Eschborn

Eschenburg

Eschwege

Espenau

Feldatal

Felsberg

Fernwald

Fischbachtal

Flieden

Flörsbachtal

Flörsheim am Main

Florstadt

Fränkisch-Crumbach

Frankenau

Frankenberg

Freiensteinau

Freigericht

Friedberg

Friedewald

Friedrichsdorf

Frielendorf

Fritzlar

Fronhausen

Fronhausen (variant)

Fürth

Fulda

Fuldabrück

Fuldatal

Gedern

Geisenheim

Gelnhausen

Gemünden (Felda)

Gemünden (Wohra)

Gernsheim

Gersfeld

Giessen

Gilserberg

Ginsheim-Gustavsburg

Gladenbach

Gladenbach (variant)

Glashütten

Glauburg

Gorxheimertal

Grävenwiesbach

Grasellenbach

Grebenau

Grebenhain

Grebenstein

Greifenstein

Griesheim

Großalmerode

Groß-Bieberau

Großenlüder

Großkrotzenburg

Groß-Rohrheim

Groß-Umstadt

Groß-Zimmern

Grünberg

Gründau

Gudensberg

Guxhagen

Habichtswald

Hadamar

Haiger

Haina

Hainburg

Hammersbach

Hanau

Hanau (variant)

Hasselroth

Hattersheim am Main

Hatzfeld

Hauneck

Haunetal

Heidenrod

Helsa

Heppenheim

Heppenheim (variant)

Herborn

Herbstein

Heringen

Herleshausen

Hessisch Lichtenau

Heuchelheim

Heusenstamm

Hilders

Hirschhorn

Hirzenhain

Hochheim am Main

Höchst im Odenwald

Hofbieber

Hofgeismar

Hofheim

Hohenahr

Hohenroda

Hohenstein

Homberg (Efze)

Homberg (Ohm)

Hosenfeld

Hünfeld

Hünfelden

Hünstetten

Hüttenberg

Hungen

Idstein

Idstein (variant)

Immenhausen

Jesberg

Jossgrund

Kalbach

Karben

Kaufungen

Kefenrod

Kelkheim

Kelsterbach

Kiedrich

Kirchhain

Kirchheim

Kirtorf

Knüllwald

Königstein im Taunus

Körle

Korbach

Kriftel

Kronberg im Taunus

Künzell

Lahnau

Lahntal

Lahntal (variant)

Lampertheim

Langen

Langenselbold

Langgöns

Laubach

Lauterbach

Lautertal

Lautertal

Leun

Lich

Lichtenfels

Liebenau

Liederbach am Taunus

Limburg an der Lahn

Limeshain

Linden

Lindenfels

Linsengericht

Löhnberg

Lohfelden

Lohra

Lohra (variant)

Lollar

Lorch am Rhein

Lorsch

Ludwigsau

Lützelbach

Mainhausen

Maintal

Malsfeld

Marburg

Marburg (variant 1)

Marburg (variant 2)

Meinhard

Meißner

Melsungen

Melsungen (variant)

Mengerskirchen

Merenberg

Messel

Michelstadt

Modautal

Mörfelden-Walldorf

Mörlenbach

Morschen

Mossautal

Mücke

Mühlheim am Main

Mühltal

Münchhausen am Christenberg

Münchhausen am Christenberg (variant)

Münster

Münzenberg

Nauheim

Naumburg

Neckarsteinach

Nentershausen

Neu-Anspach

Neuberg

Neu-Eichenberg

Neuenstein

Neuental

Neuhof

Neu-Isenburg

Neukirchen

Neustadt

Neustadt (variant)

Nidda

Niddatal

Nidderau

Niedenstein

Niederaula

Niederdorfelden

Niedernhausen

Nieste

Niestetal

Nüsttal

Oberaula

Ober-Mörlen

Ober-Ramstadt

Obertshausen

Obertshausen (variant 1)

Obertshausen (variant 2)

Oberursel

Oberzent

Oestrich-Winkel

Ortenberg

Ottrau

Otzberg

Petersberg

Pfungstadt

Philippsthal

Pohlheim

Poppenhausen

Rabenau

Ranstadt

Rasdorf

Raunheim

Rauschenberg

Rauschenberg

Reichelsheim (Odenwald)

Reichelsheim (Wetterau)

Reinhardshagen

Reinheim

Reiskirchen

Riedstadt

Rimbach

Ringgau

Rockenberg

Rodenbach

Rodgau

Rödermark

Romrod

Ronneburg

Ronshausen

Rosbach vor der Höhe

Rosenthal

Roßdorf

Rotenburg an der Fulda

Rüdesheim am Rhein

Rüsselsheim am Main

Runkel

Schaafheim

Schauenburg

Schenklengsfeld

Schlangenbad

Schlitz

Schlüchtern

Schmitten im Taunus

Schöffengrund

Schöneck

Schotten

Schrecksbach

Schwalbach am Taunus

Schwalmstadt

Schwalmtal

Schwarzenborn

Seeheim-Jugenheim

Seligenstadt

Selters (Taunus)

Siegbach

Sinn

Sinntal

Söhrewald

Solms

Sontra

Spangenberg

Stadtallendorf

Stadtallendorf (variant)

Staufenberg

Steffenberg

Steinau an der Straße

Steinbach (Taunus)

Stockstadt am Rhein

Sulzbach

Tann

Taunusstein

Trebur

Trendelburg

Twistetal

Ulrichstein

Usingen

Vellmar

Viernheim

Villmar

Vöhl

Volkmarsen

Wabern

Wächtersbach

Waldbrunn

Waldeck

Waldeck (variant)

Waldems

Waldkappel

Waldkappel (variant)

Wald-Michelbach

Waldsolms

Walluf

Wanfried

Wartenberg

Wehretal

Wehrheim

Weilburg

Weilrod

Weimar

Weimar (variant)

Weinbach

Weißenborn

Weiterstadt

Wesertal

Wettenberg

Wetter

Wetter (variant)

Wetzlar

Wildeck

Willingen

Willingshausen

Witzenhausen

Wölfersheim

Wöllstadt

Wohratal

Wohratal (variant)

Wolfhagen

Zierenberg

Zwingenberg

=== Historical ===
Beerfelden

Beilstein

Bergen

Brunslar

Burgholzhausen vor der Höhe

Dietkirchen

Fischbach (Taunus)

Hesseneck (1983-2018)

Hesseneck (1983-2018; variant)

Maintal-Dörnigheim (1968-1974)

Maintal-Dörnigheim (1968-1974; variant)

Ober-Laudenbach

Oberweser

Rodau (1970-1971)

Rodau (1970-1971; variant)

Rothenberg (1981-2018)

Rothenberg (1981-2018; variant)

Sensbachtal (1986-2018)

Sensbachtal (1986-2018; variant)

Wahlsburg (1980-2018)

Wahlsburg (1980-2018; variant)

Wallau

Wenkbach

Worfelden

== Thuringia ==
=== Cities ===
Altenburg

Erfurt

Erfurt (variant)

Gera

Gotha

Jena

Mühlhausen

Nordhausen

Nordhausen (variant)

Suhl

Weimar

=== Landgemeinden ===
Am Ettersberg

Am Ohmberg

An der Schmücke

Artern

Auma-Weidatal

Bad Sulza

Bleicherode

Buttstädt

Dingelstädt

Drei Gleichen

Georgenthal

Geratal

Grammetal

Greußen

Großbreitenbach

Harztor

Heringen/Helme

Hörsel

Ilmtal-Weinstraße

Kindelbrück

Mohlsdorf-Teichwolframsdorf

Nesse-Apfelstädt

Nessetal

Nottertal-Heilinger Höhen

Roßleben-Wiehe

Schwarzatal

Sonnenstein

Südeichsfeld

Unstrut-Hainich

Vogtei

=== Towns and villages ===
Abtsbessingen

Ahlstädt

Albersdorf

Alkersleben

Allendorf

Alperstedt

Altenberga

Altenbeuthen

Altenburg

Amt Creuzburg

Amt Wachsenburg

Andisleben

Anrode

Apolda

Apolda (variant)

Arenshausen

Arnstadt

Asbach-Sickenberg

Auengrund

Bad Berka

Bad Blankenburg

Bad Frankenhausen

Bad Klosterlausnitz

Bad Köstritz

Bad Langensalza

Bad Liebenstein

Bad Lobenstein

Bad Salzungen

Bad Tabarz

Bad Tennstedt

Ballhausen

Ballstedt

Barchfeld-Immelborn

Bechstedt

Beinerstadt

Bellstedt

Belrieth

Berga

Berka vor dem Hainich

Berlingerode

Bethenhausen

Bibra

Bienstädt

Birkenfelde

Birx

Bischofrod

Bischofroda

Blankenburg

Blankenhain

Bobeck

Bocka

Bodelwitz

Bodenrode-Westhausen

Bornhagen

Borxleben

Bösleben-Wüllersleben

Brahmenau

Braunichswalde

Brehme

Breitenworbis

Breitungen

Bremsnitz

Brotterode-Trusetal

Bruchstedt

Brünn

Bucha

Büchel

Buchfart

Buhla

Bürgel

Burgwalde

Buttlar

Büttstedt

Caaschwitz

Christes

Clingen

Crimla

Crossen an der Elster

Cursdorf

Dachwig

Deesbach

Dermbach

Dieterode

Dietzenrode-Vatterode

Dillstädt

Dingsleben

Dittersdorf

Dobitschen

Döbritschen

Döbritz

Döllstädt

Dornburg-Camburg

Dornheim

Döschnitz

Dreitzsch

Drognitz

Dünwald

Ebeleben

Eberstedt

Ecklingerode

Eckstedt

Effelder

Ehrenberg

Eichenberg, Saale-Holzland

Eichenberg, Hildburghausen

Eichstruth

Eineborn

Einhausen

Eisenach

Eisenberg

Eisfeld

Elgersburg

Elleben

Ellingshausen

Ellrich

Elxleben, Ilm-Kreis

Elxleben

Emleben

Empfertshausen

Endschütz

Erbenhausen

Eschenbergen

Eßbach

Ettersburg

Etzleben

Fambach

Ferna

Floh-Seligenthal

Fockendorf

Föritztal

Frankenblick

Frankendorf

Frankenheim

Frankenroda

Frauenprießnitz

Freienbessingen

Freienhagen

Freienorla

Fretterode

Friedelshausen

Friedrichroda

Friemar

Gangloffsömmern

Gauern

Gebesee

Gefell

Gehofen

Geisa

Geisenhain

Geisleden

Geismar

Gerbershausen

Gernrode

Geroda

Gerstenberg

Gerstengrund

Gerstungen

Gertewitz

Gierstädt

Glasehausen

Gneus

Göhren

Goldisthal

Göllnitz

Golmsdorf

Göpfersdorf

Görkwitz

Görsbach

Göschitz

Gösen

Gössitz

Gößnitz

Gotha

Grabfeld

Gräfenthal

Graitschen bei Bürgel

Greiz

Griefstedt

Grimmelshausen

Grobengereuth

Großbartloff

Großbockedra

Großenstein

Großeutersdorf

Großfahner

Großheringen

Großlöbichau

Großlohra

Großmölsen

Großneuhausen

Großpürschütz

Großrudestedt

Großschwabhausen

Großvargula

Grub

Gumperda

Günstedt

Hainichen

Hainspitz

Hallungen

Hammerstedt

Harth-Pöllnitz

Hartmannsdorf

Hartmannsdorf

Haselbach

Haßleben

Haussömmern

Haynrode

Heideland

Heilbad Heiligenstadt

Helbedündorf

Heldburg

Henfstädt

Herbsleben

Hermsdorf

Herrenhof

Hetschburg

Heukewalde

Heuthen

Heyersdorf

Hilbersdorf

Hildburghausen

Hirschberg

Hirschfeld

Hohenfelden

Hohengandern

Hohenleuben

Hohenstein

Hohenwarte

Hohes Kreuz

Holzsußra

Hornsömmern

Hörselberg-Hainich

Hummelshain

Hundhaupten

Ilmenau

Jenalöbnitz

Jonaswalde

Kahla

Kalbsrieth

Kaltennordheim

Kammerforst

Kapellendorf

Karlsdorf

Katzhütte

Kauern

Kaulsdorf

Kehmstedt

Keila

Kella

Kiliansroda

Kirchgandern

Kirchheilingen

Kirchworbis

Kirschkau

Kleinbockedra

Kleinebersdorf

Kleineutersdorf

Kleinfurra

Kleinmölsen

Kleinneuhausen

Kleinschwabhausen

Klettbach

Kloster Veßra

Kölleda

Königsee

Korbußen

Körner

Kospoda

Kraftsdorf

Kranichfeld

Krauthausen

Krayenberggemeinde

Kriebitzsch

Krölpa

Krombach

Kühdorf

Kühndorf

Küllstedt

Kutzleben

Kyffhäuserland

Laasdorf

Langenleuba-Niederhain

Langenorla

Langenwetzendorf

Langenwolschendorf

Lauscha

Lausnitz

Lauterbach

Lederhose

Lehesten

Lehesten

Lehnstedt

Leimbach

Leinefelde-Worbis

Lemnitz

Lengfeld

Lenterode

Leutenberg

Leutersdorf

Linda bei Weida

Lindenkreuz

Lindewerra

Lindig

Lippersdorf-Erdmannsdorf

Lipprechterode

Löberschütz

Löbichau

Lödla

Löhma

Lucka

Luisenthal

Lutter

Mackenrode

Magdala

Marisfeld

Markvippach

Marolterode

Marth

Martinroda

Masserberg

Mechelroda

Mehmels

Mehna

Meiningen

Mellingen

Menteroda

Mertendorf

Meura

Meusebach

Meuselwitz

Miesitz

Milda

Mittelpöllnitz

Mittelsömmern

Möckern

Molschleben

Mönchpfiffel-Nikolausrieth

Monstab

Mörsdorf

Moßbach

Moxa

Mühlhausen

Münchenbernsdorf

Nauendorf

Nausnitz

Nazza

Neubrunn

Neuengönna

Neuhaus am Rennweg

Neumark

Neundorf bei Schleiz

Neustadt an der Orla

Niederbösa

Niedergebra

Niederorschel

Niedertrebra

Nimritz

Nobitz

Nöda

Nottleben

Oberbodnitz

Oberbösa

Oberheldrungen

Oberhof

Obermaßfeld-Grimmenthal

Oberoppurg

Oberstadt

Obertrebra

Oberweid

Oechsen

Oettern

Oettersdorf

Ohrdruf

Ollendorf

Oppershausen

Oppurg

Orlamünde

Osthausen-Wülfershausen

Ostramondra

Ottendorf

Paitzdorf

Paska

Petersberg

Peuschen

Pfaffschwende

Pferdingsleben

Plaue

Plothen

Pölzig

Ponitz

Pörmitz

Posterstein

Pößneck

Poxdorf

Probstzella

Quaschwitz

Ranis

Rannstedt

Rastenberg

Rattelsdorf

Rauda

Rauschwitz

Rausdorf

Reichenbach

Reichstädt

Reinholterode

Reinsdorf

Reinstädt

Remptendorf

Renthendorf

Reurieth

Rhönblick

Riethgen

Riethnordhausen

Ringleben

Rippershausen

Ritschenhausen

Rittersdorf

Rockstedt

Rodeberg

Rohr

Rohrbach

Rohrberg

Röhrig

Römhild

Ronneburg

Rosa

Rosendorf

Rosenthal am Rennsteig

Rositz

Roßdorf

Rothenstein

Rückersdorf

Rudolstadt

Ruhla

Rustenfelde

Ruttersdorf-Lotschen

Saalburg-Ebersdorf

Saalfeld

Saara

Schachtebich

Schalkau

Scheiditz

Schimberg

Schkölen

Schlechtsart

Schleid

Schleifreisen

Schleiz

Schleusegrund

Schleusingen

Schlöben

Schloßvippach

Schmalkalden

Schmeheim

Schmiedehausen

Schmieritz

Schmölln

Schmorda

Schöndorf

Schöngleina

Schönhagen

Schönstedt

Schöps

Schwaara

Schwabhausen

Schwallungen

Schwarza

Schwarzbach

Schwarzburg

Schweickershausen

Schwerstedt

Schwobfeld

Seebach

Seelingstädt

Seisla

Seitenroda

Serba

Sickerode

Silbitz

Sitzendorf

Solkwitz

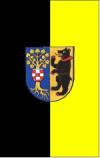
Sollstedt

Sömmerda

Sondershausen

Sonneberg

Sonneborn

Sprötau

Stadtilm

Stadtroda

Starkenberg

Sankt Bernhard

Steinach

Steinbach

Steinbach-Hallenberg

Steinheuterode

Sankt Gangloff

Straufhain

Straußfurt

Sulza

Sülzfeld

Sundhausen

Tambach-Dietharz

Tanna

Tastungen

Tautenburg

Tautendorf

Tautenhain

Tegau

Teichwitz

Teistungen

Thalwenden

Themar

Thierschneck

Thonhausen

Tissa

Tömmelsdorf

Tonna

Tonndorf

Topfstedt

Tottleben

Treben

Trebra

Treffurt

Triptis

Tröbnitz

Tröchtelborn

Trockenborn-Wolfersdorf

Tüttleben

Uder

Udestedt

Uhlstädt-Kirchhasel

Ummerstadt

Umpferstedt

Unstruttal

Unterbodnitz

Unterbreizbach

Untermaßfeld

Unterweißbach

Unterwellenborn

Urbach

Urleben

Utendorf

Vacha

Vachdorf

Veilsdorf

Vogelsberg

Volkerode

Volkmannsdorf

Vollersroda

Vollmershain

Wachstedt

Wahlhausen

Waldeck

Walpernhain

Walschleben

Waltersdorf

Waltershausen

Wasserthaleben

Wasungen

Wehnde

Weida

Weilar

Weira

Weißbach

Weißenborn

Weißendorf

Weißensee

Wernburg

Werningshausen

Werra-Suhl-Tal

Werther

Westgreußen

Westhausen

Wichmar

Wiegendorf

Wiesenfeld

Wiesenthal

Wilhelmsdorf

Windischleuba

Wingerode

Witterda

Witzleben

Wundersleben

Wünschendorf/Elster

Wurzbach

Wüstheuterode

Wutha-Farnroda

Zedlitz

Zella-Mehlis

Zeulenroda-Triebes

Ziegenrück

Zimmern

Zimmernsupra

Zöllnitz

== See also ==
- List of municipal flags of Northern Germany
- List of municipal flags of Western Germany
- List of municipal flags of Eastern Germany
- List of municipal flags of Southern Germany
