= List of towns and municipalities in Thuringia =

Division of Thuringia into municipalities, municipal associations and districts (as of 1 January 2024)

This is a list of the towns, cities and municipalities in Thuringia in Germany. The German federal state of Thuringia consists of a total of

- 631 politically independent cities, towns and municipalities (as of 1 July 2021).

These are divided as follows:

- 117 towns and cities, of which
  - 5 are independent towns or cities (kreisfreie Städte) (including the state capital of Erfurt),
  - 1 is a "large district town" (Große Kreisstadt),
  - 5 are "large district-associated towns" (Große kreisangehörige Städte),
  - 80 are independent towns (they discharge all municipal functions themselves – 23 towns of which are "fulfilling municipalities" (erfüllende Gemeinden),
  - 24 are special towns, which are part of municipal associations (Verwaltungsgemeinschaften),
- 514 other municipalities, of which
  - 58 are independent municipalities (they discharge all municipal functions themselves – 16 of which are fulfilling municipalities),
  - 456 are other municipalities.

387 towns and municipalities have merged their municipal authorities into 43 municipal associations. See: Municipal associations in Thuringia.

A feature of the Thuringian administration are the "fulfilling municipalities" (erfüllende Gemeinden). 39 towns and villages that do not belong to a municipal association are fulfilling municipalities for another 95 municipalities.

30 municipalities are referred to as "rural municipalities" (Landgemeinden); they can be towns at the same time.

== Independent towns and cities (Kreisfreie Städte) ==
- Erfurt (state capital)
- Gera
- Jena
- Suhl
- Weimar

== Large county towns ==
- Altenburg (county town)
- Eisenach
- Gotha (county town)
- Ilmenau
- Mühlhausen (county town)
- Nordhausen (county town)

== Towns and municipalities ==
All politically independent towns and municipalities in Thuringia (towns are shown in bold):

=== A ===
- Abtsbessingen
- Ahlstädt
- Albersdorf
- Alkersleben
- Allendorf
- Alperstedt
- Altenberga
- Altenbeuthen
- **Altenburg** (county town)
- Altenfeld
- Altengottern
- Altersbach
- Altkirchen
- Am Ohmberg
- Andenhausen
- Andisleben
- Angelroda
- Anrode
- **Apolda** (county town)
- Arenshausen
- **Arnstadt** (county town)
- **Artern/Unstrut**
- Asbach-Sickenberg
- Aschenhausen
- Auengrund
- Auerstedt
- **Auma-Weidatal**

=== B ===
- Bachfeld
- **Bad Berka**
- **Bad Blankenburg**
- **Bad Colberg-Heldburg**
- **Bad Frankenhausen/Kyffhäuser**
- Bad Klosterlausnitz
- **Bad Köstritz**
- **Bad Langensalza**
- **Bad Liebenstein**
- **Bad Lobenstein**
- Badra
- **Bad Salzungen** (county town)
- **Bad Sulza**
- **Bad Tennstedt**
- Ballhausen
- Ballstädt
- Ballstedt
- Barchfeld
- Bauerbach
- Bechstedt
- Bechstedtstraß
- Beichlingen
- Beinerstadt
- Bellstedt
- Belrieth
- Bendeleben
- Benshausen
- **Berga/Elster**
- Berka vor dem Hainich
- **Berka/Werra**
- Berlingerode
- Berlstedt
- Bermbach
- Bernterode (bei Heilbad Heiligenstadt)
- Bethenhausen
- Bibra (bei Jena)
- Bienstädt
- Bilzingsleben
- Birkenfelde
- Birkenhügel
- Birx
- Bischofrod
- Bischofroda
- Blankenberg
- Blankenburg
- **Blankenhain**
- Blankenstein
- **Bleicherode**
- Bobeck
- Bocka
- Bockstadt
- Bodelwitz
- Bodenrode-Westhausen
- Böhlen
- Bollberg
- Bornhagen
- Borxleben
- Bösleben-Wüllersleben
- Bothenheilingen
- Brahmenau
- Braunichswalde
- Brehme
- Breitenworbis
- Breitungen/Werra
- Bremsnitz
- Bretleben
- **Brotterode-Trusetal**
- Bruchstedt
- Brüheim
- Brünn
- Brunnhartshausen
- Bucha (bei Jena)
- Bucha (bei Ziegenrück)
- Büchel
- Buchfart
- Buchholz
- Bufleben
- Buhla
- **Bürgel**
- Burgk
- Burgwalde
- **Buttelstedt**
- Buttlar
- **Buttstädt**
- Büttstedt

=== C ===
- Caaschwitz
- Christes
- Chursdorf
- **Clingen**
- Crawinkel
- **Creuzburg**
- Crimla
- Crispendorf
- Crossen an der Elster
- Cursdorf

=== D ===
- Daasdorf a. Berge
- Dachwig
- Dankmarshausen
- Deesbach
- Dermbach
- Deuna
- Diedorf
- Dieterode
- Dietzenrode-Vatterode
- Dillstädt
- **Dingelstädt**
- Dingsleben
- Dippach
- Dittersdorf
- Dobitschen
- Döbritschen
- Döbritz
- Döllstädt
- Donndorf
- **Dornburg-Camburg**
- Dorndorf
- Dornheim
- Döschnitz
- Dreba
- Drei Gleichen
- Dreitzsch
- Dröbischau
- Drogen
- Drognitz
- Dünwald

=== E ===
- **Ebeleben**
- Ebenshausen
- Eberstedt
- Ecklingerode
- Eckstedt
- Effelder (Eichsfeld)
- Effelder-Rauenstein
- Ehrenberg
- Eichenberg (bei Jena)
- Eichenberg (bei Hildburghausen)
- Eichstruth
- Eineborn
- Einhausen
- **Eisenach** (kreisfreie Stadt)
- **Eisenberg** (county town)
- **Eisfeld**
- Elgersburg
- Elleben
- Ellersleben
- Ellingshausen
- **Ellrich**
- Elxleben (an der Gera)
- Elxleben (Ilm-Kreis)
- Emleben
- Empfertshausen
- Emsetal
- Endschütz
- Erbenhausen
- **Erfurt** (Landeshauptstadt)
- Eschenbergen
- Eßbach
- Eßleben-Teutleben
- Ettenhausen a.d. Suhl
- Ettersburg
- Etzelsrode
- Etzleben

=== F ===
- Fambach
- Ferna
- Fischbach/Rhön
- Flarchheim
- Floh-Seligenthal
- Flurstedt
- Fockendorf
- Föritz
- Frankendorf
- Frankenhain
- Frankenheim/Rhön
- Frankenroda
- Frauenprießnitz
- Frauensee
- Frauenwald
- Freienbessingen
- Freienhagen
- Freienorla
- Fretterode
- Friedelshausen
- Friedersdorf
- **Friedrichroda**
- Friedrichsthal
- Friedrichswerth
- Friemar
- Frohnsdorf
- Frömmstedt

=== G ===
- Gangloffsömmern
- Gauern
- **Gebesee**
- Gebstedt
- **Gefell**
- Gehlberg
- Gehofen
- **Gehren**
- **Geisa**
- Geisenhain
- Geisleden
- Geismar
- Georgenthal
- **Gera** (kreisfreie Stadt)
- Geraberg
- Gerbershausen
- Gernrode
- Geroda
- Gerstenberg
- Gerstengrund
- Gerstungen
- Gerterode
- Gertewitz
- Geschwenda
- Gierstädt
- Gillersdorf
- Glasehausen
- Gleichamberg
- Gneus
- Göhren (bei Altenburg)
- Goldbach
- Goldisthal
- Göllingen
- Göllnitz
- Golmsdorf
- Gompertshausen
- Göpfersdorf
- Görkwitz
- Görsbach
- Gorsleben
- Göschitz
- Gösen
- Gossel
- Gössitz
- **Gößnitz**
- **Gotha** (county town)
- Grabfeld
- Gräfenhain
- Gräfenroda
- **Gräfenthal**
- Graitschen bei Bürgel
- **Greiz** (county town)
- **Greußen**
- Griefstedt
- Grimmelshausen
- Grobengereuth
- Großbartloff
- Großbockedra
- **Großbreitenbach**
- Großbrembach
- **Großenehrich**
- Großengottern
- Großensee
- Großenstein
- Großeutersdorf
- Großfahner
- Großheringen
- Großlöbichau
- Großlohra
- Großmölsen
- Großmonra
- Großneuhausen
- Großobringen
- Großpürschütz
- Großröda
- Großrudestedt
- Großschwabhausen
- Großvargula
- Grub
- Gumperda
- Günserode
- Günstedt
- Günthersleben-Wechmar
- Guthmannshausen

=== H ===
- Hachelbich
- Hain
- Haina (bei Gotha)
- Haina (Südthüringen)
- Hainichen
- Hainrode
- Hainspitz
- Hallungen
- Hammerstedt
- Hardisleben
- Harra
- Harth-Pöllnitz
- Hartmannsdorf (bei Eisenberg)
- Hartmannsdorf (bei Gera)
- Harzungen
- Haselbach
- Haßleben
- Hausen
- Haussömmern
- Hauteroda
- Haynrode
- Heichelheim
- Heideland
- **Heilbad Heiligenstadt** (county town)
- Helbedündorf
- **Heldrungen**
- Hellingen
- Helmsdorf
- Hemleben
- Henfstädt
- Henneberg
- Henschleben
- Herbsleben
- **Heringen/Helme**
- **Hermsdorf**
- Heroldishausen
- Herrenhof
- Herrmannsacker
- Herrnschwende
- Herschdorf
- Hetschburg
- Heukewalde
- Heuthen
- Heyersdorf
- Heygendorf
- Hilbersdorf
- **Hildburghausen** (county town)
- **Hirschberg**
- Hirschfeld
- Hochheim
- Hohenfelden
- Hohengandern
- Hohenkirchen
- **Hohenleuben**
- Hohenölsen
- Hohenstein
- Hohenwarte
- Hohes Kreuz
- Holzsußra
- Hopfgarten
- Hornsömmern
- Hörsel
- Hörselberg-Hainich
- Hummelshain
- Hümpfershausen
- Hundeshagen
- Hundhaupten

=== I ===
- Ichstedt
- Ichtershausen
- Ifta
- Ilfeld
- **Ilmenau**
- Ilmtal
- Immelborn
- Isseroda
- Issersheilingen

=== J ===
- **Jena** (kreisfreie Stadt)
- Jenalöbnitz
- Jonaswalde
- Jückelberg
- Judenbach

=== K ===
- **Kahla**
- Kalbsrieth
- Kallmerode
- Kaltenlengsfeld
- **Kaltennordheim**
- Kaltensundheim
- Kaltenwestheim
- Kammerforst
- Kamsdorf
- Kannawurf
- Kapellendorf
- Karlsdorf
- Katzhütte
- Kauern
- Kaulsdorf
- Kefferhausen
- Kehmstedt
- Keila
- Kella
- Kiliansroda
- **Kindelbrück**
- Kirchgandern
- Kirchheilingen
- Kirchheim
- Kirchworbis
- Kirschkau
- Kleinbartloff
- Kleinbockedra
- Kleinbodungen
- Kleinbrembach
- Kleinebersdorf
- Kleineutersdorf
- Kleinfurra
- Kleinmölsen
- Kleinneuhausen
- Kleinobringen
- Kleinschwabhausen
- Kleinwelsbach
- Klettbach
- Klettstedt
- Klings
- Kloster Veßra
- Knau
- Ködderitzsch
- **Kölleda**
- **Königsee**
- Korbußen
- Körner
- Kospoda
- Kraftsdorf
- Kraja
- **Kranichfeld**
- Krauthausen
- Krautheim
- Kreuzebra
- Kriebitzsch
- Krölpa
- Krombach
- Kromsdorf
- Kühdorf
- Kühndorf
- Küllstedt
- Kutzleben

=== L ===
- Laasdorf
- Langenleuba-Niederhain
- Langenorla
- Langenwetzendorf
- Langenwolschendorf
- **Langewiesen**
- Langula
- **Lauscha**
- Lausnitz
- Lauterbach
- Lederhose
- **Lehesten** (Frankenwald)
- Lehesten (bei Jena)
- Lehnstedt
- Leimbach
- Leinatal
- **Leinefelde-Worbis**
- Lemnitz
- Lengfeld
- Lenterode
- **Leutenberg**
- Leutenthal
- Leutersdorf
- Lichte
- Liebenstein
- Liebstedt
- Linda b. Neustadt an der Orla
- Linda b. Weida
- Lindenkreuz
- Lindewerra
- Lindig
- Lippersdorf-Erdmannsdorf
- Lipprechterode
- Löberschütz
- Löbichau
- Lödla
- Löhma
- **Lucka**
- Luisenthal
- Lumpzig
- Lunzig
- Lutter

=== M ===
- Mackenrode
- **Magdala**
- Mannstedt
- Marisfeld
- Marksuhl
- Markvippach
- Marolterode
- Marth
- Martinroda (Ilm-Kreis)
- Martinroda (bei Vacha)
- Masserberg
- Mattstedt
- Mechelroda
- Mehmels
- Mehna
- **Meiningen** (county town)
- Mellenbach-Glasbach
- Mellingen
- Melpers
- Mendhausen
- Mengersgereuth-Hämmern
- Menteroda
- Merkers-Kieselbach
- Mertendorf
- Metzels
- Meura
- Meusebach
- Meuselbach-Schwarzmühle
- **Meuselwitz**
- Miesitz
- Mihla
- Milda
- Milz
- Mittelpöllnitz
- Mittelsömmern
- Möckern
- Mohlsdorf
- Möhrenbach
- Molschleben
- Mönchenholzhausen
- Mönchpfiffel-Nikolausrieth
- Monstab
- Moorgrund
- Mörsdorf
- Moßbach
- Moxa
- **Mühlhausen/Thuringia** (county town)
- Mülverstedt
- **Münchenbernsdorf**

=== N ===
- Nahetal-Waldau
- Nauendorf
- Nausitz
- Nausnitz
- Nazza
- Neidhartshausen
- Nesse-Apfelstädt
- Neubrunn
- Neuengönna
- Neugernsdorf
- **Neuhaus am Rennweg**
- Neuhaus-Schierschnitz
- **Neumark**
- Neumühle/Elster
- Neundorf (bei Lobenstein)
- Neundorf (bei Schleiz)
- Neunheilingen
- Neusiß
- Neustadt am Rennsteig
- **Neustadt an der Orla**
- Neustadt/Harz
- Niederbösa
- Niederdorla
- Niedergebra
- Niederorschel
- Niederreißen
- Niederroßla
- Niedersachswerfen
- Niedertrebra
- Niederzimmern
- Nimritz
- Nirmsdorf
- Nöbdenitz
- Nobitz
- Nöda
- Nohra (bei Weimar)
- Nohra (Wipper)
- **Nordhausen** (county town)
- Nottleben

=== O ===
- Oberbodnitz
- Oberbösa
- Oberdorla
- Oberhain
- Oberheldrungen
- **Oberhof**
- Oberkatz
- Oberland am Rennsteig
- Obermaßfeld-Grimmenthal
- Obermehler
- Oberoppurg
- Oberreißen
- Oberschönau
- Oberstadt
- Obertrebra
- Oberweid
- **Oberweißbach**
- Oechsen
- Oepfershausen
- Oettern
- Oettersdorf
- **Ohrdruf**
- Olbersleben
- Oldisleben
- Ollendorf
- Oppershausen
- Oppurg
- **Orlamünde**
- Oßmannstedt
- Osthausen-Wülfershausen
- Ostramondra
- Ottendorf
- Ottstedt a. Berge

=== P ===
- Paitzdorf
- Paska
- Pennewitz
- Petersberg
- Petriroda
- Peuschen
- Pfaffschwende
- Pferdingsleben
- Pfiffelbach
- Piesau
- Pillingsdorf
- **Plaue**
- Plothen
- Pölzig
- Ponitz
- Pörmitz
- Posterstein
- **Pößneck**
- Pottiga
- Poxdorf
- Probstzella

=== Q ===
- Quaschwitz
- Quirla

=== R ===
- Ramsla
- **Ranis**
- Rannstedt
- **Rastenberg**
- Rattelsdorf
- Rauda
- Rauschwitz
- Rausdorf
- Reichenbach
- Reichmannsdorf
- Reichstädt
- Reinholterode
- Reinsdorf
- Reinstädt
- Reisdorf
- **Remda-Teichel**
- Remptendorf
- Remstädt
- Renthendorf
- Reurieth
- Rhönblick
- Riethgen
- Riethnordhausen
- Ringleben (bei Artern)
- Ringleben (bei Gebesee)
- Rippershausen
- Ritschenhausen
- Rittersdorf
- Rockhausen
- Rockstedt
- Rodeberg
- Rohr
- Rohrbach (Weimarer Land)
- Rohrbach (bei Saalfeld)
- Rohrberg
- Röhrig
- **Römhild**
- **Ronneburg**
- Rosa
- Rosendorf
- Rositz
- Roßdorf
- **Roßleben**
- Rothenstein
- Rottenbach
- Rotterode
- Rottleben
- Rückersdorf
- Rudersdorf
- **Rudolstadt**
- **Ruhla**
- Rustenfelde
- Ruttersdorf-Lotschen

=== S ===
- **Saalburg-Ebersdorf**
- Saaleplatte
- **Saalfeld/Saale** (county town)
- Saalfelder Höhe
- Saara (bei Gera)
- Saara (bei Schmölln)
- Sachsenbrunn
- Sachsenhausen
- Schachtebich
- **Schalkau**
- Scheibe-Alsbach
- Scheiditz
- Schillingstedt
- Schimberg
- **Schkölen**
- Schlechtsart
- Schlegel
- Schleid
- Schleifreisen
- **Schleiz** (county town)
- Schleusegrund
- **Schleusingen**
- Schlöben
- Schloßvippach
- **Schlotheim**
- **Schmalkalden**
- Schmeheim
- Schmiedefeld (Lichtetal)
- Schmiedefeld am Rennsteig
- Schmiedehausen
- Schmieritz
- **Schmölln**
- Schmorda
- Schömberg
- Schöndorf
- Schöngleina
- Schönhagen
- Schönstedt
- Schöps
- Schwaara
- Schwabhausen
- Schwallungen
- Schwarza
- Schwarzbach
- Schwarzburg
- Schweickershausen
- Schweina
- Schwerstedt (bei Straußfurt)
- Schwerstedt (bei Weimar)
- Schwobfeld
- Seebach
- Seega
- Seelingstädt
- Seisla
- Seitenroda
- Serba
- Sickerode
- Siegmundsburg
- Silberhausen
- Silbitz
- Sitzendorf
- Solkwitz
- Sollstedt
- **Sömmerda** (county town)
- **Sondershausen** (county town)
- **Sonneberg** (county town)
- Sonneborn
- Sonnenstein
- Springstille
- Sprötau
- **Stadtilm**
- **Stadtlengsfeld**
- **Stadtroda**
- Stanau
- Starkenberg
- St. Bernhard
- **Steinach**
- Steinbach (Eichsfeld)
- Steinbach (Wartburgkreis)
- **Steinbach-Hallenberg**
- Steinheuterode
- Steinsdorf
- Steinthaleben
- Stepfershausen
- St. Gangloff
- St. Kilian
- Straufhain
- Straußfurt
- Stützerbach
- Südeichsfeld
- **Suhl** (kreisfreie Stadt)
- Sulza
- Sülzfeld
- Sundhausen

=== T ===
- Tabarz/Thür. Wald
- **Tambach-Dietharz**
- **Tanna**
- Tastungen
- Tautenburg
- Tautendorf
- Tautenhain
- Tegau
- Teichwitz
- Teichwolframsdorf
- Teistungen
- Thalwenden
- **Themar**
- Thierschneck
- Thonhausen
- Thuringiahausen
- Tiefenort
- Tissa
- Tömmelsdorf
- Tonna
- Tonndorf
- Topfstedt
- Tottleben
- Treben
- Trebra
- **Treffurt**
- **Triptis**
- Tröbnitz
- Tröchtelborn
- Trockenborn-Wolfersdorf
- Troistedt
- Tüttleben

=== U ===
- Uder
- Udestedt
- Uhlstädt-Kirchhasel
- **Ummerstadt**
- Umpferstedt
- Unstruttal
- Unterbodnitz
- Unterbreizbach
- Unterkatz
- Untermaßfeld
- Unterschönau
- Unterweid
- Unterweißbach
- Unterwellenborn
- Urbach
- Urleben
- Urnshausen
- Utendorf

=== V ===
- **Vacha**
- Vachdorf
- Veilsdorf
- Viernau
- Vippachedelhausen
- Vogelsberg
- Vogtländisches Oberland
- Voigtstedt
- Volkerode
- Völkershausen
- Volkmannsdorf
- Vollenborn
- Vollersroda
- Vollmershain

=== W ===
- Wachsenburggemeinde
- Wachstedt
- Wahlhausen
- Wahns
- Waldeck
- Wallbach
- Walldorf
- Walpernhain
- Walschleben
- Waltersdorf
- **Waltershausen**
- Wangenheim
- Warza
- Wasserthaleben
- **Wasungen**
- Weberstedt
- Wehnde
- **Weida**
- Weilar
- **Weimar** (kreisfreie Stadt)
- Weinbergen
- Weira
- Weißbach
- Weißenborn (Holzland)
- Weißendorf
- **Weißensee**
- Wernburg
- Werningshausen
- Werther
- Westenfeld
- Westgreußen
- Westhausen (bei Gotha)
- Westhausen (bei Hildburghausen)
- Wichmar
- Wickerstedt
- Wiegendorf
- **Wiehe**
- Wiesenfeld
- Wiesenthal
- Wildenbörten
- Wildenspring
- Wildetaube
- Wilhelmsdorf
- Willerstedt
- Windischleuba
- Wingerode
- Wipfratal
- Wipperdorf
- Witterda
- Wittgendorf
- Witzleben
- Wohlsborn
- Wölferbütt
- Wolferschwenda
- Wölfershausen
- Wölfis
- Wolfsberg
- Wolfsburg-Unkeroda
- Wolkramshausen
- Wundersleben
- Wünschendorf/Elster
- **Wurzbach**
- Wüstheuterode
- Wutha-Farnroda

=== Z ===
- Zedlitz
- **Zella-Mehlis**
- Zella/Rhön
- **Zeulenroda-Triebes**
- Ziegelheim
- **Ziegenrück**
- Zimmern
- Zimmernsupra
- Zöllnitz

== See also ==
- List of towns in Thuringia
- Municipal associations in Thuringia
