= Dornburg-Camburg (Verwaltungsgemeinschaft) =

- Verwaltungsgemeinschaft
- Map of Saale-Holzland highlighting Dornburg-Camburg
- Interactive map of Dornburg-Camburg
- Location within Germany Location within Thuringia
- Coordinates: 51°00′N 11°41′E
- Country: Germany
- State: Thuringia
- District: Saale-Holzland
- Seat: Dornburg-Camburg
- Subdivisions: 13 municipalities

Area
  - Total: 120.6 km^{2} (46.6 sq mi)

Population (2025-12-31)
  - Total: 10,183
  - Density: 84.44/km^{2} (218.7/sq mi)
- Time zone: UTC+01:00 (CET)
  - Summer (DST): UTC+02:00 (CEST)
- Website: www.vg-dornburg-camburg.eu

Dornburg-Camburg is a Verwaltungsgemeinschaft ("collective municipality") in the district Saale-Holzland, in Thuringia, Germany. The seat of the Verwaltungsgemeinschaft is in Dornburg-Camburg.

The Verwaltungsgemeinschaft Dornburg-Camburg consists of the following municipalities:

1. Dornburg-Camburg
2. Frauenprießnitz
3. Golmsdorf
4. Großlöbichau
5. Hainichen
6. Jenalöbnitz
7. Lehesten
8. Löberschütz
9. Neuengönna
10. Tautenburg
11. Thierschneck
12. Wichmar
13. Zimmern
