= Hügelland/Täler =

- Verwaltungsgemeinschaft
- Map of Saale-Holzland highlighting Hügelland/Täler
- Interactive map of Hügelland/Täler
- Location within Germany Location within Thuringia
- Coordinates: 50°50′N 11°44′E
- Country: Germany
- State: Thuringia
- District: Saale-Holzland
- Seat: Tröbnitz
- Subdivisions: 21 municipalities

Area
  - Total: 128.54 km^{2} (49.63 sq mi)

Population (2025-12-31)
  - Total: 4,768
  - Density: 37.09/km^{2} (96.07/sq mi)
- Time zone: UTC+01:00 (CET)
  - Summer (DST): UTC+02:00 (CEST)
- Website: www.huegelland-taeler.de

Hügelland/Täler is a Verwaltungsgemeinschaft ("collective municipality") in the district Saale-Holzland, in Thuringia, Germany. The seat of the Verwaltungsgemeinschaft is in Tröbnitz.

== Municipalities ==
The Verwaltungsgemeinschaft Hügelland/Täler consists of the following municipalities:

1. Bremsnitz
2. Eineborn
3. Geisenhain
4. Gneus
5. Großbockedra
6. Karlsdorf
7. Kleinbockedra
8. Kleinebersdorf
9. Lippersdorf-Erdmannsdorf
10. Meusebach
11. Oberbodnitz
12. Ottendorf
13. Rattelsdorf
14. Rausdorf
15. Renthendorf
16. Tautendorf
17. Tissa
18. Trockenborn-Wolfersdorf
19. Tröbnitz
20. Waltersdorf
21. Weißbach
