= Zimmern, Saale-Holzland-Kreis =

Zimmern
- Municipality
- Location of Zimmern within Saale-Holzland-Kreis district
- Interactive map of Zimmern
- Location within Germany Location within Thuringia
- Coordinates: 51°0′24″N 11°37′33″E
- Country: Germany
- State: Thuringia
- District: Saale-Holzland-Kreis
- Municipal assoc.: Dornburg-Camburg

Government
  - Mayor (2022–28): Marion Claus

Area
  - Total: 5.92 km^{2} (2.29 sq mi)
- Elevation: 290 m (950 ft)

Population (2025-12-31)
  - Total: 171
  - Density: 28.9/km^{2} (74.8/sq mi)
- Time zone: UTC+01:00 (CET)
  - Summer (DST): UTC+02:00 (CEST)
- Postal codes: 07778
- Dialling codes: 036427
- Vehicle registration: SHK, EIS, SRO

Zimmern (German pronunciation: [ˈtsɪmɐn]) is a municipality in the Saale-Holzland district of Thuringia, Germany.
