= Saale-Holzland-Kreis =

Coordinates: 50°55′N 11°45′E

Saale-Holzland
- District
- Flag Coat of arms
- Country: Germany
- State: Thuringia
- Capital: Eisenberg

Government
  - District admin.: Johann Waschnewski (CDU)

Area
  - Total: 815.23 km^{2} (314.76 sq mi)

Population (31 December 2025)
  - Total: 83,342
  - Density: 102.23/km^{2} (264.78/sq mi)
- Time zone: UTC+01:00 (CET)
  - Summer (DST): UTC+02:00 (CEST)
- Vehicle registration: SHK, EIS, SRO
- Website: www.saale-holzland-kreis.de

Saale-Holzland (official German name: Saale-Holzland-Kreis) is a Kreis (district) in the east of Thuringia, Germany. Neighboring districts are (from the north clockwise) the district Burgenlandkreis in Saxony-Anhalt, the district-free city Gera, the districts Greiz, Saale-Orla, Saalfeld-Rudolstadt, Weimarer Land and the district-free city Jena.

== History ==
The district was created in 1994 by merging the previous districts of Eisenberg, Jena and Stadtroda. When the district Roda (later Stadtroda) was originally created in 1922 it already covered nearly the area of the current district. In 1952, together with the abolishment of the federal states (Bundesländer) the district was split into the three parts, which were put together again in 1994.

== Geography ==
The main river in the district is the Saale, which also gave it its name. The highest elevation with 475 m above sea level is in the south of the district, the lowest with 118 m is in the Saale valley at the boundary to the district Weimarer Land.

== Coat of arms ==
In the left of the coat of arms is the silver bar as the symbol of the Lords of Lobdeburg, who owned of the valley of the Saale in the 13th century. In the bottom is the lion of the Counts of Orlamünde, surrounded by 6 hearts. Their county went into the ownership of the Wettin family in 1396. The coat of arms of Saxony in the right is the same as the coat of arms of the Wettin, as they later became the rulers of Saxony. The coat of arms was approved on August 18, 1997.

== Towns and municipalities ==
Clickable map of municipalities in the district

Verwaltungsgemeinschaft-free towns
and municipalities
1. Bürgel
2. Eisenberg
3. Kahla
4. Stadtroda
1. Albersdorf
2. Bad Klosterlausnitz
3. Bobeck
4. Gösen
5. Graitschen bei Bürgel
6. Hainspitz
7. Mertendorf
8. Möckern
9. Nausnitz
10. Petersberg
11. Poxdorf
12. Rauschwitz
13. Ruttersdorf-Lotschen
14. Scheiditz
15. Schlöben
16. Schöngleina
17. Serba
18. Tautenhein
19. Waldeck
20. Weißenborn

Verwaltungsgemeinschaften
1. Dornburg-Camburg; 1. Dornburg-Camburg^{1, 2}; 2. Frauenprießnitz; 3. Golmsdorf; 4. Großlöbichau; 5. Hainichen; 6. Jenalöbnitz; 7. Lehesten; 8. Löberschütz; 9. Neuengönna; 10. Tautenburg; 11. Thierschneck; 12. Wichmar; 13. Zimmern; 2. Heideland-Elstertal-Schkölen; 1. Crossen an der Elster^{1}; 2. Hartmannsdorf; 3. Heideland; 4. Rauda; 5. Schkölen; 6. Silbitz; 7. Walpernhain	3. Hermsdorf; 1. Hermsdorf^{1, 2}; 2. Mörsdorf; 3. Reichenbach; 4. Schleifreisen; 5. Sankt Gangloff; 4. Hügelland/Täler; 1. Bremsnitz; 2. Eineborn; 3. Geisenhain; 4. Gneus; 5. Großbockedra; 6. Karlsdorf; 7. Kleinbockedra; 8. Kleinebersdorf; 9. Lippersdorf-Erdmannsdorf; 10. Meusebach; 11. Oberbodnitz; 12. Ottendorf; 13. Rattelsdorf; 14. Rausdorf; 15. Renthendorf; 16. Tautendorf; 17. Tissa; 18. Trockenborn-Wolfersdorf; 19. Tröbnitz^{1}; 20. Waltersdorf; 21. Weißbach	5. Südliches Saaletal; [seat: Kahla]: 1. Altenberga; 2. Bibra; 3. Bucha; 4. Eichenberg; 5. Freienorla; 6. Großeutersdorf; 7. Großpürschütz; 8. Gumperda; 9. Hummelshain; 10. Kleineutersdorf; 11. Laasdorf; 12. Lindig; 13. Milda; 14. Orlamünde^{2}; 15. Reinstädt; 16. Rothenstein; 17. Schöps; 18. Seitenroda; 19. Sulza; 20. Unterbodnitz; 21. Zöllnitz
^{1}seat of the Verwaltungsgemeinschaft;^{2}town
