= Heideland-Elstertal-Schkölen =

- Verwaltungsgemeinschaft
- Map of Saale-Holzland highlighting Heideland-Elstertal-Schkölen
- Interactive map of Heideland-Elstertal-Schkölen
- Location within Germany Location within Thuringia
- Coordinates: 50°59′N 11°59′E
- Country: Germany
- State: Thuringia
- District: Saale-Holzland
- Seat: Crossen an der Elster
- Subdivisions: 7 municipalities

Area
  - Total: 120.6 km^{2} (46.6 sq mi)

Population (2025-12-31)
  - Total: 7,579
  - Density: 62.84/km^{2} (162.8/sq mi)
- Time zone: UTC+01:00 (CET)
  - Summer (DST): UTC+02:00 (CEST)
- Website: www.vg-hes.de

Heideland-Elstertal-Schkölen (until January 2012: Heideland-Elstertal) is a Verwaltungsgemeinschaft ("collective municipality") in the district Saale-Holzland, in Thuringia, Germany. The seat of the Verwaltungsgemeinschaft is in Crossen an der Elster.

The Verwaltungsgemeinschaft Heideland-Elstertal-Schkölen consists of the following municipalities:

1. Crossen an der Elster
2. Hartmannsdorf
3. Heideland
4. Rauda
5. Schkölen
6. Silbitz
7. Walpernhain
