= Großröda =

- Ortsteil of Starkenberg
- Interactive map of Großröda
- Location within Germany Location within Thuringia
- Coordinates: 50°59′48″N 12°19′19″E
- Country: Germany
- State: Thuringia
- District: Altenburger Land
- Municipality: Starkenberg

Area
  - Total: 2.67 km^{2} (1.03 sq mi)
- Elevation: 218 m (715 ft)

Population (2010-12-31)
  - Total: 225
  - Density: 84.3/km^{2} (218/sq mi)
- Time zone: UTC+01:00 (CET)
  - Summer (DST): UTC+02:00 (CEST)
- Postal codes: 04617
- Dialling codes: 03448
- Vehicle registration: ABG

Großröda is a village and a former municipality in the district Altenburger Land, in Thuringia, Germany. Since 1 January 2012, it is part of the municipality Starkenberg.
