= Waltersdorf, Thuringia =

Waltersdorf
- Municipality
- Location of Waltersdorf within Saale-Holzland-Kreis district
- Interactive map of Waltersdorf
- Location within Germany Location within Thuringia
- Coordinates: 50°49′53″N 11°44′44″E
- Country: Germany
- State: Thuringia
- District: Saale-Holzland-Kreis
- Municipal assoc.: Hügelland/Täler

Government
  - Mayor (2022–28): Ralf Müller

Area
  - Total: 4.61 km^{2} (1.78 sq mi)
- Elevation: 215 m (705 ft)

Population (2025-12-31)
  - Total: 147
  - Density: 31.9/km^{2} (82.6/sq mi)
- Time zone: UTC+01:00 (CET)
  - Summer (DST): UTC+02:00 (CEST)
- Postal codes: 07646
- Dialling codes: 036428
- Vehicle registration: SHK, EIS, SRO
- Website: www.huegelland-taeler.de

Waltersdorf is a municipality in the district Saale-Holzland, in Thuringia, Germany.
