= Waldeck, Thuringia =

Waldeck
- Municipality
- Location of Waldeck within Saale-Holzland-Kreis district
- Interactive map of Waldeck
- Location within Germany Location within Thuringia
- Coordinates: 50°54′45″N 11°46′58″E
- Country: Germany
- State: Thuringia
- District: Saale-Holzland-Kreis

Government
  - Mayor (2022–28): Susann Bernold

Area
  - Total: 8.01 km^{2} (3.09 sq mi)
- Elevation: 340 m (1,120 ft)

Population (2025-12-31)
  - Total: 218
  - Density: 27.2/km^{2} (70.5/sq mi)
- Time zone: UTC+01:00 (CET)
  - Summer (DST): UTC+02:00 (CEST)
- Postal codes: 07646
- Dialling codes: 036692
- Vehicle registration: SHK, EIS, SRO
- Website: www.bad-klosterlausnitz.de

Waldeck (German pronunciation: [ˈvaldɛk]) is a municipality in the district of Saale-Holzland, in Thuringia, Germany.
