= Albersdorf, Thuringia =

Albersdorf
- Municipality
- Location of Albersdorf within Saale-Holzland-Kreis district
- Interactive map of Albersdorf
- Location within Germany Location within Thuringia
- Coordinates: 50°54′11″N 11°46′28″E
- Country: Germany
- State: Thuringia
- District: Saale-Holzland-Kreis

Government
  - Mayor (2022–28): Torsten Döhler

Area
  - Total: 2.85 km^{2} (1.10 sq mi)
- Elevation: 355 m (1,165 ft)

Population (2025-12-31)
  - Total: 298
  - Density: 105/km^{2} (271/sq mi)
- Time zone: UTC+01:00 (CET)
  - Summer (DST): UTC+02:00 (CEST)
- Postal codes: 07646
- Dialling codes: 036692
- Vehicle registration: SHK, EIS, SRO
- Website: www.bad-klosterlausnitz.de

Albersdorf is a municipality in the Saale-Holzland district of Thuringia, Germany. As of 2018, the population is 288.

Aluerdesdorpe was the original name of the area used when it was first mentioned in 1281, the name meaning 'village of the old custodian'.

== Geography ==
The town Albersdorf is about 15 kilometres (9.3 mi) east of the city centre of Jena and lies in the middle of Thuringian Holzland.
