= Schöps =

- Municipality
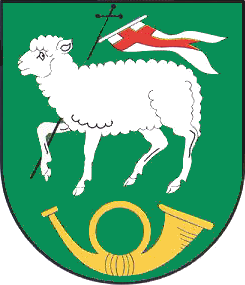
- Coat of arms

- Location of Schöps within Saale-Holzland-Kreis district
- Interactive map of Schöps
- Location within Germany Location within Thuringia
- Coordinates: 50°50′5″N 11°35′52″E
- Country: Germany
- State: Thuringia
- District: Saale-Holzland-Kreis
- Municipal assoc.: Südliches Saaletal

Government
  - Mayor (2022–28): Karsten Rücknagel

Area
  - Total: 4.35 km^{2} (1.68 sq mi)
- Elevation: 158 m (518 ft)

Population (2025-12-31)
  - Total: 287
  - Density: 66.0/km^{2} (171/sq mi)
- Time zone: UTC+01:00 (CET)
  - Summer (DST): UTC+02:00 (CEST)
- Postal codes: 07768
- Dialling codes: 036424
- Vehicle registration: SHK, EIS, SRO
- Website: www.vg-suedliches-saaletal.de

Schöps is a municipality in the district Saale-Holzland, in Thuringia, Germany.
