= Poxdorf, Thuringia =

Poxdorf
- Municipality
- Location of Poxdorf within Saale-Holzland-Kreis district
- Interactive map of Poxdorf
- Location within Germany Location within Thuringia
- Coordinates: 50°57′41″N 11°44′39″E
- Country: Germany
- State: Thuringia
- District: Saale-Holzland-Kreis

Government
  - Mayor (2022–28): Daniel Voigt

Area
  - Total: 4.04 km^{2} (1.56 sq mi)
- Elevation: 240 m (790 ft)

Population (2025-12-31)
  - Total: 94
  - Density: 23/km^{2} (60/sq mi)
- Time zone: UTC+01:00 (CET)
  - Summer (DST): UTC+02:00 (CEST)
- Postal codes: 07616
- Dialling codes: 036692
- Vehicle registration: SHK, EIS, SRO
- Website: www.stadt-buergel.de

Poxdorf (German pronunciation: [ˈpɔksdɔʁf]) is a municipality in the district Saale-Holzland, in Thuringia, Germany.
