= Rausdorf, Thuringia =

Rausdorf
- Municipality
- Location of Rausdorf within Saale-Holzland-Kreis district
- Interactive map of Rausdorf
- Location within Germany Location within Thuringia
- Coordinates: 50°51′29″N 11°41′12″E
- Country: Germany
- State: Thuringia
- District: Saale-Holzland-Kreis
- Municipal assoc.: Hügelland/Täler

Government
  - Mayor (2022–28): Frank Iffland

Area
  - Total: 3.14 km^{2} (1.21 sq mi)
- Elevation: 210 m (690 ft)

Population (2025-12-31)
  - Total: 224
  - Density: 71.3/km^{2} (185/sq mi)
- Time zone: UTC+01:00 (CET)
  - Summer (DST): UTC+02:00 (CEST)
- Postal codes: 07646
- Dialling codes: 036428
- Vehicle registration: SHK, EIS, SRO
- Website: www.huegelland-taeler.de

Rausdorf (German pronunciation: [ˈʁaʊsdɔʁf]) is a municipality in the district Saale-Holzland, in Thuringia, Germany.
