= Möckern, Thuringia =

Möckern
- Municipality
- Location of Möckern within Saale-Holzland-Kreis district
- Interactive map of Möckern
- Location within Germany Location within Thuringia
- Coordinates: 50°51′12″N 11°46′27″E
- Country: Germany
- State: Thuringia
- District: Saale-Holzland-Kreis

Government
  - Mayor (2022–28): Hubert Menzel

Area
  - Total: 5.34 km^{2} (2.06 sq mi)
- Elevation: 285 m (935 ft)

Population (2025-12-31)
  - Total: 106
  - Density: 19.9/km^{2} (51.4/sq mi)
- Time zone: UTC+01:00 (CET)
  - Summer (DST): UTC+02:00 (CEST)
- Postal codes: 07646
- Dialling codes: 036428
- Vehicle registration: SHK, EIS, SRO
- Website: www.stadtroda.de

Möckern (German pronunciation: [ˈmœkɐn]) is a municipality in the district Saale-Holzland, in Thuringia, Germany.
