= Rattelsdorf, Thuringia =

Rattelsdorf
- Municipality
- Location of Rattelsdorf within Saale-Holzland-Kreis district
- Interactive map of Rattelsdorf
- Location within Germany Location within Thuringia
- Coordinates: 50°48′49″N 11°46′23″E
- Country: Germany
- State: Thuringia
- District: Saale-Holzland-Kreis
- Municipal assoc.: Hügelland/Täler

Government
  - Mayor (2022–28): Hartmut Fuchs

Area
  - Total: 3.67 km^{2} (1.42 sq mi)
- Elevation: 280 m (920 ft)

Population (2025-12-31)
  - Total: 72
  - Density: 20/km^{2} (51/sq mi)
- Time zone: UTC+01:00 (CET)
  - Summer (DST): UTC+02:00 (CEST)
- Postal codes: 07646
- Dialling codes: 036426
- Vehicle registration: SHK, EIS, SRO
- Website: www.huegelland-taeler.de

Rattelsdorf (German pronunciation: [ˈʁatl̩sˌdɔʁf]) is a municipality in the district Saale-Holzland, in Thuringia, Germany.
