= Mertendorf, Thuringia =

Mertendorf
- Municipality
- Location of Mertendorf within Saale-Holzland-Kreis district
- Interactive map of Mertendorf
- Location within Germany Location within Thuringia
- Coordinates: 51°0′N 11°47′E
- Country: Germany
- State: Thuringia
- District: Saale-Holzland-Kreis

Government
  - Mayor (2022–28): Frank Treffer

Area
  - Total: 3.79 km^{2} (1.46 sq mi)
- Elevation: 335 m (1,099 ft)

Population (2025-12-31)
  - Total: 127
  - Density: 33.5/km^{2} (86.8/sq mi)
- Time zone: UTC+01:00 (CET)
  - Summer (DST): UTC+02:00 (CEST)
- Postal codes: 07619
- Dialling codes: 036694
- Vehicle registration: SHK, EIS, SRO
- Website: www.mertendorf-thueringen.de

Mertendorf (German pronunciation: [ˈmɛʁtn̩dɔʁf]) is a municipality in the district Saale-Holzland, in Thuringia, Germany.
