= Mörsdorf, Thuringia =

Mörsdorf
- Municipality
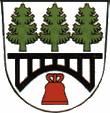
- Coat of arms

- Location of Mörsdorf within Saale-Holzland-Kreis district
- Interactive map of Mörsdorf
- Location within Germany Location within Thuringia
- Coordinates: 50°52′17″N 11°48′1″E
- Country: Germany
- State: Thuringia
- District: Saale-Holzland-Kreis
- Municipal assoc.: Hermsdorf

Government
  - Mayor (2021–27): Sylke Schneider

Area
  - Total: 6.92 km^{2} (2.67 sq mi)
- Elevation: 320 m (1,050 ft)

Population (2025-12-31)
  - Total: 558
  - Density: 80.6/km^{2} (209/sq mi)
- Time zone: UTC+01:00 (CET)
  - Summer (DST): UTC+02:00 (CEST)
- Postal codes: 07646
- Dialling codes: 036428
- Vehicle registration: SHK, EIS, SRO
- Website: www.vg-hermsdorf.de

Mörsdorf is a municipality in the district Saale-Holzland, in Thuringia, Germany.
