= Heideland =

- Municipality
- Location of Heideland within Saale-Holzland-Kreis district
- Interactive map of Heideland
- Location within Germany Location within Thuringia
- Coordinates: 50°57′N 11°56′E
- Country: Germany
- State: Thuringia
- District: Saale-Holzland-Kreis
- Municipal assoc.: Heideland-Elstertal-Schkölen
- Subdivisions: 7

Government
  - Mayor (2022–28): Hans-Rüdiger Pöhl (CDU)

Area
  - Total: 37.55 km^{2} (14.50 sq mi)
- Elevation: 302 m (991 ft)

Population (2025-12-31)
  - Total: 1,738
  - Density: 46.28/km^{2} (119.9/sq mi)
- Time zone: UTC+01:00 (CET)
  - Summer (DST): UTC+02:00 (CEST)
- Postal codes: 07613
- Dialling codes: 036691
- Vehicle registration: SHK, EIS, SRO
- Website: www.heidelandelstertal.de

Heideland (German pronunciation: [ˈhaɪdəlant]) is a municipality in the Saale-Holzland district, in Thuringia, Germany.
