= Wickerstedt =

- Ortsteil of Bad Sulza
- Interactive map of Wickerstedt
- Location within Germany Location within Thuringia
- Coordinates: 51°3′34″N 11°32′37″E
- Country: Germany
- State: Thuringia
- District: Weimarer Land
- Town: Bad Sulza

Area
  - Total: 8.48 km^{2} (3.27 sq mi)

Population (2011-12-31)
  - Total: 765
  - Density: 90.2/km^{2} (234/sq mi)
- Time zone: UTC+01:00 (CET)
  - Summer (DST): UTC+02:00 (CEST)
- Postal codes: 99510
- Dialling codes: 03644
- Vehicle registration: AP
- Website: www.bad-sulza.de

Wickerstedt (German pronunciation: [ˈvɪkɐʃtɛt]) is a village and a former municipality in the Weimarer Land district of Thuringia, Germany. Since 31 December 2012, it has been part of the town Bad Sulza.
