= Serba =

- Municipality
- Location of Serba within Saale-Holzland-Kreis district
- Interactive map of Serba
- Location within Germany Location within Thuringia
- Coordinates: 50°56′36″N 11°48′46″E
- Country: Germany
- State: Thuringia
- District: Saale-Holzland-Kreis
- Subdivisions: 3

Government
  - Mayor (2018–24): Heinz Hebenstreit

Area
  - Total: 7.07 km^{2} (2.73 sq mi)
- Elevation: 300 m (980 ft)

Population (2025-12-31)
  - Total: 665
  - Density: 94.1/km^{2} (244/sq mi)
- Time zone: UTC+01:00 (CET)
  - Summer (DST): UTC+02:00 (CEST)
- Postal codes: 07616
- Dialling codes: 036691
- Vehicle registration: SHK, EIS, SRO
- Website: www.bad-klosterlausnitz.de

Serba is a municipality in the district Saale-Holzland, in Thuringia, Germany.
