= Weißenborn, Thuringia =

Weißenborn
- Municipality
- Location of Weißenborn within Saale-Holzland-Kreis district
- Interactive map of Weißenborn
- Location within Germany Location within Thuringia
- Coordinates: 50°55′18″N 11°52′50″E
- Country: Germany
- State: Thuringia
- District: Saale-Holzland-Kreis

Government
  - Mayor (2020–26): Christiane Putzer

Area
  - Total: 10.13 km^{2} (3.91 sq mi)
- Elevation: 342 m (1,122 ft)

Population (2025-12-31)
  - Total: 1,126
  - Density: 111.2/km^{2} (287.9/sq mi)
- Time zone: UTC+01:00 (CET)
  - Summer (DST): UTC+02:00 (CEST)
- Postal codes: 07639
- Dialling codes: 036601
- Vehicle registration: SHK, EIS, SRO
- Website: www.weissenborn-thueringen.de

Weißenborn (German pronunciation: [ˈvaɪsn̩bɔʁn]) is a municipality in the district Saale-Holzland, in Thuringia, Germany. It is located near the A4 and A9 Motorways.
