= Lehesten, Saale-Holzland =

Lehesten
- Municipality
- Location of Lehesten within Saale-Holzland-Kreis district
- Interactive map of Lehesten
- Location within Germany Location within Thuringia
- Coordinates: 50°58′53″N 11°34′42″E
- Country: Germany
- State: Thuringia
- District: Saale-Holzland-Kreis
- Municipal assoc.: Dornburg-Camburg
- Subdivisions: 4

Government
  - Mayor (2022–28): Michael Döring

Area
  - Total: 12.14 km^{2} (4.69 sq mi)
- Elevation: 260 m (850 ft)

Population (2025-12-31)
  - Total: 648
  - Density: 53.4/km^{2} (138/sq mi)
- Time zone: UTC+01:00 (CET)
  - Summer (DST): UTC+02:00 (CEST)
- Postal codes: 07778
- Dialling codes: 036425
- Vehicle registration: SHK, EIS, SRO
- Website: www.dornburg-saale.de

Lehesten (German pronunciation: [ˈleːəstn̩]) is a municipality in the district Saale-Holzland, in Thuringia, Germany.
