= Tissa, Germany =

Tissa
- Municipality
- Location of Tissa within Saale-Holzland-Kreis district
- Interactive map of Tissa
- Location within Germany Location within Thuringia
- Coordinates: 50°50′48″N 11°44′52″E
- Country: Germany
- State: Thuringia
- District: Saale-Holzland-Kreis
- Municipal assoc.: Hügelland/Täler

Government
  - Mayor (2022–28): Reiner Hartung

Area
  - Total: 4.11 km^{2} (1.59 sq mi)
- Elevation: 270 m (890 ft)

Population (2025-12-31)
  - Total: 140
  - Density: 34/km^{2} (88/sq mi)
- Time zone: UTC+01:00 (CET)
  - Summer (DST): UTC+02:00 (CEST)
- Postal codes: 07646
- Dialling codes: 036428
- Vehicle registration: SHK, EIS, SRO
- Website: www.huegelland-taeler.de

Tissa is a municipality in the district Saale-Holzland, in Thuringia, in the eastern part of Germany.
