= Neuengönna =

- Municipality
- Location of Neuengönna within Saale-Holzland-Kreis district
- Interactive map of Neuengönna
- Location within Germany Location within Thuringia
- Coordinates: 50°59′13″N 11°38′56″E
- Country: Germany
- State: Thuringia
- District: Saale-Holzland-Kreis
- Municipal assoc.: Dornburg-Camburg

Government
  - Mayor (2022–28): Uwe Schwarze

Area
  - Total: 6.17 km^{2} (2.38 sq mi)
- Elevation: 170 m (560 ft)

Population (2025-12-31)
  - Total: 658
  - Density: 107/km^{2} (276/sq mi)
- Time zone: UTC+01:00 (CET)
  - Summer (DST): UTC+02:00 (CEST)
- Postal codes: 07778
- Dialling codes: 036427
- Vehicle registration: SHK, EIS, SRO
- Website: www.dornburg-saale.de

Neuengönna is a municipality in the district Saale-Holzland, in Thuringia, Germany.
