= Ruttersdorf-Lotschen =

- Municipality
- Location of Ruttersdorf-Lotschen within Saale-Holzland-Kreis district
- Interactive map of Ruttersdorf-Lotschen
- Location within Germany Location within Thuringia
- Coordinates: 50°53′09″N 11°44′06″E
- Country: Germany
- State: Thuringia
- District: Saale-Holzland-Kreis

Government
  - Mayor (2022–28): Volker Baumann

Area
  - Total: 8.5 km^{2} (3.3 sq mi)
- Elevation: 250 m (820 ft)

Population (2025-12-31)
  - Total: 327
  - Density: 38/km^{2} (100/sq mi)
- Time zone: UTC+01:00 (CET)
  - Summer (DST): UTC+02:00 (CEST)
- Postal codes: 07646
- Dialling codes: 036428
- Vehicle registration: SHK, EIS, SRO
- Website: www.stadtroda.de

Ruttersdorf-Lotschen is a municipality in the district Saale-Holzland, in Thuringia, Germany.
