= Kleinebersdorf =

- Municipality
- Location of Kleinebersdorf within Saale-Holzland-Kreis district
- Interactive map of Kleinebersdorf
- Location within Germany Location within Thuringia
- Coordinates: 50°49′N 11°50′E
- Country: Germany
- State: Thuringia
- District: Saale-Holzland-Kreis
- Municipal assoc.: Hügelland/Täler

Government
  - Mayor (2022–28): Norbert Heinz

Area
  - Total: 4.01 km^{2} (1.55 sq mi)
- Elevation: 255 m (837 ft)

Population (2025-12-31)
  - Total: 172
  - Density: 42.9/km^{2} (111/sq mi)
- Time zone: UTC+01:00 (CET)
  - Summer (DST): UTC+02:00 (CEST)
- Postal codes: 07646
- Dialling codes: 036426
- Vehicle registration: SHK, EIS, SRO
- Website: www.huegelland- taeler.de

Kleinebersdorf is a municipality in the district Saale-Holzland, in Thuringia, Germany.
