= Holzsußra =

- Municipality
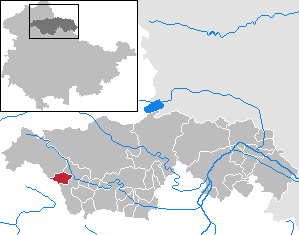
- Location of Holzsußra within Kyffhäuserkreis district
- Interactive map of Holzsußra
- Location within Germany Location within Thuringia
- Coordinates: 51°17′34″N 10°41′38″E
- Country: Germany
- State: Thuringia
- District: Kyffhäuserkreis

Government
  - Mayor (2022–28): Steffen Lupprian (SPD)

Area
  - Total: 9.93 km^{2} (3.83 sq mi)
- Elevation: 255 m (837 ft)

Population (2025-12-31)
  - Total: 268
  - Density: 27.0/km^{2} (69.9/sq mi)
- Time zone: UTC+01:00 (CET)
  - Summer (DST): UTC+02:00 (CEST)
- Postal codes: 99713
- Dialling codes: 036020
- Vehicle registration: KYF

Holzsußra is a municipality in the district Kyffhäuserkreis, in Thuringia, Germany. It is around 40 km northwest of Erfurt and 115 km west of Leipzig.
