= Rauschwitz =

- Municipality
- Location of Rauschwitz within Saale-Holzland-Kreis district
- Interactive map of Rauschwitz
- Location within Germany Location within Thuringia
- Coordinates: 50°58′19″N 11°48′7″E
- Country: Germany
- State: Thuringia
- District: Saale-Holzland-Kreis

Government
  - Mayor (2024–30): Thomas Claus

Area
  - Total: 8.77 km^{2} (3.39 sq mi)
- Elevation: 290 m (950 ft)

Population (2025-12-31)
  - Total: 214
  - Density: 24.4/km^{2} (63.2/sq mi)
- Time zone: UTC+01:00 (CET)
  - Summer (DST): UTC+02:00 (CEST)
- Postal codes: 07616
- Dialling codes: 036692 or 036691
- Vehicle registration: SHK, EIS, SRO
- Website: www.stadt-eisenberg.de

Rauschwitz (German pronunciation: [ˈʁaʊʃvɪts]) is a municipality in the district Saale-Holzland, in Thuringia, Germany.
