= Löberschütz =

- Municipality
- Location of Löberschütz within Saale-Holzland-Kreis district
- Interactive map of Löberschütz
- Location within Germany Location within Thuringia
- Coordinates: 50°57′55″N 11°42′1″E
- Country: Germany
- State: Thuringia
- District: Saale-Holzland-Kreis
- Municipal assoc.: Dornburg-Camburg

Government
  - Mayor (2023–29): Andre Matz

Area
  - Total: 3.07 km^{2} (1.19 sq mi)
- Elevation: 165 m (541 ft)

Population (2025-12-31)
  - Total: 148
  - Density: 48.2/km^{2} (125/sq mi)
- Time zone: UTC+01:00 (CET)
  - Summer (DST): UTC+02:00 (CEST)
- Postal codes: 07751
- Dialling codes: 036427
- Vehicle registration: SHK, EIS, SRO
- Website: www.dornburg-saale.de

Löberschütz is a municipality in the district Saale-Holzland, in Thuringia, Germany.
