= Gerstengrund =

- Municipality
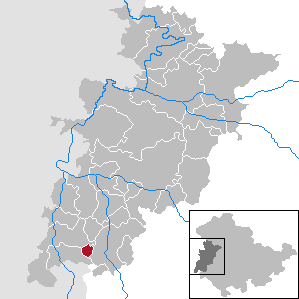
- Location of Gerstengrund within Wartburgkreis district
- Interactive map of Gerstengrund
- Location within Germany Location within Thuringia
- Coordinates: 50°42′N 10°3′E
- Country: Germany
- State: Thuringia
- District: Wartburgkreis

Government
  - Mayor (2022–28): Sascha Völkner (CDU)

Area
  - Total: 4.58 km^{2} (1.77 sq mi)
- Elevation: 500 m (1,600 ft)

Population (2025-12-31)
  - Total: 67
  - Density: 15/km^{2} (38/sq mi)
- Time zone: UTC+01:00 (CET)
  - Summer (DST): UTC+02:00 (CEST)
- Postal codes: 36419
- Dialling codes: 036967
- Vehicle registration: WAK

Gerstengrund is a municipality in the Wartburgkreis district of Thuringia, Germany.
