= Golmsdorf =

- Municipality
- Location of Golmsdorf within Saale-Holzland-Kreis district
- Interactive map of Golmsdorf
- Location within Germany Location within Thuringia
- Coordinates: 50°58′23″N 11°40′05″E
- Country: Germany
- State: Thuringia
- District: Saale-Holzland-Kreis
- Municipal assoc.: Dornburg-Camburg

Government
  - Mayor (2024–30): Benjamin Zollmann

Area
  - Total: 7.61 km^{2} (2.94 sq mi)
- Elevation: 240 m (790 ft)

Population (2025-12-31)
  - Total: 707
  - Density: 92.9/km^{2} (241/sq mi)
- Time zone: UTC+01:00 (CET)
  - Summer (DST): UTC+02:00 (CEST)
- Postal codes: 07751
- Dialling codes: 036427
- Vehicle registration: SHK, EIS, SRO
- Website: www.dornburg-saale.de

Golmsdorf is a municipality in the district Saale-Holzland, in Thuringia, Germany.
