= Seisla =

- Municipality
- Coat of arms

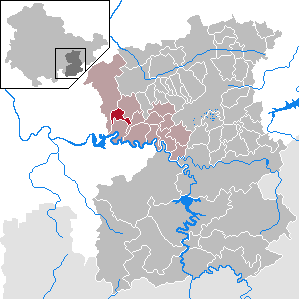
- Location of Seisla within Saale-Orla-Kreis district
- Interactive map of Seisla
- Location within Germany Location within Thuringia
- Coordinates: 50°39′2″N 11°32′5″E
- Country: Germany
- State: Thuringia
- District: Saale-Orla-Kreis
- Municipal assoc.: Ranis-Ziegenrück

Government
  - Mayor (2022–28): Uwe Breternitz

Area
  - Total: 4.47 km^{2} (1.73 sq mi)
- Elevation: 350 m (1,150 ft)

Population (2025-12-31)
  - Total: 119
  - Density: 26.6/km^{2} (69.0/sq mi)
- Time zone: UTC+01:00 (CET)
  - Summer (DST): UTC+02:00 (CEST)
- Postal codes: 07389
- Dialling codes: 03647
- Vehicle registration: SOK
- Website: www.vg-ranis-ziegenrueck.de

Seisla (German pronunciation: [ˈzaɪsla]) is a municipality in the district Saale-Orla-Kreis, in Thuringia, Germany.
