= Friedelshausen =

- Municipality
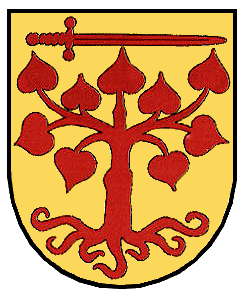
- Coat of arms

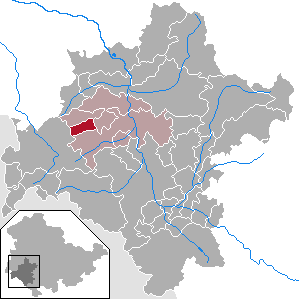
- Location of Friedelshausen within Schmalkalden-Meiningen district
- Interactive map of Friedelshausen
- Location within Germany Location within Thuringia
- Coordinates: 50°40′N 10°13′E
- Country: Germany
- State: Thuringia
- District: Schmalkalden-Meiningen
- Municipal assoc.: Wasungen-Amt Sand

Government
  - Mayor (2022–28): Michael Kirchner

Area
  - Total: 6.91 km^{2} (2.67 sq mi)
- Elevation: 440 m (1,440 ft)

Population (2025-12-31)
  - Total: 271
  - Density: 39.2/km^{2} (102/sq mi)
- Time zone: UTC+01:00 (CET)
  - Summer (DST): UTC+02:00 (CEST)
- Postal codes: 98634
- Dialling codes: 036940
- Vehicle registration: SM
- Website: www.vg-wasungen.de

Friedelshausen is a municipality in the district Schmalkalden-Meiningen, in Thuringia, Germany.
