= Nausnitz =

- Municipality
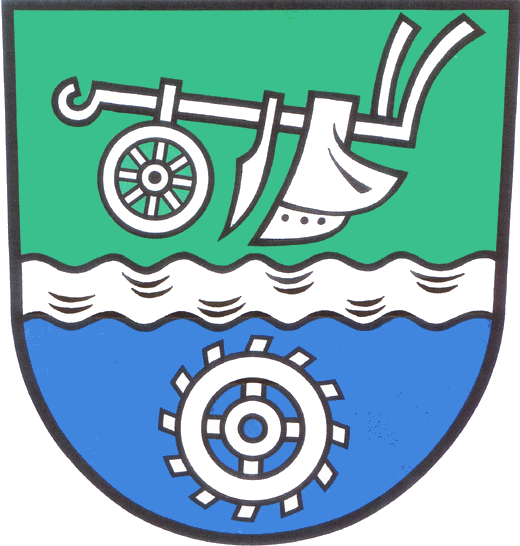
- Coat of arms

- Location of Nausnitz within Saale-Holzland-Kreis district
- Interactive map of Nausnitz
- Location within Germany Location within Thuringia
- Coordinates: 50°56′28″N 11°43′45″E
- Country: Germany
- State: Thuringia
- District: Saale-Holzland-Kreis

Government
  - Mayor (2021–27): Bärbel Bauer

Area
  - Total: 1.42 km^{2} (0.55 sq mi)
- Elevation: 220 m (720 ft)

Population (2025-12-31)
  - Total: 84
  - Density: 59/km^{2} (150/sq mi)
- Time zone: UTC+01:00 (CET)
  - Summer (DST): UTC+02:00 (CEST)
- Postal codes: 07616
- Dialling codes: 036692
- Vehicle registration: SHK, EIS, SRO
- Website: www.stadt-buergel.de

Nausnitz is a municipality in the district Saale-Holzland, in Thuringia, Germany.
