= Plothen =

- Municipality
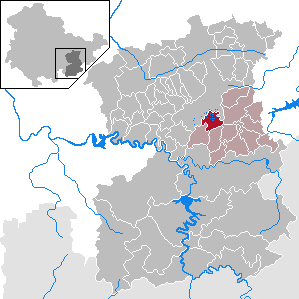
- Location of Plothen within Saale-Orla-Kreis district
- Interactive map of Plothen
- Location within Germany Location within Thuringia
- Coordinates: 50°38′N 11°46′E
- Country: Germany
- State: Thuringia
- District: Saale-Orla-Kreis
- Municipal assoc.: Seenplatte

Government
  - Mayor (2024–30): Dagmar Seidler

Area
  - Total: 8.24 km^{2} (3.18 sq mi)
- Elevation: 470 m (1,540 ft)

Population (2025-12-31)
  - Total: 252
  - Density: 30.6/km^{2} (79.2/sq mi)
- Time zone: UTC+01:00 (CET)
  - Summer (DST): UTC+02:00 (CEST)
- Postal codes: 07907
- Dialling codes: 03663 and 036648
- Vehicle registration: SOK

Plothen (German pronunciation: [ˈploːtn̩]) is a municipality in the district Saale-Orla-Kreis, in Thuringia, Germany.
