= Lipprechterode =

- Municipality
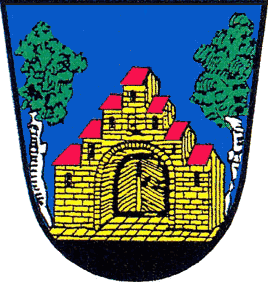
- Coat of arms

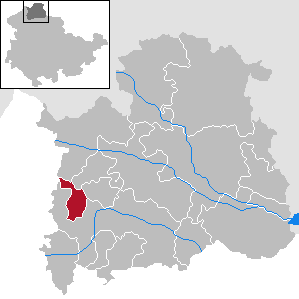
- Location of Lipprechterode within Nordhausen district
- Interactive map of Lipprechterode
- Location within Germany Location within Thuringia
- Coordinates: 51°27′N 10°33′E
- Country: Germany
- State: Thuringia
- District: Nordhausen

Government
  - Mayor (2022–28): Jörg Kirchner

Area
  - Total: 9.73 km^{2} (3.76 sq mi)
- Elevation: 235 m (771 ft)

Population (2025-12-31)
  - Total: 497
  - Density: 51.1/km^{2} (132/sq mi)
- Time zone: UTC+01:00 (CET)
  - Summer (DST): UTC+02:00 (CEST)
- Postal codes: 99752
- Dialling codes: 036338
- Vehicle registration: NDH

Lipprechterode is a municipality in the district of Nordhausen, in Thuringia, Germany.
