= Kleinbockedra =

- Municipality
- Location of Kleinbockedra within Saale-Holzland-Kreis district
- Interactive map of Kleinbockedra
- Location within Germany Location within Thuringia
- Coordinates: 50°50′33″N 11°38′49″E
- Country: Germany
- State: Thuringia
- District: Saale-Holzland-Kreis
- Municipal assoc.: Hügelland/Täler

Government
  - Mayor (2022–28): Lars Koszarek

Area
  - Total: 2.85 km^{2} (1.10 sq mi)
- Elevation: 280 m (920 ft)

Population (2025-12-31)
  - Total: 34
  - Density: 12/km^{2} (31/sq mi)
- Time zone: UTC+01:00 (CET)
  - Summer (DST): UTC+02:00 (CEST)
- Postal codes: 07646
- Dialling codes: 036428
- Vehicle registration: SHK, EIS, SRO
- Website: www.huegelland-taeler.de

Kleinbockedra is a municipality in the district Saale-Holzland, in Thuringia, Germany. With 34 inhabitants at the end of 2019, it is the least populous municipality in what used to be East Germany, although there are 23 municipalities with lesser or equal population in what used to be West Germany. All of the Western municipalities are in either Rhineland-Palatinate (17), or Schleswig-Holstein (6).
