= Thierschneck =

- Municipality
- Location of Thierschneck within Saale-Holzland-Kreis district
- Interactive map of Thierschneck
- Location within Germany Location within Thuringia
- Coordinates: 51°1′57″N 11°45′38″E
- Country: Germany
- State: Thuringia
- District: Saale-Holzland-Kreis
- Municipal assoc.: Dornburg-Camburg

Government
  - Mayor (2022–28): Carla Meierl

Area
  - Total: 2.74 km^{2} (1.06 sq mi)
- Elevation: 305 m (1,001 ft)

Population (2025-12-31)
  - Total: 99
  - Density: 36/km^{2} (94/sq mi)
- Time zone: UTC+01:00 (CET)
  - Summer (DST): UTC+02:00 (CEST)
- Postal codes: 07774
- Dialling codes: 036421
- Vehicle registration: SHK, EIS, SRO
- Website: www.stadt-camburg.de

Thierschneck is a municipality in the district Saale-Holzland, in Thuringia, Germany.
