= Gösen =

- Municipality
- Location of Gösen within Saale-Holzland-Kreis district
- Interactive map of Gösen
- Location within Germany Location within Thuringia
- Coordinates: 50°59′32″N 11°52′34″E
- Country: Germany
- State: Thuringia
- District: Saale-Holzland-Kreis

Government
  - Mayor (2022–28): Beate Heidrich

Area
  - Total: 3.13 km^{2} (1.21 sq mi)
- Elevation: 321 m (1,053 ft)

Population (2025-12-31)
  - Total: 209
  - Density: 66.8/km^{2} (173/sq mi)
- Time zone: UTC+01:00 (CET)
  - Summer (DST): UTC+02:00 (CEST)
- Postal codes: 07607
- Dialling codes: 036691
- Vehicle registration: SHK, EIS, SRO
- Website: www.stadt-eisenberg.de

Gösen (German pronunciation: [ˈɡøːzn̩]) is a municipality in the district Saale-Holzland-Kreis, in Thuringia, Germany.
