= Freienbessingen =

- Municipality
- Coat of arms

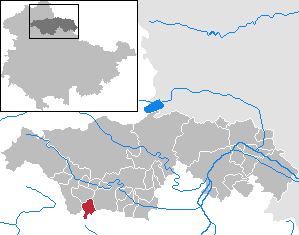
- Location of Freienbessingen within Kyffhäuserkreis district
- Interactive map of Freienbessingen
- Location within Germany Location within Thuringia
- Coordinates: 51°14′N 10°46′E
- Country: Germany
- State: Thuringia
- District: Kyffhäuserkreis

Government
  - Mayor (2020–26): Tino Stennulat

Area
  - Total: 8.75 km^{2} (3.38 sq mi)
- Elevation: 298 m (978 ft)

Population (2025-12-31)
  - Total: 172
  - Density: 19.7/km^{2} (50.9/sq mi)
- Time zone: UTC+01:00 (CET)
  - Summer (DST): UTC+02:00 (CEST)
- Postal codes: 99713
- Dialling codes: 036370
- Vehicle registration: KYF

Freienbessingen is a municipality in the district Kyffhäuserkreis, in Thuringia, Germany.
