= Niedertrebra =

- Municipality
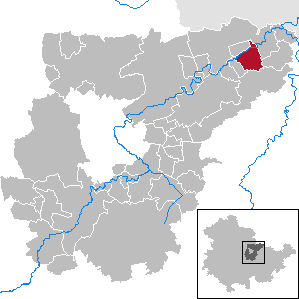
- Location of Niedertrebra within Weimarer Land district
- Interactive map of Niedertrebra
- Location within Germany Location within Thuringia
- Coordinates: 51°4′12″N 11°35′5″E
- Country: Germany
- State: Thuringia
- District: Weimarer Land

Government
  - Mayor (2022–28): Jörg Geyer

Area
  - Total: 8.98 km^{2} (3.47 sq mi)
- Elevation: 138 m (453 ft)

Population (2025-12-31)
  - Total: 757
  - Density: 84.3/km^{2} (218/sq mi)
- Time zone: UTC+01:00 (CET)
  - Summer (DST): UTC+02:00 (CEST)
- Postal codes: 99518
- Dialling codes: 036461
- Vehicle registration: AP
- Website: www.bad-sulza.de

Niedertrebra is a municipality in the Weimarer Land district of Thuringia, Germany.
