= Drognitz =

- Municipality
- Coat of arms

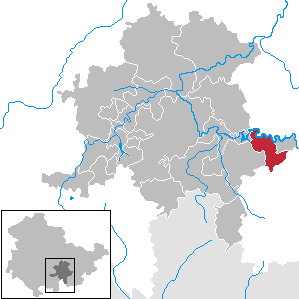
- Location of Drognitz within Saalfeld-Rudolstadt district
- Interactive map of Drognitz
- Location within Germany Location within Thuringia
- Coordinates: 50°34′N 11°34′E
- Country: Germany
- State: Thuringia
- District: Saalfeld-Rudolstadt
- Subdivisions: 4

Government
  - Mayor (2022–28): Tom Zimmermann

Area
  - Total: 24.00 km^{2} (9.27 sq mi)
- Elevation: 510 m (1,670 ft)

Population (2025-12-31)
  - Total: 588
  - Density: 24.5/km^{2} (63.5/sq mi)
- Time zone: UTC+01:00 (CET)
  - Summer (DST): UTC+02:00 (CEST)
- Postal codes: 07338
- Dialling codes: 036737
- Vehicle registration: SLF
- Website: www.drognitz.de

Drognitz is a municipality in the district Saalfeld-Rudolstadt, in Thuringia, Germany.
