= Hainspitz =

- Municipality
- Location of Hainspitz within Saale-Holzland-Kreis district
- Interactive map of Hainspitz
- Location within Germany Location within Thuringia
- Coordinates: 50°57′43″N 11°50′21″E
- Country: Germany
- State: Thuringia
- District: Saale-Holzland-Kreis

Government
  - Mayor (2022–28): Jörg Lehmann

Area
  - Total: 5.28 km^{2} (2.04 sq mi)
- Elevation: 270 m (890 ft)

Population (2025-12-31)
  - Total: 554
  - Density: 105/km^{2} (272/sq mi)
- Time zone: UTC+01:00 (CET)
  - Summer (DST): UTC+02:00 (CEST)
- Postal codes: 07607
- Dialling codes: 036691
- Vehicle registration: SHK, EIS, SRO
- Website: www.hainspitz.de

Hainspitz is a municipality in the district Saale-Holzland, in Thuringia, Germany.
