= Schkölen =

- Town
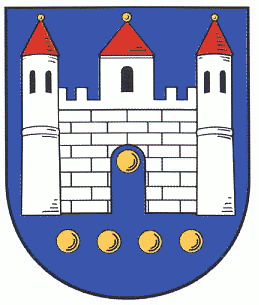
- Coat of arms

- Location of Schkölen within Saale-Holzland-Kreis district
- Interactive map of Schkölen
- Location within Germany Location within Thuringia
- Coordinates: 51°2′N 11°49′E
- Country: Germany
- State: Thuringia
- District: Saale-Holzland-Kreis
- Municipal assoc.: Heideland-Elstertal-Schkölen
- Subdivisions: 15

Government
  - Mayor (2021–27): Martina Ehlers-Tomancova

Area
  - Total: 53.43 km^{2} (20.63 sq mi)
- Elevation: 210 m (690 ft)

Population (2025-12-31)
  - Total: 2,559
  - Density: 47.89/km^{2} (124.0/sq mi)
- Time zone: UTC+01:00 (CET)
  - Summer (DST): UTC+02:00 (CEST)
- Postal codes: 07619
- Dialling codes: 036694
- Vehicle registration: SHK, EIS, SRO
- Website: www.schkoelen.de

Schkölen (German pronunciation: [ˈʃkøːlən]) is a town in the Saale-Holzland district, in Thuringia, Germany. It is situated 12 km south of Naumburg. The village Zschorgula is part of the municipality.
