= Großlöbichau =

- Municipality
- Location of Großlöbichau within Saale-Holzland-Kreis district
- Interactive map of Großlöbichau
- Location within Germany Location within Thuringia
- Coordinates: 50°55′39″N 11°40′43″E
- Country: Germany
- State: Thuringia
- District: Saale-Holzland-Kreis
- Municipal assoc.: Dornburg-Camburg

Government
  - Mayor (2022–28): Anja Isserstedt-Theilig

Area
  - Total: 6.22 km^{2} (2.40 sq mi)
- Elevation: 260 m (850 ft)

Population (2025-12-31)
  - Total: 804
  - Density: 129/km^{2} (335/sq mi)
- Time zone: UTC+01:00 (CET)
  - Summer (DST): UTC+02:00 (CEST)
- Postal codes: 07751
- Dialling codes: 03641
- Vehicle registration: SHK, EIS, SRO
- Website: www.dornburg-saale.de

Großlöbichau is a municipality in the district Saale-Holzland, in Thuringia, Germany.
