= Walpernhain =

- Municipality
- Location of Walpernhain within Saale-Holzland-Kreis district
- Interactive map of Walpernhain
- Location within Germany Location within Thuringia
- Coordinates: 51°1′N 11°57′E
- Country: Germany
- State: Thuringia
- District: Saale-Holzland-Kreis
- Municipal assoc.: Heideland-Elstertal-Schkölen

Government
  - Mayor (2020–26): Günter Weihmann

Area
  - Total: 4.75 km^{2} (1.83 sq mi)
- Elevation: 260 m (850 ft)

Population (2025-12-31)
  - Total: 176
  - Density: 37.1/km^{2} (96.0/sq mi)
- Time zone: UTC+01:00 (CET)
  - Summer (DST): UTC+02:00 (CEST)
- Postal codes: 07613
- Dialling codes: 036691
- Vehicle registration: SHK, EIS, SRO
- Website: www.walpernhain.de

Walpernhain is a municipality in the district Saale-Holzland, in Thuringia, Germany.
