= Graitschen bei Bürgel =

- Municipality
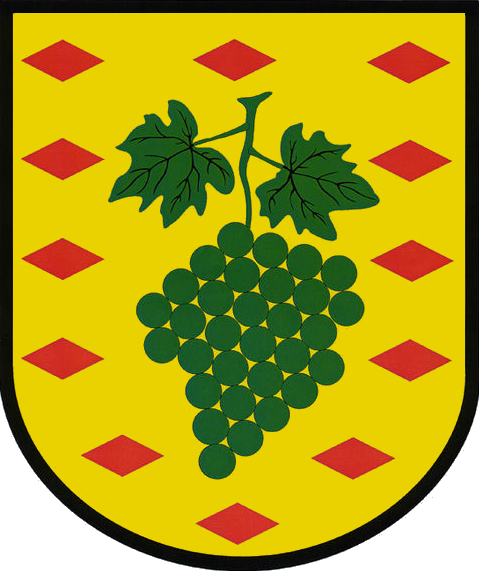
- Coat of arms

- Location of Graitschen bei Bürgel within Saale-Holzland-Kreis district
- Interactive map of Graitschen bei Bürgel
- Location within Germany Location within Thuringia
- Coordinates: 50°57′24″N 11°43′15″E
- Country: Germany
- State: Thuringia
- District: Saale-Holzland-Kreis

Government
  - Mayor (2022–28): Oliver Kroker

Area
  - Total: 4.6 km^{2} (1.8 sq mi)
- Elevation: 181 m (594 ft)

Population (2025-12-31)
  - Total: 384
  - Density: 83/km^{2} (220/sq mi)
- Time zone: UTC+01:00 (CET)
  - Summer (DST): UTC+02:00 (CEST)
- Postal codes: 07616
- Dialling codes: 036692
- Vehicle registration: SHK, EIS, SRO
- Website: www.graitschen.de

Graitschen bei Bürgel is a municipality in the district Saale-Holzland, in Thuringia, Germany.
