= Etzleben =

- Municipality
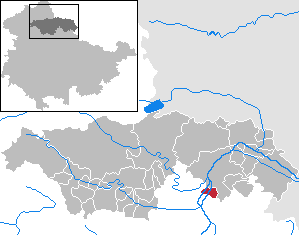
- Location of Etzleben within Kyffhäuserkreis district
- Interactive map of Etzleben
- Location within Germany Location within Thuringia
- Coordinates: 51°15′43″N 11°10′33″E
- Country: Germany
- State: Thuringia
- District: Kyffhäuserkreis

Government
  - Mayor (2020–26): Michael Boldt

Area
  - Total: 6.14 km^{2} (2.37 sq mi)
- Elevation: 130 m (430 ft)

Population (2025-12-31)
  - Total: 262
  - Density: 42.7/km^{2} (111/sq mi)
- Time zone: UTC+01:00 (CET)
  - Summer (DST): UTC+02:00 (CEST)
- Postal codes: 06577
- Dialling codes: 034673
- Vehicle registration: KYF

Etzleben is a municipality in the district Kyffhäuserkreis, in Thuringia, Germany.
