= Kehmstedt =

- Municipality
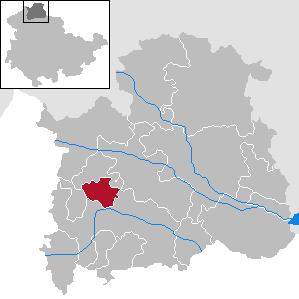
- Location of Kehmstedt within Nordhausen district
- Interactive map of Kehmstedt
- Location within Germany Location within Thuringia
- Coordinates: 51°28′N 10°35′E
- Country: Germany
- State: Thuringia
- District: Nordhausen

Government
  - Mayor (2020–26): Eva-Maria Ostwald

Area
  - Total: 11.41 km^{2} (4.41 sq mi)
- Elevation: 240 m (790 ft)

Population (2025-12-31)
  - Total: 442
  - Density: 38.7/km^{2} (100/sq mi)
- Time zone: UTC+01:00 (CET)
  - Summer (DST): UTC+02:00 (CEST)
- Postal codes: 99752
- Dialling codes: 036338
- Vehicle registration: NDH

Kehmstedt (German pronunciation: [ˈkeːmʃtɛt]) is a municipality in the district of Nordhausen, in Thuringia, Germany.
