= Eineborn =

- Municipality
- Location of Eineborn within Saale-Holzland-Kreis district
- Interactive map of Eineborn
- Location within Germany Location within Thuringia
- Coordinates: 50°49′50″N 11°51′19″E
- Country: Germany
- State: Thuringia
- District: Saale-Holzland-Kreis
- Municipal assoc.: Hügelland/Täler

Government
  - Mayor (2022–28): Bodo Pufe

Area
  - Total: 7.89 km^{2} (3.05 sq mi)
- Elevation: 285 m (935 ft)

Population (2025-12-31)
  - Total: 316
  - Density: 40.1/km^{2} (104/sq mi)
- Time zone: UTC+01:00 (CET)
  - Summer (DST): UTC+02:00 (CEST)
- Postal codes: 07646
- Dialling codes: 036426
- Vehicle registration: SHK, EIS, SRO
- Website: www.huegelland-taeler.de

Eineborn is a municipality in the district Saale-Holzland, in Thuringia, Germany.
