= Silbitz =

- Municipality
- Location of Silbitz within Saale-Holzland-Kreis district
- Interactive map of Silbitz
- Location within Germany Location within Thuringia
- Coordinates: 50°57′N 12°0′E
- Country: Germany
- State: Thuringia
- District: Saale-Holzland-Kreis
- Municipal assoc.: Heideland-Elstertal-Schkölen
- Subdivisions: 2

Government
  - Mayor (2020–26): Silvio Mahl

Area
  - Total: 11.18 km^{2} (4.32 sq mi)
- Elevation: 187 m (614 ft)

Population (2025-12-31)
  - Total: 607
  - Density: 54.3/km^{2} (141/sq mi)
- Time zone: UTC+01:00 (CET)
  - Summer (DST): UTC+02:00 (CEST)
- Postal codes: 07613
- Dialling codes: 036693
- Vehicle registration: SHK, EIS, SRO
- Website: www.heidelandelstertal.de

Silbitz is a municipality in the district Saale-Holzland, in Thuringia, Germany.
