= Weißendorf =

- Municipality
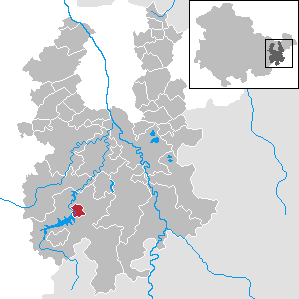
- Location of Weißendorf within Greiz district
- Interactive map of Weißendorf
- Location within Germany Location within Thuringia
- Coordinates: 50°41′N 12°0′E
- Country: Germany
- State: Thuringia
- District: Greiz

Government
  - Mayor (2022–28): Elvira Michel

Area
  - Total: 3.63 km^{2} (1.40 sq mi)
- Elevation: 387 m (1,270 ft)

Population (2025-12-31)
  - Total: 307
  - Density: 84.6/km^{2} (219/sq mi)
- Time zone: UTC+01:00 (CET)
  - Summer (DST): UTC+02:00 (CEST)
- Postal codes: 07950
- Dialling codes: 036622
- Vehicle registration: GRZ
- Website: www.weissendorf.de

Weißendorf (German pronunciation: [ˈvaɪsn̩dɔʁf]) is a municipality in the district of Greiz, in Thuringia, Germany.
