= Hartmannsdorf, Saale-Holzland =

Hartmannsdorf
- Municipality
- Location of Hartmannsdorf within Saale-Holzland-Kreis district
- Interactive map of Hartmannsdorf
- Location within Germany Location within Thuringia
- Coordinates: 50°58′N 11°59′E
- Country: Germany
- State: Thuringia
- District: Saale-Holzland-Kreis
- Municipal assoc.: Heideland-Elstertal-Schkölen

Government
  - Mayor (2024–30): André Böhme

Area
  - Total: 1.62 km^{2} (0.63 sq mi)
- Elevation: 190 m (620 ft)

Population (2025-12-31)
  - Total: 657
  - Density: 406/km^{2} (1,050/sq mi)
- Time zone: UTC+01:00 (CET)
  - Summer (DST): UTC+02:00 (CEST)
- Postal codes: 07613
- Dialling codes: 036693
- Vehicle registration: SHK, EIS, SRO
- Website: www.hartmannsdorf.info

Hartmannsdorf (German pronunciation: [ˈhaʁtmansdɔʁf]) is a municipality in the district Saale-Holzland, in Thuringia, Germany.
