= Schöngleina =

- Municipality
- Location of Schöngleina within Saale-Holzland-Kreis district
- Interactive map of Schöngleina
- Location within Germany Location within Thuringia
- Coordinates: 50°54′32″N 11°43′35″E
- Country: Germany
- State: Thuringia
- District: Saale-Holzland-Kreis

Government
  - Mayor (2022–28): Christian Böttcher

Area
  - Total: 6.77 km^{2} (2.61 sq mi)
- Elevation: 280 m (920 ft)

Population (2025-12-31)
  - Total: 515
  - Density: 76.1/km^{2} (197/sq mi)
- Time zone: UTC+01:00 (CET)
  - Summer (DST): UTC+02:00 (CEST)
- Postal codes: 07646
- Dialling codes: 036428
- Vehicle registration: SHK, EIS, SRO
- Website: www.bad-klosterlausnitz.de

Schöngleina is a municipality in the district Saale-Holzland, in Thuringia, Germany.
