= Tautenhain, Thuringia =

Tautenhain
- Municipality
- Location of Tautenhain within Saale-Holzland-Kreis district
- Interactive map of Tautenhain
- Location within Germany Location within Thuringia
- Coordinates: 50°55′26″N 11°55′5″E
- Country: Germany
- State: Thuringia
- District: Saale-Holzland-Kreis

Government
  - Mayor (2022–28): Daniel Steuer

Area
  - Total: 8.91 km^{2} (3.44 sq mi)
- Elevation: 330 m (1,080 ft)

Population (2025-12-31)
  - Total: 910
  - Density: 100/km^{2} (260/sq mi)
- Time zone: UTC+01:00 (CET)
  - Summer (DST): UTC+02:00 (CEST)
- Postal codes: 07639
- Dialling codes: 036601
- Vehicle registration: SHK, EIS, SRO
- Website: www.bad-klosterlausnitz.de

Tautenhain is a municipality in the district Saale-Holzland, in Thuringia, Germany.
