= Langenwolschendorf =

- Municipality
- Flag Coat of arms

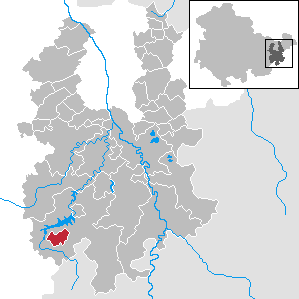
- Location of Langenwolschendorf within Greiz district
- Interactive map of Langenwolschendorf
- Location within Germany Location within Thuringia
- Coordinates: 50°38′N 11°58′E
- Country: Germany
- State: Thuringia
- District: Greiz

Government
  - Mayor (2022–28): Gisbert Voigt (CDU)

Area
  - Total: 6.79 km^{2} (2.62 sq mi)
- Elevation: 440 m (1,440 ft)

Population (2025-12-31)
  - Total: 749
  - Density: 110/km^{2} (286/sq mi)
- Time zone: UTC+01:00 (CET)
  - Summer (DST): UTC+02:00 (CEST)
- Postal codes: 07937
- Dialling codes: 036628
- Vehicle registration: GRZ, ZR
- Website: langenwolschendorf.de

Langenwolschendorf is a municipality in the district of Greiz, in Thuringia, Germany.
