= Großbockedra =

- Municipality
- Location of Großbockedra within Saale-Holzland-Kreis district
- Interactive map of Großbockedra
- Location within Germany Location within Thuringia
- Coordinates: 50°51′N 11°39′E
- Country: Germany
- State: Thuringia
- District: Saale-Holzland-Kreis
- Municipal assoc.: Hügelland/Täler

Government
  - Mayor (2022–28): Tino Mantey

Area
  - Total: 4.6 km^{2} (1.8 sq mi)
- Elevation: 257 m (843 ft)

Population (2025-12-31)
  - Total: 154
  - Density: 33/km^{2} (87/sq mi)
- Time zone: UTC+01:00 (CET)
  - Summer (DST): UTC+02:00 (CEST)
- Postal codes: 07646
- Dialling codes: 036428
- Vehicle registration: SHK, EIS, SRO
- Website: www.huegelland-taeler.de

Großbockedra is a municipality in the district Saale-Holzland, in Thuringia, Germany.
