= Bellstedt =

- Municipality
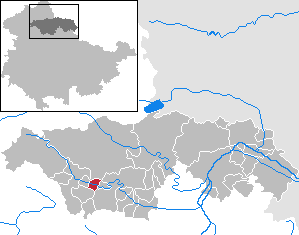
- Location of Bellstedt within Kyffhäuserkreis district
- Interactive map of Bellstedt
- Location within Germany Location within Thuringia
- Coordinates: 51°16′23″N 10°47′18″E
- Country: Germany
- State: Thuringia
- District: Kyffhäuserkreis

Government
  - Mayor (2022–28): Thomas Trietchen

Area
  - Total: 4.77 km^{2} (1.84 sq mi)
- Elevation: 225 m (738 ft)

Population (2025-12-31)
  - Total: 161
  - Density: 33.8/km^{2} (87.4/sq mi)
- Time zone: UTC+01:00 (CET)
  - Summer (DST): UTC+02:00 (CEST)
- Postal codes: 99713
- Dialling codes: 036020
- Vehicle registration: KYF

Bellstedt is a municipality in the district Kyffhäuserkreis, in Thuringia, Germany.
