= Scheiditz =

- Municipality
- Location of Scheiditz within Saale-Holzland-Kreis district
- Interactive map of Scheiditz
- Location within Germany Location within Thuringia
- Coordinates: 50°54′18″N 11°45′15″E
- Country: Germany
- State: Thuringia
- District: Saale-Holzland-Kreis

Government
  - Mayor (2022–28): Uwe Appelt

Area
  - Total: 1.68 km^{2} (0.65 sq mi)
- Elevation: 280 m (920 ft)

Population (2025-12-31)
  - Total: 54
  - Density: 32/km^{2} (83/sq mi)
- Time zone: UTC+01:00 (CET)
  - Summer (DST): UTC+02:00 (CEST)
- Postal codes: 07646
- Dialling codes: 036692
- Vehicle registration: SHK, EIS, SRO
- Website: www.bad-klosterlausnitz.de

Scheiditz is a municipality in the district Saale-Holzland, in Thuringia, Germany.
