= Altenbeuthen =

- Municipality
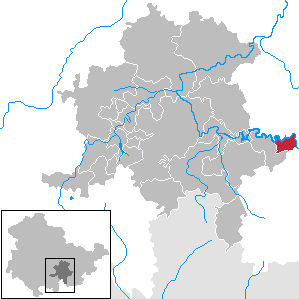
- Location of Altenbeuthen within Saalfeld-Rudolstadt district
- Interactive map of Altenbeuthen
- Location within Germany Location within Thuringia
- Coordinates: 50°36′N 11°35′E
- Country: Germany
- State: Thuringia
- District: Saalfeld-Rudolstadt

Government
  - Mayor (2024–30): Lothar Linke

Area
  - Total: 7.87 km^{2} (3.04 sq mi)
- Elevation: 495 m (1,624 ft)

Population (2025-12-31)
  - Total: 197
  - Density: 25.0/km^{2} (64.8/sq mi)
- Time zone: UTC+01:00 (CET)
  - Summer (DST): UTC+02:00 (CEST)
- Postal codes: 07338
- Dialling codes: 036737
- Vehicle registration: SLF
- Website: www.altenbeuthen.de

Altenbeuthen is a municipality in the district Saalfeld-Rudolstadt, in Thuringia, Germany.

== History ==
Within the German Empire (1871–1918), Altenbeuthen was part of the Prussian Province of Saxony.
