= Auengrund =

- Municipality
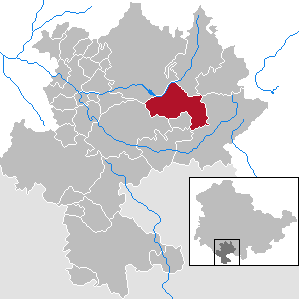
- Location of Auengrund within Hildburghausen district
- Interactive map of Auengrund
- Location within Germany Location within Thuringia
- Coordinates: 50°28′N 10°51′E
- Country: Germany
- State: Thuringia
- District: Hildburghausen
- Subdivisions: 6

Government
  - Mayor (2020–26): René Pfötsch

Area
  - Total: 37.07 km^{2} (14.31 sq mi)
- Elevation: 450 m (1,480 ft)

Population (2025-12-31)
  - Total: 2,765
  - Density: 74.59/km^{2} (193.2/sq mi)
- Time zone: UTC+01:00 (CET)
  - Summer (DST): UTC+02:00 (CEST)
- Postal codes: 98673
- Dialling codes: 03686
- Vehicle registration: HBN
- Website: www.auengrund.de

Auengrund is a municipality in the district of Hildburghausen, in Thuringia, Germany.
