= Frauenprießnitz =

- Municipality
- Location of Frauenprießnitz within Saale-Holzland-Kreis district
- Interactive map of Frauenprießnitz
- Location within Germany Location within Thuringia
- Coordinates: 51°1′2″N 11°44′2″E
- Country: Germany
- State: Thuringia
- District: Saale-Holzland-Kreis
- Municipal assoc.: Dornburg-Camburg

Government
  - Mayor (2022–28): Jürgen Hofmann

Area
  - Total: 18.47 km^{2} (7.13 sq mi)
- Elevation: 320 m (1,050 ft)

Population (2025-12-31)
  - Total: 812
  - Density: 44.0/km^{2} (114/sq mi)
- Time zone: UTC+01:00 (CET)
  - Summer (DST): UTC+02:00 (CEST)
- Postal codes: 07774
- Dialling codes: 036421
- Vehicle registration: SHK, EIS, SRO
- Website: www.gemeinde-frauenpriessnitz.de

Frauenprießnitz is a municipality in the district Saale-Holzland, in Thuringia, Germany.
