= Bad Klosterlausnitz =

- Municipality
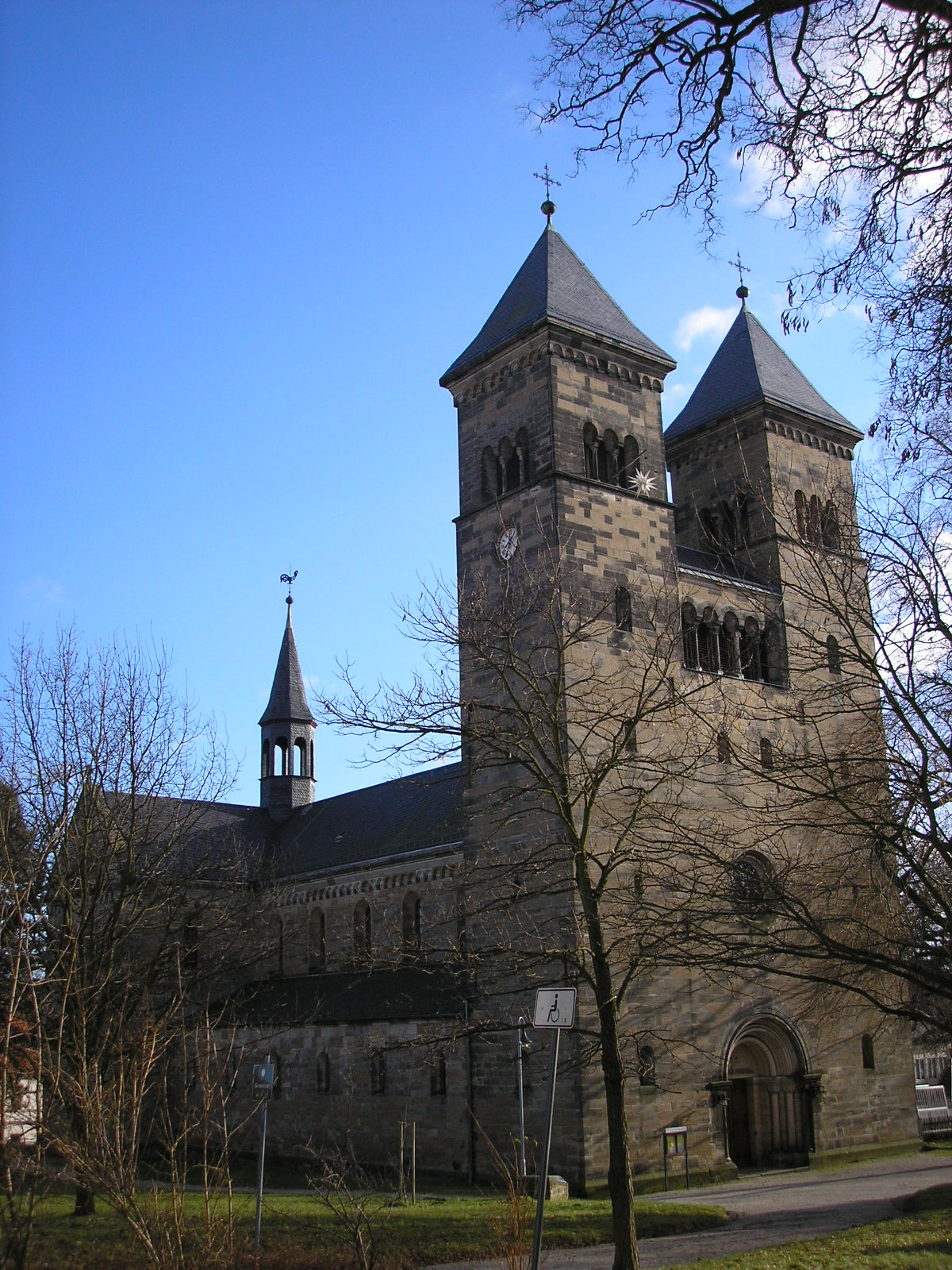
- Monastery church

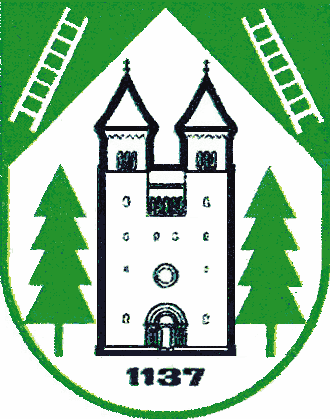
- Coat of arms

- Location of Bad Klosterlausnitz within Saale-Holzland-Kreis district
- Interactive map of Bad Klosterlausnitz
- Location within Germany Location within Thuringia
- Coordinates: 50°55′N 11°52′E
- Country: Germany
- State: Thuringia
- District: Saale-Holzland-Kreis

Government
  - Mayor (2024–30): Kevin Steinbrücker

Area
  - Total: 16.6 km^{2} (6.4 sq mi)
- Elevation: 320 m (1,050 ft)

Population (2025-12-31)
  - Total: 3,399
  - Density: 205/km^{2} (530/sq mi)
- Time zone: UTC+01:00 (CET)
  - Summer (DST): UTC+02:00 (CEST)
- Postal codes: 07639
- Dialling codes: 036601
- Vehicle registration: SHK, EIS, SRO
- Website: www.bad-klosterlausnitz.de

Bad Klosterlausnitz is a municipality in the district Saale-Holzland, in Thuringia, Germany.
