= Eberstedt =

- Municipality
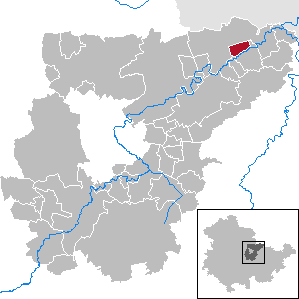
- Location of Eberstedt within Weimarer Land district
- Interactive map of Eberstedt
- Location within Germany Location within Thuringia
- Coordinates: 51°4′27″N 11°34′44″E
- Country: Germany
- State: Thuringia
- District: Weimarer Land

Government
  - Mayor (2022–28): Hans-Otto Sulze

Area
  - Total: 4.13 km^{2} (1.59 sq mi)
- Elevation: 134 m (440 ft)

Population (2025-12-31)
  - Total: 200
  - Density: 48/km^{2} (130/sq mi)
- Time zone: UTC+01:00 (CET)
  - Summer (DST): UTC+02:00 (CEST)
- Postal codes: 99518
- Dialling codes: 036461
- Vehicle registration: AP
- Website: www.bad-sulza.de

Eberstedt is a municipality in the Weimarer Land district of Thuringia, Germany.
