= Petersberg, Thuringia =

Petersberg
- Municipality
- Location of Petersberg within Saale-Holzland-Kreis district
- Interactive map of Petersberg
- Location within Germany Location within Thuringia
- Coordinates: 50°59′5″N 11°50′3″E
- Country: Germany
- State: Thuringia
- District: Saale-Holzland-Kreis

Government
  - Mayor (2022–28): Manuela Ewald

Area
  - Total: 8.37 km^{2} (3.23 sq mi)
- Elevation: 250 m (820 ft)

Population (2025-12-31)
  - Total: 284
  - Density: 33.9/km^{2} (87.9/sq mi)
- Time zone: UTC+01:00 (CET)
  - Summer (DST): UTC+02:00 (CEST)
- Postal codes: 07616
- Dialling codes: 036691
- Vehicle registration: SHK, EIS, SRO
- Website: www.stadt-eisenberg.de

Petersberg (German pronunciation: [ˈpeːtɐsbɛʁk]) is a municipality in the district Saale-Holzland, in Thuringia, Germany.
