= Sickerode =

- Municipality
- Coat of arms

- Location of Sickerode within Eichsfeld district
- Interactive map of Sickerode
- Location within Germany Location within Thuringia
- Coordinates: 51°15′8″N 10°7′18″E
- Country: Germany
- State: Thuringia
- District: Eichsfeld
- Municipal assoc.: Ershausen/Geismar

Government
  - Mayor (2019–25): Thiemo Weinrich

Area
  - Total: 2.00 km^{2} (0.77 sq mi)
- Elevation: 230 m (750 ft)

Population (2025-12-31)
  - Total: 136
  - Density: 68.0/km^{2} (176/sq mi)
- Time zone: UTC+01:00 (CET)
  - Summer (DST): UTC+02:00 (CEST)
- Postal codes: 37308
- Dialling codes: 036082
- Vehicle registration: EIC
- Website: www.ershausen-geismar.de

Sickerode is a municipality in the district of Eichsfeld in Thuringia, Germany.
