= Jenalöbnitz =

- Municipality
- Location of Jenalöbnitz within Saale-Holzland-Kreis district
- Interactive map of Jenalöbnitz
- Location within Germany Location within Thuringia
- Coordinates: 50°56′56″N 11°41′31″E
- Country: Germany
- State: Thuringia
- District: Saale-Holzland-Kreis
- Municipal assoc.: Dornburg-Camburg

Government
  - Mayor (2022–28): Torsten Deppner

Area
  - Total: 3.94 km^{2} (1.52 sq mi)
- Elevation: 208 m (682 ft)

Population (2025-12-31)
  - Total: 156
  - Density: 39.6/km^{2} (103/sq mi)
- Time zone: UTC+01:00 (CET)
  - Summer (DST): UTC+02:00 (CEST)
- Postal codes: 07751
- Dialling codes: 03641
- Vehicle registration: SHK, EIS, SRO
- Website: www.dornburg-saale.de

Jenalöbnitz is a municipality in the district Saale-Holzland, in Thuringia, Germany.

== History ==
Jenalöbnitz was first mentioned in the year 1220, when a document mentions a citizen as a witness in a trial. The village itself was first mentioned in 1395, when it was sold to the municipality of Jena.

Archaeological research has found traces of celtic settlements as old as 1500 B.C.E. In the following centuries, settlements by thuringian and Slavic groups are confirmed. Remains of a Slavic castle, called "der Bühl", are only visible as a small mound.

Medieval houses with regional building styles and decorative woodworking are still present in today's village. The church, built around 1395, is the center of Jenalöbnitz.

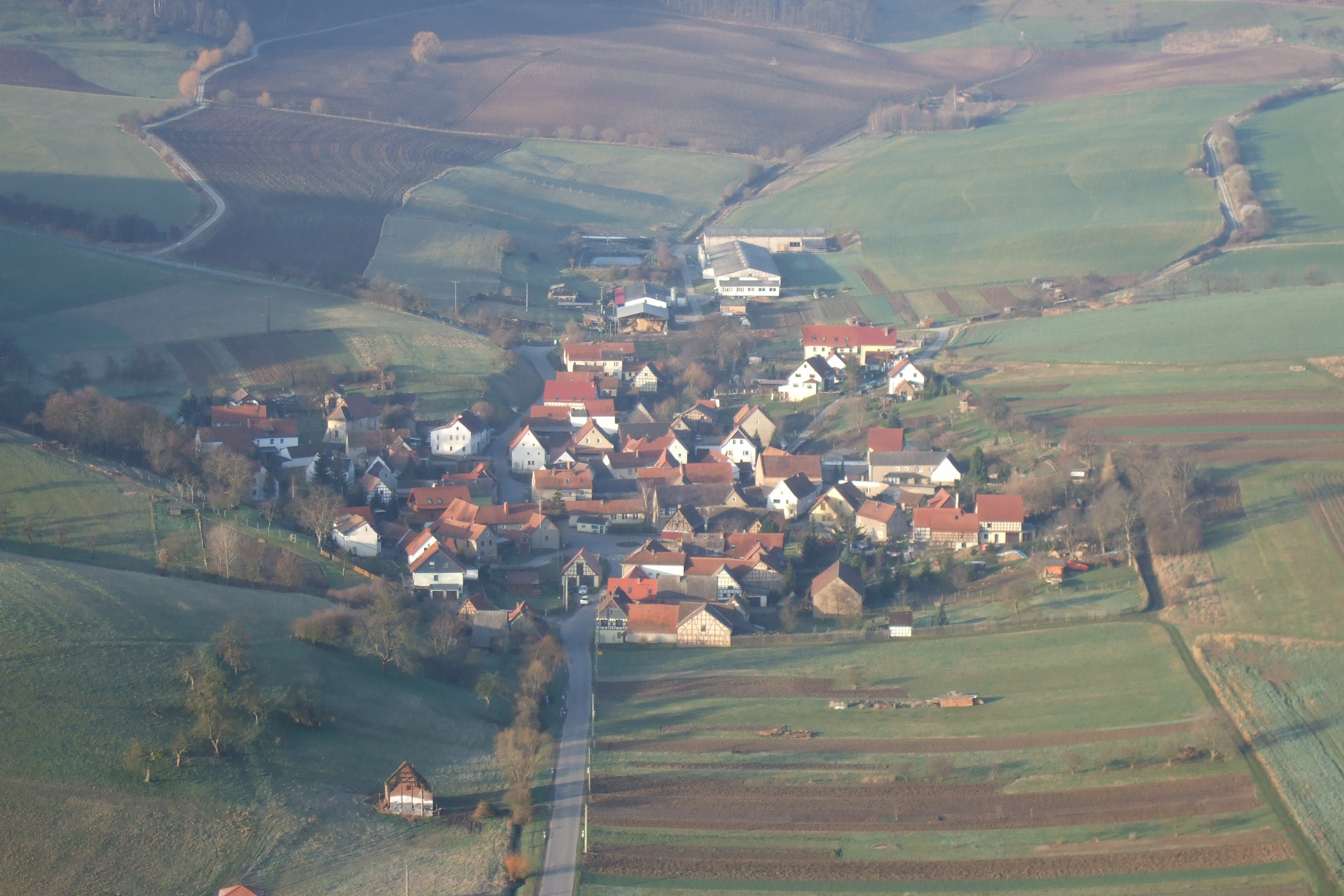
view over the village

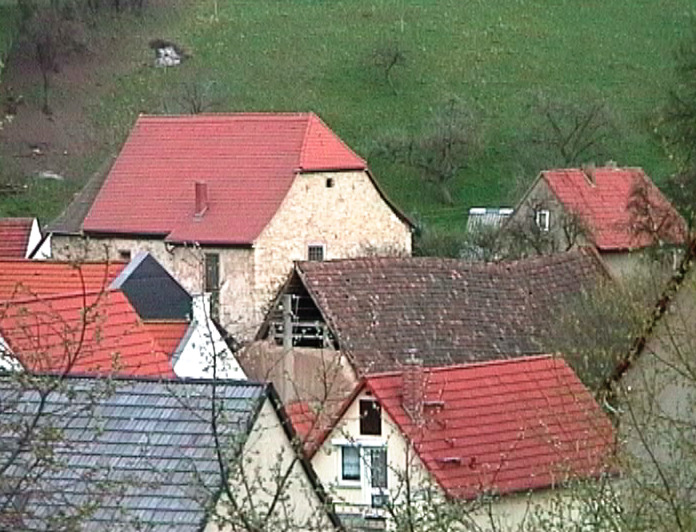
old church and surrounding historical homes

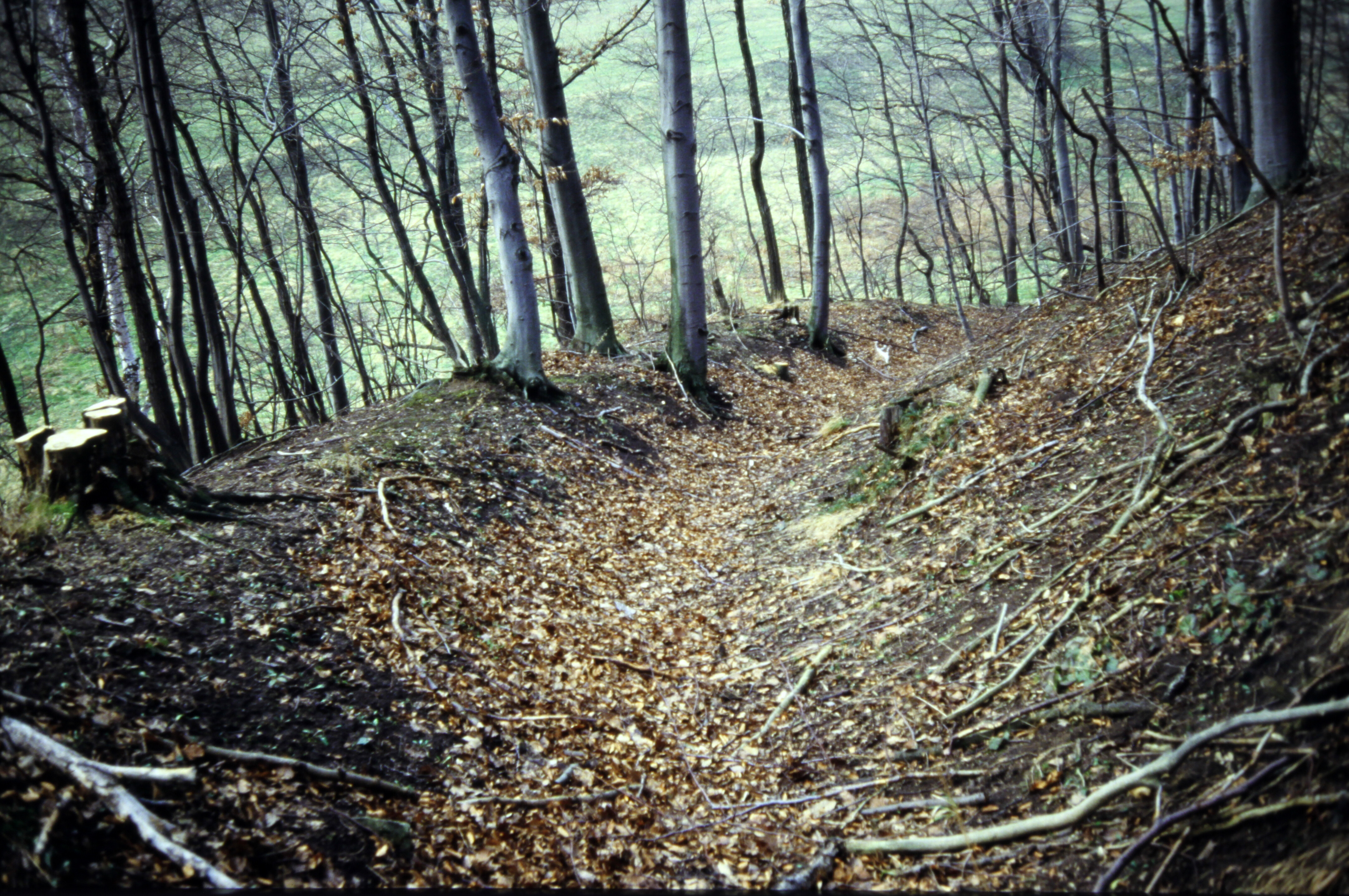
traces of Slavic settlements
