= Bobeck =

- Municipality
- Location of Bobeck within Saale-Holzland-Kreis district
- Interactive map of Bobeck
- Location within Germany Location within Thuringia
- Coordinates: 50°54′12″N 11°47′36″E
- Country: Germany
- State: Thuringia
- District: Saale-Holzland-Kreis

Government
  - Mayor (2022–28): Falk Brückner

Area
  - Total: 7.11 km^{2} (2.75 sq mi)
- Elevation: 360 m (1,180 ft)

Population (2025-12-31)
  - Total: 262
  - Density: 36.8/km^{2} (95.4/sq mi)
- Time zone: UTC+01:00 (CET)
  - Summer (DST): UTC+02:00 (CEST)
- Postal codes: 07646
- Dialling codes: 036692
- Vehicle registration: SHK, EIS, SRO
- Website: www.bad-klosterlausnitz.de

Bobeck is a municipality in the district Saale-Holzland, in Thuringia, Germany.
