= Rauda =

- Municipality
- Location of Rauda within Saale-Holzland-Kreis district
- Interactive map of Rauda
- Location within Germany Location within Thuringia
- Coordinates: 50°57′N 11°56′E
- Country: Germany
- State: Thuringia
- District: Saale-Holzland-Kreis
- Municipal assoc.: Heideland-Elstertal-Schkölen

Government
  - Mayor (2022–28): Hans-Jürgen Dietrich (CDU)

Area
  - Total: 3.07 km^{2} (1.19 sq mi)
- Elevation: 197 m (646 ft)

Population (2025-12-31)
  - Total: 274
  - Density: 89.3/km^{2} (231/sq mi)
- Time zone: UTC+01:00 (CET)
  - Summer (DST): UTC+02:00 (CEST)
- Postal codes: 07613
- Dialling codes: 036691
- Vehicle registration: SHK, EIS, SRO
- Website: www.heidelandelstertal.de

Rauda (German pronunciation: [ˈʁaʊda]) is a municipality in the district Saale-Holzland, in Thuringia, Germany.
