= Dietzenrode-Vatterode =

- Municipality
- Coat of arms

- Location of Dietzenrode-Vatterode within Eichsfeld district
- Interactive map of Dietzenrode-Vatterode
- Location within Germany Location within Thuringia
- Coordinates: 51°18′28″N 10°2′2″E
- Country: Germany
- State: Thuringia
- District: Eichsfeld

Government
  - Mayor (2022–28): Walter Homburg

Area
  - Total: 5.78 km^{2} (2.23 sq mi)
- Elevation: 230 m (750 ft)

Population (2025-12-31)
  - Total: 125
  - Density: 21.6/km^{2} (56.0/sq mi)
- Time zone: UTC+01:00 (CET)
  - Summer (DST): UTC+02:00 (CEST)
- Postal codes: 37318
- Dialling codes: 036087
- Vehicle registration: EIC

Dietzenrode-Vatterode (German pronunciation: [diːtsn̩ˈʁoːdə fatəˈʁoːdə]) is a municipality in the district of Eichsfeld in Thuringia, Germany.
