= Tautenburg =

- Municipality
- Location of Tautenburg within Saale-Holzland-Kreis district
- Interactive map of Tautenburg
- Location within Germany Location within Thuringia
- Coordinates: 50°59′26″N 11°42′56″E
- Country: Germany
- State: Thuringia
- District: Saale-Holzland-Kreis
- Municipal assoc.: Dornburg-Camburg

Government
  - Mayor (2021–27): Wolf-Ullrich Weber

Area
  - Total: 12.75 km^{2} (4.92 sq mi)
- Elevation: 230 m (750 ft)

Population (2025-12-31)
  - Total: 276
  - Density: 21.6/km^{2} (56.1/sq mi)
- Time zone: UTC+01:00 (CET)
  - Summer (DST): UTC+02:00 (CEST)
- Postal codes: 07778
- Dialling codes: 036427
- Vehicle registration: SHK, EIS, SRO

Tautenburg (German pronunciation: [ˈtaʊtn̩bʊʁk]) is a municipality in the district Saale-Holzland, in Thuringia, Germany. It is home to the Karl Schwarzschild Observatory.
