= Oberbodnitz =

- Municipality
- Location of Oberbodnitz within Saale-Holzland-Kreis district
- Interactive map of Oberbodnitz
- Location within Germany Location within Thuringia
- Coordinates: 50°48′42″N 11°39′32″E
- Country: Germany
- State: Thuringia
- District: Saale-Holzland-Kreis
- Municipal assoc.: Hügelland/Täler

Government
  - Mayor (2022–28): Roland Burkhardt

Area
  - Total: 6.51 km^{2} (2.51 sq mi)
- Elevation: 270 m (890 ft)

Population (2025-12-31)
  - Total: 233
  - Density: 35.8/km^{2} (92.7/sq mi)
- Time zone: UTC+01:00 (CET)
  - Summer (DST): UTC+02:00 (CEST)
- Postal codes: 07646
- Dialling codes: 036424
- Vehicle registration: SHK, EIS, SRO
- Website: www.huegelland-taeler.de

Oberbodnitz is a municipality in the district Saale-Holzland, in Thuringia, Germany.
