= Gierstädt =

- Municipality
- Location of Gierstädt within Gotha district
- Interactive map of Gierstädt
- Location within Germany Location within Thuringia
- Coordinates: 51°2′35″N 10°49′38″E
- Country: Germany
- State: Thuringia
- District: Gotha
- Municipal assoc.: Fahner Höhe

Government
  - Mayor (2022–28): Ulf Henniger

Area
  - Total: 10.6 km^{2} (4.1 sq mi)
- Elevation: 245 m (804 ft)

Population (2025-12-31)
  - Total: 811
  - Density: 76.5/km^{2} (198/sq mi)
- Time zone: UTC+01:00 (CET)
  - Summer (DST): UTC+02:00 (CEST)
- Postal codes: 99100
- Dialling codes: 036206
- Vehicle registration: GTH
- Website: www.vg-fahner-hoehe.de

Gierstädt (German pronunciation: [ˈɡiːɐ̯ʃtɛt]) is a municipality in the district of Gotha, in Thuringia, Germany.
