= Schlöben =

- Municipality
- Location of Schlöben within Saale-Holzland-Kreis district
- Interactive map of Schlöben
- Location within Germany Location within Thuringia
- Coordinates: 50°53′35″N 11°41′21″E
- Country: Germany
- State: Thuringia
- District: Saale-Holzland-Kreis

Government
  - Mayor (2022–28): Hans-Peter Perschke

Area
  - Total: 15.89 km^{2} (6.14 sq mi)
- Elevation: 240 m (790 ft)

Population (2025-12-31)
  - Total: 892
  - Density: 56.1/km^{2} (145/sq mi)
- Time zone: UTC+01:00 (CET)
  - Summer (DST): UTC+02:00 (CEST)
- Postal codes: 07646
- Dialling codes: 036428
- Vehicle registration: SHK, EIS, SRO
- Website: www.bad-klosterlausnitz.de

Schlöben is a municipality in the district Saale-Holzland, in Thuringia, Germany.
