= Meusebach =

- Municipality
- Location of Meusebach within Saale-Holzland-Kreis district
- Interactive map of Meusebach
- Location within Germany Location within Thuringia
- Coordinates: 50°49′N 11°44′E
- Country: Germany
- State: Thuringia
- District: Saale-Holzland-Kreis
- Municipal assoc.: Hügelland/Täler

Government
  - Mayor (2022–28): Silke Höntsch

Area
  - Total: 6.2 km^{2} (2.4 sq mi)
- Elevation: 260 m (850 ft)

Population (2025-12-31)
  - Total: 88
  - Density: 14/km^{2} (37/sq mi)
- Time zone: UTC+01:00 (CET)
  - Summer (DST): UTC+02:00 (CEST)
- Postal codes: 07646
- Dialling codes: 036428
- Vehicle registration: SHK, EIS, SRO
- Website: www.huegelland-taeler.de

Meusebach is a municipality in the district Saale-Holzland, in Thuringia, Germany.
