= Sülzfeld =

- Stadtteil of Meiningen
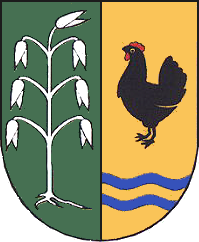
- Coat of arms
- Interactive map of Sülzfeld
- Location within Germany Location within Thuringia
- Coordinates: 50°32′N 10°22′E
- Country: Germany
- State: Thuringia
- District: Schmalkalden-Meiningen
- Town: Meiningen

Area
  - Total: 17.39 km^{2} (6.71 sq mi)
- Elevation: 325 m (1,066 ft)

Population (2022-12-31)
  - Total: 837
  - Density: 48.1/km^{2} (125/sq mi)
- Time zone: UTC+01:00 (CET)
  - Summer (DST): UTC+02:00 (CEST)
- Postal codes: 98617
- Dialling codes: 036945

Sülzfeld (German pronunciation: [ˈzʏltsˌfɛlt]) is a village and a former municipality in the district Schmalkalden-Meiningen, in Thuringia, Germany. On 1 January 2024 it became part of the town Meiningen.
