= Unterbodnitz =

- Municipality
- Location of Unterbodnitz within Saale-Holzland-Kreis district
- Interactive map of Unterbodnitz
- Location within Germany Location within Thuringia
- Coordinates: 50°49′17″N 11°38′54″E
- Country: Germany
- State: Thuringia
- District: Saale-Holzland-Kreis
- Municipal assoc.: Südliches Saaletal

Government
  - Mayor (2022–28): Sven Kraft

Area
  - Total: 5.55 km^{2} (2.14 sq mi)
- Elevation: 230 m (750 ft)

Population (2025-12-31)
  - Total: 193
  - Density: 34.8/km^{2} (90.1/sq mi)
- Time zone: UTC+01:00 (CET)
  - Summer (DST): UTC+02:00 (CEST)
- Postal codes: 07646
- Dialling codes: 036424
- Vehicle registration: SHK, EIS, SRO
- Website: www.vg-suedliches-saaletal.de

Unterbodnitz is a municipality in the district Saale-Holzland, in Thuringia, Germany.
