= Erbenhausen =

- Municipality
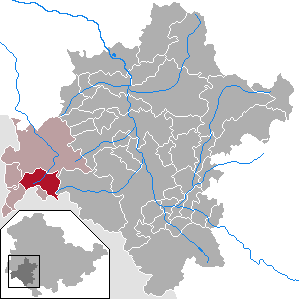
- Location of Erbenhausen within Schmalkalden-Meiningen district
- Interactive map of Erbenhausen
- Location within Germany Location within Thuringia
- Coordinates: 50°34′N 10°9′E
- Country: Germany
- State: Thuringia
- District: Schmalkalden-Meiningen
- Municipal assoc.: Hohe Rhön
- Subdivisions: 3

Government
  - Mayor (2020–26): Tino Scherer

Area
  - Total: 20.68 km^{2} (7.98 sq mi)
- Elevation: 502 m (1,647 ft)

Population (2025-12-31)
  - Total: 541
  - Density: 26.2/km^{2} (67.8/sq mi)
- Time zone: UTC+01:00 (CET)
  - Summer (DST): UTC+02:00 (CEST)
- Postal codes: 98634
- Dialling codes: 036946
- Vehicle registration: SM
- Website: www.vgem-hoherhoen.de

Erbenhausen is a municipality in the district Schmalkalden-Meiningen, in Thuringia, Germany.
