= Obertrebra =

- Municipality
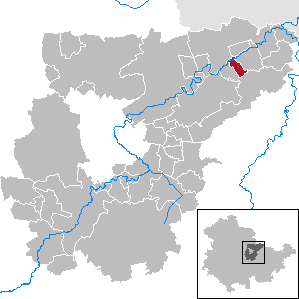
- Location of Obertrebra within Weimarer Land district
- Interactive map of Obertrebra
- Location within Germany Location within Thuringia
- Coordinates: 51°3′47″N 11°34′10″E
- Country: Germany
- State: Thuringia
- District: Weimarer Land

Government
  - Mayor (2022–28): Dieter Feldrappe

Area
  - Total: 3.23 km^{2} (1.25 sq mi)
- Elevation: 140 m (460 ft)

Population (2025-12-31)
  - Total: 236
  - Density: 73.1/km^{2} (189/sq mi)
- Time zone: UTC+01:00 (CET)
  - Summer (DST): UTC+02:00 (CEST)
- Postal codes: 99510
- Dialling codes: 03644
- Vehicle registration: AP
- Website: www.bad-sulza.de

Obertrebra is a municipality in the Weimarer Land district of Thuringia, Germany.
