= Grammetal (Verwaltungsgemeinschaft) =

Coordinates: 50.956°N 11.221°E

Grammetal is a former Verwaltungsgemeinschaft in the district Weimarer Land in Thuringia, Germany. The seat of the Verwaltungsgemeinschaft was in Isseroda. It was disbanded in December 2019, when its members merged into the new municipality Grammetal.

The Verwaltungsgemeinschaft Grammetal consisted of the following municipalities:

1. Bechstedtstraß
2. Daasdorf am Berge
3. Hopfgarten
4. Isseroda
5. Mönchenholzhausen
6. Niederzimmern
7. Nohra
8. Ottstedt am Berge
9. Troistedt
