= List of windmills in Thuringia =

A list of windmills in the German state of Thuringia

Location	Name of mill	Type	Built	Notes	Photograph
Altenbeichlingen		Turmholländer		Muehlen Archiv (German)	
Aschara		Erdholländer		Muehlen Archiv (German)	
Auma		Turmholländer		Stump; Muehlen Archiv (German)	
Bachra		Turmholländer		Muehlen Archiv (German)	
Ballstädt		Bockwindmühle		Restored; Muehlen Archiv (German)	
Bechstedtstraß		Bockwindmühle		Muehlen Archiv (German)	
Bottendorf		Turmholländer		Muehlen Archiv (German)	
Bucha		Turmholländer		House conversion Muehlen Archiv (German)	
Bufleben		Bockwindmühle		Muehlen Archiv (German)	
Buttstädt		Turmholländer		Stump; Muehlen Archiv (German)	
Dittersdorf		Turmholländer		Muehlen Archiv (German)	
Dittrichshütte		Turmholländer		Muehlen Archiv (German)	
Döllstädt		Turmholländer		Stump; Muehlen Archiv (German)	
Donndorf-Langenroda		Bockwindmühle		Muehlen Archiv (German)	
Eliasbrunn		Turmholländer		Muehlen Archiv (German)	
Eßleben		Turmholländer		Muehlen Archiv (German)	
Frauenprießnitz		Turmholländer		Muehlen Archiv (German)	
Gera-Bieblach		Turmholländer		Muehlen Archiv (German)	
Gera-Kleinaga		Turmholländer		Muehlen Archiv (German)	
Hauteroda		Turmholländer		Muehlen Archiv (German)	
Heichelheim		Turmholländer		Muehlen Archiv (German)	
Hopfgarten		Turmholländer		House conversion Muehlen Archiv (German)	
Immenrode		Turmholländer		Muehlen Archiv (German)	
Jena-Krippendorf		Bockwindmühle		Restored; Muehlen Archiv (German)	
Kleinfahner		Bockwindmühle		Muehlen Archiv (German)	
Klettbach		Bockwindmühle		Blown down 18 February 2022. Muehlen Archiv (German)	
Kraftsdorf-Rüdersdorf		Turmholländer		House conversion Muehlen Archiv (German)	
Linda		Galerieholländer		Restored; Muehlen Archiv (German)	
Lumpzig		Bockwindmühle		Muehlen Archiv (German)	
Mittelpöllnitz		Bockwindmühle		Muehlen Archiv (German)	
Mühlhausen		Turmholländer		Muehlen Archiv (German)	
Nermsdorf		Turmholländer		Muehlen Archiv (German)	
Obermehla-Großmehlra		Bockwindmühle		Muehlen Archiv (German)	
Obermehla-Großmehlra		Turmholländer		House conversion Muehlen Archiv (German)	
Obernissa		Bockwindmühle		Muehlen Archiv (German)	
Oberreißen		Turmholländer		Muehlen Archiv (German)	
Petersberg-Kischlitz		Turmholländer		Muehlen Archiv (German)	
Pölzig		Bockwindmühle		Incorporated into engine driven mill. Muehlen Archiv (German)	
Ranis		Turmholländer		Incorporated into engine driven mill. Muehlen Archiv (German)	
Rückersdorf-Haselbach		Bockwindmühle		Muehlen Archiv (German)	
Schillingstedt		Bockwindmühle		Restored; Muehlen Archiv (German)	
Schloßvippach		Turmholländer		Muehlen Archiv (German)	
Schlotheim		Turmholländer		Muehlen Archiv (German)	
Schmiedehausen		Turmholländer		Muehlen Archiv (German)	
Sprötau		Turmholländer		Muehlen Archiv (German)	
Suhl		Turmholländer		Muehlen Archiv (German)	
Tischendorf		Bockwindmühle		Muehlen Archiv (German)	
Triptis		Turmholländer		Muehlen Archiv (German)	
Tüngeda		Bockwindmühle		Restored; Muehlen Archiv (German)	
Weimar		Turmholländer		House conversion Muehlen Archiv (German)	
Weira		Turmholländer		Muehlen Archiv (German)	
Weißensee		Turmholländer		Muehlen Archiv (German)	
Wildenbörten		Turmholländer		Muehlen Archiv (German)	
Windeberg		Turmholländer		Muehlen Archiv (German)	
Zeulenroda		Turmholländer		House conversion Muehlen Archiv (German)	
Zeulenroda-Niederböhmersdorf		Paltrockmühle		Muehlen Archiv (German)	
