= Ottstedt am Berge =

- Ortsteil of Grammetal
- Interactive map of Ottstedt am Berge
- Location within Germany Location within Thuringia
- Coordinates: 51°1′2″N 11°12′49″E
- Country: Germany
- State: Thuringia
- District: Weimarer Land
- Municipality: Grammetal

Area
  - Total: 5.11 km^{2} (1.97 sq mi)
- Elevation: 240 m (790 ft)

Population (2018-12-31)
  - Total: 241
  - Density: 47.2/km^{2} (122/sq mi)
- Time zone: UTC+01:00 (CET)
  - Summer (DST): UTC+02:00 (CEST)
- Postal codes: 99428
- Dialling codes: 036203
- Vehicle registration: AP

Ottstedt am Berge (German pronunciation: [ˈɔtʃtɛt ʔam ˈbɛʁɡə], lit. 'Ottstedt on the Mountain') is a village and a former municipality in the Weimarer Land district of Thuringia, Germany. Since December 2019, it is part of the municipality Grammetal.

== Geography ==
Ottstedt lies approximately ten kilometers northeast of the state capital Erfurt and ten kilometers northwest of Weimar on the southwestern slope of the Ettersberg hill, where the Buchenwald concentration camp once stood.

Neighboring municipalities and towns include Hopfgarten, Niederzimmern, Ollendorf, Am Ettersberg, and the city of Weimar.
