= Gebstedt =

- Ortsteil of Bad Sulza
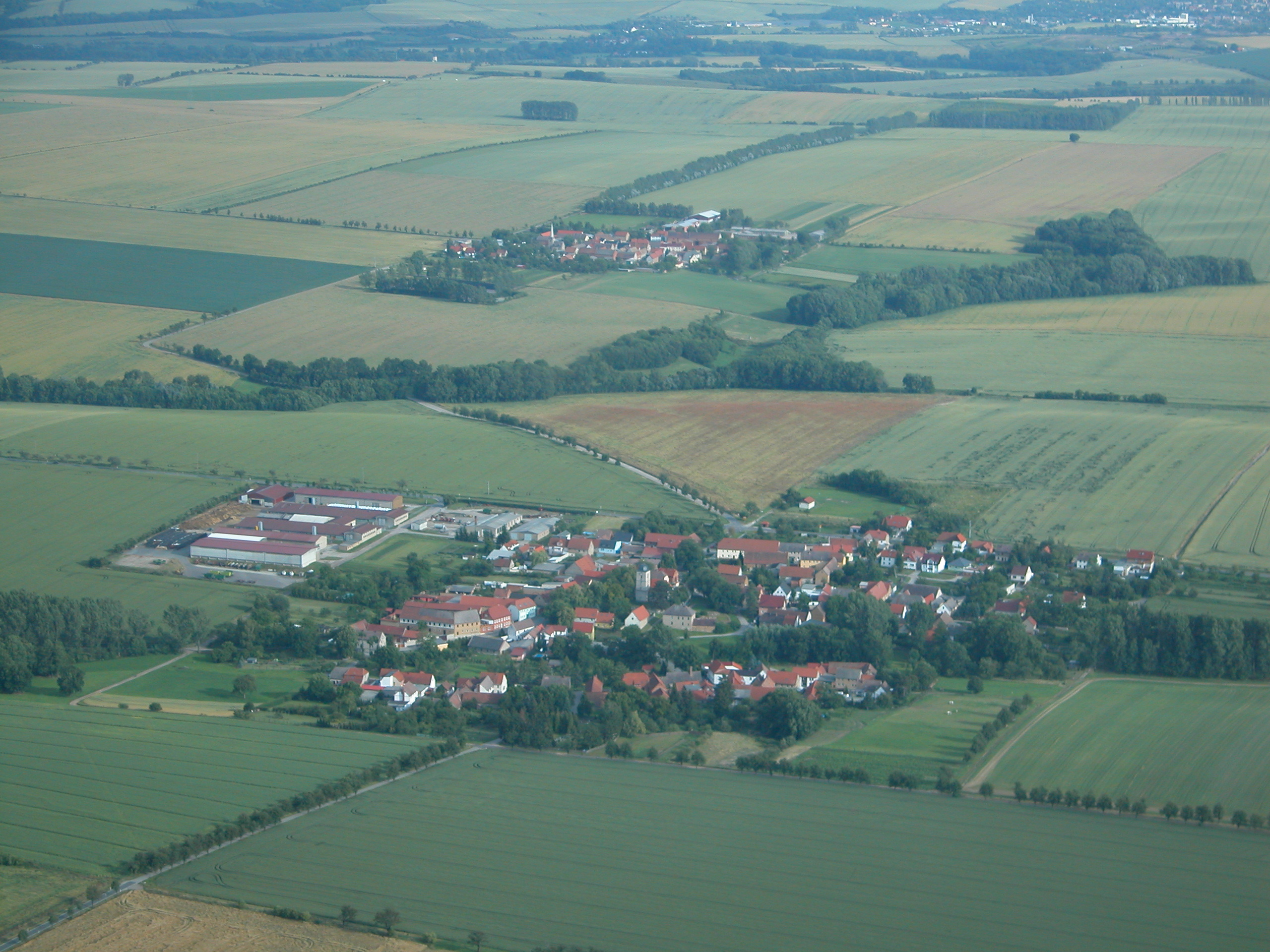
- Interactive map of Gebstedt
- Location within Germany Location within Thuringia
- Coordinates: 51°5′53″N 11°29′47″E
- Country: Germany
- State: Thuringia
- District: Weimarer Land
- Town: Bad Sulza

Area
  - Total: 9.25 km^{2} (3.57 sq mi)
- Elevation: 188 m (617 ft)

Population (2011-12-31)
  - Total: 287
  - Density: 31.0/km^{2} (80.4/sq mi)
- Time zone: UTC+01:00 (CET)
  - Summer (DST): UTC+02:00 (CEST)
- Postal codes: 99510
- Dialling codes: 036463
- Vehicle registration: AP
- Website: www.bad-sulza.de

Gebstedt (German pronunciation: [ˈɡeːpʃtɛt]) is a village and a former municipality in the Weimarer Land district of Thuringia, Germany. Since 31 December 2012, it is part of the town Bad Sulza.
