= List of windmills in Germany =

Germany is divided into sixteen States.

== Baden-Württemberg ==
There are no windmills standing today in Baden-Württemberg, apart from a mock mill in a leisure park at Cleebronn.

== Bavaria ==
Location	Name of mill	Type	Built	Notes	Photograph
Munich	Deutsches Museum			Originally from Zingst, Mecklenburg-Vorpommern. Destroyed in an Allied air raid on Munich in 1944.	
Munich	Deutsches Museum	Sockelgeschoßholländer		Built in Wiesedermeer on the coast of East Friesland - opened at the museum in 1966.	

== Berlin ==
Windmills in Berlin

Location	Name of mill	Type	Built	Notes	Photograph
Britz	Britzer Müehle	Galerieholländer		Muehlen Archiv (in German)	
Buckow	Jungfernmühle	Sockelgeschoßholländer		Muehlen Archiv (in German)	
Gatow	Gatower Mühle	Bockwindmühle	2008		
Kreuzberg		Bockwindmühle		Restored; Muehlen Archiv (in German)	
Kreuzberg		Galerieholländer		Restored; Muehlen Archiv (in German)	
Mariendorf	Adlermühle	Galerieholländer	1889	Muehlen Archiv (in German)	
Marzahn		Bockwindmühle		Muehlen Archiv (in German)	
Zehlendorf		Turmholländer		Muehlen Archiv (in German)	

== Brandenburg ==
See List of windmills in Brandenburg

== Bremen ==
Location	Name of mill	Type	Built	Notes	Photograph
Bremen	Mühle Am Wall	Galerieholländer	1898	Converted to restaurant	
Horn-Lehe	Horner Mühle	Sockelgeschoßholländer			
Hemelingen	Arberger Mühle	Holländerwindmühle	1803		
Mahndorf		Holländerwindmühle		House conversion.	
Oberneuland	Oberneulander Mühle	Galerieholländer	1848		
Rekum	Rekumer Mühle	Wallhollander	1871		
Speckenbüttel	Freilichtmuseum Bremerhaven	Bockwindmühle			

== Hamburg ==
Location	Name of mill	Type	Built	Notes	Photograph
Curslack quarter	Riekmoehl	Bockwindmühle			
Reitbrook quarter	Reitbrooker Mühle	Galerieholländer			
Wilhelmsburg quarter	Johanna	Galerieholländer			

== Hesse ==
Location	Name of mill	Type	Built	Notes	Photograph
Bad Nauheim		Turnholländer		Pumping mill for saltworks.	
Neu-Anspach	Hessenpark Windmüehle	Galerieholländer			
Neu-Anspach	Hessenpark	Bockwindühle			

== Lower Saxony ==
See List of windmills in Lower Saxony

== Mecklenburg-Vorpommern ==
See List of windmills in Mecklenburg-Vorpommern

== North Rhine-Westphalia ==
See List of windmills in North Rhine-Westphalia

== Rhineland-Palatinate ==
There are no windmills standing today in Rhineland-Palatinate.

== Saarland ==
There are no windmills standing today in Saarland.

== Saxony ==
See List of windmills in Saxony

== Saxony-Anhalt ==
See List of windmills in Saxony-Anhalt

== Schleswig-Holstein ==
See List of windmills in Schleswig-Holstein

== Thuringia ==
See List of windmills in Thuringia
