= Reisdorf (disambiguation) =

Reisdorf can refer to:

- Reisdorf (Luxembourgish: Reisduerf) is a commune and small town in eastern Luxembourg.
- Reisdorf, Thuringia, a municipality of Weimarer Land.
