= Utzberg =

- Village of Grammetal
- Interactive map of Utzberg
- Location within Germany Location within Thuringia
- Coordinates: 50°58′36″N 11°11′32″E
- Country: Germany
- State: Thuringia
- District: Weimarer Land
- Municipality: Grammetal

Area
  - Total: 6.79 km^{2} (2.62 sq mi)
- Elevation: 265 m (869 ft)

Population (2006-12-31)
  - Total: 295
  - Density: 43.4/km^{2} (113/sq mi)
- Time zone: UTC+01:00 (CET)
  - Summer (DST): UTC+02:00 (CEST)
- Postal codes: 99428
- Dialling codes: 036203
- Vehicle registration: AP
- Website: www.vg-grammetal.de

Utzberg is a former municipality in the Weimarer Land district of Thuringia, Germany. Since 1 December 2007, it is part of the municipality Nohra. Since December 2019, it is part of the municipality Grammetal.
