= Großheringen =

- Municipality
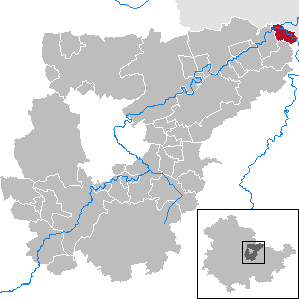
- Location of Großheringen within Weimarer Land district
- Interactive map of Großheringen
- Location within Germany Location within Thuringia
- Coordinates: 51°6′8″N 11°40′0″E
- Country: Germany
- State: Thuringia
- District: Weimarer Land

Government
  - Mayor (2022–28): Michael Thomas

Area
  - Total: 6.03 km^{2} (2.33 sq mi)
- Elevation: 140 m (460 ft)

Population (2025-12-31)
  - Total: 630
  - Density: 100/km^{2} (270/sq mi)
- Time zone: UTC+01:00 (CET)
  - Summer (DST): UTC+02:00 (CEST)
- Postal codes: 99518
- Dialling codes: 036461
- Vehicle registration: AP
- Website: www.bad-sulza.de

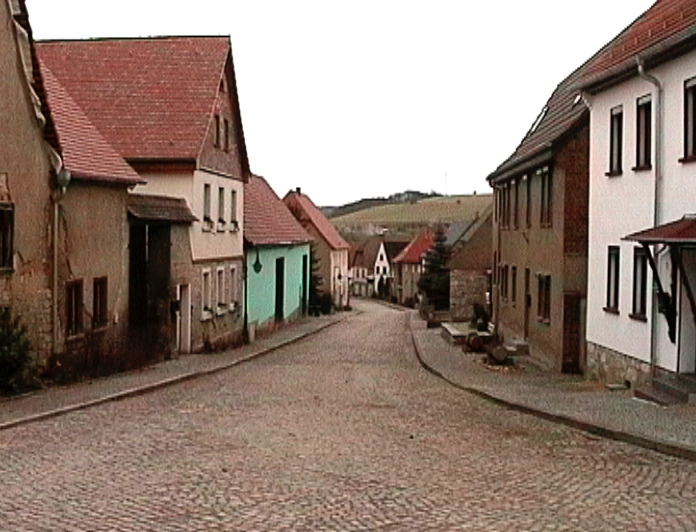

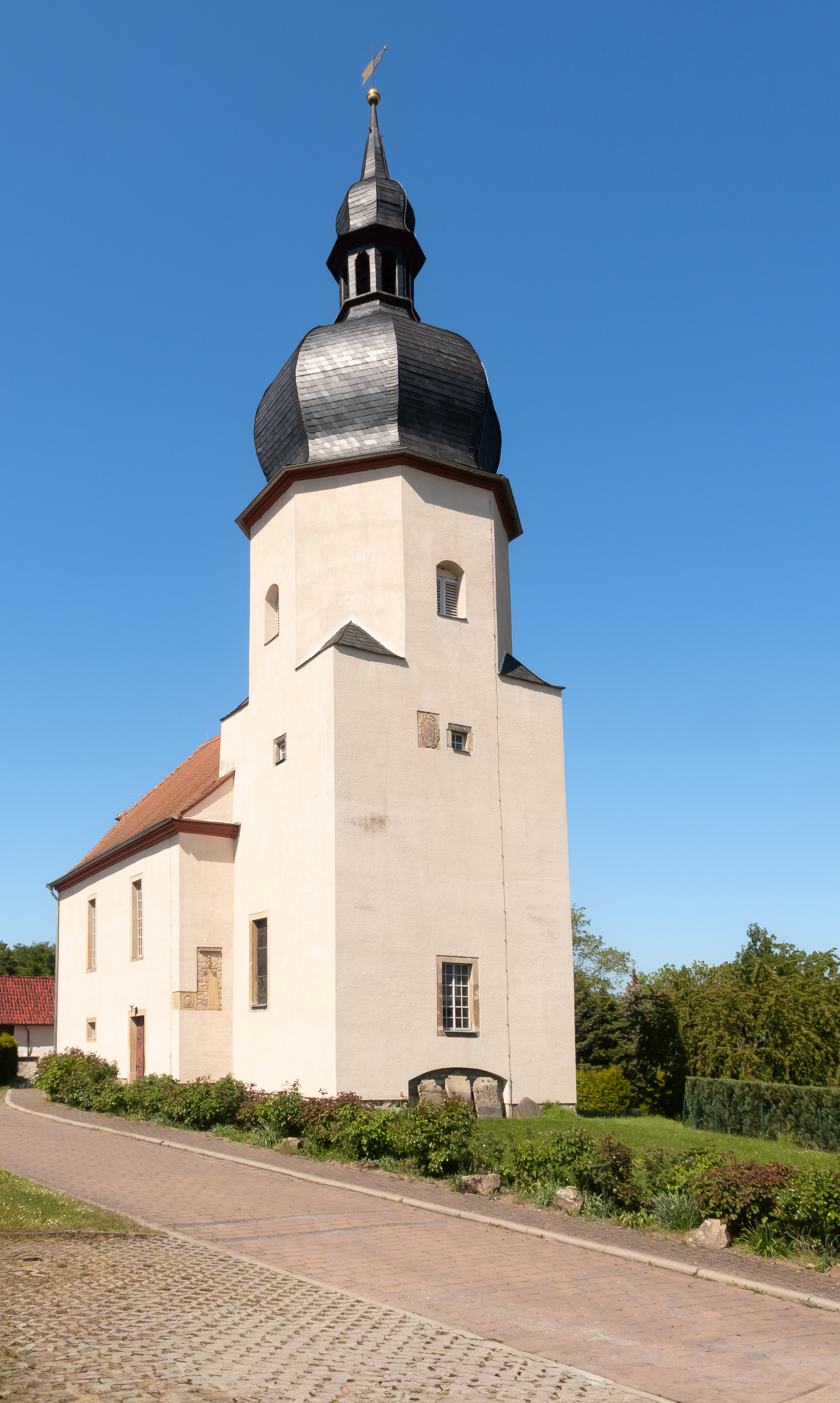

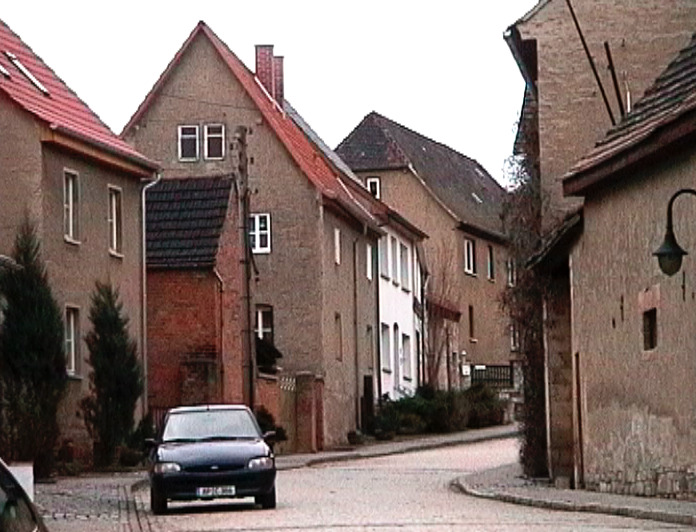

Großheringen is a municipality in the Weimarer Land district of Thuringia, Germany.

== Geography ==
Großheringen is located in the Weimarer Land district in northeastern Thuringia, on the border with Saxony-Anhalt, about 15 km northeast of the district town of Apolda. The Ilm and Saale rivers flow through the municipality, with the confluence of the Ilm and Saale rivers located directly below the town of Großheringen.

In addition to the town that gives the municipality its name, the municipality also includes Unterneusulza, located north of the Ilm and the Thuringian Railway, and Kaatschen-Weichau, known for its wine production, located on the Saale about 2 km above the mouth of the Ilm.

Neighboring communities are Bad Sulza, Schmiedehausen and Dornburg-Camburg in Thuringia as well as Naumburg (Saale) and Lanitz-Hassel-Tal in Saxony-Anhalt.

== Story ==
Großheringen was first mentioned in 874 under the name Heringa. The place belonged to the Schenk von Tautenburg family until their extinction in 1640. Due to this history of ownership, Großheringen was subsequently an exclave of the Electorate of Saxony's Amt of Tautenburg until 1815. With the Congress of Vienna, it became part of the Grand Duchy of Saxe-Weimar-Eisenach and was incorporated into the Amt of Dornburg.

The village of Unterneusulza was founded in connection with the salt mining activity in the Ilm valley (a saltworks was built in 1623).

On July 1, 1950, the previously independent municipality of Unterneusulza was incorporated. Kaatschen-Weichau was incorporated in 1974.

== Culture and sights ==
=== Sightseeing features ===
- House Bridge (also: Salt Bridge) over the Ilm from 1753, extensively renovated in 1991
- Millstone of a woad mill at the Peace Square, also known as “Plan”
- Großheringen Church, a hall church, built in 1723 using older components. The pulpit altar dates from the same period.

=== Regular events ===
- Carnival (Carnival Saturday)
- Village Festival (annually on the 2nd weekend in July)
- Vineyard Festival in Kaatschener Dachsberg (1st weekend in September)

=== Partner community ===
Žinkovy in Plzeňský kraj, Czech Republic

== Economy and infrastructure ==
=== Resident companies ===
In Großheringen, the plumbing equipment manufacturer Viega has been manufacturing piping systems in a large factory since 1992. The resulting trade tax revenues (gross in 2008: €3.7 million, in 2023: €11 million) make Großheringen one of the richest municipalities in Thuringia in terms of per capita tax revenue.

=== Transport connections ===
The state road 1060 runs through the town. The new route of the federal highway 87, currently under construction, will improve road access.

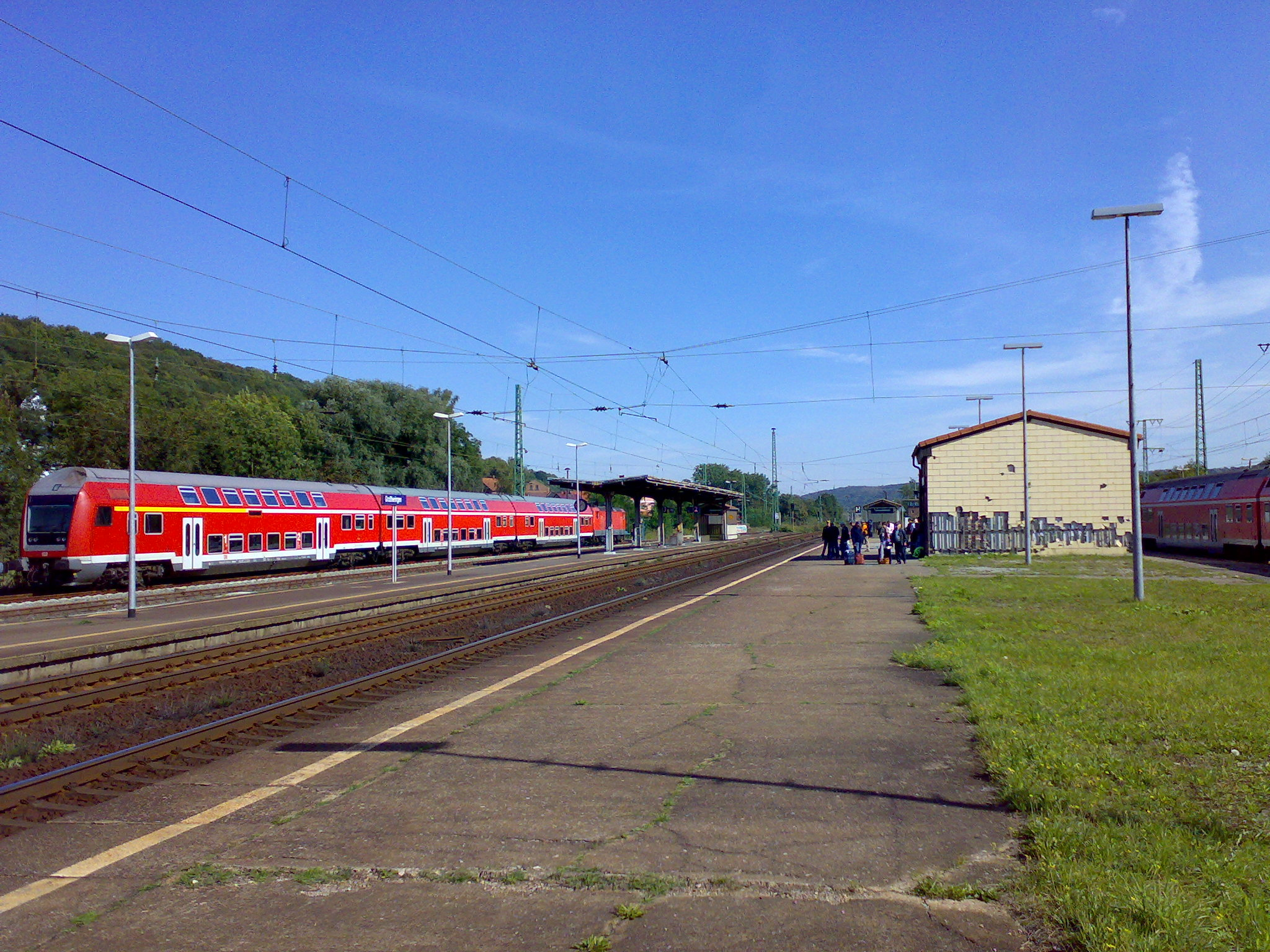

Due to its location at the confluence of two large rivers, Großheringen is ideally situated as a railway junction. The first railway line from Halle / Leipzig to Erfurt (Thuringian Railway) opened through the town in 1847. It runs north in the Saale valley and south in the Ilm valley. Today it is double tracked and electrified. In 1874, another important railway line was added, the Saalbahn; it branches off from the Leipzig–Erfurt railway line in Großheringen and runs south in the Saale valley via Jena to Saalfeld (Saale). Today it is also double tracked and electrified. Another railway line that begins in Großheringen is the Peppermint Railway to Sömmerda, also opened in 1874. It is a single track, non-electrified branch line; passenger traffic on the eastern section was discontinued in December 2017.

From Großheringen, regional trains run towards Apolda – Weimar – Erfurt – Gotha – Eisenach and towards Bad Kösen – Naumburg (Saale) – Weißenfels – Halle (Saale)/Leipzig Central Station.

On December 24, 1935, the worst train accident in Thuringian history occurred in Großheringen, killing 34 people.

=== Tourism ===
Important tourist routes such as the Saale Cycle Route, the Ilmtal Cycle Route, the Saale-Unstrut-Elster Cycle Route and the Saale-Unstrut Wine Route lead through the municipal area.
