= Hopfgarten =

Hopfgarten can refer to:

- Hopfgarten, Thuringia, a municipality of Weimarer Land, Germany
- Hopfgarten im Brixental, in the district of Kitzbühel, Tyrol, Austria
- Hopfgarten in Defereggen, in the district of Lienz, Tyrol, Austria
