= Rannstedt =

- Ortsteil of Bad Sulza
- Interactive map of Rannstedt
- Location within Germany Location within Thuringia
- Coordinates: 51°5′9″N 11°32′24″E
- Country: Germany
- State: Thuringia
- District: Weimarer Land
- Town: Bad Sulza

Area
  - Total: 2.96 km^{2} (1.14 sq mi)
- Elevation: 198 m (650 ft)

Population (2021-12-31)
  - Total: 171
  - Density: 57.8/km^{2} (150/sq mi)
- Time zone: UTC+01:00 (CET)
  - Summer (DST): UTC+02:00 (CEST)
- Postal codes: 99518
- Dialling codes: 036463
- Website: www.bad-sulza.de

Rannstedt (German pronunciation: [ˈʁanʃtɛt]) is a village and a former municipality in the Weimarer Land district of Thuringia, Germany. On 1 January 2023 it became part of the town Bad Sulza.
