= Rittersdorf =

Rittersdorf may refer to the following places in Germany:

- Rittersdorf, Rhineland-Palatinate
- Rittersdorf, Thuringia
