= Ködderitzsch =

- Ortsteil of Bad Sulza
- Interactive map of Ködderitzsch
- Location within Germany Location within Thuringia
- Coordinates: 51°5′9″N 11°30′27″E
- Country: Germany
- State: Thuringia
- District: Weimarer Land
- Town: Bad Sulza

Area
  - Total: 2.82 km^{2} (1.09 sq mi)
- Elevation: 201 m (659 ft)

Population (2017-12-31)
  - Total: 124
  - Density: 44.0/km^{2} (114/sq mi)
- Time zone: UTC+01:00 (CET)
  - Summer (DST): UTC+02:00 (CEST)
- Postal codes: 99518
- Dialling codes: 036463
- Vehicle registration: AP
- Website: www.bad-sulza.de

Ködderitzsch (German pronunciation: [ˈkœdəʁɪtʃ]) is a village and a former municipality in the Weimarer Land district of Thuringia, Germany. Since 1 January 2019, it is part of the town Bad Sulza.
