= Ernst Joachim Förster =

German painter and art critic (1800–1885)

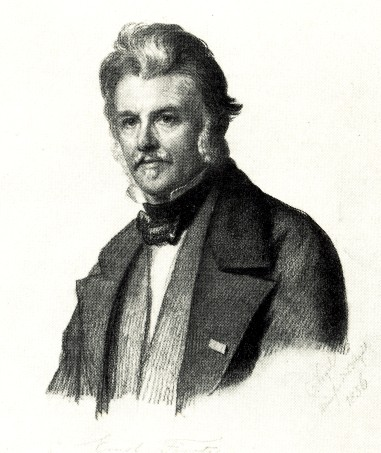
Portrait by Carl Christian Vogel von Vogelstein

Ernst Joachim Förster (8 April 1800 – 29 April 1885) was a German painter and an art critic, author of a number of elaborate and important works bearing on the history of art in Germany and Italy.

== Biography ==
He was born in Saaleplatte, and initially studied theology and philosophy, but soon devoted himself to art, entering the studio of Peter von Cornelius at Munich. He was employed in painting the frescoes in the Aula at the University of Bonn, and those of the Glyptothek and the arcades at Munich, but his reputation rests chiefly on his discovery of several ancient pictures, and on his works on the history of art. His greatest discovery was the frescoes of Altichiero da Zevio, which date as far back as 1376, in the Chapel of San Giorgio at Padua.

It is known that he lived at Löwen Straße 8 in Munich around 1850. His brother was Friedrich Christoph Förster. He was the son-in-law of Jean Paul, whose works he edited, and whose biography he wrote.

== Art works ==
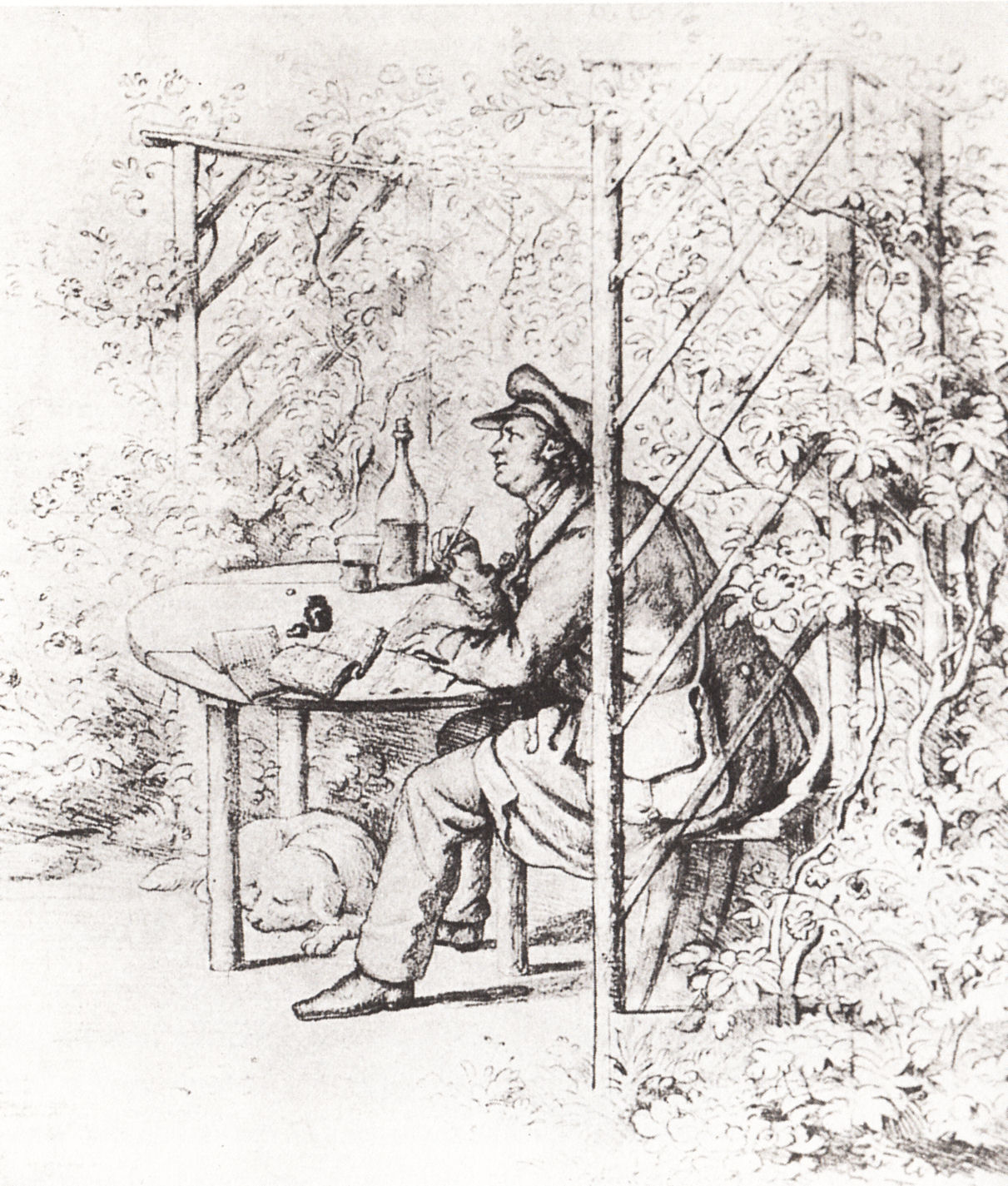
Jean Paul painted by Ernst Förster

Among his paintings are “Hellas Liberated,” and portraits of the Duke and Duchess of Altenburg and children. Among his frescoes are scenes from Johann Wolfgang von Goethe's poems, and scenes from Christoph Martin Wieland's Musarion and Die Grazien, in the Royal Palace at Munich.

== Literary works ==
- Die Wandgemälde der Sanct Georgenkapelle zu Padua (1859)
- Vorschule der Kunstgeschichte (1862)
- Denkmale deutscher Baukunst, Bildnerei und Malerei (1853–69)
- Geschichte der deutschen Kunst (1851–60)
- Geschichte der italienischen Kunst (1869–78)
- Peter von Cornelius (1874)

Among his works are excellent guide books to Munich, Italy, and Germany.

== Family ==
He was the younger brother of historian and poet Friedrich Christoph Förster.

== See also ==
- List of German painters
