= Kleinschwabhausen =

- Ortsteil of Großschwabhausen
- Interactive map of Kleinschwabhausen
- Location within Germany Location within Thuringia
- Coordinates: 50°55′54″N 11°27′42″E
- Country: Germany
- State: Thuringia
- District: Weimarer Land
- Municipality: Großschwabhausen

Area
  - Total: 3.85 km^{2} (1.49 sq mi)
- Elevation: 316 m (1,037 ft)

Population (2024-12-31)
  - Total: 218
  - Density: 56.6/km^{2} (147/sq mi)
- Time zone: UTC+01:00 (CET)
  - Summer (DST): UTC+02:00 (CEST)
- Postal codes: 99441
- Dialling codes: 036454
- Vehicle registration: AP

Kleinschwabhausen is a village and a former municipality in the Weimarer Land district of Thuringia, Germany. Since 1 January 2026, it is part of the municipality Großschwabhausen.
