= Nauendorf =

Nauendorf may refer to:

- Nauendorf, Thuringia, a municipality in Weimarer Land, Thuringia, Germany
- Nauendorf (Wettin-Löbejün), a village in the town Wettin-Löbejün, Saxony-Anhalt, Germany
- Friedrich Joseph, Count of Nauendorf, general in Habsburg service
