= Magdala, Germany =

Magdala
- Town
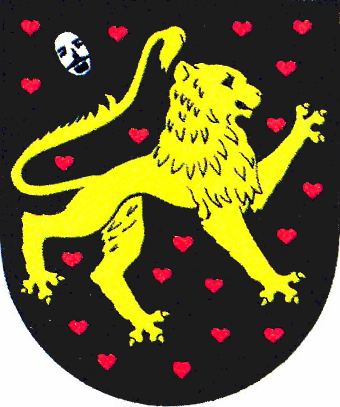
- Coat of arms

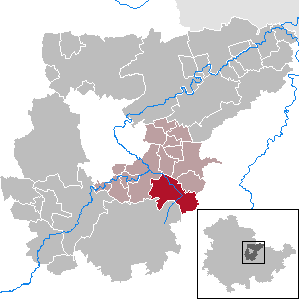
- Location of Magdala within Weimarer Land district
- Interactive map of Magdala
- Location within Germany Location within Thuringia
- Coordinates: 50°54′24″N 11°26′46″E
- Country: Germany
- State: Thuringia
- District: Weimarer Land
- Municipal assoc.: Mellingen

Government
  - Mayor (2022–28): Mario Haßkarl

Area
  - Total: 20.58 km^{2} (7.95 sq mi)
- Elevation: 271 m (889 ft)

Population (2025-12-31)
  - Total: 1,924
  - Density: 93.49/km^{2} (242.1/sq mi)
- Time zone: UTC+01:00 (CET)
  - Summer (DST): UTC+02:00 (CEST)
- Postal codes: 99441
- Dialling codes: 036454
- Vehicle registration: AP
- Website: www.stadt-magdala.de

Magdala (German pronunciation: [ˈmakdala]) is a town in the Weimarer Land district, in Thuringia, Germany. It is situated 10 kilometres (6 miles) west of Jena, and 12 kilometres (7 miles) southeast of Weimar.

== History ==
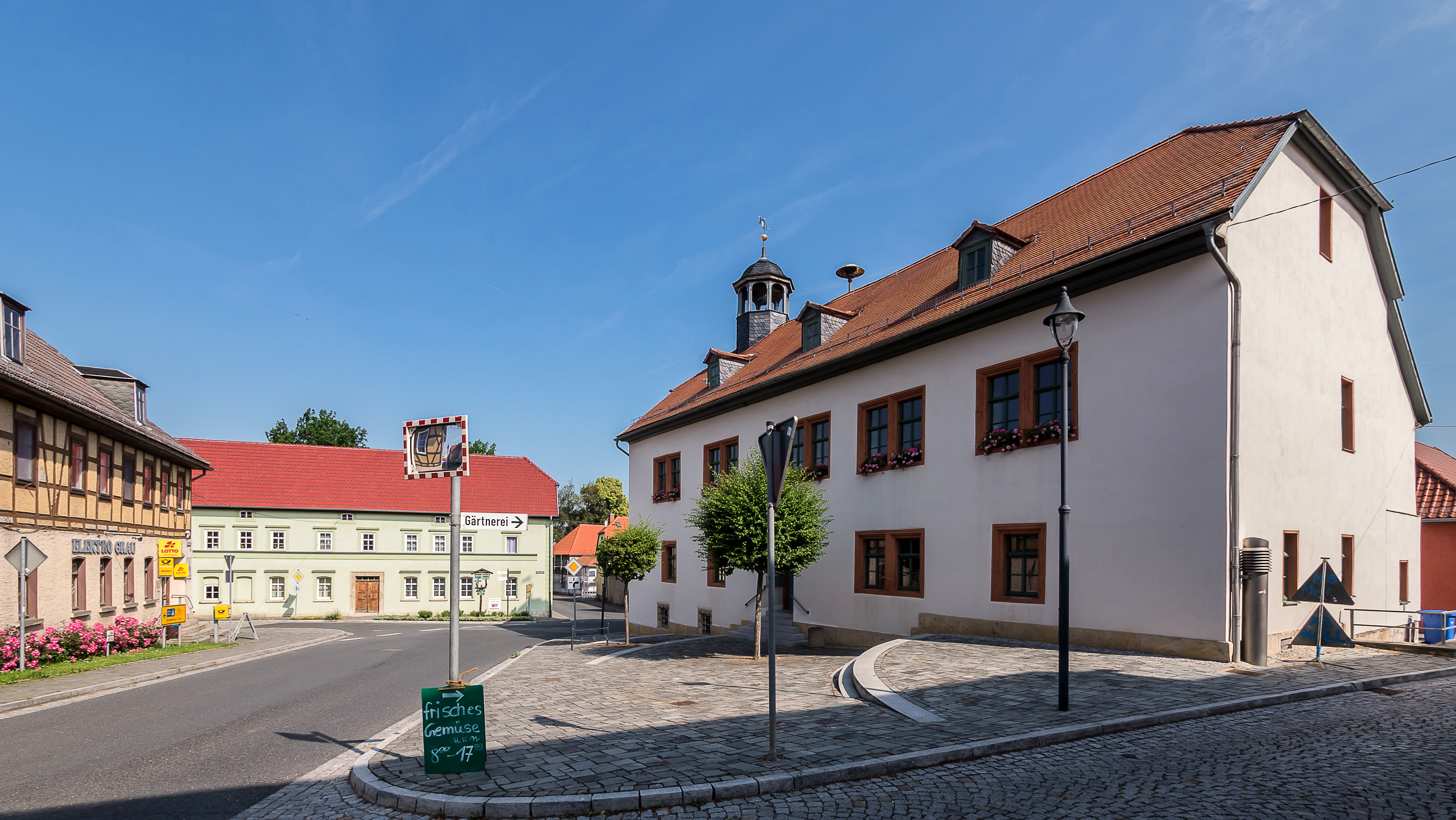
Magdala

Magdala was first mentioned in writing as Madaha in the year 874. The name changed to Madela (1184), Madela (1193), Madala (1203), Madla (1301), Madela (1345 and 1393), before settling on Magdala. The brothers Alexander and Dietrich von Magdala were vassals of the Counts of Orlamünde and resided in Magdala Water Castle. The castle was located at the northeast corner of the old town in the lowlands of the Magdel river. Later, the Wettins exercised feudal authority. The city was partially destroyed in 1450, and the castle was destroyed in 1452 during the Saxon Fraternal War. Today, only remnants of walls and the surrounding moat remain. Around 1284, the town received city rights from the Counts of Orlamünde. After the destruction during the Saxon Fraternal War, the city lost significance. Between 1535 and 1545, the city became Protestant. The town hall, a landmark of the city, dates back to 1571. The year is carved above the former entrance portal in Renaissance style. The ancient foundations from 1570 suggest a building that coincides with the founding of the city in 1288. In 1849, the town hall and parts of the inner city burned down. However, the sturdy town hall walls remained standing and gave the 1850 rebuilt structure its current appearance. A flood in 1613 claimed many lives in Magdala. The domain, comprising 255 hectares, was the property of the Grand Duchy of Saxe-Weimar-Eisenach. In 1923, it was leased to Hubert Scheibe.

== Personalities ==
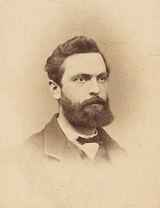
Heinrich Friedrich Weber

- August Wilhelm Dennstedt (1776-1826), natural scientist, doctor and author. In addition, he was mayor in Magdala and, since 1818, scientific director of the botanical garden Belvedere in Weimar.
- Anton Sommer (1816-1888), poet from Rudolstadt, worked temporarily as a house teacher in Magdala
- Heinrich Friedrich Weber (1843-1912), physicist from Magdala, professor at the ETH Zürich
