= Kranichfeld (Verwaltungsgemeinschaft) =

Municipal association in Thuringia, Germany

- Verwaltungsgemeinschaft
- Map of Weimarer Land highlighting Kranichfeld
- Interactive map of Kranichfeld
- Location within Germany Location within Thuringia
- Country: Germany
- State: Thuringia
- District: Weimarer Land
- Seat: Kranichfeld
- Subdivisions: 6 municipalities

Area
  - Total: 68.05 km^{2} (26.27 sq mi)

Population (2025-12-31)
  - Total: 6,207
  - Density: 91.21/km^{2} (236.2/sq mi)
- Time zone: UTC+01:00 (CET)
  - Summer (DST): UTC+02:00 (CEST)
- Website: www.vg-kranichfeld.de

Kranichfeld is a Verwaltungsgemeinschaft in the district Weimarer Land in Thuringia, Germany. The seat of the Verwaltungsgemeinschaft is in Kranichfeld.

The Verwaltungsgemeinschaft Kranichfeld consists of the following municipalities:

1. Hohenfelden
2. Klettbach
3. Kranichfeld
4. Nauendorf
5. Rittersdorf
6. Tonndorf
