= Mechelroda =

- Ortsteil of Mellingen
- Interactive map of Mechelroda
- Location within Germany Location within Thuringia
- Coordinates: 50°54′40″N 11°22′42″E
- Country: Germany
- State: Thuringia
- District: Weimarer Land
- Municipality: Mellingen

Area
  - Total: 4.36 km^{2} (1.68 sq mi)
- Elevation: 345 m (1,132 ft)

Population (2024-12-31)
  - Total: 262
  - Density: 60.1/km^{2} (156/sq mi)
- Time zone: UTC+01:00 (CET)
  - Summer (DST): UTC+02:00 (CEST)
- Postal codes: 99441
- Dialling codes: 036453
- Vehicle registration: AP

Mechelroda is a village and a former municipality in the Weimarer Land district of Thuringia, Germany. Since 1 January 2026, it is part of the municipality Mellingen.
