= Friedrich Christoph Förster =

German historian and poet (1791–1868)

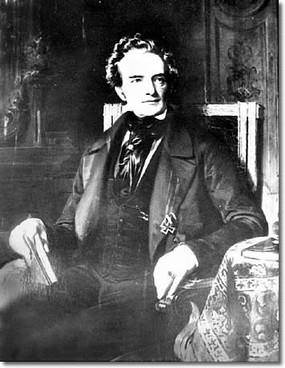
Friedrich Christoph Förster

Friedrich Christoph Förster (24 September 1791 in Münchengosserstädt on the Saale – 8 November 1868 in Berlin) was a German historian and poet.

== Biography ==
He was the second son of Karl Christoph Förster (1751-1811), and consequently an older brother of the painter Ernst Joachim Förster (1800-1885). He received his early education at Altenburg, and after a course of theology at Jena, devoted some time to archaeology and the history of art.

At the outbreak of the War of Liberation against Napoleon in 1813, he joined the Lützow Free Corps with Theodor Körner, quickly attaining the rank of captain. Like Körner, he wrote spirited war songs, which added to the national enthusiasm. On the conclusion of the war, he was appointed professor at the school of engineering and artillery in Berlin, but on account of some democratic writings he was dismissed from this office in 1817. He then became connected with various journals until about 1829, when he received an appointment at the royal museum in Berlin, with the title of court councillor (German: Hofrat). He was the founder and secretary of the Wissenschaftlicher Kunstverein in Berlin.

== Works ==
Förster's principal works are:

- Beiträge zur neueren Kriegsgeschichte ("Contributions to the history of modern wars," Berlin, 1816)
- Grundzüge der Geschichte des preussischen Staates ("Essentials of Prussian history," Berlin, 1818)
- Der Feldmarschall Blücher und seine Umgebungen ("Field marshal Blücher and his surroundings," Leipzig, 1820)
- Friedrich der Grosse, Jugendjahre, Bildung und Geist ("Frederick the Great: Youth, Education and Intellect," Berlin, 1822)
- Albrecht von Wallenstein (Potsdam, 1834)
- Friedrick Wilhelm I, König von Preussen (Potsdam, 1834-1835)
- Die Höfe und Kabinette Europas im 18. Jahrhundert ("The courts and ministries of Europe in the 18th century," Potsdam, 1836-1839)
- Leben und Taten Friedrichs des Grossen ("Life and deeds of Frederick the Great," Meissen, 1840-1841)
- Wallensteins Prozess (Leipzig, 1844)
- Preussens Helden in Krieg und Frieden, neuere und neueste preussische Geschichte ("Prussia's heroes in war and peace, late and modern Prussian history," 7 vols., Berlin, 1849-1860). This is a history of Prussia from 1640-1815. The three concluding volumes of this work contain the history of the war of liberation of 1813-1815. This worked provoked severe criticism.

He brought out an edition of Hegel's works, adapted several of Shakespeare's plays for the theatre, wrote a number of poems and an historical drama, Gustav Adolf (Berlin, 1832).

Many of his lesser writings were collected and published as Kriegslieder, Romanzen, Erzählungen und Legenden ("War songs, romances, stories and legends," Berlin, 1838). The beginning of an autobiography of Förster, edited by H. Kletke, has been published under the title, Kunst und Leben ("Art and Life," Berlin, 1873).
