= Hohlstedt =

- Village of Großschwabhausen
- Interactive map of Hohlstedt
- Location within Germany Location within Thuringia
- Coordinates: 50°57′36″N 11°28′45″E
- Country: Germany
- State: Thuringia
- District: Weimarer Land
- Town: Großschwabhausen

Area
  - Total: 4.13 km^{2} (1.59 sq mi)
- Elevation: 305 m (1,001 ft)

Population (2006-12-31)
  - Total: 238
  - Density: 57.6/km^{2} (149/sq mi)
- Time zone: UTC+01:00 (CET)
  - Summer (DST): UTC+02:00 (CEST)
- Postal codes: 99441
- Dialling codes: 036425

Hohlstedt is a former municipality in the Weimarer Land district of Thuringia, Germany. Since 1 December 2007, it is part of the municipality Großschwabhausen.

== Geography ==
Federal Highway 7 runs between Hohlstedt and Kötschau, connecting Jena and Weimar. The village lies on a gently rising plateau in the agricultural plain around Weimar and Apolda. It is situated amidst gardens and fields.

== History ==
The village was first documented on 2 December 958. It was and remains predominantly agricultural. The listed Eulenstein farmstead is a notable landmark.
