= Reisdorf, Thuringia =

- Ortsteil of Bad Sulza
- Interactive map of Reisdorf, Thuringia
- Location within Germany Location within Thuringia
- Coordinates: 51°6′7″N 11°33′30″E
- Country: Germany
- State: Thuringia
- District: Weimarer Land
- Town: Bad Sulza

Area
  - Total: 5.39 km^{2} (2.08 sq mi)
- Elevation: 152 m (499 ft)

Population (2011-12-31)
  - Total: 311
  - Density: 57.7/km^{2} (149/sq mi)
- Time zone: UTC+01:00 (CET)
  - Summer (DST): UTC+02:00 (CEST)
- Postal codes: 99518
- Dialling codes: 036463
- Vehicle registration: AP
- Website: www.bad-sulza.de

Reisdorf (German pronunciation: [ˈʁaɪsdɔʁf];) is a village and a former municipality in the Weimarer Land district of Thuringia, Germany. Since 31 December 2012, it is part of the town Bad Sulza.
