= Mellingen (Verwaltungsgemeinschaft) =

Municipal association in Thuringia, Germany

- Verwaltungsgemeinschaft
- Map of Weimarer Land highlighting Mellingen
- Interactive map of Mellingen
- Location within Germany Location within Thuringia
- Country: Germany
- State: Thuringia
- District: Weimarer Land
- Seat: Mellingen
- Subdivisions: 14 municipalities

Area
  - Total: 113.84 km^{2} (43.95 sq mi)

Population (2025-12-31)
  - Total: 8,202
  - Density: 72.05/km^{2} (186.6/sq mi)
- Time zone: UTC+01:00 (CET)
  - Summer (DST): UTC+02:00 (CEST)
- Website: www.vgem-mellingen.de

Mellingen is a Verwaltungsgemeinschaft in the district Weimarer Land in Thuringia, Germany. The seat of the Verwaltungsgemeinschaft is in Mellingen.

The Verwaltungsgemeinschaft Mellingen consists of the following municipalities:

1. Buchfart
2. Döbritschen
3. Frankendorf
4. Großschwabhausen
5. Hammerstedt
6. Hetschburg
7. Kapellendorf
8. Lehnstedt
9. Magdala
10. Mellingen
11. Oettern
12. Umpferstedt
13. Vollersroda
14. Wiegendorf
