= Kranichfeld =

- Town
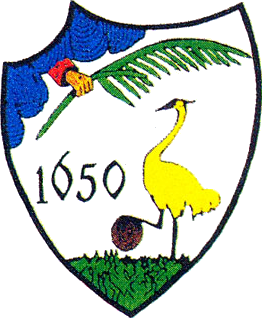
- Coat of arms

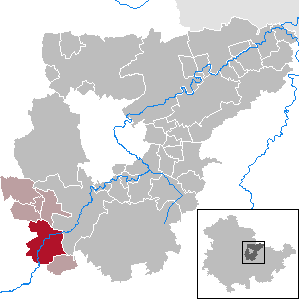
- Location of Kranichfeld within Weimarer Land district
- Interactive map of Kranichfeld
- Location within Germany Location within Thuringia
- Coordinates: 50°51′N 11°12′E
- Country: Germany
- State: Thuringia
- District: Weimarer Land
- Municipal assoc.: Kranichfeld
- Subdivisions: 3

Government
  - Mayor (2022–28): Jörg Bauer

Area
  - Total: 23.1 km^{2} (8.9 sq mi)
- Elevation: 301 m (988 ft)

Population (2025-12-31)
  - Total: 3,376
  - Density: 146/km^{2} (379/sq mi)
- Time zone: UTC+01:00 (CET)
  - Summer (DST): UTC+02:00 (CEST)
- Postal codes: 99446–99448
- Dialling codes: 036450
- Vehicle registration: AP
- Website: www.kranichfeld.de

Kranichfeld (German pronunciation: [ˈkʁaːnɪçˌfɛlt]) is a town in the Weimarer Land district, in Thuringia. It is situated on the river Ilm, 18 km southeast of Erfurt, and 16 km southwest of Weimar.

== History ==
Within the German Empire (1871-1918), Kranichfeld was part of the Grand Duchy of Saxe-Weimar-Eisenach.
