= August Wilhelm Dennstedt =

German physician and botanist (1776–1826)

- Born: 1776
- Died: 1826 (aged 50)
- Known for: "Schlüssel zum Hortus indicus malabaricus"; Genus Dennstaedtia named in his honor
- Title: Bürgermeister of Magdala
- Scientific career
- Fields: Botany, medicine
- Workplaces: Belvedere Grand Ducal Garden; Magdala
- Author abbrev. (botany): Dennst.

August Wilhelm Dennstedt (1776–1826), surname sometimes spelled Dennstaedt, was a German medical doctor and botanist who was bürgermeister of Magdala, a town near Weimar. From 1817 he was scientific director of the Grand Ducal Garden in Belvedere.

He was the taxonomic author of numerous botanical taxa; three examples being the genera Bruxanelia, Coulejia and Merremia. He entered many of his taxonomic findings in the register "Schlüssel zum Hortus indicus malabaricus". The genus Dennstaedtia Bernh. (family Dennstaedtiaceae) is named in his honor.

The standard author abbreviation Dennst. is used to indicate this person as the author when citing a botanical name.

== Published works ==
- Weimar's Flora: Pflanzen mit deutlichen Geschlechtern, Volume 1, 1800.
- Pflanzen mit Luftgefäßen, 1807.
- Nomenclator botanicus: seu, Enumeratio alphabetica omnium hucusque cognitorum vegetabilium, adjectis praecipuis synonymis, 1810.
- Das Gewächsreich: oder characterisirende Beschreibung aller zur Zeit bekannten Gewächse.
- Hortus Belvedereanus. Oder Verzeichniss der bestimmten Pflanzen, 1820.
