= Daasdorf am Berge =

- Ortsteil of Grammetal
- Interactive map of Daasdorf am Berge
- Location within Germany Location within Thuringia
- Coordinates: 51°3′50″N 11°20′33″E
- Country: Germany
- State: Thuringia
- District: Weimarer Land
- Municipality: Grammetal

Area
  - Total: 2.85 km^{2} (1.10 sq mi)
- Elevation: 279 m (915 ft)

Population (2018-12-31)
  - Total: 274
  - Density: 96.1/km^{2} (249/sq mi)
- Time zone: UTC+01:00 (CET)
  - Summer (DST): UTC+02:00 (CEST)
- Postal codes: 99428
- Dialling codes: 03643
- Vehicle registration: AP

Daasdorf am Berge (German pronunciation: [ˈdaːsdɔʁf ʔam ˈbɛʁɡə], lit. 'Daasdorf on the Mountain') is a village and a former municipality in the Weimarer Land district of Thuringia, Germany. Since December 2019, it is part of the municipality Grammetal.
