= Kapellendorf =

- Municipality
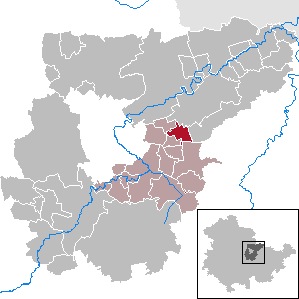
- Location of Kapellendorf within Weimarer Land district
- Interactive map of Kapellendorf
- Location within Germany Location within Thuringia
- Coordinates: 50°58′30″N 11°28′5″E
- Country: Germany
- State: Thuringia
- District: Weimarer Land
- Municipal assoc.: Mellingen

Government
  - Mayor (2022–28): Jürgen Elstermann

Area
  - Total: 5.36 km^{2} (2.07 sq mi)
- Elevation: 245 m (804 ft)

Population (2025-12-31)
  - Total: 415
  - Density: 77.4/km^{2} (201/sq mi)
- Time zone: UTC+01:00 (CET)
  - Summer (DST): UTC+02:00 (CEST)
- Postal codes: 99510
- Dialling codes: 036425
- Vehicle registration: AP

Kapellendorf is a municipality in the Weimarer Land district of Thuringia, Germany.
