= Mellingen, Germany =

Mellingen
- Municipality
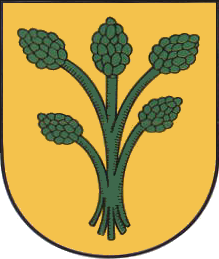
- Coat of arms

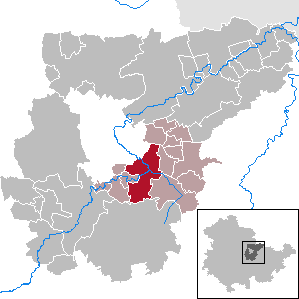
- Location of Mellingen within Weimarer Land district
- Interactive map of Mellingen
- Location within Germany Location within Thuringia
- Coordinates: 50°56′37″N 11°23′36″E
- Country: Germany
- State: Thuringia
- District: Weimarer Land
- Municipal assoc.: Mellingen

Government
  - Mayor (2022–28): Eberhard Hildebrandt

Area
  - Total: 22.78 km^{2} (8.80 sq mi)
- Elevation: 230 m (750 ft)

Population (2025-12-31)
  - Total: 1,949
  - Density: 85.56/km^{2} (221.6/sq mi)
- Time zone: UTC+01:00 (CET)
  - Summer (DST): UTC+02:00 (CEST)
- Postal codes: 99441
- Dialling codes: 036453
- Vehicle registration: AP
- Website: www.mellingen-online.de

Mellingen (German pronunciation: [ˈmɛlɪŋən]) is a municipality in the Weimarer Land district of Thuringia, Germany. The former municipalities Kiliansroda and Mechelroda were absorbed in January 2026.
