= Großschwabhausen =

- Municipality
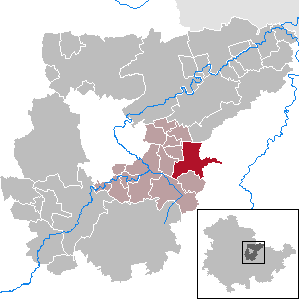
- Location of Großschwabhausen within Weimarer Land district
- Interactive map of Großschwabhausen
- Location within Germany Location within Thuringia
- Coordinates: 50°56′16″N 11°29′12″E
- Country: Germany
- State: Thuringia
- District: Weimarer Land
- Municipal assoc.: Mellingen

Government
  - Mayor (2020–26): Steffen Voigt

Area
  - Total: 16.04 km^{2} (6.19 sq mi)
- Elevation: 319 m (1,047 ft)

Population (2025-12-31)
  - Total: 1,286
  - Density: 80.17/km^{2} (207.7/sq mi)
- Time zone: UTC+01:00 (CET)
  - Summer (DST): UTC+02:00 (CEST)
- Postal codes: 99441
- Dialling codes: 036454
- Vehicle registration: AP
- Website: grossschwabhausen.de

Großschwabhausen is a municipality in the Weimarer Land district of Thuringia, Germany. On 1 December 2007, the former municipality Hohlstedt was incorporated by Großschwabhausen. The former municipality Kleinschwabhausen was absorbed in January 2026.
