= Frankendorf =

- Municipality
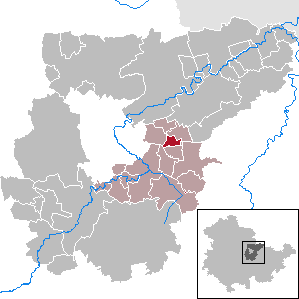
- Location of Frankendorf within Weimarer Land district
- Interactive map of Frankendorf
- Location within Germany Location within Thuringia
- Coordinates: 50°58′6″N 11°26′58″E
- Country: Germany
- State: Thuringia
- District: Weimarer Land
- Municipal assoc.: Mellingen

Government
  - Mayor (2022–28): Karl Krähmer

Area
  - Total: 2.68 km^{2} (1.03 sq mi)
- Elevation: 270 m (890 ft)

Population (2025-12-31)
  - Total: 150
  - Density: 56/km^{2} (140/sq mi)
- Time zone: UTC+01:00 (CET)
  - Summer (DST): UTC+02:00 (CEST)
- Postal codes: 99441
- Dialling codes: 036453
- Vehicle registration: AP

Frankendorf is a municipality in the Weimarer Land district of Thuringia, Germany.
