= Vollersroda =

- Municipality
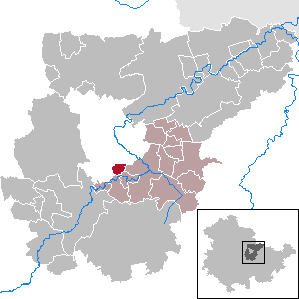
- Location of Vollersroda within Weimarer Land district
- Interactive map of Vollersroda
- Location within Germany Location within Thuringia
- Coordinates: 50°56′14″N 11°19′53″E
- Country: Germany
- State: Thuringia
- District: Weimarer Land
- Municipal assoc.: Mellingen

Government
  - Mayor (2022–28): Gabriele Klaiber

Area
  - Total: 2.58 km^{2} (1.00 sq mi)
- Elevation: 342 m (1,122 ft)

Population (2025-12-31)
  - Total: 206
  - Density: 79.8/km^{2} (207/sq mi)
- Time zone: UTC+01:00 (CET)
  - Summer (DST): UTC+02:00 (CEST)
- Postal codes: 99438
- Dialling codes: 03643
- Vehicle registration: AP
- Website: www.vollersroda.de

Vollersroda is a municipality in the Weimarer Land district of Thuringia, Germany.
