= Lehnstedt =

- Municipality
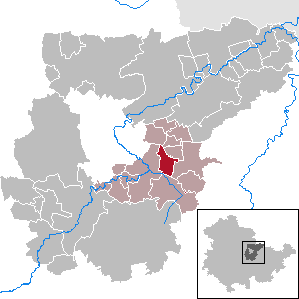
- Location of Lehnstedt within Weimarer Land district
- Interactive map of Lehnstedt
- Location within Germany Location within Thuringia
- Coordinates: 50°56′24″N 11°26′15″E
- Country: Germany
- State: Thuringia
- District: Weimarer Land
- Municipal assoc.: Mellingen

Government
  - Mayor (2023–29): Tobias Delle

Area
  - Total: 6.45 km^{2} (2.49 sq mi)
- Elevation: 280 m (920 ft)

Population (2025-12-31)
  - Total: 338
  - Density: 52.4/km^{2} (136/sq mi)
- Time zone: UTC+01:00 (CET)
  - Summer (DST): UTC+02:00 (CEST)
- Postal codes: 99441
- Dialling codes: 036453
- Vehicle registration: AP

Lehnstedt is a municipality in the Weimarer Land district of Thuringia, Germany.
