= Isseroda =

Village in Germany

- Ortsteil of Grammetal
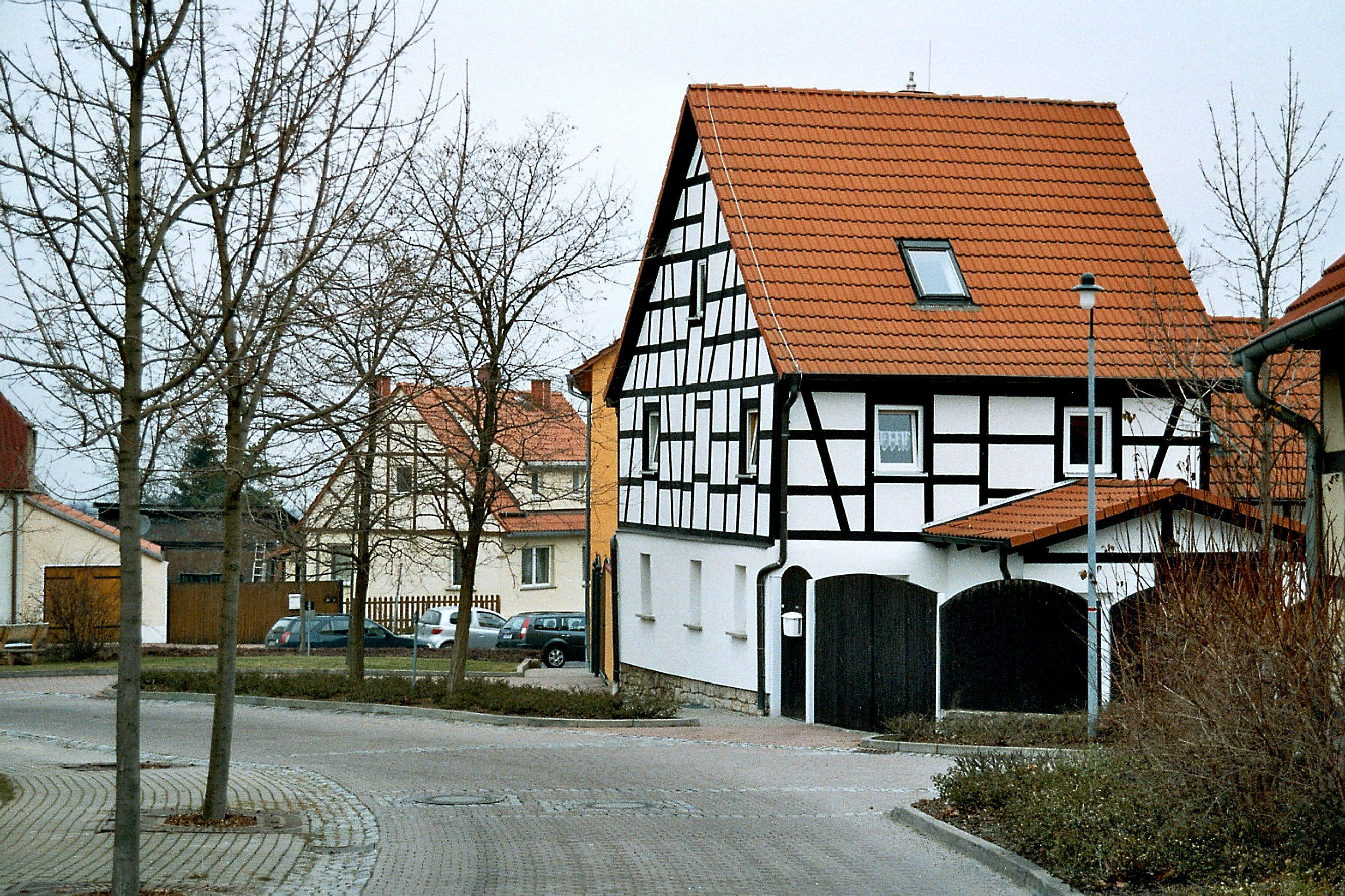
- Interactive map of Isseroda
- Location within Germany Location within Thuringia
- Coordinates: 50°57′20″N 11°13′15″E
- Country: Germany
- State: Thuringia
- District: Weimarer Land
- Municipality: Grammetal

Area
  - Total: 3.91 km^{2} (1.51 sq mi)
- Elevation: 352 m (1,155 ft)

Population (2018-12-31)
  - Total: 561
  - Density: 143/km^{2} (372/sq mi)
- Time zone: UTC+01:00 (CET)
  - Summer (DST): UTC+02:00 (CEST)
- Postal codes: 99428
- Dialling codes: 03643
- Vehicle registration: AP

Isseroda (German pronunciation: [ɪsəˈʁoːda]) is a village and a former municipality in the Weimarer Land district of Thuringia, Germany. Since December 2019, it is part of the municipality Grammetal.
