= Troistedt =

- Ortsteil of Grammetal
- Coat of arms
- Interactive map of Troistedt
- Location within Germany Location within Thuringia
- Coordinates: 50°56′20″N 11°14′42″E
- Country: Germany
- State: Thuringia
- District: Weimarer Land
- Municipality: Grammetal

Area
  - Total: 9.27 km^{2} (3.58 sq mi)
- Elevation: 354 m (1,161 ft)

Population (2018-12-31)
  - Total: 188
  - Density: 20.3/km^{2} (52.5/sq mi)
- Time zone: UTC+01:00 (CET)
  - Summer (DST): UTC+02:00 (CEST)
- Postal codes: 99438
- Dialling codes: 03643
- Vehicle registration: AP

Troistedt (German pronunciation: [ˈtʁoːʃtɛt]) is a village and a former municipality in the Weimarer Land district of Thuringia, Germany. Since December 2019, it is part of the municipality Grammetal.
