= Hammerstedt =

- Municipality
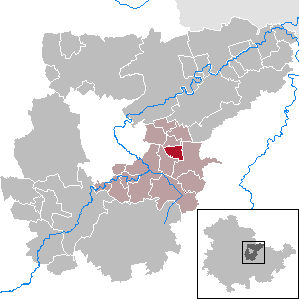
- Location of Hammerstedt within Weimarer Land district
- Interactive map of Hammerstedt
- Location within Germany Location within Thuringia
- Coordinates: 50°57′N 11°27′E
- Country: Germany
- State: Thuringia
- District: Weimarer Land
- Municipal assoc.: Mellingen

Government
  - Mayor (2024–30): Holger Hartwig

Area
  - Total: 3.94 km^{2} (1.52 sq mi)
- Elevation: 278 m (912 ft)

Population (2025-12-31)
  - Total: 184
  - Density: 46.7/km^{2} (121/sq mi)
- Time zone: UTC+01:00 (CET)
  - Summer (DST): UTC+02:00 (CEST)
- Postal codes: 99441
- Dialling codes: 036453
- Vehicle registration: AP

Hammerstedt is a municipality in the Weimarer Land district of Thuringia, Germany.
