= Tonndorf =

- Municipality
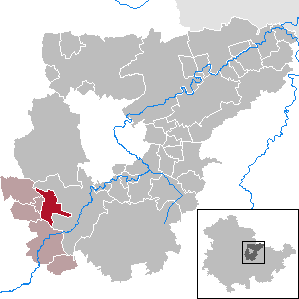
- Location of Tonndorf within Weimarer Land district
- Interactive map of Tonndorf
- Location within Germany Location within Thuringia
- Coordinates: 50°53′21″N 11°12′14″E
- Country: Germany
- State: Thuringia
- District: Weimarer Land
- Municipal assoc.: Kranichfeld

Government
  - Mayor (2020–26): Tony Röser

Area
  - Total: 10.12 km^{2} (3.91 sq mi)
- Elevation: 318 m (1,043 ft)

Population (2025-12-31)
  - Total: 641
  - Density: 63.3/km^{2} (164/sq mi)
- Time zone: UTC+01:00 (CET)
  - Summer (DST): UTC+02:00 (CEST)
- Postal codes: 99438
- Dialling codes: 036450
- Vehicle registration: AP
- Website: www.gemeinde-tonndorf.de

Tonndorf ((German pronunciation: [ˈtɔndɔʁf])) is a municipality in the Weimarer Land district of Thuringia, Germany. The nearest train station is the village München (part of Bad Berka) at the railway from Kranichfeld to Weimar, about four kilometers east of Tonndorf.
