= Döbritschen =

- Municipality
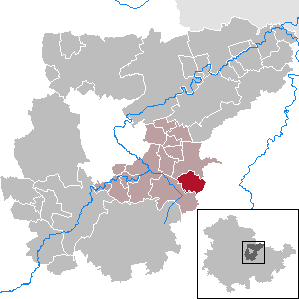
- Location of Döbritschen within Weimarer Land district
- Interactive map of Döbritschen
- Location within Germany Location within Thuringia
- Coordinates: 50°55′9″N 11°28′36″E
- Country: Germany
- State: Thuringia
- District: Weimarer Land
- Municipal assoc.: Mellingen

Government
  - Mayor (2022–28): Susann Hörl

Area
  - Total: 8.33 km^{2} (3.22 sq mi)
- Elevation: 355 m (1,165 ft)

Population (2025-12-31)
  - Total: 225
  - Density: 27.0/km^{2} (70.0/sq mi)
- Time zone: UTC+01:00 (CET)
  - Summer (DST): UTC+02:00 (CEST)
- Postal codes: 99441
- Dialling codes: 036454
- Vehicle registration: AP

Döbritschen is a municipality in the Weimarer Land district of Thuringia, Germany.
