= Hohenfelden =

- Municipality
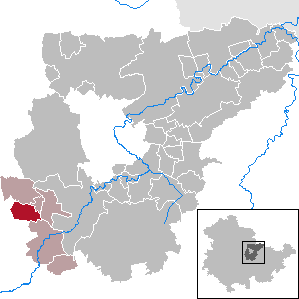
- Location of Hohenfelden within Weimarer Land district
- Interactive map of Hohenfelden
- Location within Germany Location within Thuringia
- Coordinates: 50°52′43″N 11°9′39″E
- Country: Germany
- State: Thuringia
- District: Weimarer Land
- Municipal assoc.: Kranichfeld

Government
  - Mayor (2020–26): Thomas Morche

Area
  - Total: 8.43 km^{2} (3.25 sq mi)
- Elevation: 328 m (1,076 ft)

Population (2025-12-31)
  - Total: 374
  - Density: 44.4/km^{2} (115/sq mi)
- Time zone: UTC+01:00 (CET)
  - Summer (DST): UTC+02:00 (CEST)
- Postal codes: 99448
- Dialling codes: 036450
- Vehicle registration: AP
- Website: hohenfelden.de

Hohenfelden is a municipality in the Weimarer Land district of Thuringia, Germany.

== History ==
Within the German Empire (1871–1918), the northern part of Hohenfelden belonged to the Grand Duchy of Saxe-Weimar-Eisenach, while the southern part belonged to the Duchy of Saxe-Meiningen.
