= Mönchenholzhausen =

Village in Thuringia, Germany

- Ortsteil of Grammetal
- Interactive map of Mönchenholzhausen
- Location within Germany Location within Thuringia
- Coordinates: 50°58′8″N 11°9′16″E
- Country: Germany
- State: Thuringia
- District: Weimarer Land
- Municipality: Grammetal

Area
  - Total: 19.42 km^{2} (7.50 sq mi)
- Elevation: 260 m (850 ft)

Population (2018-12-31)
  - Total: 1,631
  - Density: 83.99/km^{2} (217.5/sq mi)
- Time zone: UTC+01:00 (CET)
  - Summer (DST): UTC+02:00 (CEST)
- Postal codes: 99198
- Dialling codes: 036203 and 036209 Hayn
- Vehicle registration: AP

Mönchenholzhausen (German pronunciation: [ˈmœnçn̩hɔltsˌhaʊzn̩]) is a village and a former municipality in the Weimarer Land district of Thuringia, Germany. Since December 2019, it is part of the municipality Grammetal.
