= Nohra =

- Ortsteil of Grammetal
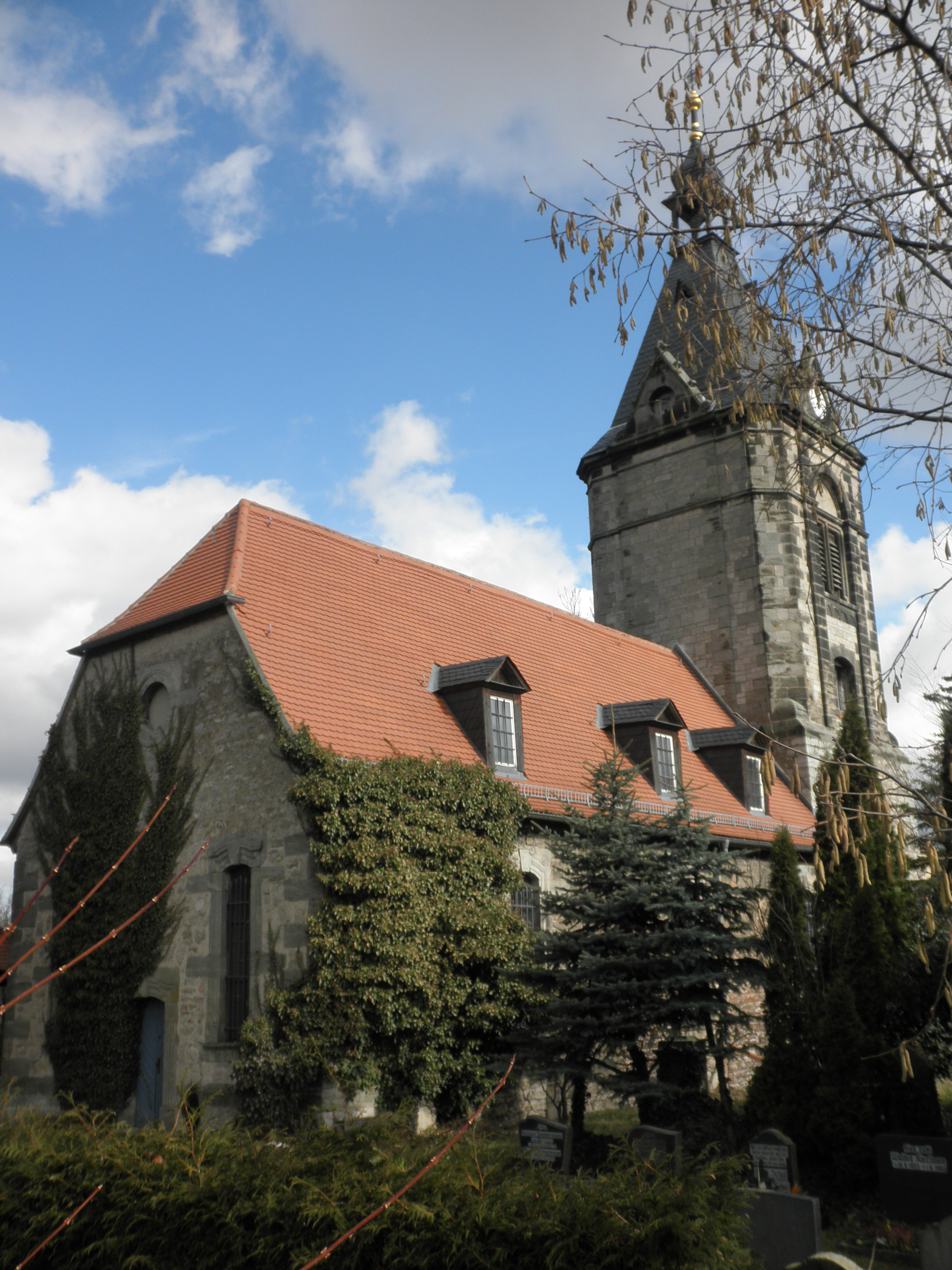

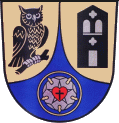
- Coat of arms
- Interactive map of Nohra
- Location within Germany Location within Thuringia
- Coordinates: 50°57′55″N 11°14′2″E
- Country: Germany
- State: Thuringia
- District: Weimarer Land
- Municipality: Grammetal

Area
  - Total: 19.64 km^{2} (7.58 sq mi)
- Elevation: 315 m (1,033 ft)

Population (2018-12-31)
  - Total: 1,653
  - Density: 84.16/km^{2} (218.0/sq mi)
- Time zone: UTC+01:00 (CET)
  - Summer (DST): UTC+02:00 (CEST)
- Postal codes: 99428
- Dialling codes: 03643
- Vehicle registration: AP

Nohra (German pronunciation: [ˈnoːʁa]) is a village and a former municipality in the Weimarer Land district of Thuringia, Germany. On 1 December 2007, the municipality of Utzberg was incorporated into Nohra. Nohra later became part of Grammetal municipality in December 2019.

Nohra was the location of the first Nazi concentration camp, established on 3 March 1933. Prisoners were incarcerated in a school building.

The former Luftwaffe airbase at Nohra was used by the Soviet Army for helicopter operations from 1945 until their withdrawal in 1992. The airfield had a short runway, a hangar and a radio beacon. Subsequently, the department for regional development largely demolished the complex, but a few elements were preserved because of their historic value, including a large stone statue of Lenin which was restored.
