= Hetschburg =

- Municipality
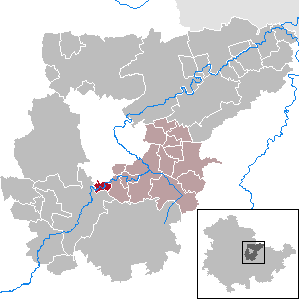
- Location of Hetschburg within Weimarer Land district
- Interactive map of Hetschburg
- Location within Germany Location within Thuringia
- Coordinates: 50°54′42″N 11°17′22″E
- Country: Germany
- State: Thuringia
- District: Weimarer Land
- Municipal assoc.: Mellingen

Government
  - Mayor (2022–28): Alexander Loß

Area
  - Total: 2.72 km^{2} (1.05 sq mi)
- Elevation: 260 m (850 ft)

Population (2025-12-31)
  - Total: 227
  - Density: 83.5/km^{2} (216/sq mi)
- Time zone: UTC+01:00 (CET)
  - Summer (DST): UTC+02:00 (CEST)
- Postal codes: 99438
- Dialling codes: 036458
- Vehicle registration: AP

Hetschburg (German pronunciation: [ˈhɛtʃbʊʁk]) is a municipality in the Weimarer Land district of Thuringia, Germany.
