= Umpferstedt =

- Municipality
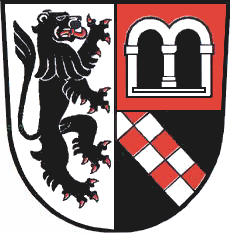
- Coat of arms

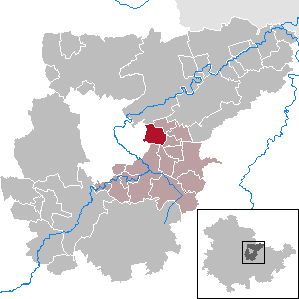
- Location of Umpferstedt within Weimarer Land district
- Interactive map of Umpferstedt
- Location within Germany Location within Thuringia
- Coordinates: 50°58′37″N 11°24′46″E
- Country: Germany
- State: Thuringia
- District: Weimarer Land
- Municipal assoc.: Mellingen

Government
  - Mayor (2022–28): Thomas Stabrey

Area
  - Total: 7.39 km^{2} (2.85 sq mi)
- Elevation: 270 m (890 ft)

Population (2025-12-31)
  - Total: 669
  - Density: 90.5/km^{2} (234/sq mi)
- Time zone: UTC+01:00 (CET)
  - Summer (DST): UTC+02:00 (CEST)
- Postal codes: 99441
- Dialling codes: 03643
- Vehicle registration: AP
- Website: www.umpferstedt.de

Umpferstedt is a municipality in the Weimarer Land district of Thuringia, Germany.
