= Buchfart =

- Municipality
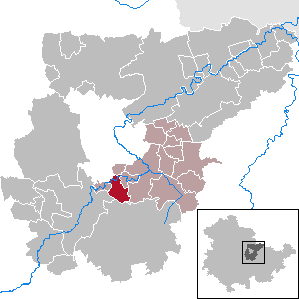
- Location of Buchfart within Weimarer Land district
- Interactive map of Buchfart
- Location within Germany Location within Thuringia
- Coordinates: 50°55′16″N 11°19′57″E
- Country: Germany
- State: Thuringia
- District: Weimarer Land
- Municipal assoc.: Mellingen

Government
  - Mayor (2019–25): Alexander Romanus

Area
  - Total: 7.20 km^{2} (2.78 sq mi)
- Elevation: 258 m (846 ft)

Population (2025-12-31)
  - Total: 202
  - Density: 28.1/km^{2} (72.7/sq mi)
- Time zone: UTC+01:00 (CET)
  - Summer (DST): UTC+02:00 (CEST)
- Postal codes: 99438
- Dialling codes: 03643
- Vehicle registration: AP

Buchfart is a municipality in the Weimarer Land district of Thuringia, Germany.
