= Oettern =

- Municipality
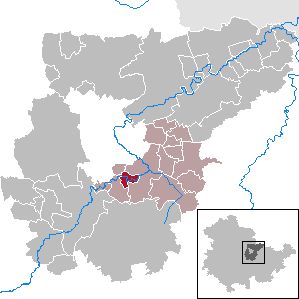
- Location of Oettern within Weimarer Land district
- Interactive map of Oettern
- Location within Germany Location within Thuringia
- Coordinates: 50°55′22″N 11°21′29″E
- Country: Germany
- State: Thuringia
- District: Weimarer Land
- Municipal assoc.: Mellingen

Government
  - Mayor (2022–28): Gerhard Ulrich

Area
  - Total: 3.61 km^{2} (1.39 sq mi)
- Elevation: 245 m (804 ft)

Population (2025-12-31)
  - Total: 114
  - Density: 31.6/km^{2} (81.8/sq mi)
- Time zone: UTC+01:00 (CET)
  - Summer (DST): UTC+02:00 (CEST)
- Postal codes: 99438
- Dialling codes: 036453
- Vehicle registration: AP

Oettern is a municipality in the Weimarer Land district of Thuringia, Germany.
