= Wiegendorf =

- Municipality
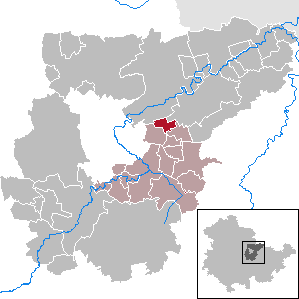
- Location of Wiegendorf within Weimarer Land district
- Interactive map of Wiegendorf
- Location within Germany Location within Thuringia
- Coordinates: 50°59′11″N 11°26′16″E
- Country: Germany
- State: Thuringia
- District: Weimarer Land
- Municipal assoc.: Mellingen

Government
  - Mayor (2022–28): Sven Hofmann

Area
  - Total: 4.04 km^{2} (1.56 sq mi)
- Elevation: 260 m (850 ft)

Population (2025-12-31)
  - Total: 313
  - Density: 77.5/km^{2} (201/sq mi)
- Time zone: UTC+01:00 (CET)
  - Summer (DST): UTC+02:00 (CEST)
- Postal codes: 99510
- Dialling codes: 036462
- Vehicle registration: AP

Wiegendorf is a municipality in the Weimarer Land district of Thuringia, Germany.
