= Grammetal =

- Municipality
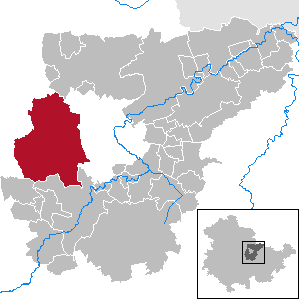
- Location of Grammetal within Weimarer Land district
- Interactive map of Grammetal
- Location within Germany Location within Thuringia
- Coordinates: 50°58′N 11°13′E
- Country: Germany
- State: Thuringia
- District: Weimarer Land

Government
  - Mayor (2020–26): Roland Bodechtel (CDU)

Area
  - Total: 88.28 km^{2} (34.09 sq mi)
- Elevation: 350 m (1,150 ft)

Population (2025-12-31)
  - Total: 6,437
  - Density: 72.92/km^{2} (188.9/sq mi)
- Time zone: UTC+01:00 (CET)
  - Summer (DST): UTC+02:00 (CEST)
- Postal codes: 99198, 99428, 99438
- Dialling codes: 036203, 036209, 03643
- Vehicle registration: AP

Grammetal (German pronunciation: [ˈɡʁaməˌtaːl], lit. 'Gramme Valley') is a municipality in the Weimarer Land district, in Thuringia, Germany. It was created with effect from 31 December 2019 by the merger of the former municipalities of Bechstedtstraß, Daasdorf am Berge, Hopfgarten, Isseroda, Mönchenholzhausen, Niederzimmern, Nohra, Ottstedt am Berge and Troistedt, that had previously coöperated in the Verwaltungsgemeinschaft Grammetal. It takes its name from the river Gramme, that flows through the municipality.
