= Anton Sommer =

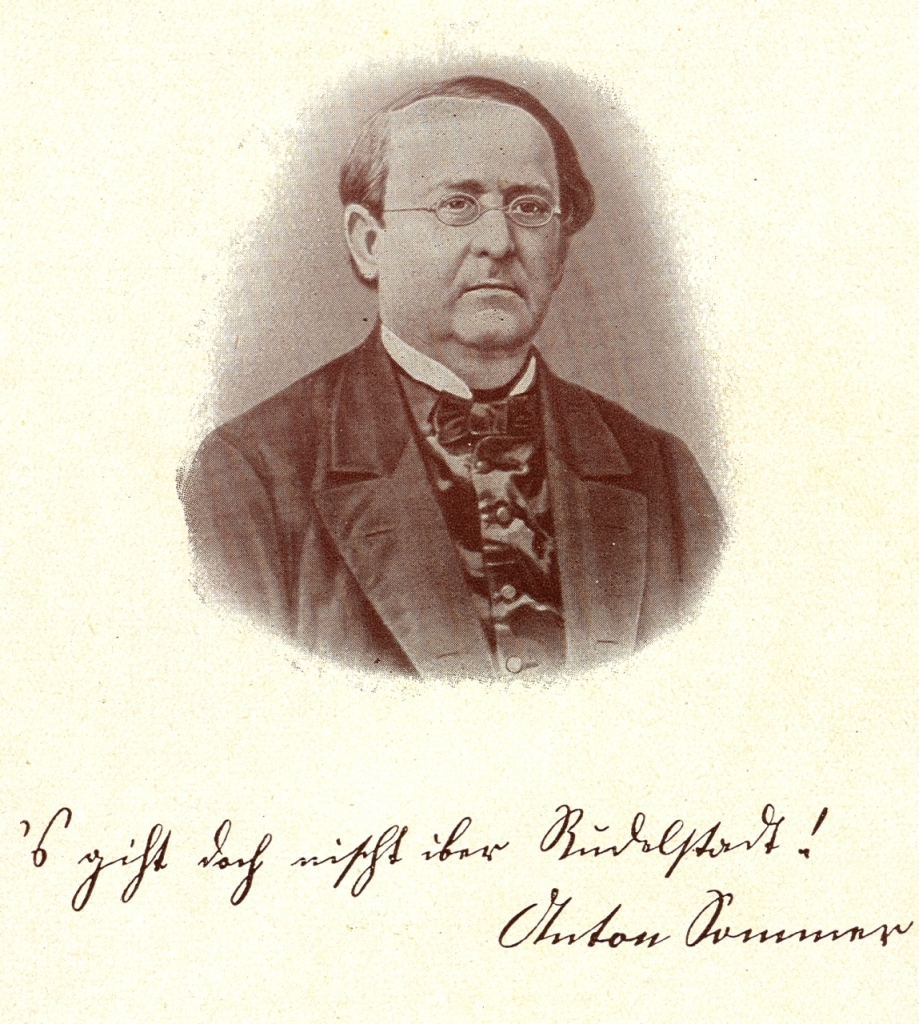
Anton Sommer in 1876

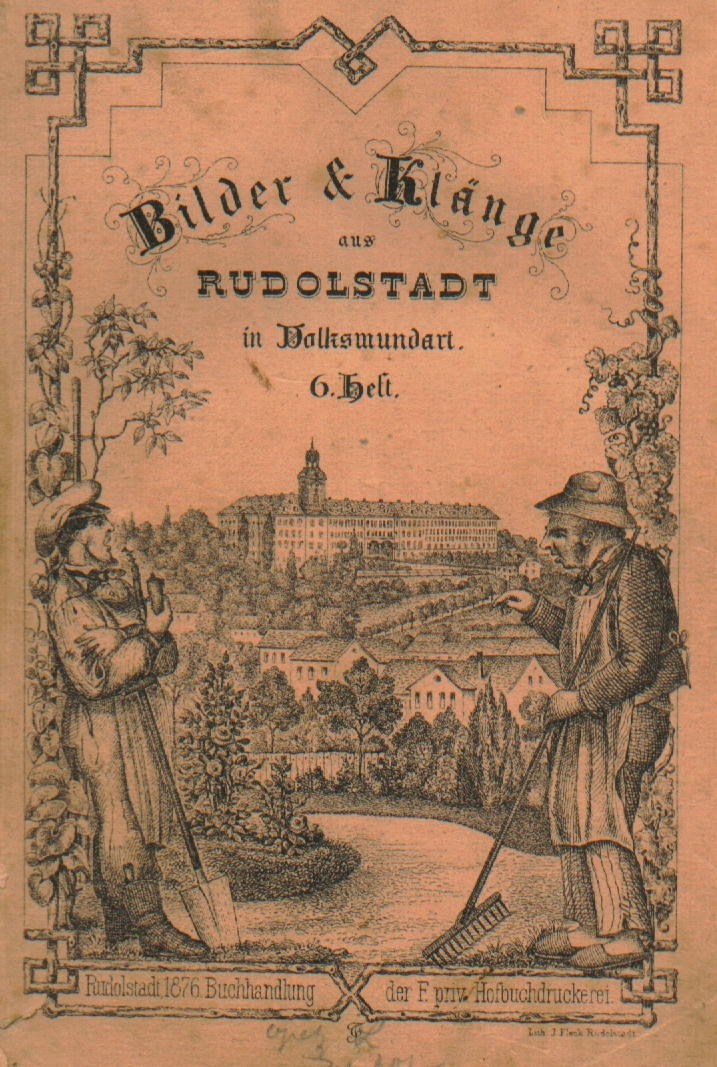
Bilder und Klänge aus Rudolstadt in Volksmundart

Anton Sommer (11 December 1816 – 1 June 1888) was a German dialect poet from Thuringia (now in central Germany). He was born and died in Rudolstadt.

== Life ==
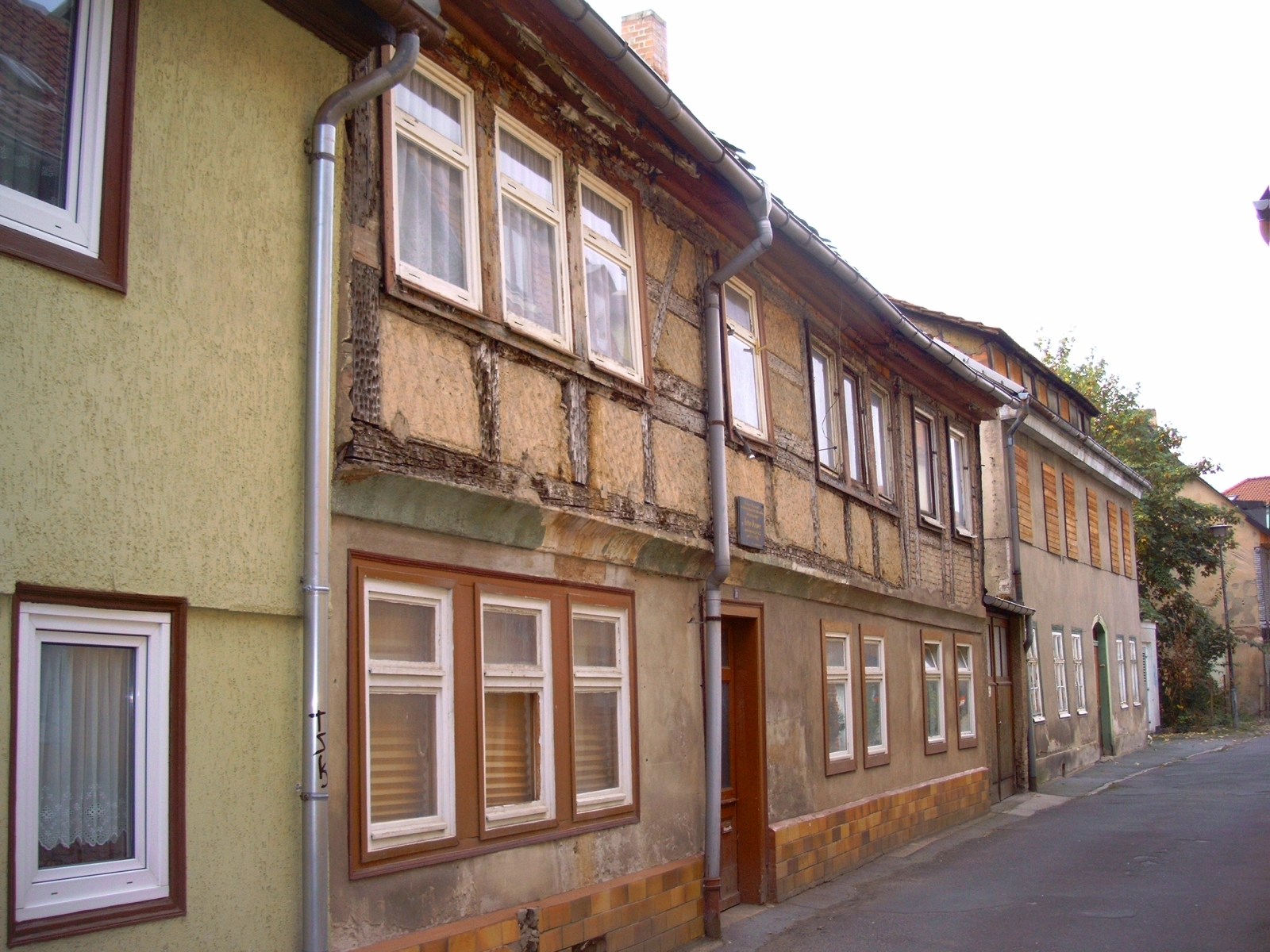
The house in which Anton Sommer lived, in Rudolstadt

Between 1835 and 1838 Sommer studied theology in Jena, after which he turned to teach. In 1850 he returned to his hometown and established a school of his own. He was authorized to preach in the small church in Schaala, now a quarter within Rudolstadt. In 1861 he was appointed garrison preacher in Rudolstadt, and it was here, by now half-blind and from 1881 recognized as an "honored citizen" of the city, that he died.

Sommer's compilation Bilder und Klänge aus Rudolstadt in Volksmundart ("Images and sounds from Rudolstadt in local dialect"), repeatedly updated during his lifetime, was relatively well known for several decades after his death.
