= List of windmills in North Rhine-Westphalia =

A list of windmills in the German Federal State of North Rhine-Westphalia.

Location	Name of mill	Type	Built	Notes	Photograph
Ahaus	Quantwicker Mühle	Erdholländer	1840	Restored 1978	
Alpen	Bönninghardter Mühle	Turmholländer	1865		
Alpen	Schreibers-Mühle	Turmholländer	19th century		
Alpen	Mühle Hoogen	Turmholländer	1890	House conversion	
Alpen-Menzelen	Mosters Mühle Ost	Turmholländer	1865		
Alpen-Menzelen	Mosters Mühle West	Turmholländer	1796	House conversion	
Bedburg-Grottenherten	Grottenherten Mühle; Mühle Bickendorf	Turmholländer	1831		
Bedburg-Hau	Mühle Huisberden	Turmholländer			
Bedburg-Rath	Rather Mühle	Turmholländer	1840		
Bergheim-Büsdorf	Büsdorfer Mühle	Turmholländer	Late 17th century		
Bergheim-Oberaußem	Oberaußemer Mühle	Turmholländer	1813		
Bielefeld	Bauernhausmuseum Mühle	Bockwindmühle			
Borth-Wallach	Kaas'sche Mühle	Turmholländer	1857	House conversion	
Breckerfeld	Mühlenhof Breckerfeld	Bockwindmühle			
Brüggen-Bracht	Brachter Mühle	Turmholländer	1855		
Cologne	Gereons-Mühle	Turmholländer			
Cologne	Kartäuser-Mühle	Turmholländer			
Cologne	Bottmühle	Turmholländer	1587		
Cologne	Pantaleonsmühle	Turmholländer		Burnt out in 1880	
Detmold		Galerieholländer			
Detmold		Bockwindmühle			
Dinslaken-Hiesfeld	Museumsmühle	Turmholländer	1842		
Drensteinfurt		Turmholländer			
Drensteinfurt		Sockelgeschoßholländer			
Duisburg-Baerl	Lohmühle	Turmholländer	1834		
Duisburg-Baerl	Lohmannsmühle	Turmholländer	1805		
Duisburg-Meiderich	Stahlsche Mühle	Turmholländer	1858		
Duisburg Marxloh	Kiebitzmühle	Turmholländer	1856		
Dülken	Narrenmühle	Bockwindmühle	1809		
Düsseldorf-Kaiserswerth	Stadtmühle	Turmholländer	1810	House conversion	
Elsdorf-Niederembt		Turmholländer	1820	House conversion	
Emmerich-Elten	Gerritzen-Mühle	Turmholländer	1846		
Emmerich-Elten	Wittenhorst-Mühle	Turmholländer	1815	House conversion	
Emmerich-Dornick	Mühle Dornick	Turmholländer	17th century	House conversion	
Emmerich-Hüthum	Hüthumer Mühle	Turmholländer	1873	1940's house conversion 2010 roof reconstruction	
Erkelenz	Blancken-Mühle; Pasch Mühle	Turmholländer	1799	House conversion	
Erkelenz-Immerath	Immerather Mühle; Klapperwindmühle	Turmholländer	1780	Demolished 18 October 2018.	
Fritzdorf	Fritzdorfer Mühle	Turmholländer	1842		
Gangelt	Breberer Mühle	Turmholländer	1827		
Geldern	Stadtmühle	Turmholländer	1643		
Geldern	Rayers'sche Mühle	Turmholländer	1858	Stump, house conversion	
Geldern-Veert	Kreativ-Mühle	Turmholländer	1865		
Geldern-Vernum	Vernumermühle	Erdholländer		House conversion	
Geldern-Walbeck	Steprather-Mühle	Turmholländer			
Geldern-Walbeck	Kokerwindmühle	Wippmühle	1770s		
Goch-Hassum	Hassumer Mühle	Turmholländer	1807		
Goch-Kessel	Kesseler Mühle	Turmholländer			
Grevenbroich-Hemmerden	Dycker Mühle	Turmholländer	1756	House conversion	
Hamminkeln	Mühle Wessling	Turmholländer			
Hamminkeln	Mühle Wissing	Turmholländer	1618	House conversion	
Hamminkeln-Brünen	Mühle Wefelnberg	Turmholländer	1850s		
Hamminkeln-Dingden	Nordbrocker Mühle	Turmholländer	1844		
Hamminkeln-Dingden	Mühle Hasselmann	Turmholländer			
Hamminkeln-Dingden	Königs-Mühle	Turmholländer		Used as war memorial	
Hamminkeln-Loikum	Mühle Terhorst	Turmholländer	1856		
Hamminkeln-Mehrhoog	Hollands-Mühle	Turmholländer		Part of foundation remains	
Heinsberg-Aphoven	Aphovener Mühle	Turmholländer		House conversion	
Heinsberg-Kirchhoven	Lümbacher Mühle	Turmholländer	1882		
Holtum	Holtumer Mühle	Sockelgeschoßholländer	2009	Electricity generator, built to look like a traditional windmill.	
Hüllhorst	Mühle Struckhof	Turmholländer			
Hünxe	Hünxer Mühle	Turmholländer	1838		
Isselburg-Anholt	Anholter Mühle	Turmholländer	16th century	house conversion	
Isselburg-Vehlingen	Vehlinger Mühle	Turmholländer			
Isselburg-Werth	Werther Mühle	Turmholländer	1498		
Issum	Herrlichkeitsmühle	Bergholländer	1768		
Issum	Kleinmanns-Mühle	Turmholländer	1870s		
Issum	Hülsmann Mühle	Turmholländer	1855		
Issum-Sevelen	Dahlen-Mühle	Turmholländer	1868		
Jüchen	Jüchener Mühle	Turmholländer	1705		
Jüchen-Hochneukirch	Hochneukircher Mühle	Turmholländer	Early mid-19th century	House conversion	
Kaarst	Kaarster Mühle	Turmholländer	Early mid-19th century		
Kaarst-Büttgen	Mühle Braun	Turmholländer	1756		
Kaarst-Büttgen	Mühle Breuer	Turmholländer	1847		
Kalkar	Stadtmühle	Turmholländer	1770		
Kalkar	Leemühle am Keteltor	Turmholländer		Base only	
Kalkar-Grieth	Griether Mühle	Turmholländer	1821	House conversion	
Kalkar-Neulouisendorf	Neulouisendorfer Mühle	Turmholländer	1863	House conversion	
Kalkar-Niedermörmter	Düffelsmühle	Turmholländer	16th century	Bilau blades	
Kalkar-Wissel	Wisseler Mühle	Turmholländer	1873	Group facility conversion	
Kamp-Lintfort-Niersenbruch	Hermanns-Mühle	Turmholländer	c. 1870		
Kempen	Stadtmühle; Die Queen Mum unter den niederrheinischen Windmühlen	Galerieholländer	1649		
Kempen-St. Hubert	Wackertapp-Mühle	Turmholländer	1859		
Kempen-Tönisberg	Tönisberger Mühle	Bockwindmühle			
Kerken-Nieukerk		Turmholländer	1760s	House conversion	
Kerken-Stenden	Stendener Mühle	Turmholländer		House conversion	
Kevelaer	Hermannsmühle	Turmholländer	1865		
Kevelaer-Achterhoek	Singendonk'sche Mühle	Galerieholländer	1797		
Kevelaer-Kervenheim	Mühle Mott	Erdholländer	1870		
Kevelaer-Twisteden	Mühle van de Braak	Turmholländer	1860		
Kevelaer-Wetten	Wettener Mühle	Turmholländer			
Kevelaer-Winnekendonk	Kerssenboom'sche Mühle	Turmholländer	1849		
Kleve-Donsbrüggen	Mühle von Donsbrüggen	Sockelgeschoßholländer	1813		
Kleve-Griethausen	Griethausener Mühle	Turmholländer	1865	House conversion	
Kleve-Keeken	Paalsche Mühle	Turmholländer	1810	House conversion, retirement house	
Kleve-Kellen	Kreuzmühle	Turmholländer	1845	House conversion	
Kleve-Materborn	Mühle Materborn	Turmholländer	1820	House converted base	
Kleve-Rindern	Rinderner Mühle	Turmholländer	1840	House conversion	
Korschenbroich-Kleinenbroich	Buschfrantzenmühle	Turmholländer	1845		
Korschenbroich-Liedburg		Turmholländer	1572		
Kranenburg	Mühlenturm	Turmholländer	1419	Walltower, 2006 Museum	
Kranenburg-Mehr	Mehrer Mühle	Turmholländer	1840		
Kranenburg-Frasselt	Neuenhofer Mühle	Turmholländer	1880	House conversion	
Kranenburg-Wyler	Wyler Mühle	Sockelgeschoßholländer	1809	Base only	
Krefeld	Egelsberg Mühle	Turmholländer			
Krefeld-Fischeln	Fischelner Mühle	Turmholländer	1813	House conversion	
Krefeld-Oppum	Geismühle	Turmholländer	1575		
Krefeld-Traar	Egelsberg Mühle	Turmholländer	1802		
Krefeld-Traar	Elfrather Mühle	Turmholländer	1823		
Krefeld-Uerdingen	Stadtmühle; Eulenturm	Turmholländer	15th century		
Krefeld-Uerdingen	Buss-Mühle	Turmholländer	1796	House conversion	
Lette		Turmholländer			
Lippetal	Heintrop Mühle	Turmholländer		House conversion	
Lübbecke-Eilhausen	Eilhauser Königsmühle	Erdholländer, later (turn of the century) modified	1748	Deutsche Gesellschaft für Mühlenkunde und Mühlenerhaltung e.V. (in German)	
Mechernich-Kommern		Bockwindmühle			
Meerbusch-Lank	Teloy-Mühle	Turmholländer	1822		
Meerbusch-Lank	Heidburgsmühle	Turmholländer	1750		
Meerbusch-Osterath	Osterather Mühle	Turmholländer	1883		
Merzenich		Turmholländer			
Minden-Rodenbeck		Turmholländer	1821		
Mönchengladbach	Lohmühle	Turmholländer	1828		
Mönchengladbach-Giesenkirchen	Giesenkirchener Mühle	Turmholländer	1841		
Mönchengladbach-Rheindahlen	Gerkerather Mühle	Turmholländer	1733		
Mönchengladbach-Rheindahlen	Schriefersmühle (Writers' Mill); 51°08′10″N 6°20′26″E	Turmholländer	1722		
Münster	Freilichtmuseum Münster	Bockwindmühle			
Nettetal-Breyll	Schaag Mühle	Turmholländer	1801	House conversion	
Nettetal-Hinsbeck	Stammenmühle	Turmholländer	1854		
Nettetal-Kaldenkirchen	Backes-Mühle	Turmholländer	1848		
Neukirchen-Vluyn	Rayener Mühle	Turmholländer	1820		
Neukirchen-Vluyn	Alte Mühle	Turmholländer	1874		
Neukirchen-Vluyn	Neue Mühle	Turmholländer	1840	House conversion	
Neuss	Stadtmühle	Turmholländer	15th century	converted to water tower<	
Oberhausen-Holten	Holtener Mühle; Brahm'sche Mühle	Turmholländer	1838		
Oberhausen-Holten	Baumeister Mühle	Turmholländer	1858		
Ochtrup		Bergmühle	1848		
Petershagen-Bierde		Sockelgeschoßholländer			
Petershagen-Lahde		Turmholländer			
Petershagen-Meßlingen		Galerieholländer			
Petershagen-Seelenfeld		Turmholländer			
Pulheim	Pulheimer Mühle	Turmholländer			
Pulheim	Brauweiler Mühle	Turmholländer	1805		
Pulheim-Stommeln	Stommelner Mühle	Turmholländer	1704		
Rees	Stadtmühle	Turmholländer			
Rees	Scholten Mühle	Turmholländer	1849		
Rees-Bienen	Mühle Berg	Turmholländer	1850	House conversion	
Rees-Bienen	Mühle Rosau	Turmholländer	19th century	Former watchtower	
Rees-Haldern	Halderner Mühle	Turmholländer	1860		
Rees-Esserden	Hermanns Mühle	Turmholländer	1850	House conversion	
Rheinberg-Eversael	Drießener Mühle	Turmholländer		Restored	
Reken		Turmholländer			
Rheinberg-Budberg	Marienkirch	Turmholländer	1842	Converted to church	
Rheinberg-Orsoy	Pulverturm	Turmholländer	Early 17th century		
Rheinberg-Ossenberg	Bütener Mühle	Turmholländer	1470		
Rheinhausen	Bergheimer Mühle	Bergholländer	1794		
Rheinhausen	Freimersheimer Mühle	Turmholländer	1871		
Rheurdt	Straetmannsburger Mühle	Turmholländer			
Rheurdt-Schaephuysen	Michael-Turm	Turmholländer	1874		
Schermbeck-Damm	Dammer Mühle	Turmholländer			
Schermbeck-Vosshövel	Blumbergs-Mühle	Turmholländer	1837		
Schwalmtal-Amern	Printzen-Mühle	Turmholländer			
Schwalmtal-Waldniel	Berger-Mühle	Turmholländer	1835		
Selm		Turmholländer		Ruin	
Sonsbeck	Gommann'sche Mühle	Turmholländer	1840		
Sonsbeck-Balberg	Balberger Mühle	Sockelgeschoßholländer	1836	Base only	
Sonsbeck-Labbeck	Labbecker Mühle	Turmholländer	1853	Converted to Youth Hostel	
Sonsbeck-Römerturm	Gräflich Klevische Mühle	Turmholländer			
Stemwede	Destel Mühle	Sockelgeschoßholländer			
Stemwede	Levern Mühle	Galerieholländer			
Straelen	Mühle am Gieselberg	Sockelgeschoßholländer	1851		
Straelen-Broekhuysen	Mühle op den Boekel	Turmholländer			
Straelen-Herongen	Tissen Mühle	Turmholländer		House conversion	
Straelen-Herongen	Jennen Mühle	Turmholländer		Stump	
Titz	Dueppelsmuehle	Bockwindmühle			
Titz-Höllen		Bockwindmühle		Trestle only	
Tönisvorst-St Tönis	Streuff-Mühle	Turmholländer	c. 1776		
Uedem	Hohe Mühle	Turmholländer	1827		
Unna-Königsborn		Galerieholländer	1750		
Voerde-Götterswickerhamm	Mühle Götterswickerhamm; Haus Storchenest	Turmholländer	1849	House conversion	
Waldfeucht	Waldfeuchter Mühle	Erdholländer	1897		
Waldfeucht-Bocket	Roche-Mühle also known as Dampfmühle	Turmholländer	1752	Base only	
Waldfeucht-Haaren	Haarener Mühle	Turmholländer	1842		
Waldfeucht-Frilinghoven	Bocketer Mühle	Turmholländer	1840		
Waldfeucht-Löcken	Löckener Mühle	Turmholländer	1873		
Wassenberg	Wingersmühle	Turmholländer	1778		
Weeze-Wemb	Stammen Mühle; Wember Tonne	Turmholländer	1840	House conversion	
Wesel-Buderich	Mühle van Geldern	Turmholländer	1861	House conversion	
Wesel-Bislich-Diersfordt	Raads Mühle	Turmholländer	1892	Ruin	
Wesel-Bislich-Diersfordt	Diersfordter Mühle	Turmholländer	1792	Stump only	
Wesel-Obrighoven	Mühle Körner	Turmholländer	1868	House conversion	
Wesel-Obrighoven	Mühle Beckmann	Turmholländer		House conversion	
Willich	Liffersmühle	Turmholländer	1840	Base only	
Xanten	Siegfried Mühle; Biermanns Mühle	Galerieholländer	1744		
Xanten	Kriemhild Mühle	Galerieholländer	Mid-18th century	in use	
Xanten -Obermörmter	Harderings Mühle	Turmholländer	1896		
Xanten-Wardt	Harderings Mühle	Turmholländer	1864		
Zons	Stadtmühle	Galerieholländer	Late 14th century	Rheinischer Mühlenverband (in German)	
