= Niederzimmern =

- Ortsteil of Grammetal
- Interactive map of Niederzimmern
- Location within Germany Location within Thuringia
- Coordinates: 51°0′19″N 11°11′20″E
- Country: Germany
- State: Thuringia
- District: Weimarer Land
- Municipality: Grammetal

Area
  - Total: 13.22 km^{2} (5.10 sq mi)
- Elevation: 200 m (660 ft)

Population (2018-12-31)
  - Total: 1,032
  - Density: 78.06/km^{2} (202.2/sq mi)
- Time zone: UTC+01:00 (CET)
  - Summer (DST): UTC+02:00 (CEST)
- Postal codes: 99428
- Dialling codes: 036203
- Vehicle registration: AP

Niederzimmern (German pronunciation: [ˈniːdɐˌtsɪmɐn]) is a village and a former municipality in the Weimarer Land district of Thuringia, Germany. Since December 2019, it is part of the municipality Grammetal.
