= Bechstedtstraß =

- Ortsteil of Grammetal
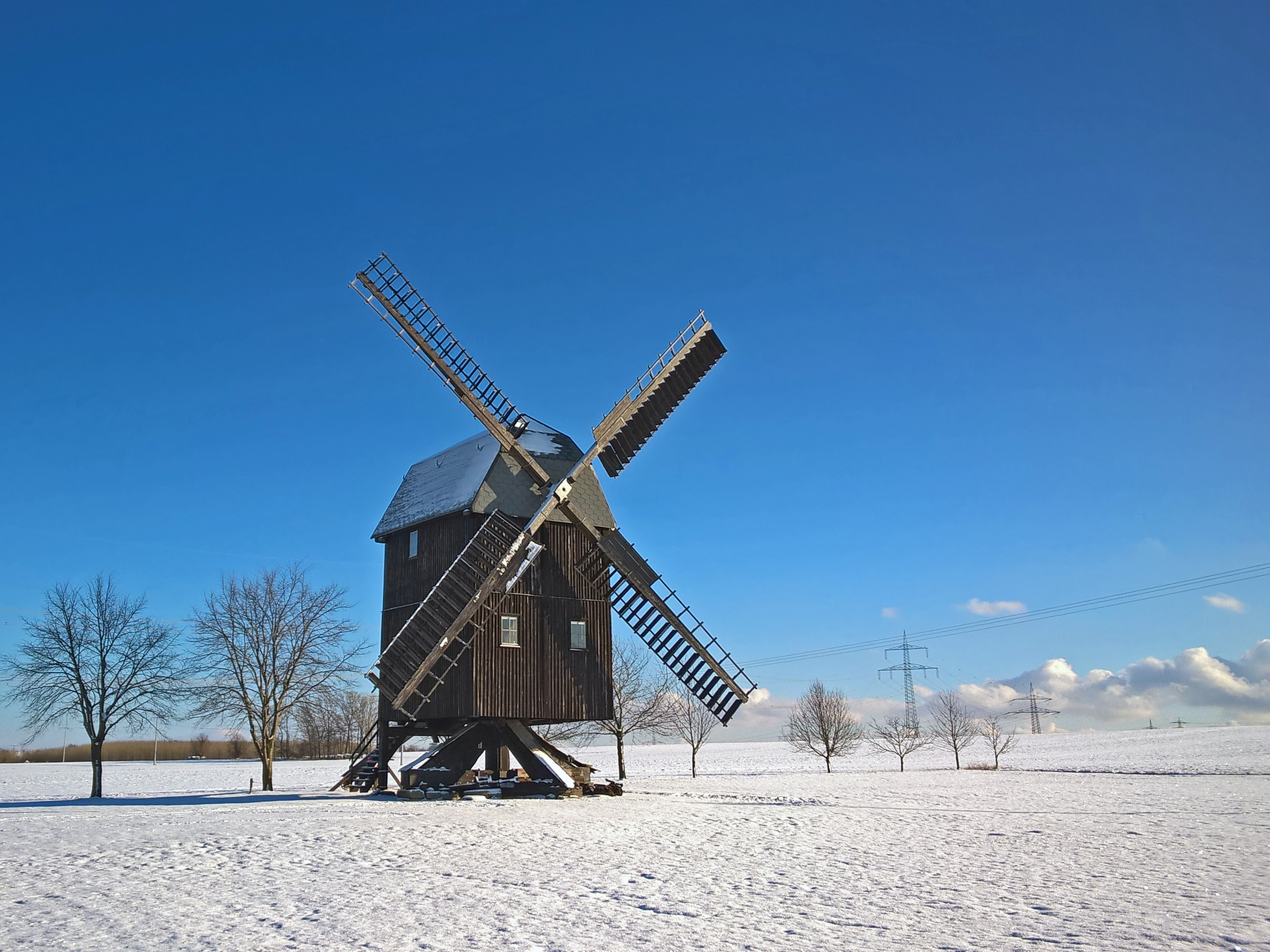
- Interactive map of Bechstedtstraß
- Location within Germany Location within Thuringia
- Coordinates: 50°56′56″N 11°11′46″E
- Country: Germany
- State: Thuringia
- District: Weimarer Land
- Municipality: Grammetal

Area
  - Total: 5.75 km^{2} (2.22 sq mi)
- Elevation: 335 m (1,099 ft)

Population (2018-12-31)
  - Total: 267
  - Density: 46.4/km^{2} (120/sq mi)
- Time zone: UTC+01:00 (CET)
  - Summer (DST): UTC+02:00 (CEST)
- Postal codes: 99428
- Dialling codes: 03643
- Vehicle registration: AP

Bechstedtstraß (German pronunciation: [ˈbɛçʃtɛtˌʃtʁaːs]) is a village and a former municipality in the Weimarer Land district of Thuringia, Germany. Since December 2019, it is part of the municipality Grammetal.
