= Windeberg =

- Ortsteil of Mühlhausen
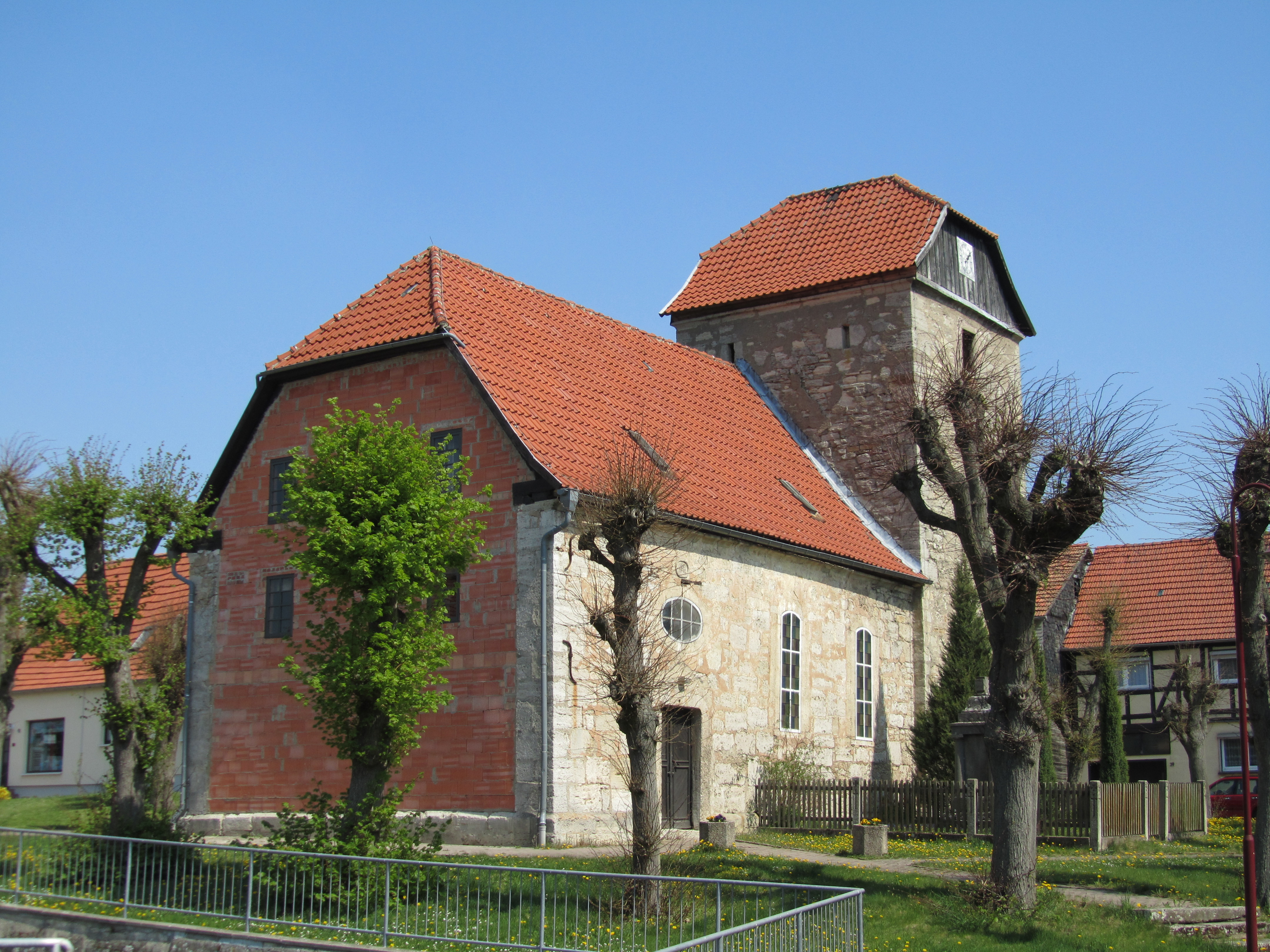
- St Nicholas's Church
- Interactive map of Windeberg
- Location within Germany Location within Thuringia
- Coordinates: 51.272213°N 10.512147°E
- Country: Germany
- State: Thuringia
- District: Unstrut-Hainich-Kreis
- Town: Mühlhausen
- First mentioned: 1296

Government
  - Mayor: Ronald Haase
- Elevation: 344 m (1,129 ft)

Population (March 2021)
  - Total: 237
- Time zone: UTC+01:00 (CET)
  - Summer (DST): UTC+02:00 (CEST)
- Postal codes: 99974
- Dialling codes: 03601, 036029
- Vehicle registration: UH, LSZ, MHL
- Website: muehlhausen.de

Windeberg (German pronunciation: [ˈvɪndəˌbɛʁk]) is a village and quarter of the town of Mühlhausen in Thuringia, central Germany.

== Geography ==
Windeberg lies on the edge of the southern slope of the Dün at the transition to the Thuringian Basin, 6 kilometres (3.7 mi) north-east of the core town of Mühlhausen. The Forstberg (395 metres (1,296 ft) above NN) lies to the south and the Flachstal (Flax Valley) nature reserve to the west. There are transport links via the Landesstraßen (state roads) 1016 and 2041.

== History ==
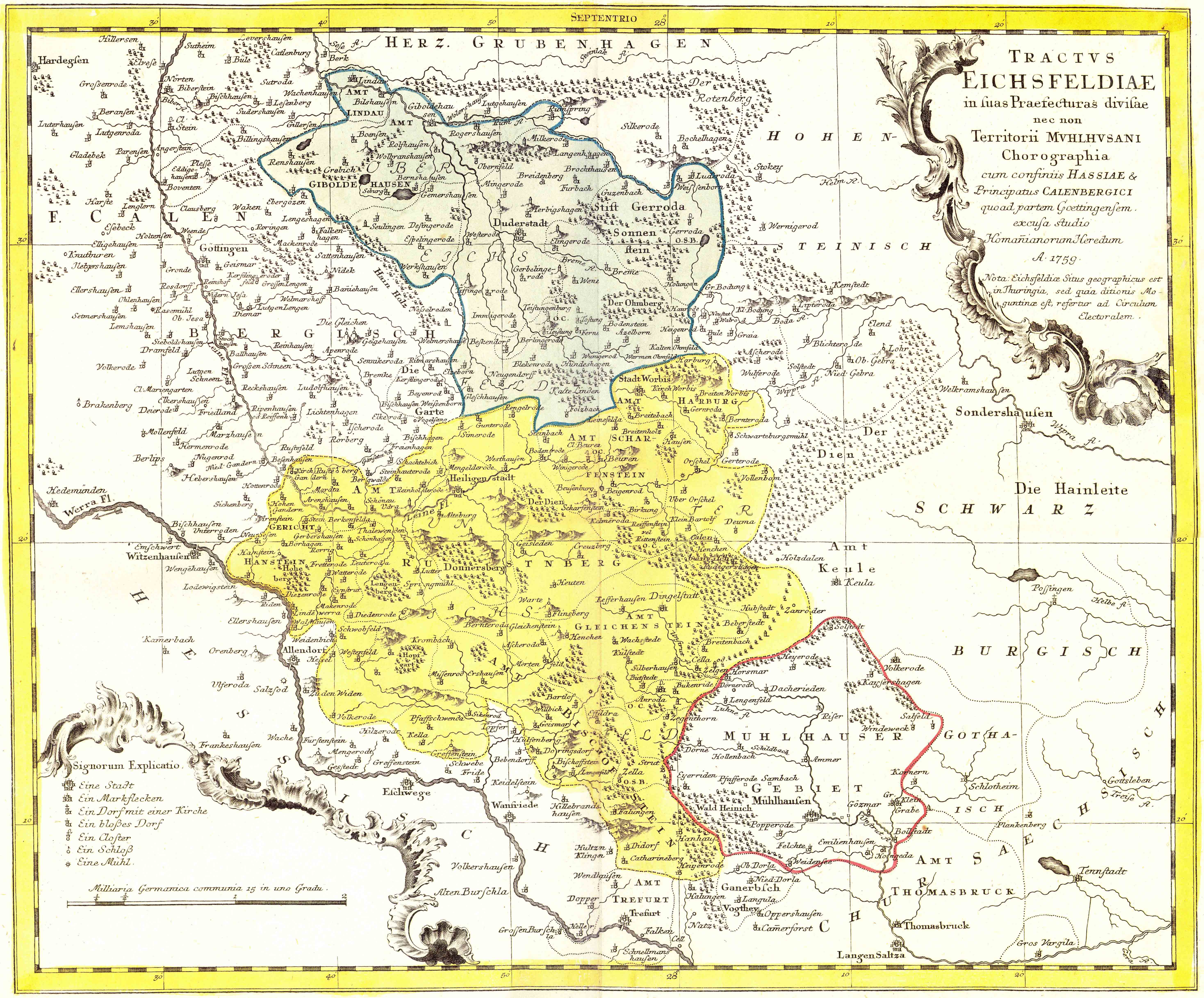
The Eichsfeld region and the territory of the Reichsstadt (imperial city) of Mühlhausen with Windeweck (Windeberg) around 1759 (the map contains some errors)

The village was first mentioned in a document on 29 August 1296. For centuries, it belonged to the sphere of influence of the Reichsstadt (imperial city) of Mühlhausen. In 1565, the (male) population of Windeberg was 45. In 1750, much of the village, including the village church, fell victim to a fire. In 1802, Windeberg, together with Mühlhausen, fell to the Kingdom of Prussia, from 1807 to 1813 to the Kingdom of Westphalia (canton Dachrieden) created by Napoleon, and after the Congress of Vienna in 1816, it was assigned to the Landkreis Mühlhausen i. Th. in the Prussian Province of Saxony. On 1 June 1992, Windeberg was incorporated into Mühlhausen.

== Sights ==
- St Nicholas's Church
- Memorial for the victims of both world wars in the churchyard in front of the village church
