= Nauendorf, Thuringia =

Nauendorf
- Municipality
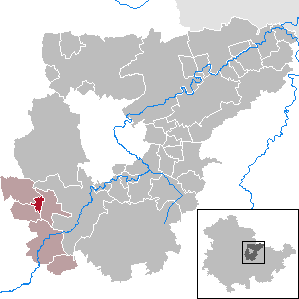
- Location of Nauendorf within Weimarer Land district
- Interactive map of Nauendorf
- Location within Germany Location within Thuringia
- Coordinates: 50°53′40″N 11°10′49″E
- Country: Germany
- State: Thuringia
- District: Weimarer Land
- Municipal assoc.: Kranichfeld

Government
  - Mayor (2020–26): Marek Heusinger

Area
  - Total: 2.37 km^{2} (0.92 sq mi)
- Elevation: 335 m (1,099 ft)

Population (2025-12-31)
  - Total: 309
  - Density: 130/km^{2} (338/sq mi)
- Time zone: UTC+01:00 (CET)
  - Summer (DST): UTC+02:00 (CEST)
- Postal codes: 99448
- Dialling codes: 036209
- Vehicle registration: AP
- Website: VG Kranichfeld.de

Nauendorf (German pronunciation: [ˈnaʊəndɔʁf]) is a municipality in the Weimarer Land district of Thuringia, Germany.
