= Rittersdorf, Thuringia =

Rittersdorf
- Municipality
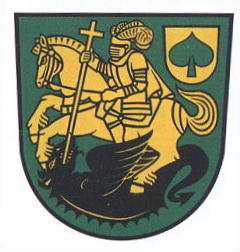
- Coat of arms

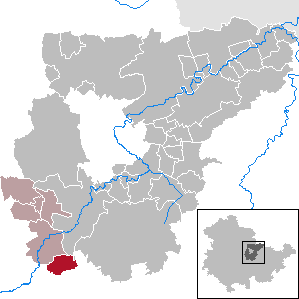
- Location of Rittersdorf within Weimarer Land district
- Interactive map of Rittersdorf
- Location within Germany Location within Thuringia
- Coordinates: 50°49′8″N 11°14′4″E
- Country: Germany
- State: Thuringia
- District: Weimarer Land
- Municipal assoc.: Kranichfeld

Government
  - Mayor (2022–28): Ellen Huschke

Area
  - Total: 8.76 km^{2} (3.38 sq mi)
- Elevation: 458 m (1,503 ft)

Population (2025-12-31)
  - Total: 268
  - Density: 30.6/km^{2} (79.2/sq mi)
- Time zone: UTC+01:00 (CET)
  - Summer (DST): UTC+02:00 (CEST)
- Postal codes: 99448
- Dialling codes: 036450
- Vehicle registration: AP
- Website: www.rittersdorf.info

Rittersdorf is a municipality in the Weimarer Land district of Thuringia, Germany.
