= Saaleplatte =

- Municipality
- Interactive map of Saaleplatte
- Location within Germany Location within Thuringia
- Coordinates: 51°1′48″N 11°36′1″E
- Country: Germany
- State: Thuringia
- District: Weimarer Land
- Disbanded: 2019
- Subdivisions: 9

Area
  - Total: 42.83 km^{2} (16.54 sq mi)
- Elevation: 265 m (869 ft)

Population (2006-12-31)
  - Total: 3,147
  - Density: 73.48/km^{2} (190.3/sq mi)
- Time zone: UTC+01:00 (CET)
  - Summer (DST): UTC+02:00 (CEST)
- Postal codes: 99510
- Vehicle registration: AP
- Website: www.saaleplatte.info

Saaleplatte (German pronunciation: [ˈzaːləˌplatə], lit. 'Saale Plateau') is a former municipality in the Weimarer Land district of Thuringia, Germany. On 31 December 2019, it was merged into the town Bad Sulza.
