= Schmiedehausen =

- Municipality
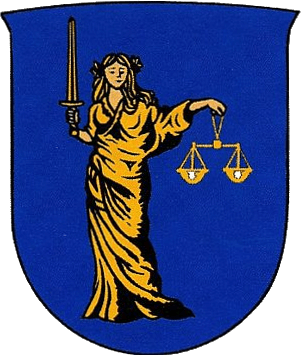
- Coat of arms

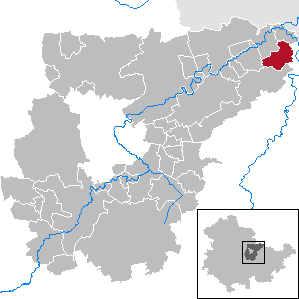
- Location of Schmiedehausen within Weimarer Land district
- Interactive map of Schmiedehausen
- Location within Germany Location within Thuringia
- Coordinates: 51°4′7″N 11°39′52″E
- Country: Germany
- State: Thuringia
- District: Weimarer Land

Government
  - Mayor (2022–28): Marco Hinsch

Area
  - Total: 10.37 km^{2} (4.00 sq mi)
- Elevation: 225 m (738 ft)

Population (2025-12-31)
  - Total: 344
  - Density: 33.2/km^{2} (85.9/sq mi)
- Time zone: UTC+01:00 (CET)
  - Summer (DST): UTC+02:00 (CEST)
- Postal codes: 99518
- Dialling codes: 036421
- Vehicle registration: AP
- Website: www.bad-sulza.de

Schmiedehausen is a municipality in the Weimarer Land district of Thuringia, Germany. Schmiedehausen is located in the extreme northeastern corner of the Saale-Ilm-limestone slab and is easily accessible by road via Camburg and Bad Sulza. The district of the town is developed for agricultural purposes. The wooded hills of the Ilm valley start at Bergsulza.
