= Klettbach =

- Municipality
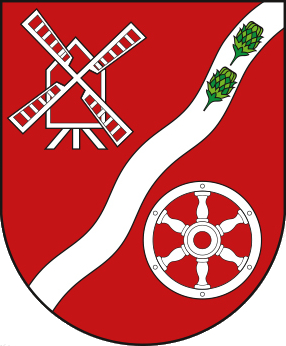
- Coat of arms

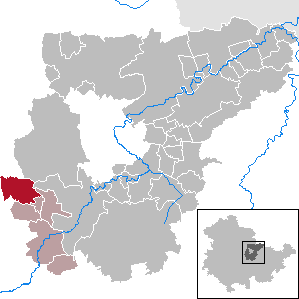
- Location of Klettbach within Weimarer Land district
- Interactive map of Klettbach
- Location within Germany Location within Thuringia
- Coordinates: 50°54′51″N 11°9′0″E
- Country: Germany
- State: Thuringia
- District: Weimarer Land

Government
  - Mayor: André Köhler

Area
  - Total: 15.23 km^{2} (5.88 sq mi)
- Elevation: 385 m (1,263 ft)

Population (2025-12-31)
  - Total: 1,239
  - Density: 81.35/km^{2} (210.7/sq mi)
- Time zone: UTC+01:00 (CET)
  - Summer (DST): UTC+02:00 (CEST)
- Postal codes: 99102
- Dialling codes: 036209
- Vehicle registration: AP
- Website: www.klettbach.de

Klettbach is a municipality in the Weimarer Land district of Thuringia, Germany.
