= Bad Sulza =

- Town
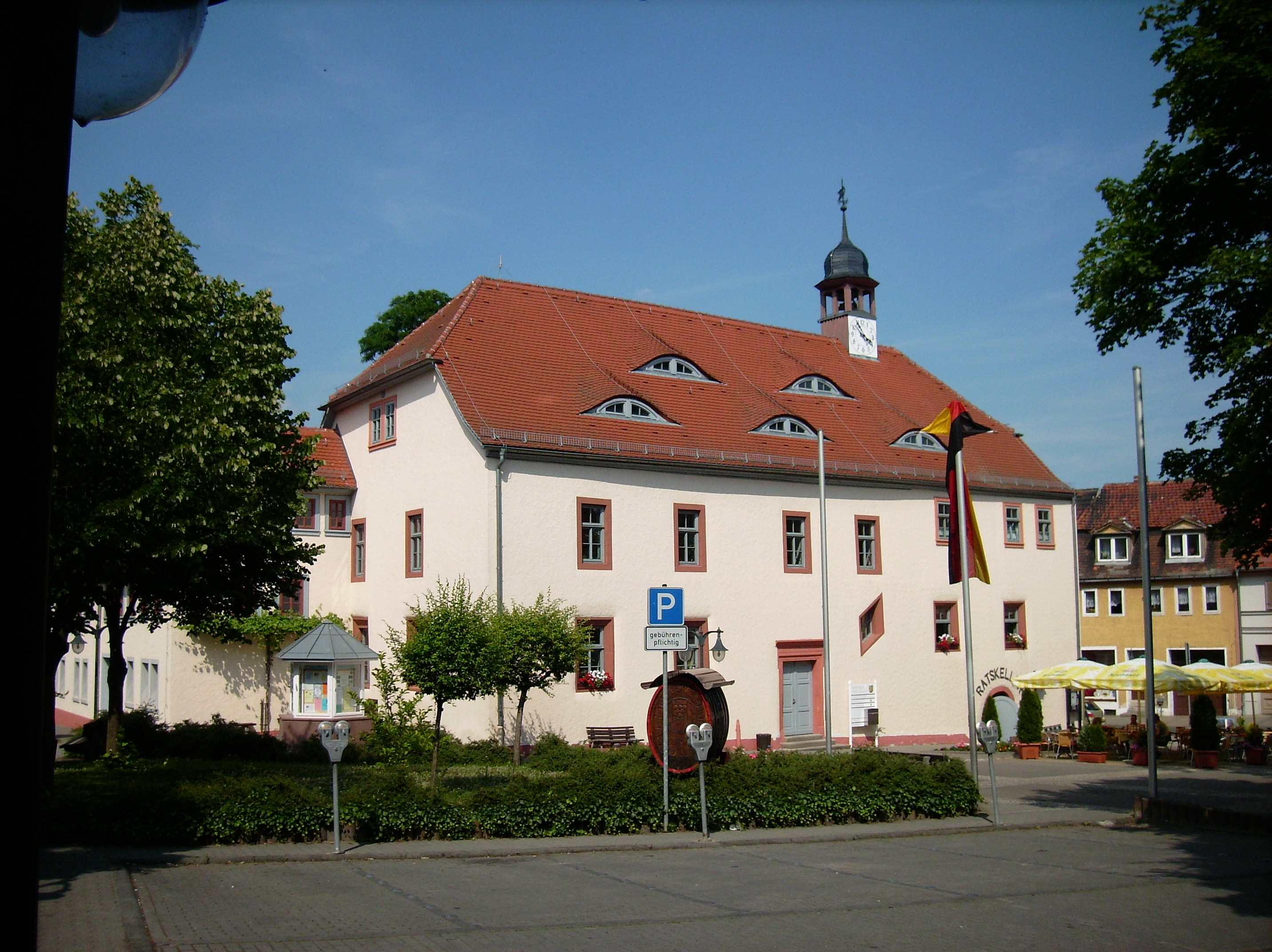
- Town hall

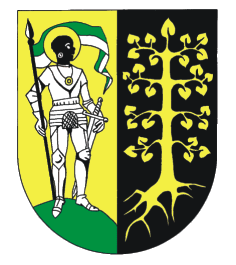
- Coat of arms

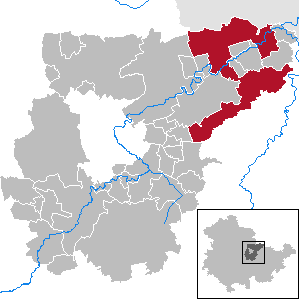
- Location of Bad Sulza within Weimarer Land district
- Interactive map of Bad Sulza
- Location within Germany Location within Thuringia
- Coordinates: 51°5′15″N 11°37′20″E
- Country: Germany
- State: Thuringia
- District: Weimarer Land

Government
  - Mayor (2024–30): Dirk Schütze

Area
  - Total: 94.1 km^{2} (36.3 sq mi)
- Elevation: 140 m (460 ft)

Population (2025-12-31)
  - Total: 8,001
  - Density: 85.0/km^{2} (220/sq mi)
- Time zone: UTC+01:00 (CET)
  - Summer (DST): UTC+02:00 (CEST)
- Postal codes: 99518, 99510 (Flurstedt, Gebstedt, Wickerstedt)
- Dialling codes: 036461
- Vehicle registration: AP, APD
- Website: www.bad-sulza.de

Bad Sulza (German pronunciation: [baːt ˈzʊltsa]) is a town in the Weimarer Land district, in Thuringia, Germany. It is situated on the river Ilm, 15 km southwest of Naumburg, and 18 km north of Jena.

== History ==
Within the German Empire (1871-1918), Bad Sulza was part of the Grand Duchy of Saxe-Weimar-Eisenach. The former municipality Ködderitzsch was merged into Bad Sulza in January 2019, and Saaleplatte in December 2019. In January 2023 Bad Sulza absorbed the former municipality Rannstedt.

=== Notable citizens ===
- Johann Agricola (1590-1668), superintendent of the salt plant from 1622 to 1631, used the healing power of Sulza brine for therapeutic purposes.
- Adolf Piltz (1855-1940), German mathematician notable for his work in number theory.

=== Associated with the city ===
- Thomas Naogeorgus (actually Kirchmair) (1508-1563), theologian, Neo-Latin poet and playwright
