= Hopfgarten, Thuringia =

Hopfgarten
- Ortsteil of Grammetal
- Interactive map of Hopfgarten
- Location within Germany Location within Thuringia
- Coordinates: 50°59′11″N 11°13′15″E
- Country: Germany
- State: Thuringia
- District: Weimarer Land
- Municipality: Grammetal

Area
  - Total: 9.11 km^{2} (3.52 sq mi)
- Elevation: 235 m (771 ft)

Population (2018-12-31)
  - Total: 673
  - Density: 73.9/km^{2} (191/sq mi)
- Time zone: UTC+01:00 (CET)
  - Summer (DST): UTC+02:00 (CEST)
- Postal codes: 99428
- Dialling codes: 03643
- Vehicle registration: AP

Hopfgarten (German pronunciation: [ˈhɔpfˌɡaʁtn̩]) is a village and a former municipality in the Weimarer Land district of Thuringia, Germany. Since December 2019, it is part of the municipality Grammetal.
