= Weimarer Land =

Coordinates: 51°00′N 11°25′E

- District
- Flag Coat of arms
- Country: Germany
- State: Thuringia
- Capital: Apolda

Government
  - District admin.: Christiane Schmidt-Rose (CDU)

Area
  - Total: 804.47 km^{2} (310.61 sq mi)

Population (31 December 2025)
  - Total: 82,392
  - Density: 102.42/km^{2} (265.26/sq mi)
- Time zone: UTC+01:00 (CET)
  - Summer (DST): UTC+02:00 (CEST)
- Vehicle registration: AP, APD
- Website: www.weimarerland.de

Weimarer Land is a Landkreis (district) in the east of Thuringia, Germany. Neighboring districts are (from the northeast clockwise) the district Burgenlandkreis in Saxony-Anhalt, the district Saale-Holzland and the district-free city Jena, the district Saalfeld-Rudolstadt, Ilm-Kreis, and the district-free city Erfurt. The district-free city Weimar is completely enclosed by the district.

== History ==
The district dates back to the Großkreis Weimar, which was created in 1922 after the federal state Thuringia was established. The two cities Weimar and Apolda were not part of the district. In 1952 the district was split into two parts - Weimar and Apolda. In 1994 the two parts were merged again, however not completely covering the territory as before 1952.

== Geography ==
The main river in the district is the Ilm. To the south are the hills of the Thuringian Forest, where the highest elevation is the Riechheimer Berg with 511 m above sea level. To the north of the district the landscape becomes less hilly, it belongs to the Thüringer Becken. In this part is also the lowest elevation with 120 m, at the meeting of the rivers Ilm and Saale. Near Bad Salza starts the Saale-Unstrut wine route, as the viticulture in the district has a tradition of more than 800 years.

== Coat of arms ==
The coat of arms shows symbols of the historic states on the territory of the district. The lion to the right stands for the dukes of Saxe-Weimar-Eisenach, the top left displays the Wheel of Mainz, and the three apples are the symbol of Apolda, as they were used in the coat of arms of the governors of Apolda. The coat of arms were granted on November 24, 1994.

== Towns and municipalities ==
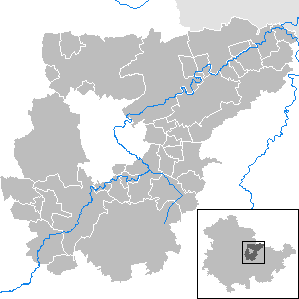
Clickable map of towns and municipalities in the district

Verwaltungsgemeinschaft-free towns
and municipalities
1. Apolda
2. Bad Berka
3. Bad Sulza
4. Blankenhain
5. Neumark
1. Am Ettersberg
2. Ballstedt
3. Eberstedt
4. Ettersburg
5. Grammetal
6. Großheringen
7. Ilmtal-Weinstraße
8. Niedertrebra
9. Obertrebra
10. Schmiedehausen

Verwaltungsgemeinschaften
1. Kranichfeld; 1. Hohenfelden; 2. Klettbach; 3. Kranichfeld^{1, 2}; 4. Nauendorf; 5. Rittersdorf; 6. Tonndorf	2. Mellingen; 1. Buchfart; 2. Döbritschen; 3. Frankendorf; 4. Großschwabhausen; 5. Hammerstedt; 6. Hetschburg; 7. Kapellendorf; 8. Lehnstedt; 9. Magdala^{2}; 10. Mellingen^{1}; 11. Oettern; 12. Umpferstedt; 13. Vollersroda; 14. Wiegendorf
^{1}seat of the Verwaltungsgemeinschaft; ^{2}town
