= Nordkreis Weimar =

Former administrative unit in Thuringia, Germany

Coordinates: 51.06°N 11.31°E

Nordkreis Weimar is a former Verwaltungsgemeinschaft in the district Weimarer Land in Thuringia, Germany. It was formed on 31 December 2013 by the merger of the former Verwaltungsgemeinschaften Berlstedt and Buttelstedt. The seat of the Verwaltungsgemeinschaft was in Berlstedt. It was disbanded in January 2019.

The Verwaltungsgemeinschaft Nordkreis Weimar consisted of the following municipalities:

1. Ballstedt
2. Berlstedt
3. Buttelstedt
4. Ettersburg
5. Großobringen
6. Heichelheim
7. Kleinobringen
8. Krautheim
9. Leutenthal
10. Neumark
11. Ramsla
12. Rohrbach
13. Sachsenhausen
14. Schwerstedt
15. Vippachedelhausen
16. Wohlsborn
