= Buttelstedt (Verwaltungsgemeinschaft) =

Former Verwaltungsgemeinschaft in the district Weimarer Land in Thuringia, Germany

Coordinates: 51.074°N 11.341°E

Buttelstedt is a former Verwaltungsgemeinschaft in the district Weimarer Land in Thuringia, Germany. The seat of the Verwaltungsgemeinschaft was in Buttelstedt. It was disbanded on 31 December 2013, when it was merged with the Verwaltungsgemeinschaft Berlstedt to form the new Verwaltungsgemeinschaft Nordkreis Weimar.

The Verwaltungsgemeinschaft Buttelstedt consisted of the following municipalities:

1. Buttelstedt
2. Großobringen
3. Heichelheim
4. Kleinobringen
5. Leutenthal
6. Rohrbach
7. Sachsenhausen
8. Wohlsborn
