= Berlstedt (Verwaltungsgemeinschaft) =

Coordinates: 51.061°N 11.244°E

Berlstedt is a former Verwaltungsgemeinschaft in the district Weimarer Land in Thuringia, Germany. The seat of the Verwaltungsgemeinschaft was in Berlstedt. It was disbanded on 31 December 2013, when it was merged with the Verwaltungsgemeinschaft Buttelstedt to form the new Verwaltungsgemeinschaft Nordkreis Weimar.

The Verwaltungsgemeinschaft Berlstedt consisted of the following municipalities:

1. Ballstedt
2. Berlstedt
3. Ettersburg
4. Krautheim
5. Neumark
6. Ramsla
7. Schwerstedt
8. Vippachedelhausen
