= Johann Tobias Krebs =

German organist and composer (1690 - 1762)

- Born: 7 July 1690; Heichelheim
- Died: 11 February 1762 (aged 71); Buttstädt
- Era: Baroque
- Children: 3 sons, including Johann Ludwig

Johann Tobias Krebs (7 July 1690 – 11 February 1762) was a German organist and composer, today best remembered as the father of Johann Ludwig Krebs, one of Bach's most accomplished pupils.

Krebs was born in Heichelheim and went to school in the nearby Weimar. Nothing is known about his early musical training, but at age 20 Krebs was proficient enough at the keyboard to be invited to become organist at Buttelstedt, another town in the same area. Krebs accepted, but continued his music studies in Weimar, travelling there twice a week to study with Johann Gottfried Walther, and later with Johann Sebastian Bach. In 1721 he was accepted a position at Buttstädt, where he played the organ of Michaeliskirche and taught at the school. Krebs remained in Buttstädt for the rest of his life. He had three sons, and the eldest, Johann Ludwig Krebs, became a well-known composer.

Krebs' surviving works are scarce. A few chorale preludes preserved in manuscripts show a marked fondness for counterpoint. Two of the lesser known pieces from the Bach-Werke-Verzeichnis catalogue may have been composed by Krebs:

- Chorale prelude Nun komm, der Heiden Heiland, BWV 660b, an arrangement of one of Bach's Leipzig Chorales, Nun komm, der Heiden Heiland, BWV 660
- Trio in C minor, BWV Anh. 46, a contrapuntal trio which bears some similarity to Bach's organ trio sonatas

In addition, Johann Tobias Krebs and his eldest son are among the list of potential composers of the Eight Short Preludes and Fugues, BWV 553–560, once attributed to Bach.
