= Johann Joseph Schmeller =

German painter

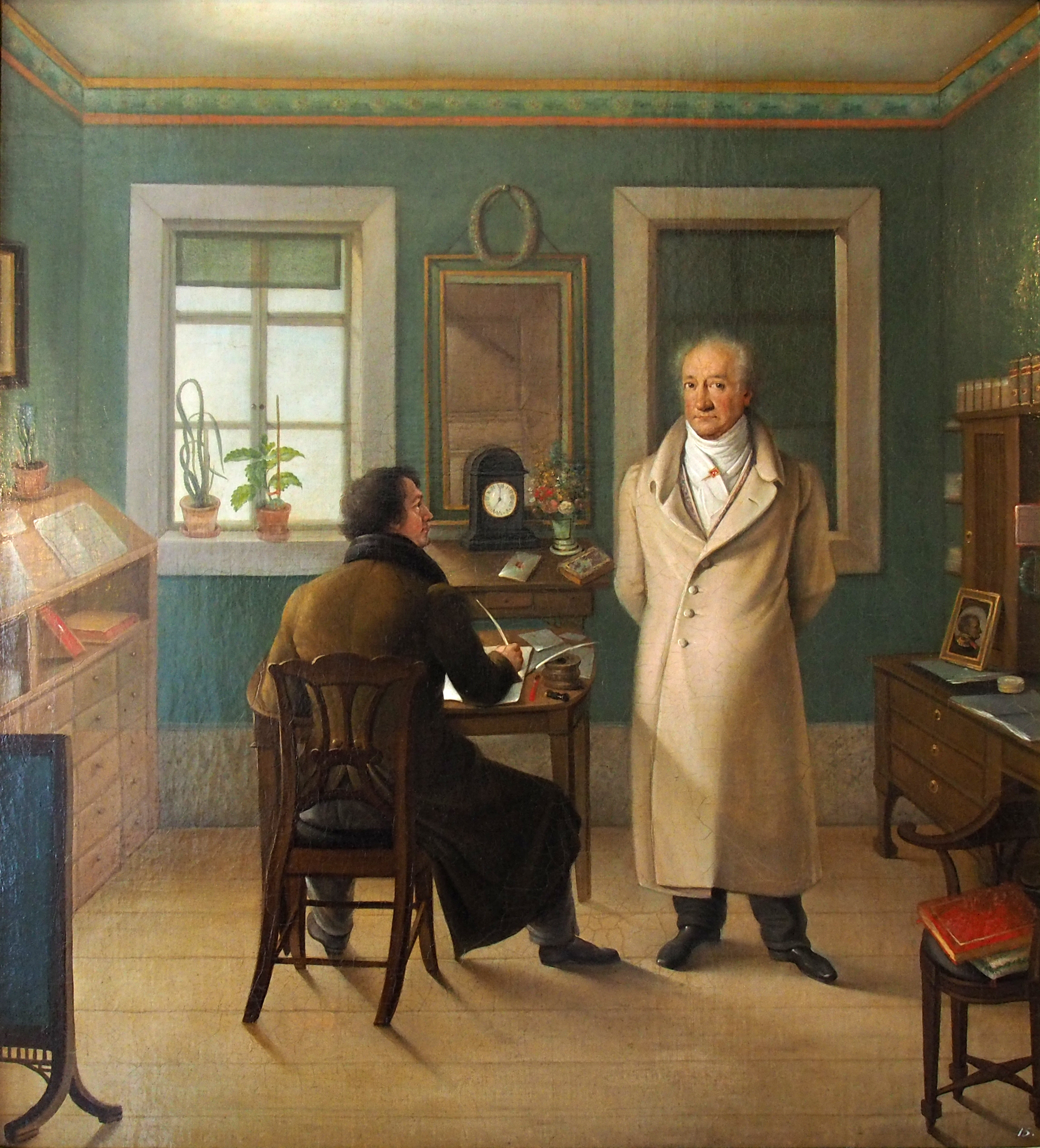
Schmeller, Dictating to His Scribe

Johann Joseph Schmeller (12 July 1796, Großobringen - 1 October 1841, Weimar) was a German painter who was closely associated with Johann Wolfgang von Goethe.

== Biography ==
He was one of five children born to Johann Michael Schmeller (1773–1850), a forestry worker in Ettersburg, and his wife, Dorothea Eva Böhmel (1766–1814), from Buchfart. In 1807, his good reading and writing skills encouraged his father to send him to school in Weimar. During the Napoleonic Wars, Karl August, Grand Duke of Saxe-Weimar-Eisenach, issued a call for the formation of a volunteer corps, and Schmeller joined. While in service, he met Ferdinand Jagemann, who would later become a co-director of the Weimar Princely Free Drawing School.

After the war, Jagemann took him into the school and supported him financially. After 1815, he worked as an assistant teacher. In 1818, he requested additional support from Goethe. As a test, he was hired to restore some wall paintings by Adam Friedrich Oeser in Goethe's greenhouses. He was engaged in that project until 1820. That was when Jagemann unexpectedly died, and his patronage ended. Nevertheless, he was able to afford a trip to Antwerp to further his studies; taking classes with Mathieu Ignace van Brée. He returned to Weimar in 1823, expressed his wish to work as a teacher at the Drawing School and was accepted.

In 1827, Duke Karl August had seen a painting by Albrecht Dürer (The Crucifixion of Christ) and was looking for an artist to make a copy. He asked Goethe, who recommended Schmeller. After the publicity surrounding that project, Schmeller began to receive numerous portrait commissions from the Weimar bourgeoisie. The Duke died in 1828, but a visit from the physician and painter, Carl Gustav Carus led to major commissions from the "Gesellschaft Deutscher Naturforscher und Ärzte" (Society of German Natural Scientists and Doctors). In 1836, on their behalf, he went to Jena, where he produced portraits of notable members, including Christian Ehrenberg, Hinrich Lichtenstein, Heinrich Göppert, Johann Heinrich von Mädler and Joseph Johann von Littrow.

In 1840, a new art program that he was planning to direct was defunded. He died the following year, from an inflammation of the liver.

== Sources ==
- Johann Joseph Schmeller. Ein Porträtist im Dienste Goethes, Klassik Stiftung Weimar, 2003 (Exhibition catalog)
- Willy Handrick: Johann Joseph Schmeller, Aufbau-Verlag, 1966.
- Carl Ruland (1890). "Schmeller, Johann Joseph" . Allgemeine Deutsche Biographie (in German). Vol. 31. Leipzig: Duncker & Humblot. pp. 636–637.
- Schmeller, Johann Joseph. In: Deutsche Biografie.
