= Joachim Brendel =

German World War II flying ace

- Joachim Brendel
- Born: 27 April 1921; Ulrichshalben, Germany
- Died: 7 July 1974 (aged 53); Cologne, West Germany
- Military career
- Allegiance: Nazi Germany
- Branch: Luftwaffe
- Service years: 1939–1945
- Rank: Hauptmann (captain)
- Unit: JG 51
- Commands: 1./JG 51, III./JG 51
- Conflicts: See battles World War II: Eastern Front; Operation Barbarossa; Battle of Kursk; Courland Pocket
- Awards: Knight's Cross of the Iron Cross with Oak Leaves

Joachim Brendel (27 April 1921 – 7 July 1974) was a Luftwaffe flying ace of World War II. Brendel was credited with 189 aerial victories—that is, 189 aerial combat encounters resulting in the destruction of the enemy aircraft. All but six of his victories were claimed over the Soviet Air Forces on the Eastern Front in more than 950 combat missions, including 162 ground support missions.

Born in Ulrichshalben, Brendel joined the military service in the Luftwaffe of Nazi Germany in 1939. Following flight training, he was posted to 2. Staffel (squadron) of Jagdgeschwader 51 (JG 51—51st Fighter Wing). He flew his first combat missions in Operation Barbarossa, the German invasion of the Soviet Union, and claimed his first aerial victory on 29 June 1941. There, after 101 aerial victories, he was presented with the Knight's Cross of the Iron Cross on 22 November 1943. In July 1944, he was appointed Gruppenkommandeur (group commander) of the III. Gruppe (3rd group) of JG 51 "Mölders". Following his 153rd aerial victory, Brendel was awarded the Knight's Cross of the Iron Cross with Oak Leaves on 14 January 1945. He continued flying operationally until the end of World War II. He died on 7 July 1974 in Cologne, West Germany.

== Early life and career ==
Brendel, the son of a police Hauptmann (captain), was born on 27 April 1921 in Ulrichshalben, present-day a borough of Ilmtal-Weinstraße, at the time in Thuringia of the Weimar Republic. After attending a Gymnasium, a secondary school, and graduating with his Abitur (diploma), he joined the military service of the Luftwaffe as a Fahnenjunker (cadet) on 15 November 1939. Following fighter pilot training, (Note: Flight training in the Luftwaffe progressed through the levels A1, A2 and B1, B2, referred to as A/B flight training. A training included theoretical and practical training in aerobatics, navigation, long-distance flights and dead-stick landings. The B courses included high-altitude flights, instrument flights, night landings, and training to handle the aircraft in difficult situations.) he was posted to 2. Staffel (squadron) of Jagdgeschwader 51 (JG 51—51st Fighter Wing) in early 1941.

== World War II ==
World War II in Europe had begun on Friday 1 September 1939 when German forces invaded Poland. JG 51, under the command of Oberst Werner Mölders, was preparing for Operation Barbarossa, the German invasion of the Soviet Union which was launched on 22 June 1941. On 29 June, Brendel claimed his first aerial victory. On 1 July, he was promoted to Leutnant (second lieutenant) and two days later he was awarded the Iron Cross 2nd Class (Eisernes Kreuz zweiter Klasse).

Brendel then flew a number of ground support missions, was awarded the Iron Cross 1st Class (Eisernes Kreuz erster Klasse) on 21 April 1942. On 8 December, he claimed his 10th victory on his 225th combat mission. He claimed his 20th victory on 24 February 1943 and received the Honor Goblet of the Luftwaffe (Ehrenpokal der Luftwaffe) on 15 March 1943. On 25 May, Brendel was appointed Staffelkapitän (squadron leader) of JG 51s 1. Staffel (1st squadron), replacing Oberleuntant (First Lieutenant) Hans Boos who had been killed in a mid-air collision on 21 April. His number of aerial victories claimed increased to 30 on 5 May, and on 17 May he was awarded the German Cross in Gold (Deutsches Kreuz in Gold). On 10 June, Brendel claimed his 40th opponent shot down and was promoted to Oberleuntant on 1 July.

On the first day of the Battle of Kursk, 5 July 1943, Brendel claimed two Ilyushin Il-2 ground-attack aircraft shot down on the northern flank of the attack. His wingman, Unteroffizier Oskar Romm was credited with the destruction of a third Il-2. The next day, Brendel led his 1. Staffel in an attack against 15 Douglas A-20 Havoc bombers from the 221 Bomber Aviation Division. Brendel claimed one bomber destroyed but the fighter escort from 282 Fighter Aviation Division successfully engaged the German fighters.

Brendel became an "ace-in-a-day" for the first time on 12 July 1943, claiming aerial victories 53 to 57. On 28 July, Brendel was shot down and wounded in his Focke-Wulf Fw 190 A-6 (Werknummer' 470002—factory number) by Soviet anti artillery behind enemy lines. He managed to return to German held territory. On 1 October 1943, he was promoted to Hauptman with a rank age dated to 1 April 1944. On 22 November, Brendel claimed six aircraft shot down on his 551st combat mission, taking his total to 101 aerial victories. For this achievement he was awarded the Knight's Cross of the Iron Cross (Ritterkreuz des Eisernen Kreuzes) that day. He was the 60th Luftwaffe pilot to achieve the century mark.

=== Group commander ===
On 29 July 1944, Brendel claimed a Yakovlev Yak-9 fighter shot down in the vicinity of Białystok. His opponent may have been Kapitan Vladimir Shchegolev from the 162nd Fighter Aviation Regiment, a fighter ace credited with 14 individual and three shared victories who was killed in action that day. On 1 September 1944, Brendel was appointed Gruppenkommandeur (group commander) of III. Gruppe of JG 51. He succeeded Hauptmann Diethelm von Eichel-Streiber in this function who was transferred. Command of 1. Staffel was briefly passed to Leutnant Gerhard Mai before Leutnant Kurt Dombacher was given command of the Staffel on 10 September.

Flying with III. Gruppe on 16 October 1944, Brendel achieved his 150th victory on his 792nd combat mission. Following his 153rd victory, he was awarded the Knight's Cross of the Iron Cross with Oak Leaves (Ritterkreuz des Eisernen Kreuzes mit Eichenlaub) on 14 January 1945, the 697th officer or soldier of the Wehrmacht so honored. He continued flying on the Eastern Front, claiming his 174th and 175th victory on 4 March 1945. End of March, he was ordered to Berlin where the presentation of the Oak Leaves was made at the Reichsluftfahrtministerium (RLM— Ministry of Aviation) in Berlin by Reichsmarschall Hermann Göring.

On 18 February 1945, III. Gruppe claimed six aerial victories during the battle of the Courland Pocket, including four by Brendel. Two days later, he claimed three further victories. He claimed his last victory on the 25 April 1945, finishing the war with 189 victories and emerged as JG 51 highest claiming fighter pilot on the Eastern Front, including over 90 heavily armored Ilyushin Il-2 ground-attack aircraft.

== Later life ==
He died on 7 July 1974 in Cologne, West Germany and was buried in Salzburg, Austria.

== Summary of career ==
=== Aerial victory claims ===
According to US historian David T. Zabecki, Brendel was credited with 189 aerial victories. Mathews and Foreman, authors of Luftwaffe Aces – Biographies and Victory Claims, researched the German Federal Archives and found records for 178 aerial victory claims, plus 13 further unconfirmed claims. This number includes one claim over a United States Army Air Forces flown B-17 Flying Fortress, and 177 Soviet Air Forces piloted aircraft on the Eastern Front.

Victory claims were logged to a map-reference (PQ = Planquadrat), for example "PQ 07813". The Luftwaffe grid map (Jägermeldenetz) covered all of Europe, western Russia and North Africa and was composed of rectangles measuring 15 minutes of latitude by 30 minutes of longitude, an area of about 360 square miles (930 km^{2}). These sectors were then subdivided into 36 smaller units to give a location area 3 km × 4 km (1.9 mi × 2.5 mi) in size.

Chronicle of aerial victories
This and the ♠ (Ace of spades) indicates those aerial victories which made Brendel an "ace-in-a-day", a term which designates a fighter pilot who has shot down five or more airplanes in a single day. This and the – (dash) indicates unconfirmed aerial victory claims for which Brendel did not receive credit. This and the ? (question mark) indicates information discrepancies listed by Prien, Stemmer, Rodeike, Balke, Bock, Mathews and Foreman.
Claim	Date	Time	Type	Location	Claim	Date	Time	Type	Location
– 12. Staffel of Jagdgeschwader 51 – Operation Barbarossa — 22 June – 5 December 1941
1	29 June 1941	18:20	DB-3						
– 2. Staffel of Jagdgeschwader 51 "Mölders" – Eastern Front — 6 December 1941 – 30 April 1942
2	31 March 1942	14:55	I-61 (MiG-3)		4	29 April 1942	18:55	MiG-3	Lake Dechino
3	5 April 1942	11:05	Il-2	Demyansk					
– 2. Staffel of Jagdgeschwader 51 "Mölders" – Eastern Front — 1 May 1942 – 3 February 1943
5	7 May 1942	10:35	Il-2	10 km (6.2 mi) west of Demyansk	12	6 January 1943	10:44	Pe-2	PQ 07813
6	3 July 1942? (Note: According to Mathews and Foreman claimed on 2 July 1942.)	13:28	Il-2		13	6 January 1943	10:57	Pe-2	PQ 07851
7	6 July 1942	19:25	MiG-3		14	6 January 1943	11:00	Pe-2	PQ 07822
8	9 July 1942	04:20	MiG-3		15	16 January 1943	08:16	MiG-3	PQ 17712, Velikiye Luki; 35 km (22 mi) west-southwest of Toropa
9	12 July 1942	09:00	MiG-3		16	18 January 1943	08:02	Pe-2	PQ 07743
10	8 December 1942	13:00	Il-2	PQ 26192, Bely	17	18 January 1943	08:05	Pe-2	PQ 07741
11	14 December 1942	10:42	MiG-3	southwest of Belyi	18	18 January 1943	08:09	Pe-2	PQ 06131
– 2. Staffel of Jagdgeschwader 51 "Mölders" – Eastern Front — 4 February 1943 – 31 December 1943
19	24 February 1943	09:12	Il-2	PQ 35 Ost 54122; 20 km (12 mi) south-southwest of Sukhinichi	28	21 March 1943	16:05	LaGG-3	PQ 35 Ost 53763 vicinity of Perwoawgustowskiy
20	24 February 1943	09:15	Il-2	PQ 35 Ost 54131; 20 km (12 mi) south of Sukhinichi	29	15 April 1943	09:28	Pe-2	PQ 35 Ost 64832; 10 km (6.2 mi) south of Mtsensk
21	7 March 1943	14:25	Il-2	PQ 35 Ost 36432; 25 km (16 mi) west-northwest of Dunigo	30	5 May 1943	07:00	R-5	PQ 35 Ost 62141; 20 km (12 mi) northwest of Kursk
22	9 March 1943	07:27	Il-2	PQ 35 Ost 63244; 10 km (6.2 mi) south of Zalegoshch	31	6 May 1943	13:30	Il-2	PQ 35 Ost 64754; 20 km (12 mi) northeast of Oryol
23	9 March 1943	07:32	Il-2	PQ 35 Ost 63433; 40 km (25 mi) east-southeast of Zmiyovka	32	7 May 1943	05:05	Il-2	PQ 35 Ost 63121; 10 km (6.2 mi) east of Oryol
24	18 March 1943	06:40	Il-2	PQ 35 Ost 53562; 20 km (12 mi) southeast of Dmitrovsk-Orlovsky	33	7 May 1943	05:15	Il-2	PQ 35 Ost 63181 vicinity of Zmiyovka
25	18 March 1943	06:42	Il-2	PQ 35 Ost 53543; 15 km (9.3 mi) south-southwest of Dmitrovsk-Orlovsky	34	8 May 1943	07:49	Il-2	PQ 35 Ost 63644; 5 km (3.1 mi) southeast of Maloarkhangelsk
26	18 March 1943	06:44	Il-2	PQ 35 Ost 53822; 20 km (12 mi) northeast of Dmitriyev-Lgovsky	35	11 May 1943	13:30	Il-2	PQ 35 Ost 53632 vicinity of Trosna
27	21 March 1943	06:23	La-5	PQ 35 Ost 45521; 10 km (6.2 mi) northeast of Utrikowo					
– 1. Staffel of Jagdgeschwader 51 "Mölders" – Eastern Front — 4 February 1943 – 31 December 1943
36	28 May 1943	11:24	La-5	PQ 35 Ost 63151; 15 km (9.3 mi) southeast of Oryol	68	25 July 1943	12:30	La-5	PQ 35 Ost 53427; 5 km (3.1 mi) west of Kromy
37	5 June 1943	09:35	Pe-2	PQ 35 Ost 44454; 25 km (16 mi) east-southeast of Dyatkovo	69	25 July 1943	12:33? (Note: According to Mathews and Foreman claimed at 12:32.)	Il-2 m.H. (Note: The "m.H." refers to an Ilyushin Il-2 with rear gunner (mit Heckschütze).)	PQ 35 Ost 53425; 5 km (3.1 mi) west of Kromy
38	8 June 1943	19:11	Il-2	PQ 35 Ost 54892; 15 km (9.3 mi) northwest of Oryol	70	28 July 1943	10:35? (Note: According to Mathews and Foreman claimed at 10:36.)	Il-2 m.H.	PQ 35 Ost 54657; 20 km (12 mi) west-southwest of Belyov
39	8 June 1943	19:12	Il-2	PQ 35 Ost 54864; 20 km (12 mi) north-northwest of Oryol	71	28 July 1943	10:37	Il-2 m.H.	PQ 35 Ost 54654; 20 km (12 mi) west-southwest of Belyov
40	10 June 1943	19:37	Yak-1	PQ 35 Ost 44472; 15 km (9.3 mi) southeast of Dyatkovo	72	28 July 1943	10:39	Il-2 m.H.	PQ 35 Ost 54643, southwest of Bolkhov; 20 km (12 mi) northeast of Znamenskoye
41	10 June 1943	19:49	Pe-2	PQ 35 Ost 45893; 25 km (16 mi) west-southwest of Sukhinichi	73	15 September 1943	08:00	LaGG-3	PQ 35 Ost 16697, southeast of Lake Akitovskoye
42	5 July 1943	08:52	Il-2	PQ 35 Ost 63694; 25 km (16 mi) east-southeast of Maloarkhangelsk	74	15 September 1943	17:05	Yak-9	PQ 35 Ost 25496, west of Yelnya
43	5 July 1943	08:54	Il-2	PQ 35 Ost 73571; 40 km (25 mi) west-southwest of Livny	75	17 September 1943	07:18	Yak-9	PQ 35 Ost 35374, Wilkowa
44	6 July 1943	05:39	Boston	PQ 35 Ost 53653; 20 km (12 mi) southwest of Trosna	76	17 September 1943	10:43	Pe-2	PQ 35 Ost 35318, Wjawka
45	6 July 1943	13:55	La-5	PQ 35 Ost 63553; 15 km (9.3 mi) west of Maloarkhangelsk	77	17 September 1943	13:48	Il-2 m.H.	PQ 35 Ost 25622, west of Chamino
46	7 July 1943	08:20	Boston	PQ 35 Ost 53593; 20 km (12 mi) south-southwest of Trosna	78	19 September 1943	15:42	Il-2 m.H.	PQ 35 Ost 25476, west of Schozokowo
47	8 July 1943	03:51	Il-2	PQ 35 Ost 63741; 10 km (6.2 mi) southeast of Fatez	79	20 September 1943	13:20	Il-2 m.H.	PQ 35 Ost 25619, Olchowskij; Yelnya
48	8 July 1943	03:58	Il-2	PQ 35 Ost 63573; 20 km (12 mi) south-southeast of Trosna	80	5 October 1943	15:10	La-5	PQ 35 Ost 15525, Lenino
49	9 July 1943	05:40	Il-2? (Note: According to Mathews and Foreman claimed as a Lavochkin-Gorbunov-Gudkov LaGG-3.)	PQ 35 Ost 63553; 15 km (9.3 mi) west of Maloarkhangelsk	81	6 October 1943	11:30	Il-2 m.H.	PQ 35 Ost 06172; 25 km (16 mi) south-southeast of Nevel
50	9 July 1943	05:41	LaGG-3? (Note: According to Mathews and Foreman claimed as an Ilyushin Il-2.)	PQ 35 Ost 63552; 15 km (9.3 mi) west of Maloarkhangelsk	82	6 October 1943	15:15	Il-2 m.H.	PQ 35 Ost 06149; 20 km (12 mi) south-southeast of Nevel
51	9 July 1943	05:44	Il-2	PQ 35 Ost 63523; 20 km (12 mi) west-northwest of Maloarkhangelsk	83	12 October 1943	11:20	Yak-9	PQ 35 Ost 05696, Gorki
52	11 July 1943	03:55	MiG-3	PQ 35 Ost 63581; 10 km (6.2 mi) southwest of Maloarkhangelsk	84	13 October 1943	08:55	Pe-2	PQ 35 Ost 15512, DajewoLajewo??
53♠	12 July 1943	05:46? (Note: According to Mathews and Foreman claimed at 05:45.)	Il-2 m.H.	PQ 35 Ost 63226; 10 km (6.2 mi) east of Zalegoshch	85	13 October 1943	13:00	Pe-2	PQ 35 Ost 15355, Litowka
54♠	12 July 1943	05:48	Il-2 m.H.	PQ 35 Ost 63231; 20 km (12 mi) east of Zalegoshch	86	20 October 1943	15:00	Yak-9	PQ 35 Ost 03877, Uborow
55♠	12 July 1943	05:54	Il-2 m.H.	PQ 35 Ost 64897; 25 km (16 mi) east-northeast of Zalegoshch	87	20 October 1943	15:15	Il-2 m.H.	PQ 35 Ost 03888, Prud
56♠	12 July 1943	19:40	Il-2 m.H.	PQ 35 Ost 54277; 25 km (16 mi) southwest of Kozelsk	88	21 October 1943	10:10	Yak-9	PQ 35 Ost 02251; 35 km (22 mi) northwest of Ossijaki
57♠	12 July 1943	19:46	Il-2 m.H.	PQ 35 Ost 54278; 25 km (16 mi) southwest of Kozelsk	89	21 October 1943	12:28	Il-2 m.H.	PQ 35 Ost 02211; 45 km (28 mi) south-southeast of Rechytsa
58	13 July 1943	09:30	Il-2 m.H.	PQ 35 Ost 63228; 10 km (6.2 mi) east of Zalegoshch	90	22 October 1943	13:43	Il-2 m.H.	PQ 35 Ost 02244, Kortschewka
59	13 July 1943	11:47? (Note: According to Mathews and Foreman claimed at 11:43.)	Il-2 m.H.	PQ 35 Ost 63264; 25 km (16 mi) east-southeast of Zalegoshch	91	25 October 1943	11:15	Yak-9	PQ 35 Ost 03872; 40 km (25 mi) south-southeast of Rechytsa
60	14 July 1943	14:37	Il-2 m.H.	PQ 35 Ost 54172; 20 km (12 mi) east-northeast of Zhizdra	92	6 November 1943	07:30	Yak-9	PQ 35 Ost 01391, northwest of Kiev
61	17 July 1943	10:23	Il-2 m.H.	PQ 35 Ost 53636 vicinity of Trosna	93	6 November 1943	14:35	Il-2 m.H.	PQ 35 Ost 01743, Malowilowka
62	17 July 1943	19:05? (Note: According to Mathews and Foreman claimed at 19:08.)	MiG-3	PQ 35 Ost 54632; 10 km (6.2 mi) west of Bolkhov	94	11 November 1943	09:40	Il-2	northeast of Bila Tserkva
63	19 July 1943	12:03	Yak-1	PQ 35 Ost 64814; 10 km (6.2 mi) south of Mtsensk	95♠	22 November 1943	09:05	Il-2 m.H.	PQ 35 Ost 03493; 10 km (6.2 mi) north of Gomel
? (Note: This claim is listed by Mathews and Foreman as his 64th aerial victory, but not by Prien, Stemmer, Rodeike and Bock.)	19 July 1943	12:30	LaGG-3		96♠	22 November 1943	09:07	Il-2 m.H.	PQ 35 Ost 13371; 10 km (6.2 mi) northeast of Gomel
64	20 July 1943	09:20	Yak-1	PQ 35 Ost 64875; 10 km (6.2 mi) north of Zalegoshch	97♠	22 November 1943	12:05	Yak-9	PQ 35 Ost 13577, southwest of Klimovka
65	21 July 1943	18:15	La-5	PQ 35 Ost 64811; 10 km (6.2 mi) south of Mtsensk	98♠	22 November 1943	12:25	Il-2 m.H.	PQ 35 Ost 03496, northeast of Kostyukovka
66	22 July 1943	13:02	LaGG-3	PQ 35 Ost 63133; 10 km (6.2 mi) west of Zalegoshch	99♠	22 November 1943	12:27	Il-2 m.H.	PQ 35 Ost 03436, Logatino
67	22 July 1943	13:10	Il-2 m.H.	PQ 35 Ost 63135; 10 km (6.2 mi) west of Zalegoshch	100♠	22 November 1943	12:30	Il-2 m.H.	PQ 35 Ost 13377; 10 km (6.2 mi) northeast of Gomel
– 1. Staffel of Jagdgeschwader 51 "Mölders" – Eastern Front — 1 January – 31 August 1944
101	10 January 1944	14:30	Yak-9	PQ 35 Ost N/06749; 25 km (16 mi) southwest of Liozna	115	7 August 1944	08:30	Yak-9	PQ 25 Ost N/22312; 20 km (12 mi) northeast of Dęblin
102	12 January 1944	09:58	Yak-9	PQ 25 Ost N/96831; 10 km (6.2 mi) northwest of Kamary	116	14 August 1944	17:22	Il-2 m.H.	PQ 25 Ost N/12328; 15 km (9.3 mi) southeast of Garwolin
103	12 January 1944	10:35	LaGG-3	PQ 35 Ost N/05126; 20 km (12 mi) south-southeast of Kamary	117	16 August 1944	08:36	Il-2 m.H.	PQ 25 Ost N/24765; 20 km (12 mi) east-southeast of Lomza
104	12 January 1944	10:36	Yak-9	PQ 35 Ost N/06788; 15 km (9.3 mi) southeast of Kamary	118	16 August 1944	14:20	La-5	PQ 25 Ost N/24791; 25 km (16 mi) southeast of Lomza
105	12 January 1944	13:50	Il-2 m.H.	PQ 35 Ost N/05162; 20 km (12 mi) east-southeast of Kamary	119	18 August 1944	16:40	Il-2 m.H.	PQ 25 Ost N/13392; 40 km (25 mi) northeast of Warsaw
106	5 February 1944	14:28	Pe-2	PQ 25 Ost N/93337; 10 km (6.2 mi) south of Parichi	120	20 August 1944	12:42	Il-2 m.H.	PQ 25 Ost N/13523, northeast of Warsaw; 15 km (9.3 mi) north of Gerdauen
107	8 April 1944	09:38	Yak-9	PQ 25 Ost N/42676; 15 km (9.3 mi) northwest of Kovel	121	21 August 1944	16:22	Yak-9	PQ 25 Ost N/13522, northeast of Warsaw; 25 km (16 mi) north-northeast of Warsaw
108	30 April 1944	13:47? (Note: According to Mathews and Foreman claimed at 13:48.)	Il-2	PQ 25 Ost N/42871; 20 km (12 mi) south-southwest of Kovel	122	22 August 1944	08:25	Il-2	PQ 25 Ost N/23128; 25 km (16 mi) northeast of Ostrov
109	23 June 1944	10:30	La-5	PQ 35 Ost N/05421; 30 km (19 mi) north-northeast of Orsha	123	22 August 1944	08:42	Yak-9? (Note: According to Mathews and Foreman claimed as a Ilyushin Il-2.)	PQ 25 Ost N/23129; 25 km (16 mi) northeast of Ostrov
— (Note: According to Mathews and Foreman, this claim was confirmed and is listed as his 111th aerial victory.)	24 June 1944	10:36	Il-2 m.H.	PQ 35 Ost N/05427; 15 km (9.3 mi) south-southeast of Byerazino	124	24 August 1944	11:45	Il-2 m.H.	PQ 25 Ost N/24745; 10 km (6.2 mi) south of Lomza
110	24 June 1944	10:50	Yak-9	PQ 35 Ost N/05382; 30 km (19 mi) north-northeast of Orsha	125	24 August 1944	14:37	Il-2 m.H.	PQ 25 Ost N/13264; 10 km (6.2 mi) north of Ostrov
111	30 June 1944	17:50? (Note: According to Mathews and Foreman claimed at 17:08.)	La-5	PQ 25 Ost N/94313; 25 km (16 mi) north-northwest of Orsha	126	25 August 1944	06:57	Yak-7	PQ 25 Ost N/13529, northeast of Warsaw; 25 km (16 mi) north-northeast of Warsaw
112	9 July 1944	07:15? (Note: According to Mathews and Foreman claimed at 07:05.)	Yak-9	PQ 25 Ost N/54744; 20 km (12 mi) north of Oryol	127	25 August 1944	07:14	Il-2 m.H.	PQ 25 Ost N/13521, northeast of Warsaw; 25 km (16 mi) north-northeast of Warsaw
113	19 July 1944	17:50	Il-2 m.H.	PQ 25 Ost N/32816; 15 km (9.3 mi) northeast of Cholm	128	26 August 1944? (Note: According to Mathews and Foreman claimed on 28 August 1944 as a Lavochkin La-5.)	08:45	LaGG-3?	PQ 25 Ost N/13254; 10 km (6.2 mi) north of Ostrov
114	29 July 1944	10:05	Yak-9	PQ 25 Ost N/34746 vicinity of Białystok	129? (Note: This claim is not listed by Mathews and Foreman.)	28 August 1944	14:11	Yak-9	PQ 25 Ost N/13245
– Stab III. Gruppe of Jagdgeschwader 51 –
130	16 September 1944	16:55	Pe-2	PQ 25 Ost 27516; 55 km (34 mi) north-northwest of Telsche		14 January 1945	—	unknown	
131	16 September 1944	16:58	Pe-2	PQ 25 Ost 27556; 45 km (28 mi) north of Telsche		18 February 1945	—	unknown	vicinity of Heiligenbeil
132	17 September 1944	15:56	Yak-9	PQ 25 Ost 27556; 25 km (16 mi) west-southwest of Mitau		18 February 1945	—	unknown	vicinity of Heiligenbeil
133	17 September 1944	16:12	Il-2	PQ 25 Ost 27556; 35 km (22 mi) west-southwest of Mitau		18 February 1945	—	unknown	vicinity of Heiligenbeil
134	22 September 1944	10:27	Boston	PQ 25 Ost 27491; 50 km (31 mi) south-southwest of Tukkum		18 February 1945	—	unknown	vicinity of Heiligenbeil
135	24 September 1944	08:29	Pe-2	PQ 25 Ost 37362		19 February 1945	—	unknown	
136	5 October 1944	15:27	Il-2 m.H.	PQ 25 Ost 27883; 30 km (19 mi) east-northeast of Telsche		19 February 1945	—	unknown	
137	5 October 1944	15:30	Il-2 m.H.	PQ 25 Ost 27739; 25 km (16 mi) north-northeast of Telsche		20 February 1945	—	unknown	
138	6 October 1944	11:44	Il-2 m.H.	PQ 25 Ost 36345; 25 km (16 mi) north-northeast of Nemakščiai		20 February 1945	—	unknown	
139	6 October 1944	11:58	Il-2 m.H.	PQ 25 Ost 36377; 20 km (12 mi) northeast of Nemakščiai		20 February 1945	—	unknown	
140	9 October 1944	14:38	Il-2 m.H.	PQ 25 Ost 26725 vicinity of Tauroggen		21 February 1945	—	Il-2	
141	13 October 1944	15:34	Il-2 m.H.	PQ 25 Ost 25267; 10 km (6.2 mi) north of Trakehnen		21 February 1945	—	Il-2	
142♠	14 October 1944	12:05	Il-2 m.H.	PQ 25 Ost 25228; 25 km (16 mi) northeast of Blumenfeld		21 February 1945	—	Il-2	
143♠	14 October 1944	14:45	Il-2 m.H.	PQ 25 Ost 16173; 30 km (19 mi) east of Neusiedel		21 February 1945	—	P-39	
144♠	14 October 1944	14:46	Il-2 m.H.	PQ 25 Ost 16157; 15 km (9.3 mi) north of Memel		23 February 1945	—	unknown	
145♠	14 October 1944	14:47	Il-2 m.H.	PQ 25 Ost 16155; 10 km (6.2 mi) southeast of Polangen	174	4 March 1945	—	Il-2	
146♠	14 October 1944	15:05	Il-2 m.H.	PQ 25 Ost 16326; 10 km (6.2 mi) southeast of Polangen	175	4 March 1945	—	Il-2	
147	16 October 1944	09:59	Il-2 m.H.	PQ 25 Ost 25256; 10 km (6.2 mi) east of Memel	176	8 March 1945	14:32	Pe-2	
148	16 October 1944	10:02	Yak-9	PQ 25 Ost 25261; 20 km (12 mi) northeast of Blumenfeld	177	9 March 1945	12:00+	unknown	
149	18 October 1944	09:46	Yak-9	PQ 25 Ost 25484; 25 km (16 mi) northeast of Blumenfeld	178	9 March 1945	12:00+	unknown	
150	20 October 1944	10:06	Il-2 m.H.	PQ 25 Ost 25243; 15 km (9.3 mi) east-southeast of Gumbinnen		18 March 1945	—	unknown	
151	22 October 1944	12:36	Yak-3	PQ 25 Ost 25367; 20 km (12 mi) east of Trakehnen		18 March 1945	—	unknown	
152	24 October 1944	12:45	Il-2 m.H.	PQ 25 Ost 25511; 20 km (12 mi) east of Rautenberg		18 March 1945	—	unknown	
153	14 December 1944	12:18	Yak-3	15 km (9.3 mi) north of Gumbinnen	189	25 April 1945	—	Yak-9	

=== Awards ===
- Iron Cross (1939)
  - 2nd Class (3 July 1941)
  - 1st Class (21 April 1942)
- Honour Goblet of the Luftwaffe on 15 March 1943 as Leutnant and pilot
- German Cross in Gold on 17 May 1943 as Leutnant in the 2./Jagdgeschwader 51
- Knight's Cross of the Iron Cross with Oak Leaves
  - Knight's Cross on 22 November 1943 as Oberleutnant and Staffelkapitän of the 1./Jagdgeschwader 51 "Mölders"
  - 697th Oak Leaves on 14 January 1945 as Hauptmann and Gruppenkommandeur of the III./Jagdgeschwader 51 "Mölders"
