= Hottelstedt =

- Village of Am Ettersberg
- Interactive map of Hottelstedt
- Location within Germany Location within Thuringia
- Coordinates: 51°2′14″N 11°13′43″E
- Country: Germany
- State: Thuringia
- District: Weimarer Land
- Town: Am Ettersberg

Area
  - Total: 5.55 km^{2} (2.14 sq mi)
- Elevation: 320 m (1,050 ft)

Population (2006-12-31)
  - Total: 212
  - Density: 38.2/km^{2} (98.9/sq mi)
- Time zone: UTC+01:00 (CET)
  - Summer (DST): UTC+02:00 (CEST)
- Postal codes: 99439
- Dialling codes: 036452
- Vehicle registration: AP

Hottelstedt (German pronunciation: [ˈhɔtl̩ʃtɛt]) is a former municipality in the Weimarer Land district of Thuringia, Germany. Since 1 December 2007, it has been part of the municipality Berlstedt, which merged into the town Am Ettersberg on 1 January 2019.
