= Sachsenhausen (disambiguation) =

Sachsenhausen concentration camp was a detention and extermination facility (1936–1945) in Oranienburg, Germany.

Sachsenhausen may also refer to:

- Sachsenhausen (Frankfurt am Main), a city district of Frankfurt am Main, Hesse
- Sachsenhausen (Oranienburg), a city district of Oranienburg, Brandenburg
- Sachsenhausen (Thuringia), a municipality in the Weimarer Land, Thuringia
- Sachsenhausen (Waldeck), a city district of Waldeck, Hesse
