= Pitcairnia caulescens =

Scientific classification
- Kingdom: Plantae
- Clade: Embryophytes
- Clade: Tracheophytes
- Clade: Spermatophytes
- Clade: Angiosperms
- Clade: Monocots
- Clade: Commelinids
- Order: Poales
- Family: Bromeliaceae
- Genus: Pitcairnia
- Species: P. caulescens

Binomial name
- Pitcairnia caulescens (K.Koch ex Mez) Mez

Synonyms
- Homotypic Synonyms: Hepetis caulescens K.Koch ex Mez

Species of flowering plant

Pitcairnia caulescens is a species of flowering plant in the family Bromeliaceae. This species is native to Venezuela.
