= Ken Roczen =

German motorcycle racer (born 1994)

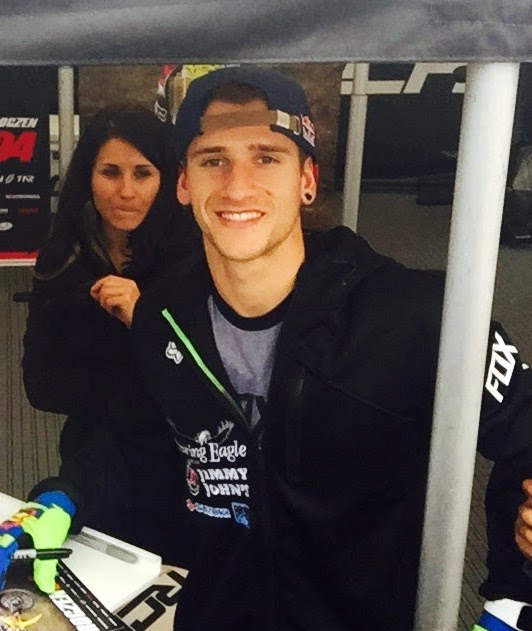
- Roczen at Supercross Oakland 2016
- Nationality: (Germany) German
- Born: 29 April 1994 (age 32) Mattstedt, Germany

Motocross career
- Years active: 2009–present
- Teams: •Teka Suzuki Europe World MX2 (2009–2010); •Red Bull Factory KTM (2010–2014); •RCH Suzuki (2014–2016); •HRC Honda (2016–2022); •HEP Suzuki (2022–present)
- Championships: •MX2 – 2011; •2013 AMA Supercross 250cc West; •2014 AMA 450cc Motocross; •2016 AMA 450cc Motocross; •2022 FIM WSX World Supercross; •2023 FIM WSX World Supercross; •2026 AMA Supercross 450cc
- Wins: •MX2: 12; •AMA Supercross 250cc: 6; •AMA Motocross 250cc: 2; •AMA Supercross 450cc: 28; •AMA Motocross 450cc: 21; AMA Total: 57

Ken Roczen (born 29 April 1994) is a German-American professional motocross and supercross racer. He competed in the Motocross World Championships from 2009 to 2011 and the AMA Supercross Championships since 2011. He is the 2011 MX2 World Champion, a two-time 450cc AMA Motocross Champion, the 2013 AMA Supercross 250cc West Champion, a two-time FIM World Supercross WSX Champion & the 2026 AMA Supercross 450cc Champion.

Roczen was also a member of the winning German team at the 2012 Motocross des Nations.

== Professional career ==
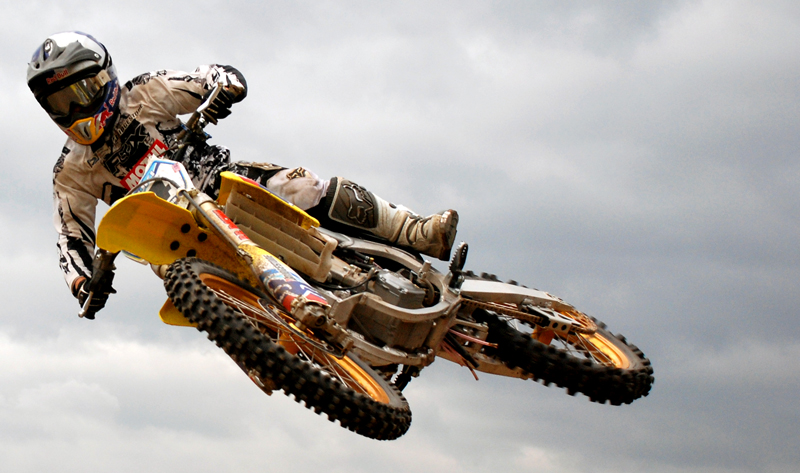
Ken Roczen performing a motocross jump

=== 2013 ===
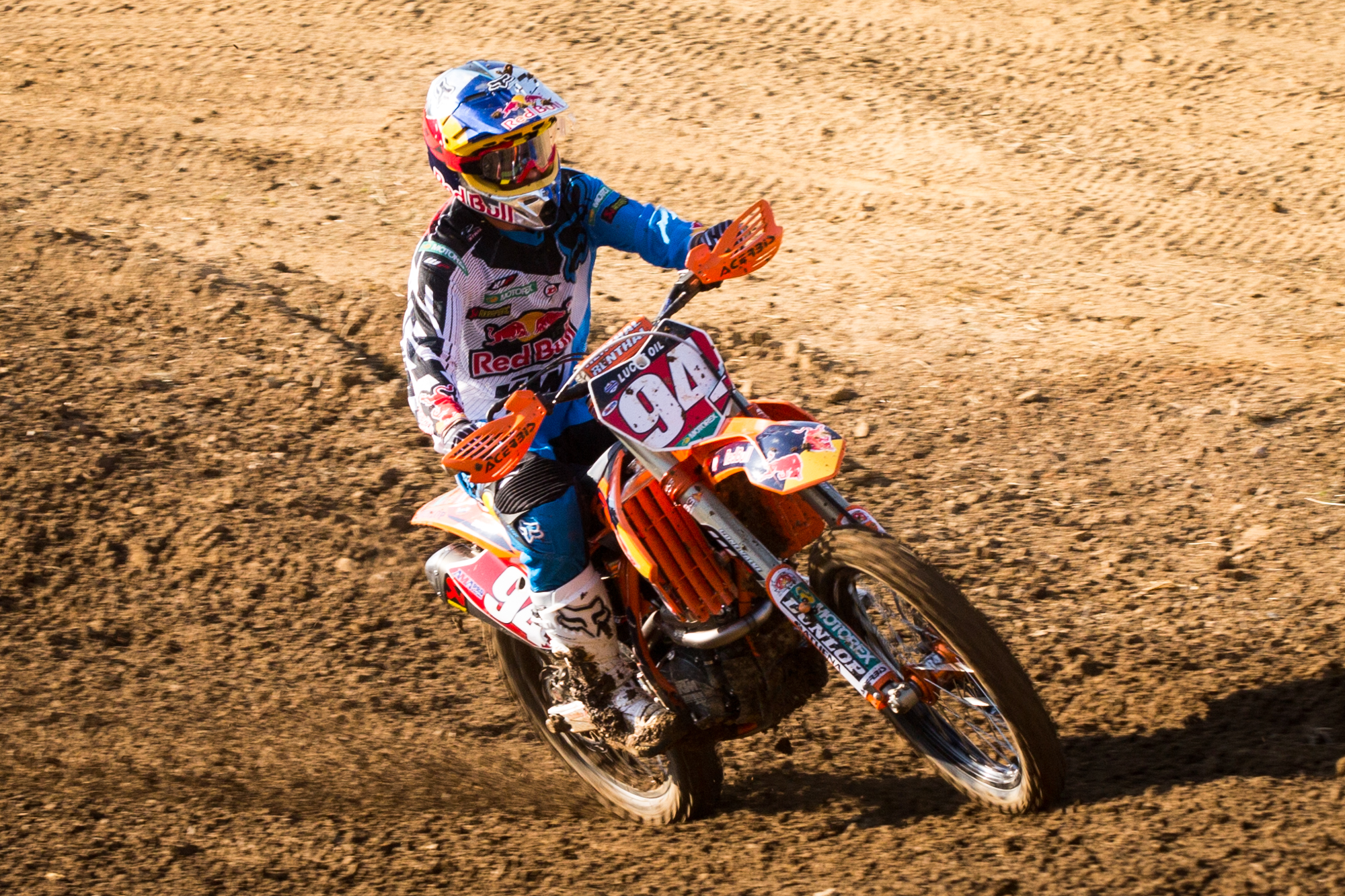
Roczen in 2013 at the Muddy Creek National.

In 2013, Roczen won the Supercross 250 West Championship, ending the season 2 points ahead of Eli Tomac.

=== 2014 ===
In 2014, he moved up to the 450cc class, joining Red Bull KTM Racing. Ken shocked fans worldwide when he started off his rookie season with a win in his first-ever 450 Supercross race at Anaheim I, the season opener. He would also go on to win at round 5 in Atlanta's Georgia Dome. Roczen finished the series third in the points standings after the final race at Las Vegas. By finishing third overall in the Supercross points chase his first year on the 450, he showed that he was primed to become one of the sports top competitors. Roczen would cement his new position atop the 450 Motocross world by going on to win the 2014 AMA Motocross Championship his rookie year, defeating Ryan Dungey.

=== 2015 ===
In 2015, Roczen signed with RCH Suzuki. He failed to repeat as Pro Motocross champion for 2015, surrendering his #1 plate to Ryan Dungey. He would go on to win the 450-class Monster Energy cup.

=== 2016 ===
In 2016, the German was runner-up in the AMA Supercross Championship points standings with five wins. He would go on to win the AMA Motocross title for the second time in dominating fashion with nine wins.

=== 2017 ===
In 2017, Roczen joined the Honda factory racing HRC Honda Racing Corporation team. After just winning his second Motocross championship, he was favored to win the AMA Supercross Championship after finishing second in 2016. Roczen would go on to win the first two races of the 2017 season. Then on 21 Jan 2017, while running in third place, Roczen's foot slipped off of the footpeg while going over a triple and he was ejected from the bike in mid-air crashing hard and receiving a compound fracture to his left arm, after landing face-first in a rhythm section of the track. Roczen would go on to miss the rest of the 2017 Supercross season and the following Motocross championship, as he had sustained serious injuries to his left arm including a compound fracture and compartment syndrome.

=== 2018 ===
In 2018, with his injury woes a year behind him, Roczen started the AMA Supercross Championship season in shape and ready to start his rise back to the top of the sport. He made it through much of the year, building on his progress each week and looking like he was rounding into form. Unfortunately on 10 February 2018, in San Diego, Roczen suffered another serious crash while attempting to pass Cooper Webb. As he entered a turn to set up a pass on Cooper with his back wheel spinning, he suddenly hooked a rut catching too much traction while also simultaneously impacting Cooper Webb's bike which caused him to fall off the back of the bike with his arm ending up being pulled into Cooper Webb's rear wheel and then shot back out. He underwent surgery to repair the shattered bones, dislocation of the metacarpals, and torn ligaments in his right hand. Roczen was out again for the rest of the Supercross season due to another serious injury. Luckily, this gave Roczen more time to allow his left arm to heal which was still damaged from the previous years crash. Roczen was able to heal just in time for the 2018 Motocross Championship in which he finished third.

=== 2019 ===
In 2019, Roczen finished fourth in the Supercross Championship with four podiums (no wins). In the Motocross Championship, he won the opener in Hangtown and two more rounds, a total of seven podiums of the 12 rounds, finishing second in the final point standings. He attended Red Bull Straight Rhythm, taking away a victory in the 250cc class despite it being his first time racing a two-stroke in his pro career.

=== 2020 ===
In 2020, on 11 January, Ken Roczen won his first AMA Supercross race in three years with a win at St.Louis. He won two more rounds until the season was COVID-19 interrupted after round 10 in Daytona, 7 March, and was at this point trailing leader Eli Tomac by three points. The season resumed with seven rounds all in Salt Lake City, UT, between 31 May and 21 June racing Sundays and Wednesdays in Rice-Eccles Stadium without spectators. Of the seven rounds, Ken collected one more win but fell to 3rd in the final standings.

=== 2021 ===
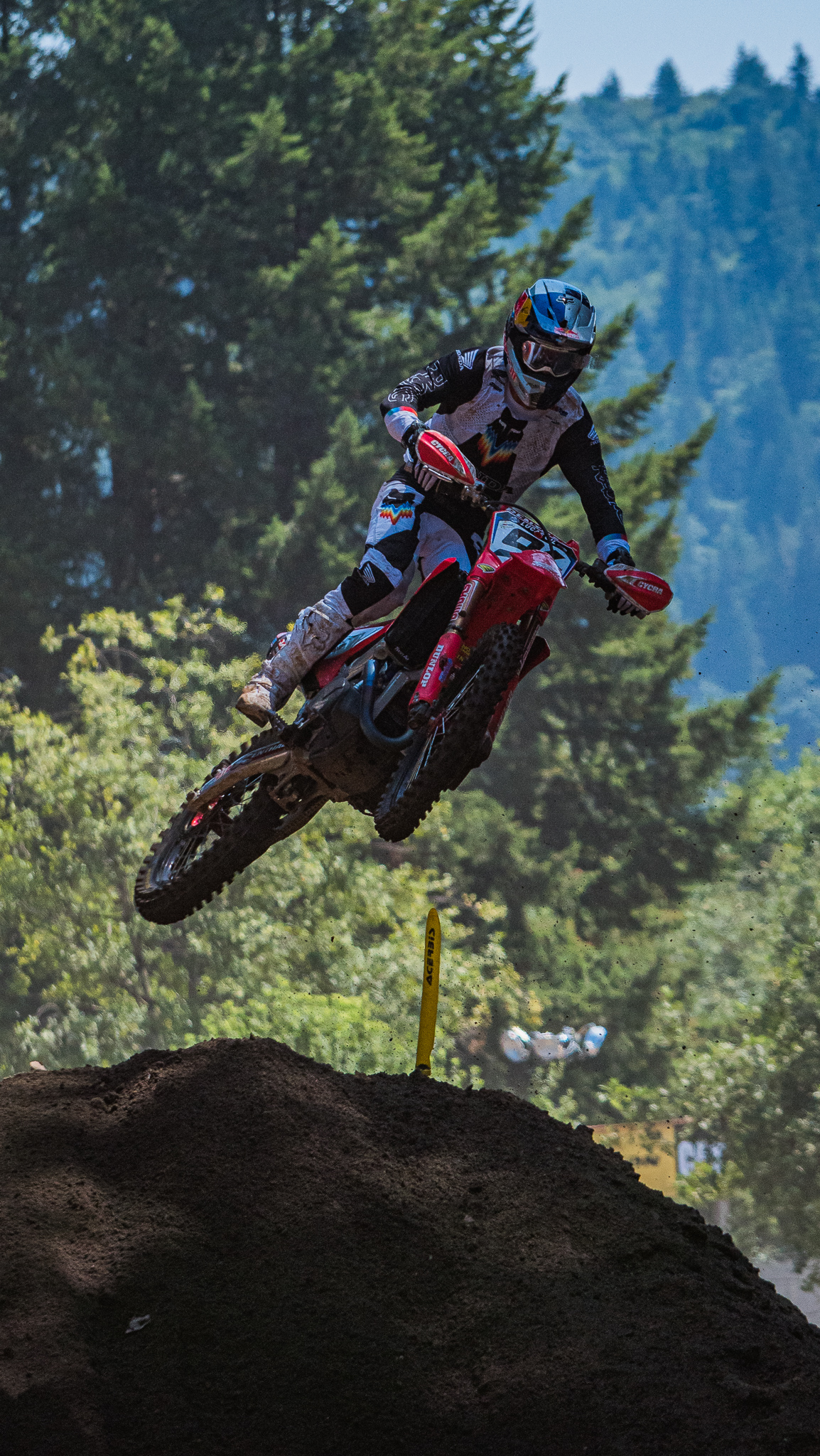
Roczen in 2021 at the Washougal National.

Supercross

2021 saw Roczen battle for the Supercross championship yet again. He managed four wins but was a distant second in the final point standings.

Motocross

Roczen finished third in Motocross with two overall wins.

=== 2022 ===
Roczen won the season opener at Anaheim. After a string of poor results, He decided not to race for the remainder of the AMA Supercross season due to mental and physical health reasons after a difficult start to the year.

Roczen returned for Motocross, where he won one race overall at round 3, Thunder Valley.

Roczen also raced the new World Supercross Championship, which he would win for Honda.

=== 2023 ===
Supercross

Roczen returned to Suzuki for the 2023 AMA Supercross season. His first win for the HEP Suzuki team would arrive at round 9, Indianapolis. In supercross he finished fourth after a DNF in Round 17 tied him on points with Cooper Webb.

World Supercross

On 8 May, it was announced that Roczen would race in the World Supercross Championship for the next three years. He began WSX by winning the British Grand Prix. Roczen successfully defended his SX1 WSX Title, winning the final round in Australia.

Motocross

Roczen appeared for one race of the 2023 AMA Pro Motocross series, the High Point MX National, where he qualified fastest overall ahead of eventual champion Jett Lawerence. He would go on to finish second overall on the day.

SMX World Championship

In the first edition of the SuperMotocross playoffs, Roczen would finish second overall at all three races, earning him runner-up in the championship.

=== 2024 ===
Supercross

Continuing aboard his HEP Suzuki, Roczen would achieve the podium six times in 2024 AMA Supercross, including a win at State Farm Stadium in Glendale, Arizona. This hard-packed, slick track bared a stark contrast to the track conditions of his win in Indianapolis the previous year, where the track was deep and rutted. Roczen's season would end prematurely when his bike suffered a catastrophic shock failure in the whoops section at the Nashville supercross, ejecting him from the bike and causing a broken tibia plateau, foot, and toe.

Motocross

Roczen raced two AMA Pro Motocross rounds in 2024, at Unadilla where he placed 7th overall, and at Ironman where he dropped down to the 250 class for his first race in the small bike class in over ten years. He would finish ninth overall after battling in the top-five in Moto 1.

=== 2025 ===
Roczen began the season strongly in the AMA Supercross Championship, finishing second at the opening round in Anaheim and recording several podium finishes in the early rounds of the season. A major highlight of Roczen's season came at the Daytona Supercross, where he won the main event aboard his Suzuki RM-Z450. Throughout the championship, Roczen remained among the top riders in the standings with additional podium finishes in Detroit and Arlington. Roczen finished the championship fifth overall with 271 points in the 450SX standings.

Following the completion of the AMA Motocross Championship, Roczen returned for the SuperMotocross World Championship playoffs. He finished fourth overall in the SMX standings, scoring consistent finishes across the three-round playoff series.

Later in the year, Roczen competed in the FIM World Supercross Championship. Of the three rounds he raced, he won the opening round in Buenos Aires, placed second in Vancouver, and first again on the Gold Coast, with dominant performances and multiple race victories during the event.

=== 2026 ===
13 years and 28 main event wins later, Roczen at the age of 32, secured his first 450 Supercross Championship. Roczen became the first European rider to win the title in 35 years and the first German born. He gave Suzuki their first championship since 2010, and doing so at 32, made him the oldest supercross champion in the sports history. Roczen overcame a 31 point deficit to edge rival Hunter Lawrence by 3 points after the finale. He ended the season on 349 points, 5 main event victories & 12 podiums.

== Motocross of Nations participation ==
=== 2009 ===
At the 2009 Motocross of Nations which was held at Franciacorta, Italy, Roczen represented Team Germany in the MX2 class. At just 15 years old, Roczen showcased exceptional talent and determination on the international stage. Competing against seasoned riders, he contributed significantly to Team Germany's fourth place finish with scores of 10–8 for second in the MX2 classification.

=== 2010 ===
The 63rd version of the Motocross Des nations was held on 26 September 2010 at Thunder Valley in Morrison, Colorado. Roczen resumed the MX2 role, placed sixth in race one and third in race two. A score of 9 granted him his first MX2 classification overall as well as a third place finish for team Germany.

=== 2011 ===
The 2011 Motocross of nations in Saint-Jean-d'Angély, France, was Roczens' third consecutive appearance. Roczen was yet again the class of the field in MX2 and secured another overall classification. Germany finished seventh.

=== 2012 ===
The 2012 Motocross of Nations was held in Lommel, Belgium. Roczen along with Max Nagl & Marcus Schiffer, led Team Germany to their first win at this event. He placed fifth in moto one and fourth in moto two, once again granting him the MX2 overall. Their victory marked the first German win in the history of the Motocross des Nations.

=== 2013 ===
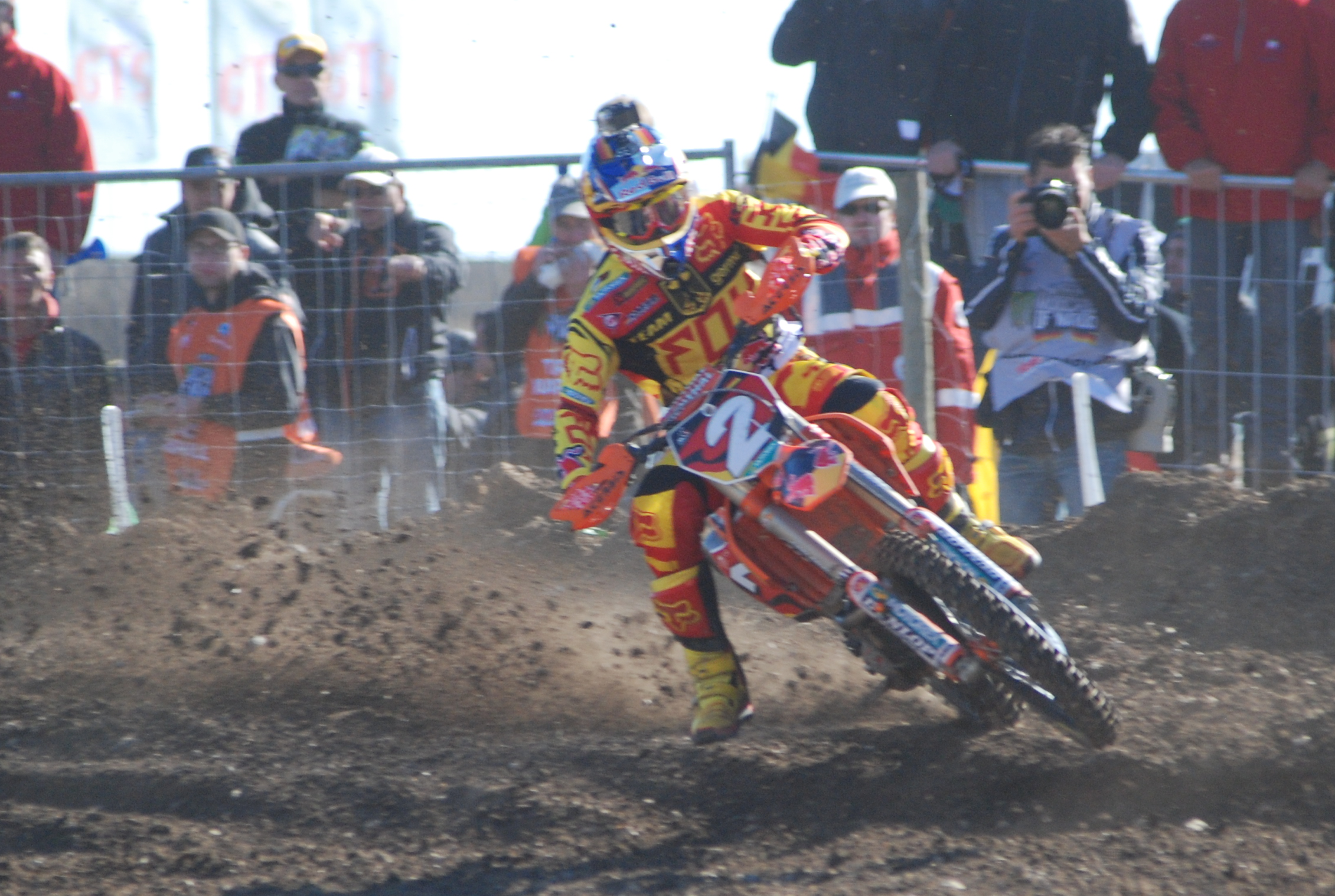
Roczen at the 2013 Motocross Des Nations

Coming in as the defending champions, Roczen represented team Germany on home soil in Teutschenthal, Germany. He once again raced in the MX2 class. He finished second in race one and first in race two which granted him the MX2 overall classification for the fourth year in a row. Team Germany finished seventh.

=== 2018 ===
Roczen returned to Des nations for the first time since 2013. The event was held at Red Bud MX in Buchanan, MI. He placed 25th in race one and ninth in race three. This placed him fifth in the MXGP classification and team Germany ninth overall with 70 points.

=== 2023 ===
The 2023 edition of the Motocross Des Nations was held in Ernee, France. This was Roczen's first Des Nations since 2018 and his first European one since 2013. Roczen finished third in moto one and second in moto two. With these scores, he would win the MXGP class overall classification as well as a fourth place finish for team Germany.

=== 2024 ===
The 2024 edition of the Motocross Des Nations was held at the Matterley Basin race track in Winchester, England. Roczen was selected to race the MXGP class and finished sixth in the Saturday qualifier. Race 1 saw Roczen battle for podium positions early in the race however eventually falling back to tenth place. Roczen would place tenth in the final race for 8th overall in the MXGP classification as well as team Germany finishing sixth.

=== 2025 ===
Roczen represented Germany at the 2025 Motocross of Nations, held at Ironman Raceway in Crawfordsville, Indiana. He competed in the MXGP class alongside teammates Simon Längenfelder (MX2) and Tom Koch (Open).

During the qualifying races, Roczen delivered a strong performance, helping Germany secure a favourable gate pick for Sunday's races.

In the main races, Roczen crashed on the opening lap in both, but remounted to score solid finishes in both motos, contributing valuable points to the German team. Germany ultimately finished inside the top-ten in the overall classification.

== MX2 Results ==
Year	Rnd 1	Rnd 2	Rnd 3	Rnd 4	Rnd 5	Rnd 6	Rnd 7	Rnd 8	Rnd 9	Rnd 10	Rnd 11	Rnd 12	Rnd 13	Rnd 14	Rnd 15	Average Finish	Podium Percent	Place
2009 MX2	OUT	OUT	OUT	OUT	7	4	9	5	1	4	2	5	4	3	2	4.18	36%	5th
2010 MX2	2	2	2	3	10	4	12	2	2	8	1	2	1	7	1	3.93	67%	2nd
2011 MX2	1	2	1	2	5	8	1	1	1	1	2	1	1	2	11	2.66	80%	1st

== AMA Supercross/Motocross results ==
Year	Rnd 1	Rnd 2	Rnd 3	Rnd 4	Rnd 5	Rnd 6	Rnd 7	Rnd 8	Rnd 9	Rnd 10	Rnd 11	Rnd 12	Rnd 13	Rnd 14	Rnd 15	Rnd 16	Rnd 17	Average Finish	Podium Percent	Place
~2011 250 SX-W	7	19	6	8	3	—	7	—	—	—	—	—	—	—	DNS	2	1	6.12	37%	6th
2012 250 SX-E	—	—	—	—	—	—	3	6	2	4	16	2	1	5	—	—	2	4.56	56%	2nd
2012 250 MX	3	3	3	3	2	5	4	5	3	3	2	6	—	—	—	—	—	3.33	67%	4th
2013 250 SX-W	2	2	2	1	1	2	—	—	—	—	—	—	—	—	1	DNS	2	1.63	100%	1st
2013 250 MX	1	2	3	2	4	2	1	2	9	3	3	2	—	—	—	—	—	2.83	83%	2nd
2014 450 SX	1	6	3	6	2	3	6	1	21	2	20	5	4	3	6	5	3	5.70	47%	3rd
2014 450 MX	2	1	1	2	2	1	1	2	3	3	4	1	—	—	—	—	—	1.92	92%	1st
2015 450 SX	1	2	1	15	4	2	2	18	8	DNS	DNS	DNS	DNS	DNS	DNS	DNS	DNS	5.44	55%	12th
2015 450 MX	12	4	2	2	1	4	3	4	4	5	2	2	—	—	—	—	—	3.75	50%	2nd
2016 450 SX	5	6	3	2	1	3	1	6	5	1	6	2	2	2	1	1	20	3.94	65%	2nd
2016 450 MX	1	2	1	1	1	1	2	1	2	1	1	1	—	—	—	—	—	1.25	100%	1st
2017 450 SX	1	1	DNF	DNS	DNS	DNS	DNS	DNS	DNS	DNS	DNS	DNS	DNS	DNS	DNS	DNS	DNS	1.00	100%	20th
2017 450 MX	DNS	DNS	DNS	DNS	DNS	DNS	DNS	DNS	DNS	DNS	DNS	DNS	—	—	—	—	—	—	—	—
2018 450 SX	4	2	9	3	2	21	DNS	DNS	DNS	DNS	DNS	DNS	DNS	DNS	DNS	DNS	DNS	6.83	50%	18th
2018 450 MX	11	5	2	4	4	5	2	2	2	7	2	2	—	—	—	—	—	4.00	50%	3rd
2019 450 SX	2	3	4	5	3	2	2	4	4	8	8	3	10	8	7	6	4	4.88	35%	4th
2019 450 MX	1	3	1	2	6	9	5	5	2	1	4	2	—	—	—	—	—	3.42	58%	2nd
2020 450 SX	6	1	2	1	3	6	3	2	1	2	3	5	10	5	1	4	7	3.71	59%	3rd
2020 450 MX	DNS	DNS	DNS	DNS	DNS	DNS	DNS	DNS	DNS	DNS	DNS	DNS	—	—	—	—	—	—	—	—
2021 450 SX	2	5	2	1	1	1	2	4	4	6	3	2	9	1	2	6	10	3.58	59%	2nd
2021 450 MX	2	1	4	4	2	8	9	1	2	4	4	9	—	—	—	—	—	4.16	42%	3rd
2022 450 SX	1	13	7	13	5	11	8	13	7	DNS	DNS	DNS	DNS	DNS	DNS	DNS	DNS	8.66	11%	12th
2022 450 MX	2	4	1	4	5	4	13	4	5	3	7	9	—	—	—	—	—	5.08	25%	4th
2023 450 SX	5	11	4	3	8	4	5	7	1	5	6	5	3	3	3	2	DNF	4.68	38%	4th
2024 450 SX	10	3	12	7	3	1	8	5	3	2	5	12	3	DNF	OUT	OUT	OUT	5.69	46%	7th
2025 450 SX	2	4	2	3	DNF	2	2	1	7	5	4	4	3	7	6	OUT	OUT	3.71	50%	5th
2026 450 SX	2 ANA (California)	3 SDI (California)	8 ANA (California)	3 HOU (Texas)	1 GLE (Arizona)	10 SEA (Washington (state))	4 ARL (Texas)	3 DAY (Florida)	5 IND (Indiana)	2 BIR (Alabama)	1 DET (Michigan)	1 STL (Missouri)	3 NAS (Tennessee)	1 CLE (Ohio)	1 PHI (Pennsylvania)	2 DEN (Colorado)	5 SLC (Utah)	3.29	71%	1st

== SMX Results ==
Year	Rnd 1	Rnd 2	Rnd 3	Average Finish	Podium Percent	Place
2023 450 SMX	2 CON (North Carolina)	2 CHI (Illinois)	2 LAC (California)	2.00	100%	2nd
2024 450 SMX	5 CON (North Carolina)	6 FOR (Texas)	7 LVE (Nevada)	6.00	-	6th
2025 450 SMX	6 CON (North Carolina)	4 STL (Missouri)	4 LVE (Nevada)	4.67	-	4th
2026 450 SMX	2 COL (Ohio)	3 LOS (California)	4 RID (Missouri)	3.00	66%	4th

== WSX results ==
Year	Rnd 1	Rnd 2	Rnd 3	Rnd 4	Rnd 5	Average Finish	Podium Percent	Place
2022 450 WSX	2	2	—	—	—	2.00	100%	1st
2023 450 WSX	1	4	1	—	—	2.00	66%	1st
2024 450 WSX	2	2	3	1	—	2.00	100%	2nd
2025 450 WSX	1	2	1	OUT	OUT	1.33	100%	4th

== Major titles ==
- 2006 – German Junior Cup Champion 85cc
- 2007 – Junior World Champion 85cc
- 2008 – German Youngster Cup Champion
- 2009 – German ADAC MX Masters Champion
- 2010 – German ADAC MX Masters Champion
- 2011 – Motocross World Champion MX2
- 2012 – 1st place at Motocross des Nations (MxoN) in Lommel (Belgium)
- 2013 – AMA Supercross West Champion 250SX (Note: Chief rival 2013 Supercross: Eli Tomac.)
- 2014 – AMA Motocross Champion 450 class
- 2015 – Monster Energy Cup winner
- 2016 – AMA Motocross Champion 450 Class
- 2019 – Red Bull Straight Rhythm 250cc winner
- 2022 SX1 WSX Champion
- 2023 SX1 WSX Champion
- 2026 -Monster Energy AMA Supercross Championship 450 champion

== Personal life ==
=== Early life and family background ===
Roczen was born on 29 April 1994 in the village of Mattstedt, in the state of Thuringia, in former East Germany. By the age of three, Roczen was entering competitive races.

Growing up in modest financial circumstances, Roczen's parents recognised his exceptional talent early and committed to supporting his development. The family travelled extensively across Europe in a motorhome so that Roczen could compete in international youth events.

The close working relationship between father and son came to an end when Roczen relocated to the United States and signed with RCH Suzuki. In an interview with Motocross Action Magazine, Roczen explained the decision as a necessary step for both of them to grow independently.

In recognition of his sporting achievements, Roczen was named an honorary citizen of Mattstedt on 14 October 2011, following his MX2 World Championship victory — making him the first German motocross world champion since Paul Friedrichs in 1968.

=== Marriage and children ===
Roczen married Courtney Savage in late 2018. The couple had been in a long-term relationship prior to the marriage, and Courtney played a central role in Ken's recovery from his career-threatening injuries in 2017 and 2018. During his hospitalisation, she remained at his bedside, managing communication with family and friends while helping him through the rehabilitation process. Roczen has credited her presence as a decisive factor in both his personal recovery and his decision to return to racing. Speaking to Motocross Action Magazine, he said that marriage was something he had never previously considered until meeting Courtney, noting that his own parents had never married.

The couple's first son, Griffin Savage Roczen, was born on 9 September 2020. Roczen has spoken publicly about how fatherhood changed his perspective on racing and life, describing the experience as having made "everything so much better". Their second son, Rafe, was born in 2023. The family also has a French bulldog named Rio.

=== Residence and lifestyle ===
After moving to the United States as a teenager, Roczen has lived in several locations including San Clemente, California, and more recently Clermont, Florida. He has also used St. George, Utah, as a training base, where he built a private practice track.

Away from racing, Roczen is an avid surfer, golfer, and wakeboarder. He has described surfing as his primary post-retirement ambition, expressing a desire to spend his time in the ocean once his competitive career concludes. He is also a keen cook and has been known to host cookouts for his team and family while on the road during the racing season. In 2024, he publicly adopted an animal-based diet influenced by the nutritional approach advocated by Paul Saladino.

Roczen became a naturalised citizen of the United States in March 2025.

Roczen maintains an active social media presence, sharing training footage, family moments, and behind-the-scenes content from the racing circuit with over one million followers on Instagram.
