= Quercus carduchorum =

Conservation status
- Data Deficient (IUCN 3.1)

Scientific classification
- Kingdom: Plantae
- Clade: Embryophytes
- Clade: Tracheophytes
- Clade: Spermatophytes
- Clade: Angiosperms
- Clade: Eudicots
- Clade: Rosids
- Order: Fagales
- Family: Fagaceae
- Genus: Quercus
- Subgenus: Quercus subg. Cerris
- Section: Quercus sect. Cerris
- Species: Q. carduchorum

Binomial name
- Quercus carduchorum K.Koch

Synonyms
- Quercus karduchorum Dippel

Species of flowering plant

Quercus carduchorum is a species of oak. It is a tree endemic to northwestern Iran. It grows in the northern Zagros Mountains of Kurdistan Province.

The species was described by Karl Koch in 1849.
