= Fuernrohria =

Scientific classification
- Kingdom: Plantae
- Clade: Tracheophytes
- Clade: Angiosperms
- Clade: Eudicots
- Clade: Asterids
- Order: Apiales
- Family: Apiaceae
- Subfamily: Apioideae
- Tribe: Careae
- Genus: Fuernrohria; K.Koch

Genus of plants

Fuernrohria is a monotypic genus of flowering plants belonging to the family Apiaceae. It contains one species, Fuernrohria setifolia K.Koch.

Its native range is Turkey, North Caucasus, Transcaucasus and north-western Iran.

The genus name of Fuernrohria is in honour of August Emanuel Fürnrohr (1804–1861), German botanist and professor at a school in Regensburg, it was first published and described in Linnaea Vol.16 on page 356 in 1842.
