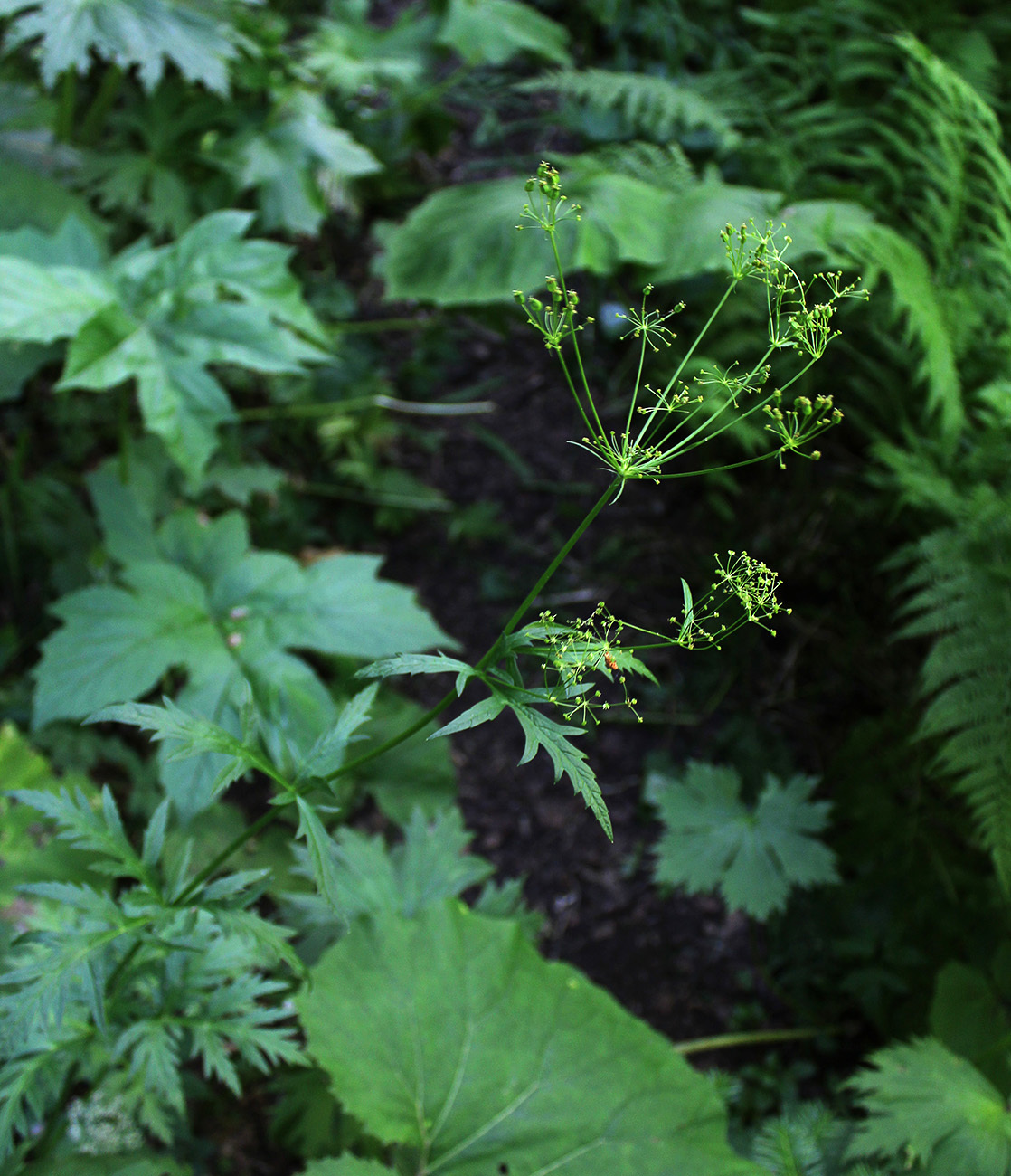

Scientific classification
- Kingdom: Plantae
- Clade: Tracheophytes
- Clade: Angiosperms
- Clade: Eudicots
- Clade: Asterids
- Order: Apiales
- Family: Apiaceae
- Subfamily: Apioideae
- Tribe: Pleurospermeae
- Genus: Eleutherospermum; K.Koch
- Species: E. cicutarium

Binomial name
- Eleutherospermum cicutarium (M.Bieb.) Boiss.

Synonyms
- Eleutherospermum chrysanthum Sommier & Levier; Eleutherospermum grandifolium K.Koch; Hladnikia cicutaria Boiss.; Ligusticum caucasicum Willd. ex Schult.; Physospermum acteifolium Eichw.; Physospermum cicutarium Spreng.; Smyrnium cicutarium M.Bieb.

= Eleutherospermum =

Genus of plants

Eleutherospermum is a genus of flowering plants belonging to the family Apiaceae. Its only species is Eleutherospermum cicutarium. Its native range is Western Asia to the Caucasus.
