= Johann Gottlob Töpfer =

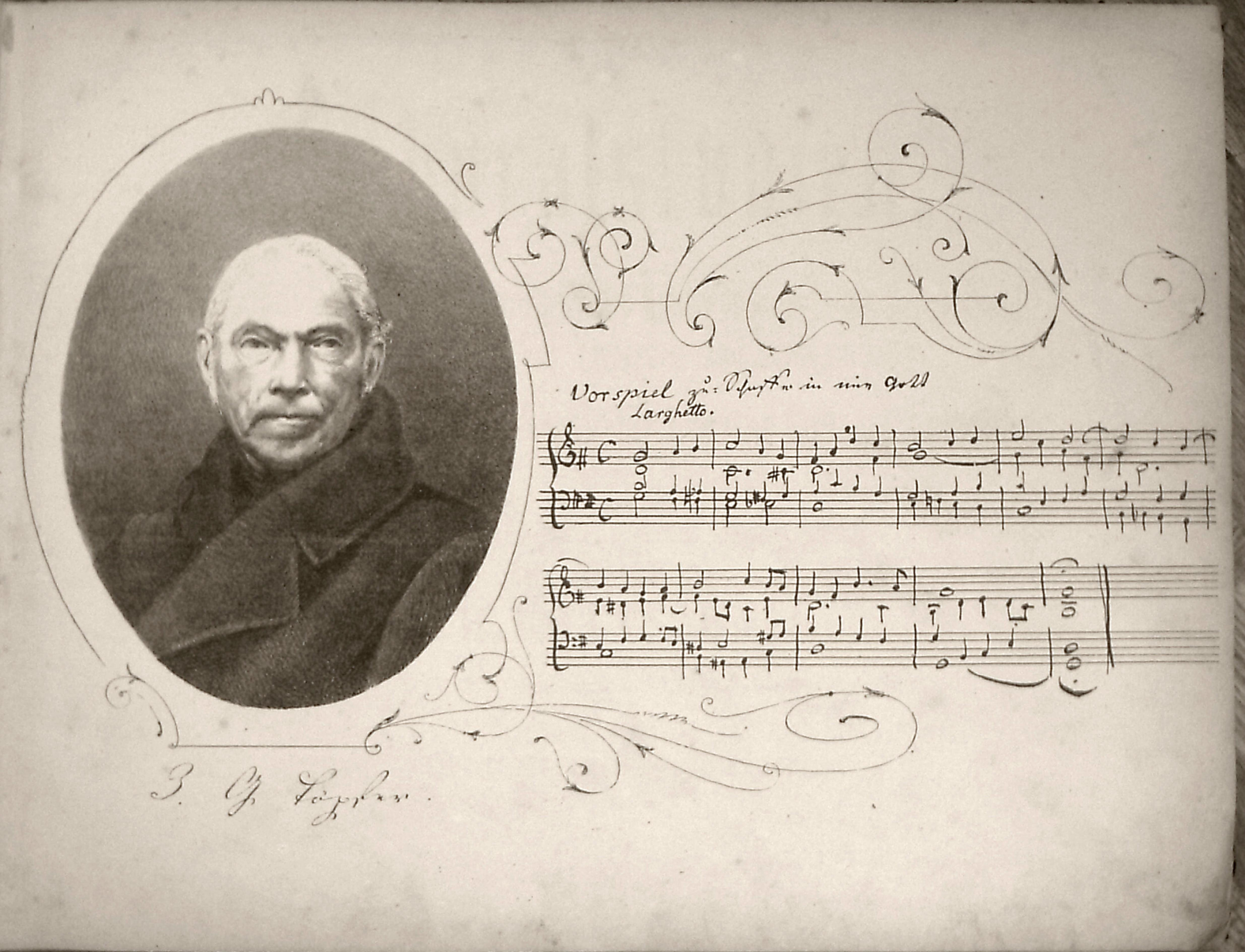

Background information
- Born: 4 December 1791; Niederroßla, Holy Roman Empire
- Died: 8 June 1870 (aged 78) Weimar, Kingdom of Prussia, German Empire

Johann Gottlob Töpfer (1791–1870) was a German organ theorist, advisor, organist, teacher and composer. He was born on 4 December 1791 in Niederroßla, and died on 8 June 1870 in Weimar. Between 1804 and 1808 Töpfer attended the Wilhelm-Ernst-Gymnasium school at Weimar. In 1830 he was appointed organist at the city church of Saint Peter and Paul at Weimar. He held this post until his death, despite attempting to resign in 1844 because of unreasonable conditions; he withdrew his request later. Töpfer was respected by his contemporaries as a virtuoso and organ expert. He enjoyed a relationship of mutual respect with Franz Liszt amongst others.

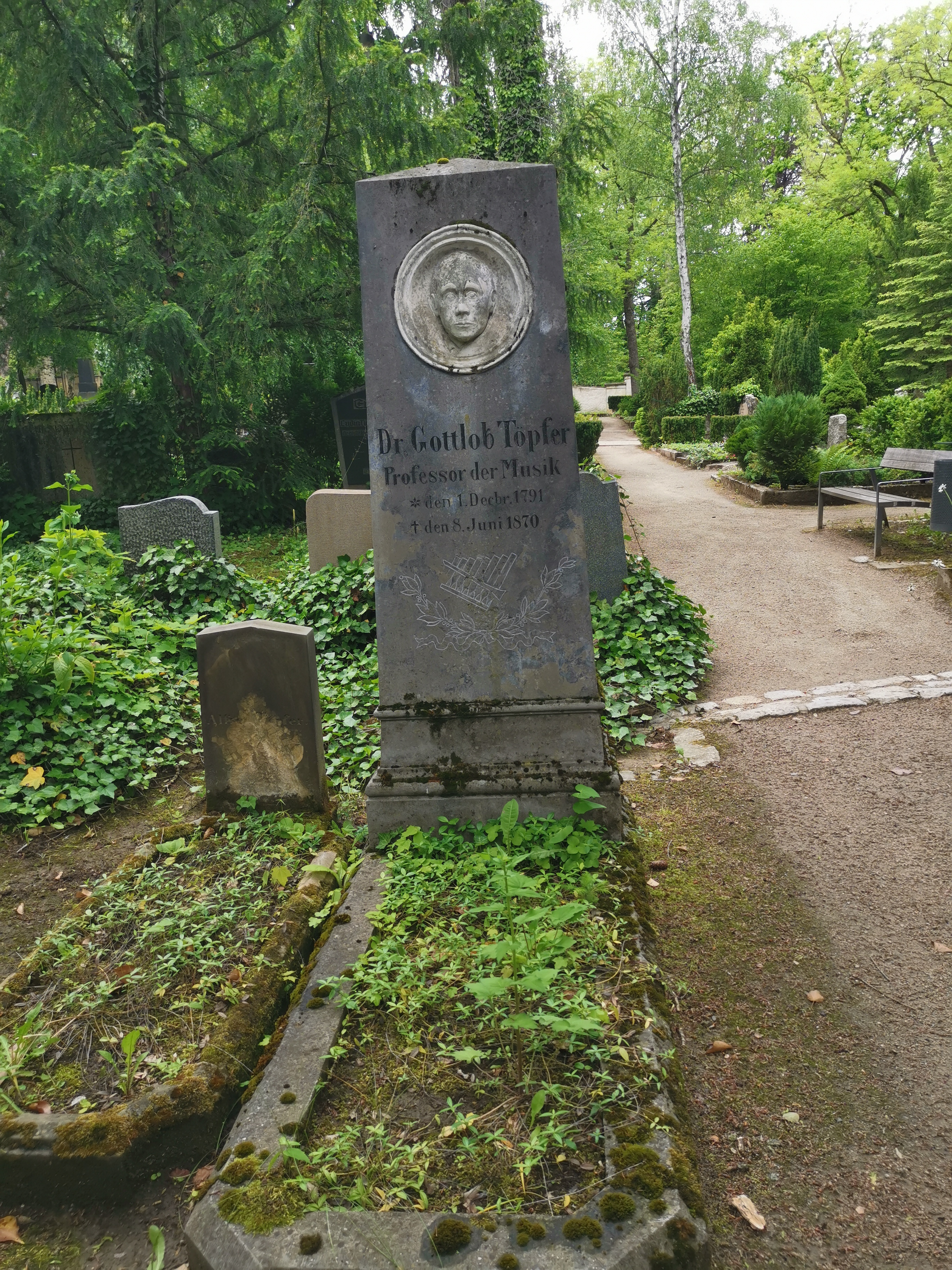
Gravestone

As a composer he left over 400 works, mostly chorale preludes for the organ. His historical legacy is however his writing on the construction of organs. His definition of a Normalmensur is still used today as a basic reference-point for calculation and description of the scaling of organ pipes. Töpfer's publications in 1833, 1843, and 1855 were widely influential because they appeared at a time when the French and English organ makers were open to new, foreign ideas, and they gave full details of pipe scales, wind chambers, pallets, bellows and action.

He is buried in the historical cemetery of Weimar.

== Works ==
- Die Orgelbau-Kunst nach einer neuen Theorie dargestellt und auf mathematische und physikalische Grundsätze gestützt. ("The art of organ building, described by a new theory and supported by mathematical and physical principles") Weimar, 1833.
- Erster Nachtrag zur Orgelbaukunst. ("First addendum to the art of organ building") Weimar, 1834.
- Anleitung zur Erhaltung und Stimmung der Orgel. Für Organisten und Landschullehrer. ("Instructions for the maintenance and tuning of the organ, for organists and country teachers.") Jena, 1840, ^{2}1865.
- Die Scheiblersche Stimm-Methode. ("The Scheibler method of voicing") Erfurt, 1842.
- Die Orgel, Zweck und Beschaffenheit ihrer Theile, Gesetze ihrer Construction, und Wahl der dazu gehörigen Materialien. ("The organ, purpose and nature of its parts, laws of its construction, and the choice of materials required for it.") Erfurt, 1843. Reprint Merseburger, 2010.
- Lehrbuch der Orgelbaukunst. ("Text book on organ-building.") 4 vols. in two parts und illustrations. Weimar, 1855.
- Die Theorie und Praxis des Orgelbaues. ("The theory and practice of organ-building.") Second completely reworked edition of the Lehrbuch, "for the use of organ builders, organ auditors, organists and architects, edited by Max Allihn, accompanied by a volume containing 65 plates. Weimar, 1888. Bernhard Friedrich Voigt.
- Atlas zur Theorie und Praxis des Orgelbaues. Zweite völlig umgearbeitete Auflage des Lehrbuches der Orgelbaukunst von J. G. Töpfer. Für den Gebrauch des Orgelbauers, Orgelrevisors, Organisten und Architekten herausgegeben von Max Allihn. Mit 75 Foliotafeln. Leipzig [sic] 1888. Verlag von Berh. Friedr. Voigt.

== Literature ==
- Robert Eitner (1894). "Töpfer, Johann Gottlob". Allgemeine Deutsche Biographie (in German). Vol. 38. Leipzig: Duncker & Humblot. pp. 445–446.
- Hans-Christian Tacke: Johann Gottlob Töpfer, Leben – Werk – Wirksamkeit, Kassel 2002, ISBN 3-761-81577-8

== See also ==
- Orgel der Kirche von Denstedt
