= Wilche =

Wilche is a surname. Notable people with the surname include:

- Cyriacus Wilche (ca.1620–1667), German composer
- Julie Præst Wilche (born 1971 or 1972), Danish civil servant and diplomat
