= Kromsdorf =

- Ortsteil of Ilmtal-Weinstraße
- Interactive map of Kromsdorf
- Location within Germany Location within Thuringia
- Coordinates: 50°59′56″N 11°22′25″E
- Country: Germany
- State: Thuringia
- District: Weimarer Land
- Municipality: Ilmtal-Weinstraße

Area
  - Total: 10.74 km^{2} (4.15 sq mi)
- Elevation: 200 m (660 ft)

Population (2017-12-31)
  - Total: 1,449
  - Density: 134.9/km^{2} (349.4/sq mi)
- Time zone: UTC+01:00 (CET)
  - Summer (DST): UTC+02:00 (CEST)
- Postal codes: 99441
- Dialling codes: 03643
- Vehicle registration: AP
- Website: http://www.kromsdorf-denstedt.de

Kromsdorf (German pronunciation: [ˈkʁɔmsˌdɔʁf]) is a village and a former municipality in the district of Weimarer Land in Thuringia, Germany. Since 1 January 2019, it is part of the municipality Ilmtal-Weinstraße. It was part of the Verwaltungsgemeinschaft Ilmtal-Weinstraße until 31 December 2013. It borders on Weimar (quarters Süßenborn and Tiefurt), and is situated northeast of the city, not far from Schloss Tiefurt, on both banks of the river Ilm.

== Structure ==
Kromsdorf consists of the settlements Kromsdorf-Nord (formerly Großkromsdorf) on the left bank of the Ilm, Kromsdorf-Süd (formerly Kleinkromsdorf) on the right bank, and Denstedt.

== Places of interest ==
- The park wall of the Renaissance castle Kromsdorf is decorated with 64 portrait busts. Today the castle serves as a culture center.
- Denstedt Castle, in the village Denstedt, has a remarkable tower.

== Sports ==
- TSV 1928 Kromsdorf e. V. (football, table tennis, ninepins, volleyball)
