= Willerstedt =

- Ortsteil of Ilmtal-Weinstraße
- Interactive map of Willerstedt
- Location within Germany Location within Thuringia
- Coordinates: 51°5′25″N 11°27′13″E
- Country: Germany
- State: Thuringia
- District: Weimarer Land
- Municipality: Ilmtal-Weinstraße

Area
  - Total: 6.71 km^{2} (2.59 sq mi)

Population (2012-12-31)
  - Total: 293
  - Density: 43.7/km^{2} (113/sq mi)
- Time zone: UTC+01:00 (CET)
  - Summer (DST): UTC+02:00 (CEST)
- Postal codes: 99510
- Dialling codes: 036463
- Vehicle registration: AP
- Website: www.vg-ilmtal-weinstrasse.de

Willerstedt (German pronunciation: [ˈvɪlɐˌʃtɛt]) is a village and a former municipality in the Weimarer Land district of Thuringia, Germany. Since 31 December 2013, it is part of the municipality Ilmtal-Weinstraße.
