= Oberreißen =

- Ortsteil of Ilmtal-Weinstraße
- Interactive map of Oberreißen
- Location within Germany Location within Thuringia
- Coordinates: 51°5′14″N 11°24′48″E
- Country: Germany
- State: Thuringia
- District: Weimarer Land
- Municipality: Ilmtal-Weinstraße

Area
  - Total: 4.98 km^{2} (1.92 sq mi)
- Elevation: 240 m (790 ft)

Population (2012-12-31)
  - Total: 178
  - Density: 35.7/km^{2} (92.6/sq mi)
- Time zone: UTC+01:00 (CET)
  - Summer (DST): UTC+02:00 (CEST)
- Postal codes: 99510
- Dialling codes: 036373
- Vehicle registration: AP
- Website: www.vg-ilmtal-weinstrasse.de

Oberreißen (German pronunciation: [ˈoːbɐˌʁaɪsn̩], lit. 'Upper Reißen', in contrast to "Lower Reißen") is a village and a former municipality in the Weimarer Land district of Thuringia, Germany. Since 31 December 2013, it is part of the municipality Ilmtal-Weinstraße.

== See also ==
- Media related to Oberreißen at Wikimedia Commons
