= Johann Ludwig Krebs =

German Baroque musician and composer (1713–1780)

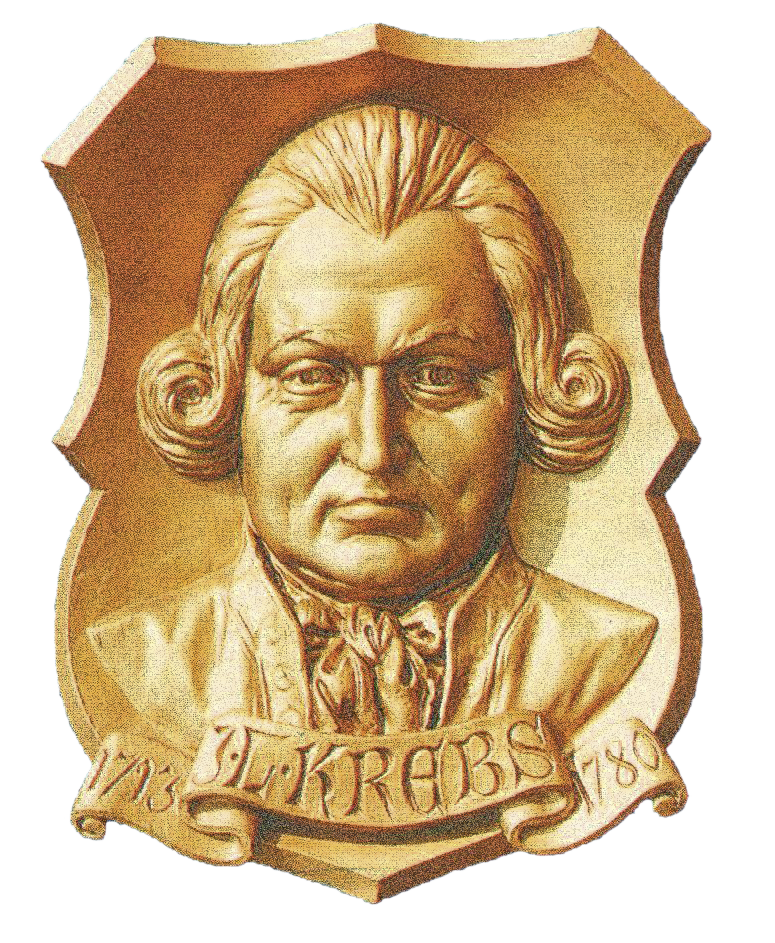
- A carving of Krebs, likely the only surviving image of his face
- Born: Buttelstedt
- Baptised: 12 October 1713
- Died: 1 January 1780 (aged 66); Altenburg
- Era: Baroque
- Works: List of compositions
- Spouse: Johanna Sophie Nackens
- Children: 7
- Parent: Johann Tobias Krebs

Johann Ludwig Krebs (baptized 12 October 1713 – 1 January 1780) was a German Baroque musician and composer for the pipe organ, harpsichord, other instruments and orchestras. His output also included chamber music, choral works and concertos.

== Life ==
Krebs was born in 1713 in Buttelstedt to Johann Tobias Krebs, an organist. At least three of his brothers were musically talented. Krebs was sent to Leipzig to study organ, lute, and the violin.

Krebs studied with Johann Sebastian Bach on the organ. Bach (who had also instructed Krebs's father) held Krebs in high standing. From a technical standpoint, Krebs was unrivaled next to Bach in his organ proficiency. However, Krebs found it difficult to obtain a patron or a cathedral post. His Baroque style was being supplanted by the newer galant music style and the classical music era.

Krebs took a small post in Zwickau, and in 1755 he was appointed court organist of Saxe-Gotha-Altenburg under Prince Friedrich. Krebs had seven children and struggled to feed his family. Despite never holding a court composer post, and never being commissioned for a work, Krebs was able to compose a significant collection of works, though few were published until the 1900s.

== Works ==
Krebs's counterpoint is considered by many to be comparable to Bach's, but it was old-fashioned and excessively complex for the galant era, which espoused clarity and simplicity.

Krebs's Fantasia in F minor for oboe and organ is one of his best-known works, as is the Eight Short Preludes and Fugues that are sometimes attributed to him as well as to his father and J. S. Bach. He is also remembered for two large-scale concertos for lute and orchestra. Krebs's three sons became well-known performers in their day, and Johann Gottfried Krebs was a composer of Lieder.

"Prelude in F"
Performed in 2010 on Link organ in Feuchtwangen, Germany (1:22)

Krebs’ organ works include the following:

- 7 Preludes and Fugues
- 2 Toccatas and Fugues
- 3 Preludes
- 4 Preludes (small)
- 2 Fantasias and Fugues (one fugue is a fragment)
- 3 Fantasias
- 11 Fugues
- 17 Trios
- 35 Chorale Settings (with 5 Variants and 6 other Chorale Settings of dubious authenticity)
- 13 Chorales with 3 Settings of each – "Clavierübung" (Nuremberg, 1752–1753)
- 5 Fantasias for wind instrument (trumpet, flute, oboe) and organ; 1 Variant
- 15 Chorale Settings for wind instrument and organ; 1 Fragment

== Bibliography ==
- Clavier Ubung Bestehend in verschiedenen vorspielen und veränderungen einiger Kirchen Gesaenge (Nürnberg, J.U. Haffner, ca. 1744)
- Clavier-Ubung bestehet in einer [...] Suite [...] Zweyter Theil (Nürnberg, J.U. Haffner, ca. 1744)
- Clavier-Ubung bestehend in sechs Sonatinen … IIIter Theil (Nürnberg, J.U. Haffner, ca. 1744)
