= Cyriacus Wilche =

Baroque Composer from Germany

Cyriacus Wilche or Cyriakus Wilcke (c.1620 in Pfiffelbach– 26 April 1667 in Jena) was a German composer of the Baroque period.

== Background ==
Cyriacus Wilche worked as a musician at the court of Weimar until 1662. From 1662 until his death in 1667, he was employed as a musician in Jena. The godfather of one of his children was Bernhard II, Duke of Saxe-Jena.

He is best known today for his Battaglia for 2 violins, 2 violas and continuo. Possibly his only surviving work, it has survived in manuscript form as part of the Rost Codex. It was recorded by Musica Antiqua Köln.

Wilche was possibly the grandfather of Anna Magdalena Bach, the second wife of Johann Sebastian Bach.
