= Nirmsdorf =

- Ortsteil of Ilmtal-Weinstraße
- Interactive map of Nirmsdorf
- Location within Germany Location within Thuringia
- Coordinates: 51°5′40″N 11°28′13″E
- Country: Germany
- State: Thuringia
- District: Weimarer Land
- Municipality: Ilmtal-Weinstraße

Area
  - Total: 2.72 km^{2} (1.05 sq mi)
- Elevation: 200 m (660 ft)

Population (2012-12-31)
  - Total: 88
  - Density: 32/km^{2} (84/sq mi)
- Time zone: UTC+01:00 (CET)
  - Summer (DST): UTC+02:00 (CEST)
- Postal codes: 99510
- Dialling codes: 036463
- Vehicle registration: AP
- Website: www.vg-ilmtal-weinstrasse.de

Nirmsdorf (German pronunciation: [ˈnɪʁmsˌdɔʁf]) is a village and a former municipality in the Weimarer Land district of Thuringia, Germany. Since 31 December 2013, it is part of the municipality Ilmtal-Weinstraße.
