= Ilmtal-Weinstraße =

- Municipality
- Coat of arms

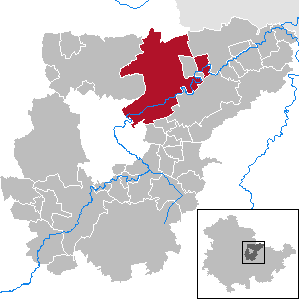
- Location of Ilmtal-Weinstraße within Weimarer Land district
- Interactive map of Ilmtal-Weinstraße
- Location within Germany Location within Thuringia
- Coordinates: 51°03′N 11°26′E
- Country: Germany
- State: Thuringia
- District: Weimarer Land

Government
  - Mayor (2020–26): Katrin Wörpel

Area
  - Total: 84.7 km^{2} (32.7 sq mi)
- Elevation: 250 m (820 ft)

Population (2025-12-31)
  - Total: 6,169
  - Density: 72.8/km^{2} (189/sq mi)
- Time zone: UTC+01:00 (CET)
  - Summer (DST): UTC+02:00 (CEST)
- Postal codes: 99510
- Dialling codes: 036373, 03644, 036462, 036463
- Vehicle registration: AP
- Website: www.ilmtal-weinstrasse.de

Ilmtal-Weinstraße (German pronunciation: [ˈɪlmˌtaːl ˈvaɪnˌʃtʁaːsə], lit. 'Ilm Valley-Wine Route') is a municipality in the district Weimarer Land, in Thuringia, Germany. It was named after the river Ilm, that flows through the municipality. It was formed on 31 December 2013 by the merger of the former municipalities Liebstedt, Mattstedt, Niederreißen, Niederroßla, Nirmsdorf, Oberreißen, Oßmannstedt, Pfiffelbach and Willerstedt. Before, these municipalities had cooperated in the Verwaltungsgemeinschaft ("collective municipality") Ilmtal-Weinstraße, which was disbanded. The seat of the municipality and of the former Verwaltungsgemeinschaft is in Pfiffelbach. The former municipalities Kromsdorf (which had been part of the former Verwaltungsgemeinschaft Ilmtal-Weinstraße), Rohrbach and Leutenthal were merged into Ilmtal-Weinstraße in January 2019.

Area codes:

- 03644 for Mattstedt, Niederroßla and district Wersdorf of municipality Pfiffelbach
- 036462 for Liebstedt, Oßmannstedt, Pfiffelbach
- 036463 for Nirmsdorf, Willerstedt
- 036373 for Niederreißen and Oberreißen
