= Oßmannstedt =

- Ortsteil of Ilmtal-Weinstraße
- Coat of arms
- Interactive map of Oßmannstedt
- Location within Germany Location within Thuringia
- Coordinates: 51°1′7″N 11°25′38″E
- Country: Germany
- State: Thuringia
- District: Weimarer Land
- Municipality: Ilmtal-Weinstraße

Area
  - Total: 16.50 km^{2} (6.37 sq mi)
- Elevation: 200 m (660 ft)

Population (2012-12-31)
  - Total: 1,240
  - Density: 75.2/km^{2} (195/sq mi)
- Time zone: UTC+01:00 (CET)
  - Summer (DST): UTC+02:00 (CEST)
- Postal codes: 99510
- Dialling codes: 036462
- Vehicle registration: AP
- Website: www.ossmannstedt.info

Oßmannstedt (German pronunciation: [ˈɔsmanˌʃtɛt]) is a village and a former municipality in the Weimarer Land district of Thuringia, Germany. Since 31 December 2013, it is part of the municipality Ilmtal-Weinstraße.
