= Niederroßla =

- Ortsteil of Ilmtal-Weinstraße
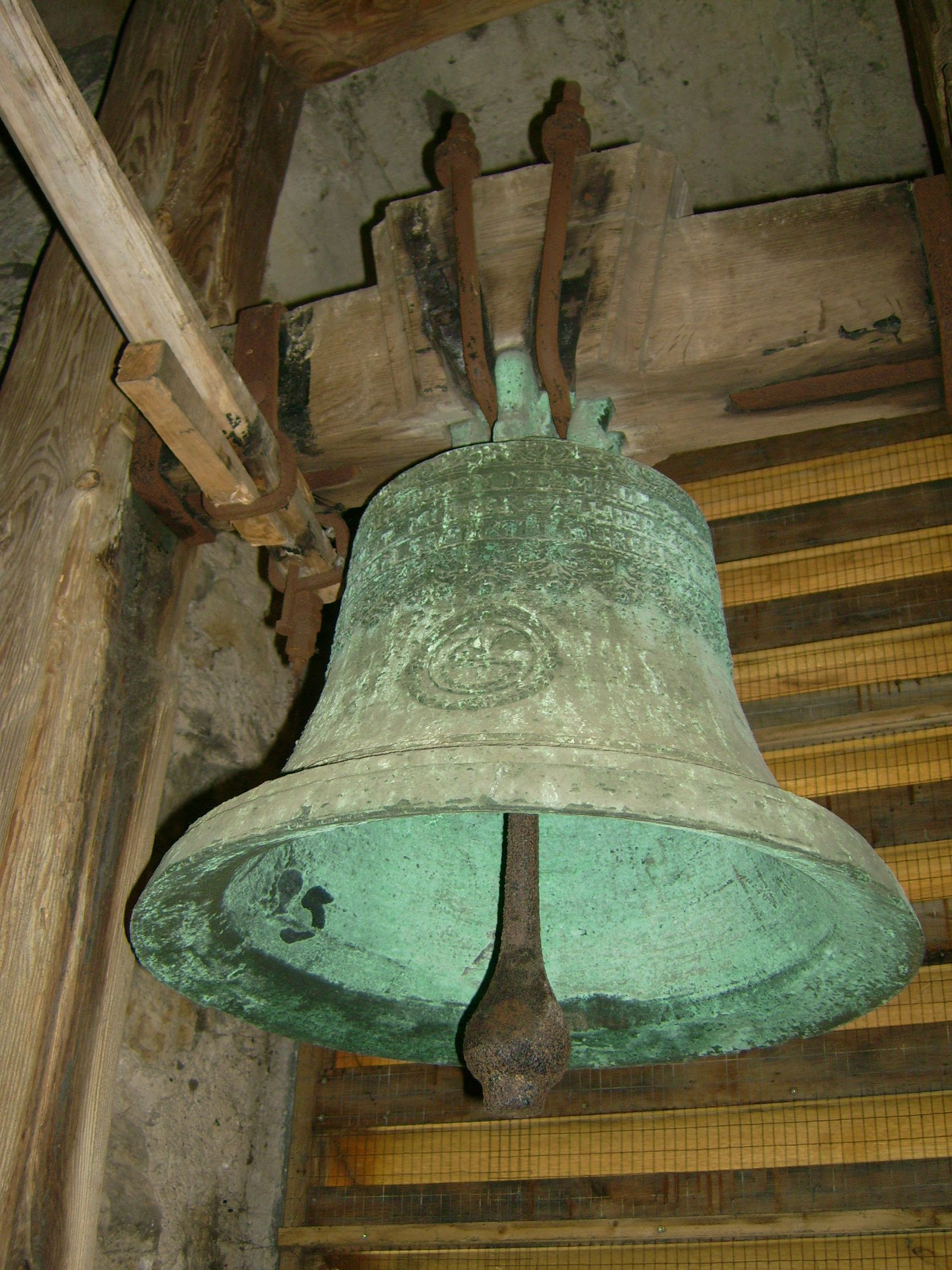
- Interactive map of Niederroßla
- Location within Germany Location within Thuringia
- Coordinates: 51°2′N 11°29′E
- Country: Germany
- State: Thuringia
- District: Weimarer Land
- Municipality: Ilmtal-Weinstraße

Area
  - Total: 5.84 km^{2} (2.25 sq mi)
- Elevation: 175 m (574 ft)

Population (2012-12-31)
  - Total: 1,108
  - Density: 190/km^{2} (491/sq mi)
- Time zone: UTC+01:00 (CET)
  - Summer (DST): UTC+02:00 (CEST)
- Postal codes: 99510
- Dialling codes: 03644
- Vehicle registration: AP

Niederroßla (German pronunciation: [ˈniːdɐˌʁɔsla], lit. 'Lower Roßla', in contrast to "Upper Roßla") is a village and a former municipality in the Weimarer Land district of Thuringia, Germany. Since 31 December 2013, it is part of the municipality Ilmtal-Weinstraße.
