= Am Ettersberg =

- Municipality
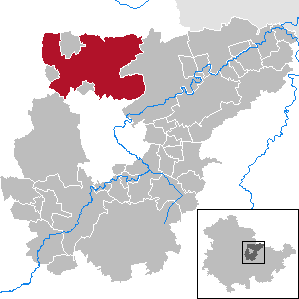
- Location of Am Ettersberg within Weimarer Land district
- Interactive map of Am Ettersberg
- Location within Germany Location within Thuringia
- Coordinates: 51°04′N 11°15′E
- Country: Germany
- State: Thuringia
- District: Weimarer Land
- Subdivisions: 19

Area
  - Total: 92.44 km^{2} (35.69 sq mi)
- Elevation: 290 m (950 ft)

Population (2025-12-31)
  - Total: 7,010
  - Density: 75.8/km^{2} (196/sq mi)
- Time zone: UTC+01:00 (CET)
  - Summer (DST): UTC+02:00 (CEST)
- Postal codes: 99439
- Dialling codes: 03643, 034651, 036452
- Vehicle registration: AP

Am Ettersberg (German pronunciation: [am ˈʔɛtɐsbɛʁk], lit. 'On the Ettersberg') is a municipality in the district Weimarer Land, in Thuringia, Germany. It was created with effect from 1 January 2019 by the merger of the former municipalities of Berlstedt, Buttelstedt, Großobringen, Heichelheim, Kleinobringen, Krautheim, Ramsla, Sachsenhausen, Schwerstedt, Vippachedelhausen and Wohlsborn.
