= Leutenthal =

- Ortsteil of Ilmtal-Weinstraße
- Interactive map of Leutenthal
- Location within Germany Location within Thuringia
- Coordinates: 51°3′22″N 11°22′26″E
- Country: Germany
- State: Thuringia
- District: Weimarer Land
- Municipality: Ilmtal-Weinstraße

Area
  - Total: 5.51 km^{2} (2.13 sq mi)
- Elevation: 230 m (750 ft)

Population (2017-12-31)
  - Total: 256
  - Density: 46.5/km^{2} (120/sq mi)
- Time zone: UTC+01:00 (CET)
  - Summer (DST): UTC+02:00 (CEST)
- Postal codes: 99439
- Dialling codes: 036451
- Vehicle registration: AP

Leutenthal (German pronunciation: [ˈlɔʏtn̩ˌtaːl]) is a village and a former municipality in the Weimarer Land district of Thuringia, Germany. Since 1 January 2019, it is part of the municipality Ilmtal-Weinstraße.
