= Berlstedt =

- Ortsteil of Am Ettersberg
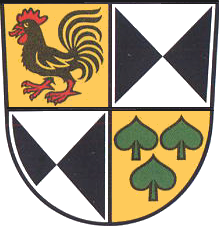
- Coat of arms
- Interactive map of Berlstedt
- Location within Germany Location within Thuringia
- Coordinates: 51°3′40″N 11°14′39″E
- Country: Germany
- State: Thuringia
- District: Weimarer Land
- Municipality: Am Ettersberg

Area
  - Total: 18.97 km^{2} (7.32 sq mi)
- Elevation: 228 m (748 ft)

Population (2017-12-31)
  - Total: 1,770
  - Density: 93.3/km^{2} (242/sq mi)
- Time zone: UTC+01:00 (CET)
  - Summer (DST): UTC+02:00 (CEST)
- Postal codes: 99439
- Dialling codes: 036452
- Vehicle registration: AP

Berlstedt (German pronunciation: [ˈbɛʁlʃtɛt]) is a village and a former municipality in the Weimarer Land district of Thuringia, Germany. On 1 December 2007, the former municipality Hottelstedt was incorporated by Berlstedt. Since 1 January 2019, it is part of the municipality Am Ettersberg.
