= Schwerstedt =

- Ortsteil of Am Ettersberg
- Interactive map of Schwerstedt
- Location within Germany Location within Thuringia
- Coordinates: 51°4′20″N 11°17′24″E
- Country: Germany
- State: Thuringia
- District: Weimarer Land
- Municipality: Am Ettersberg

Area
  - Total: 6.81 km^{2} (2.63 sq mi)
- Elevation: 204 m (669 ft)

Population (2017-12-31)
  - Total: 329
  - Density: 48.3/km^{2} (125/sq mi)
- Time zone: UTC+01:00 (CET)
  - Summer (DST): UTC+02:00 (CEST)
- Postal codes: 99439
- Dialling codes: 036452
- Vehicle registration: AP

Schwerstedt (German pronunciation: [ˈʃveːɐ̯ʃtɛt]) is a village and a former municipality in the Weimarer Land district of Thuringia, Germany. Since 1 January 2019, it is part of the municipality Am Ettersberg.
