= Ramsla =

- Ortsteil of Am Ettersberg
- Interactive map of Ramsla
- Location within Germany Location within Thuringia
- Coordinates: 51°3′2″N 11°17′9″E
- Country: Germany
- State: Thuringia
- District: Weimarer Land
- Municipality: Am Ettersberg

Area
  - Total: 4.05 km^{2} (1.56 sq mi)
- Elevation: 238 m (781 ft)

Population (2017-12-31)
  - Total: 304
  - Density: 75.1/km^{2} (194/sq mi)
- Time zone: UTC+01:00 (CET)
  - Summer (DST): UTC+02:00 (CEST)
- Postal codes: 99439
- Dialling codes: 036452
- Vehicle registration: AP

Ramsla (German pronunciation: [ˈʁamsla]) is a village and a former municipality in the Weimarer Land district of Thuringia, Germany. Since 1 January 2019, it is part of the municipality Am Ettersberg.
