= Wohlsborn =

- Ortsteil of Am Ettersberg
- Interactive map of Wohlsborn
- Location within Germany Location within Thuringia
- Coordinates: 51°1′56″N 11°21′54″E
- Country: Germany
- State: Thuringia
- District: Weimarer Land
- Municipality: Am Ettersberg

Area
  - Total: 4.04 km^{2} (1.56 sq mi)

Population (2017-12-31)
  - Total: 477
  - Density: 118/km^{2} (306/sq mi)
- Time zone: UTC+01:00 (CET)
  - Summer (DST): UTC+02:00 (CEST)
- Postal codes: 99439
- Dialling codes: 03643
- Vehicle registration: AP

Wohlsborn (German pronunciation: [ˈvoːlsbɔʁn]) is a village and a former municipality in the Weimarer Land district of Thuringia, Germany. Since 1 January 2019, it has been part of the municipality of Am Ettersberg.
