= Vippachedelhausen =

- Ortsteil of Am Ettersberg
- Interactive map of Vippachedelhausen
- Location within Germany Location within Thuringia
- Coordinates: 51°4′51″N 11°12′34″E
- Country: Germany
- State: Thuringia
- District: Weimarer Land
- Municipality: Am Ettersberg

Area
  - Total: 10.34 km^{2} (3.99 sq mi)
- Elevation: 188 m (617 ft)

Population (2017-12-31)
  - Total: 558
  - Density: 54.0/km^{2} (140/sq mi)
- Time zone: UTC+01:00 (CET)
  - Summer (DST): UTC+02:00 (CEST)
- Postal codes: 99439
- Dialling codes: 036452
- Vehicle registration: AP

Vippachedelhausen (German pronunciation: [fɪpaxʔeːdl̩ˈhaʊzn̩]) is a village and a former municipality in the Weimarer Land district of Thuringia, Germany. Since 1 January 2019, it is part of the municipality Am Ettersberg.
