= Kleinobringen =

- Ortsteil of Am Ettersberg
- Interactive map of Kleinobringen
- Location within Germany Location within Thuringia
- Coordinates: 51°1′57″N 11°18′39″E
- Country: Germany
- State: Thuringia
- District: Weimarer Land
- Municipality: Am Ettersberg

Area
  - Total: 3.11 km^{2} (1.20 sq mi)
- Elevation: 290 m (950 ft)

Population (2017-12-31)
  - Total: 317
  - Density: 102/km^{2} (264/sq mi)
- Time zone: UTC+01:00 (CET)
  - Summer (DST): UTC+02:00 (CEST)
- Postal codes: 99439
- Dialling codes: 03643
- Vehicle registration: AP

Kleinobringen (German pronunciation: [klaɪnˈʔoːbʁɪŋən], lit. 'Little Obringen', in contrast to "Big Obringen") is a village and a former municipality in the Weimarer Land district of Thuringia, Germany. Since 1 January 2019, it is part of the municipality Am Ettersberg.
