= Neumark, Thuringia =

Neumark
- Town
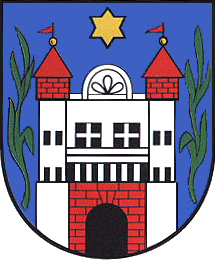
- Coat of arms

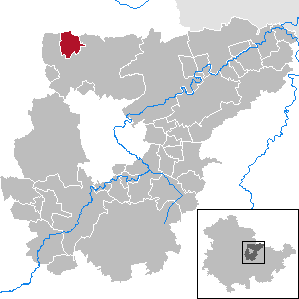
- Location of Neumark within Weimarer Land district
- Interactive map of Neumark
- Location within Germany Location within Thuringia
- Coordinates: 51°4′48″N 11°14′52″E
- Country: Germany
- State: Thuringia
- District: Weimarer Land

Government
  - Mayor (2022–28): Konstantin Pfeiffer

Area
  - Total: 8.67 km^{2} (3.35 sq mi)
- Elevation: 193 m (633 ft)

Population (2025-12-31)
  - Total: 462
  - Density: 53.3/km^{2} (138/sq mi)
- Time zone: UTC+01:00 (CET)
  - Summer (DST): UTC+02:00 (CEST)
- Postal codes: 99439
- Dialling codes: 036452
- Vehicle registration: AP

Neumark (German pronunciation: [ˈnɔʏmaʁk]) is a town in the Weimarer Land district, in Thuringia, Germany. It is situated 20 km northeast of Erfurt, and 12 km northwest of Weimar. Neumark is the second-least populous town (Stadt) in Germany (after Arnis), and is the least populous in what was formerly East Germany.

== History ==
Within the German Empire (1871-1918), Neumark was part of the Grand Duchy of Saxe-Weimar-Eisenach.
