= Ballstedt =

- Municipality
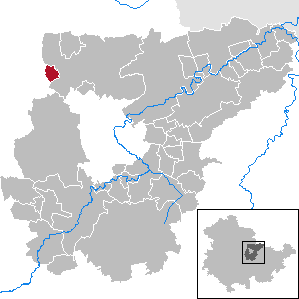
- Location of Ballstedt within Weimarer Land district
- Interactive map of Ballstedt
- Location within Germany Location within Thuringia
- Coordinates: 51°3′11″N 11°12′39″E
- Country: Germany
- State: Thuringia
- District: Weimarer Land

Government
  - Mayor (2022–28): Joachim Pommeranz

Area
  - Total: 3.36 km^{2} (1.30 sq mi)
- Elevation: 238 m (781 ft)

Population (2025-12-31)
  - Total: 285
  - Density: 84.8/km^{2} (220/sq mi)
- Time zone: UTC+01:00 (CET)
  - Summer (DST): UTC+02:00 (CEST)
- Postal codes: 99439
- Dialling codes: 036452
- Vehicle registration: AP

Ballstedt (German pronunciation: [ˈbalʃtɛt]) is a municipality in the Weimarer Land district of Thuringia, Germany.
