= Rohrbach, Weimarer Land =

Rohrbach
- Ortsteil of Ilmtal-Weinstraße
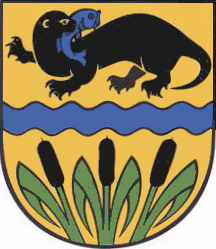
- Coat of arms
- Interactive map of Rohrbach
- Location within Germany Location within Thuringia
- Coordinates: 51°4′2″N 11°23′58″E
- Country: Germany
- State: Thuringia
- District: Weimarer Land
- Municipality: Ilmtal-Weinstraße

Area
  - Total: 3.48 km^{2} (1.34 sq mi)
- Elevation: 250 m (820 ft)

Population (2017-12-31)
  - Total: 207
  - Density: 59.5/km^{2} (154/sq mi)
- Time zone: UTC+01:00 (CET)
  - Summer (DST): UTC+02:00 (CEST)
- Postal codes: 99439
- Dialling codes: 036451
- Vehicle registration: AP

Rohrbach (German pronunciation: [ˈʁoːɐ̯bax]) is a village and a former municipality in the Weimarer Land district of Thuringia, Germany. Since 1 January 2019, it is part of the municipality Ilmtal-Weinstraße.
