= Krautheim, Thuringia =

Krautheim
- Part of Am Ettersberg
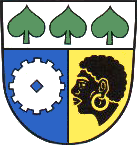
- Coat of arms
- Interactive map of Krautheim
- Location within Germany Location within Thuringia
- Coordinates: 51°5′17″N 11°18′18″E
- Country: Germany
- State: Thuringia
- District: Weimarer Land
- Town: Am Ettersberg

Area
  - Total: 10.24 km^{2} (3.95 sq mi)
- Elevation: 180 m (590 ft)

Population (2017-12-31)
  - Total: 499
  - Density: 48.7/km^{2} (126/sq mi)
- Time zone: UTC+01:00 (CET)
  - Summer (DST): UTC+02:00 (CEST)
- Postal codes: 99439
- Dialling codes: 036451
- Vehicle registration: AP

Krautheim (German pronunciation: [ˈkʁaʊthaɪm]) is a village and a former municipality in the Weimarer Land district of Thuringia, Germany. Since 1 January 2019, it is part of the municipality Am Ettersberg.
