= Heichelheim =

- Ortsteil of Am Ettersberg
- Interactive map of Heichelheim
- Location within Germany Location within Thuringia
- Coordinates: 51°2′32″N 11°18′45″E
- Country: Germany
- State: Thuringia
- District: Weimarer Land
- Municipality: Am Ettersberg

Area
  - Total: 3.52 km^{2} (1.36 sq mi)
- Elevation: 255 m (837 ft)

Population (2017-12-31)
  - Total: 304
  - Density: 86.4/km^{2} (224/sq mi)
- Time zone: UTC+01:00 (CET)
  - Summer (DST): UTC+02:00 (CEST)
- Postal codes: 99439
- Dialling codes: 03643
- Vehicle registration: AP

Heichelheim (German pronunciation: [ˈhaɪçl̩haɪm]) is a village and a former municipality in the Weimarer Land district of Thuringia, Germany. Since 1 January 2019, it is part of the municipality Am Ettersberg.
