= Sachsenhausen, Thuringia =

Sachsenhausen
- Ortsteil of Am Ettersberg
- Interactive map of Sachsenhausen
- Location within Germany Location within Thuringia
- Coordinates: 51°2′43″N 11°22′2″E
- Country: Germany
- State: Thuringia
- District: Weimarer Land
- Municipality: Am Ettersberg

Area
  - Total: 4.86 km^{2} (1.88 sq mi)
- Elevation: 250 m (820 ft)

Population (2017-12-31)
  - Total: 358
  - Density: 73.7/km^{2} (191/sq mi)
- Time zone: UTC+01:00 (CET)
  - Summer (DST): UTC+02:00 (CEST)
- Postal codes: 99439
- Dialling codes: 03643
- Vehicle registration: AP
- Website: www.sachsenhausen-in-thueringen.de

Sachsenhausen (German pronunciation: [zaksn̩ˈhaʊzn̩]) is a village and a former municipality in the Weimarer Land district of Thuringia, Germany. Since 1 January 2019, it is part of the municipality Am Ettersberg.
