= Buttelstedt =

- Ortsteil of Am Ettersberg
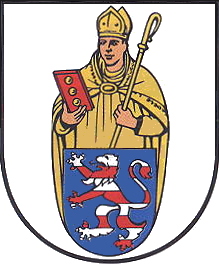
- Coat of arms
- Interactive map of Buttelstedt
- Location within Germany Location within Thuringia
- Coordinates: 51°4′27″N 11°20′28″E
- Country: Germany
- State: Thuringia
- District: Weimarer Land
- Municipality: Am Ettersberg

Area
  - Total: 18.85 km^{2} (7.28 sq mi)
- Elevation: 200 m (660 ft)

Population (2017-12-31)
  - Total: 1,317
  - Density: 69.87/km^{2} (181.0/sq mi)
- Time zone: UTC+01:00 (CET)
  - Summer (DST): UTC+02:00 (CEST)
- Postal codes: 99439
- Dialling codes: 036451
- Vehicle registration: AP
- Website: www.buttelstedt.de

Buttelstedt (German pronunciation: [ˈbʊtl̩ʃtɛt]) is a town and a former municipality in the Weimarer Land district, in Thuringia, Germany. It is situated 11 km north of Weimar. Since 1 January 2019, it is part of the municipality Am Ettersberg.

== History ==
Within the German Empire (1871-1918), Buttelstedt was part of the Grand Duchy of Saxe-Weimar-Eisenach.

== Notable people from Buttelstedt ==
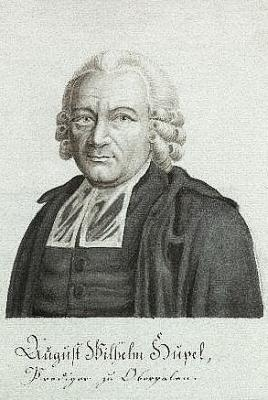
August Wilhelm Hupel

- August Wilhelm Hupel (1737-1819), publicist, estophile and linguist
- Johann Friedrich Fasch (1688-1758), baroque musician and composer
- Johann Ludwig Krebs (1713-1780), composer
