= Ettersburg =

- Municipality
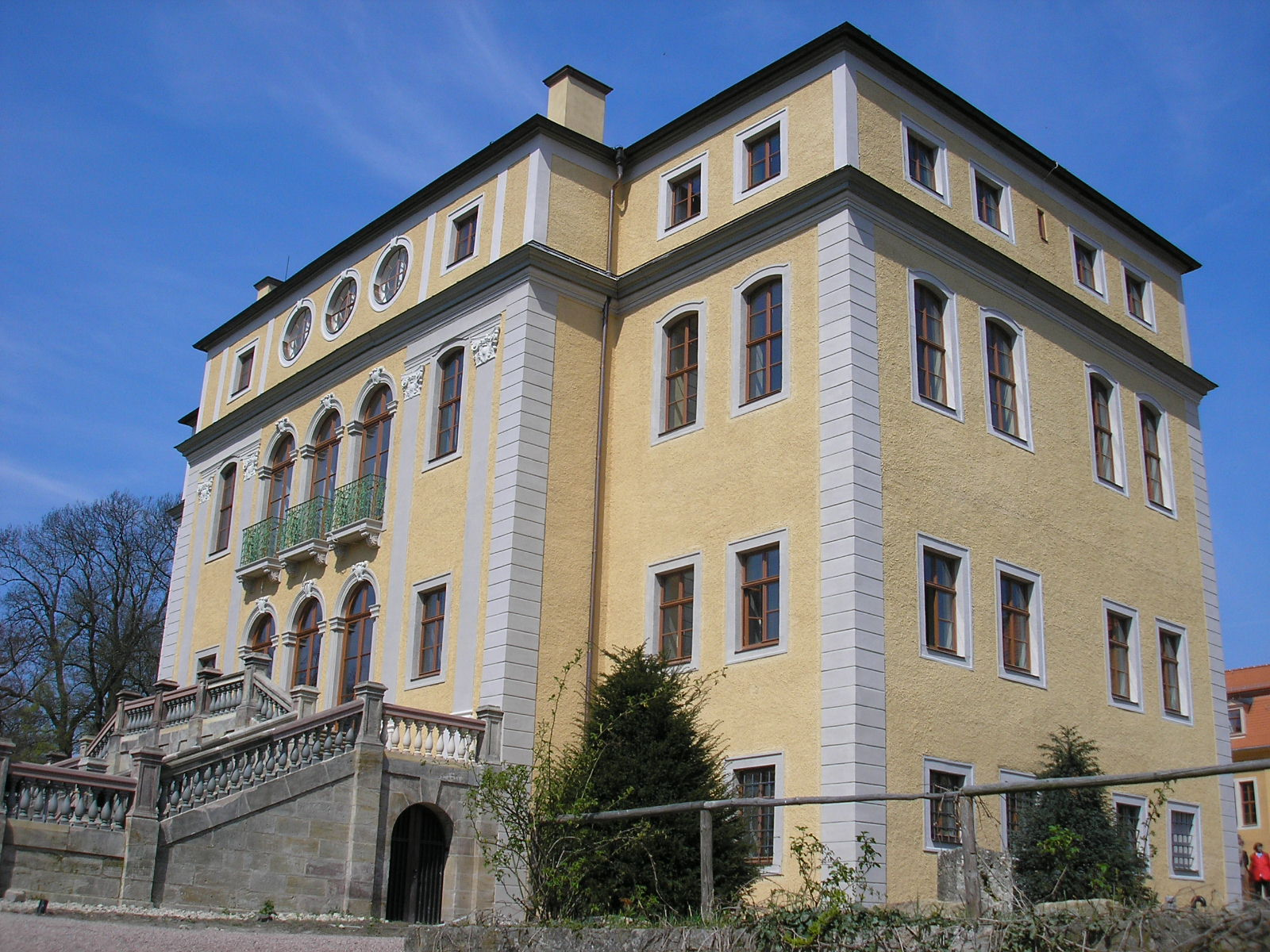
- Ettersburg Castle

- Coat of arms

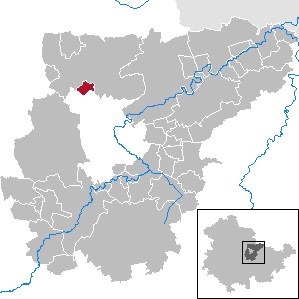
- Location of Ettersburg within Weimarer Land district
- Interactive map of Ettersburg
- Location within Germany Location within Thuringia
- Coordinates: 51°2′0″N 11°16′47″E
- Country: Germany
- State: Thuringia
- District: Weimarer Land

Government
  - Mayor (2022–28): Jens Enderlein

Area
  - Total: 2.92 km^{2} (1.13 sq mi)
- Elevation: 322 m (1,056 ft)

Population (2025-12-31)
  - Total: 733
  - Density: 251/km^{2} (650/sq mi)
- Time zone: UTC+01:00 (CET)
  - Summer (DST): UTC+02:00 (CEST)
- Postal codes: 99439
- Dialling codes: 03643
- Vehicle registration: AP

Ettersburg is a municipality in the Weimarer Land district of Thuringia, Germany.

== Notable people ==
- Karl Heinrich Emil Koch (1809–1879), botanist, was born in Ettersburg.
