= Großobringen =

- Ortsteil of Am Ettersberg
- Interactive map of Großobringen
- Location within Germany Location within Thuringia
- Coordinates: 51°1′53″N 11°20′8″E
- Country: Germany
- State: Thuringia
- District: Weimarer Land
- Municipality: Am Ettersberg

Area
  - Total: 7.65 km^{2} (2.95 sq mi)
- Elevation: 288 m (945 ft)

Population (2017-12-31)
  - Total: 898
  - Density: 117/km^{2} (304/sq mi)
- Time zone: UTC+01:00 (CET)
  - Summer (DST): UTC+02:00 (CEST)
- Postal codes: 99439
- Dialling codes: 03643
- Vehicle registration: AP

Großobringen (German pronunciation: [ɡʁoːsˈʔoːbʁɪŋən], lit. 'Big Obringen', in contrast to "Little Obringen") is a village and a former municipality in the Weimarer Land district of Thuringia, Germany. Since 1 January 2019, it is part of the municipality Am Ettersberg.
