= Karl Koch (botanist) =

German botanist

Karl Heinrich Emil Koch
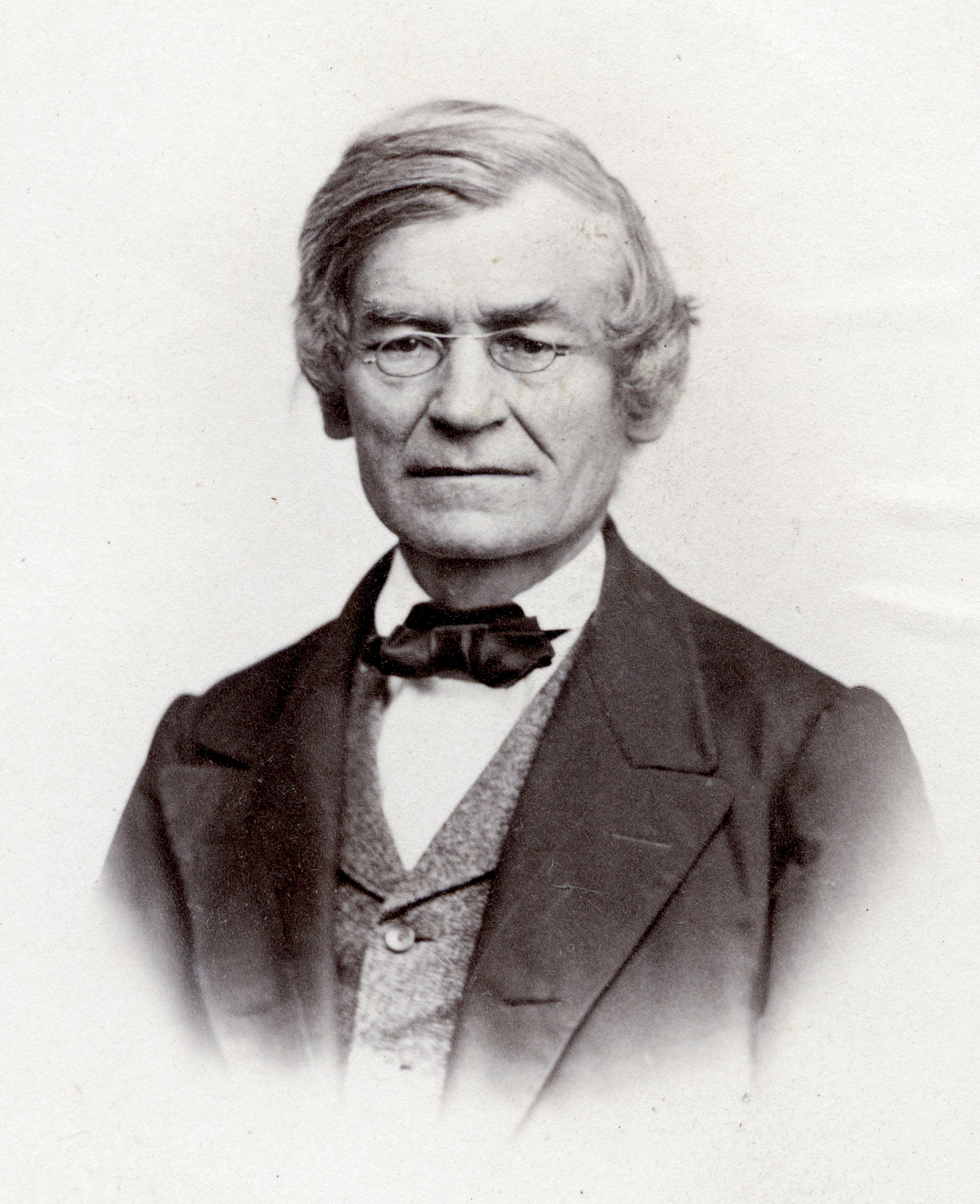
- Born: 6 June 1809; Ettersburg, Germany
- Died: 25 May 1879 (aged 69); Berlin, Germany
- Education: University of Jena, University of Würzburg
- Known for: Wochenschrift für Gartnerei und Pflanzenkunde (Weekly Journal for Horticulture and Botany, 1858–72)
- Scientific career
- Fields: Botany
- Institutions: University of Jena, University of Berlin
- Author abbrev. (botany): K.Koch

Karl Heinrich Emil Koch (6 June 1809 – 25 May 1879) was a German botanist. He is best known for his botanical explorations in the Caucasus region, including northeast Turkey. Most of his collections have today been lost. He is also known as the first professional horticultural officer in Germany. The standard author abbreviation K.Koch is used to indicate this person as the author when citing a botanical name.

== Biography ==
He was born in Ettersburg near Weimar, Germany. He studied at the universities of Jena and Würzburg and taught, as privatdocent, at the University of Jena beginning 1834. He became an associate professor in 1836. He undertook a journey of research into southern Russia in 1836–38, and a second in 1843–44. The fruit of this second trip, in which he also visited Asia Minor, Great Armenia, the Caspian Sea, and the Caucasus Mountains, was his "Wanderungen im Oriente, während der Jahre 1843 und 1844" (1846).

After his second journey, he settled at the University of Berlin in 1847, where he was later appointed assistant professor. He was at the Berlin botanical gardens beginning in 1849. He became general secretary of the Berlin Horticultural Society (Verein zur Beförderung des Gartenbau, a Prussian state institution), in which capacity he published "Wochenschrift für Gartnerei und Pflanzenkunde" (1858–72). In 1859, he was appointed professor of the Agricultural High School in Berlin. He died in Berlin.

== Writings ==
Besides the travel book already mentioned, Koch wrote "Reise durch Russland nach dem kaukasischen Isthmus" (Trip through Russia and the Caucasian isthmus, Stuttgart, 1842–43), "Fährtenabdrücke im bunten Sandstein" (with Ernst Erhard Schmid, 1841), "Hortus dendrologicus" (Berlin, 1853–54), "Dendrologie" (Erlangen, 1869–72), and other works.
