= Eight Short Preludes and Fugues =

Collection of works for keyboard and pedal

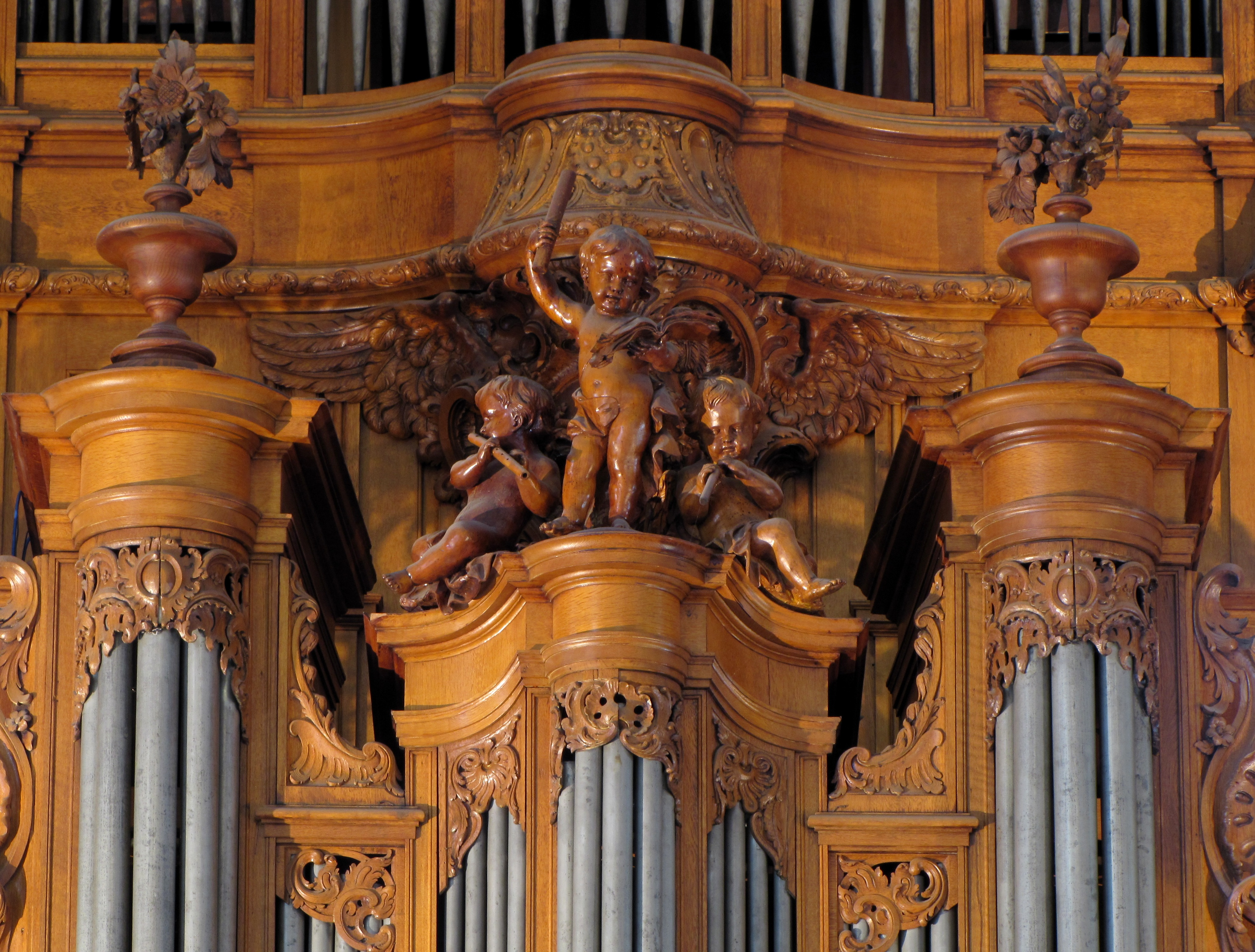
The 1741 organ of Johann Andreas Silbermann in St Thomas' Church, Strasbourg (Note: Wolfgang Amadeus Mozart played on the organ during his journey to Paris in 1777–1778. The polymath Albert Schweitzer programmed organ recitals there to raise funds for his hospital work in Africa.)

The Eight Short Preludes and Fugues (also Eight Little Preludes and Fugues), BWV 553–560, are a collection of works for keyboard and pedal formerly attributed to Johann Sebastian Bach. They are now believed to have been composed by one of Bach's pupils, possibly Johann Tobias Krebs or his son Johann Ludwig Krebs, or by the Bohemian composer Johann Caspar Ferdinand Fischer.

== History and attribution ==
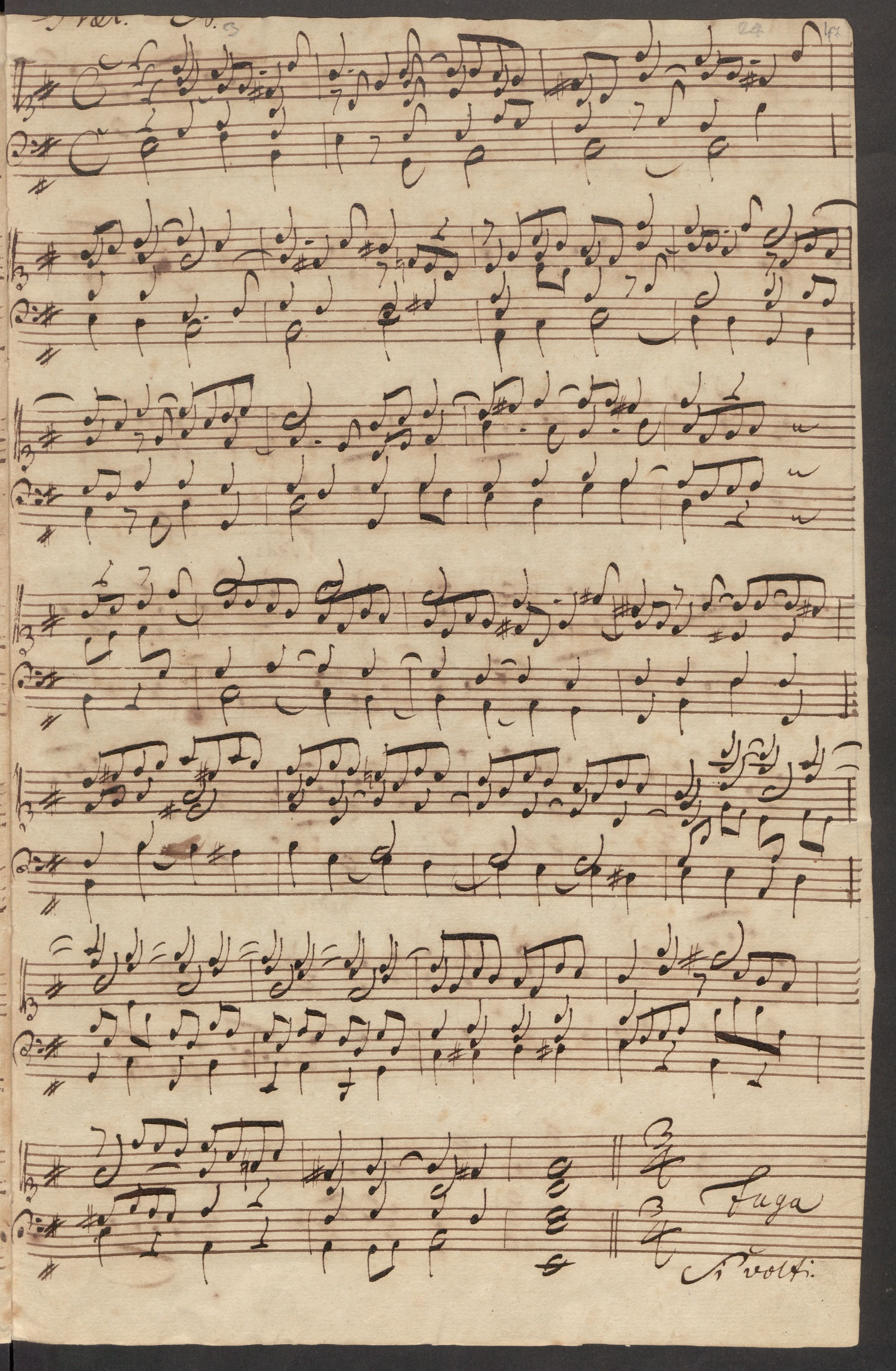
Mid-eighteenth century manuscript copy of Prelude, BWV 555 in the durezza style of Girolamo Frescobaldi

While originally attributed to Bach, scientific examination of the extant manuscripts by Alfred Dürr in 1987 and subsequent stylistic analysis of the score by Peter Williams have suggested that the eight preludes and fugues might have been composed by one of his pupils, Johann Ludwig Krebs. As Williams explains, whoever the composer was, the works show an ability to compose in diverse ways—the toccata, the Italian concerto, the galant style, the fughetta and the durezze style with slow suspensions, favoured by Girolamo Frescobaldi. It has not yet been possible to date the compositions, but Williams writes: "Though frequently charming and melodious, they could hardly have been written by J. S. Bach for his pupils since their 'standard of counterpoint and general musicianship' does not fit the period in question, nor does the scarcity of copies suggest they were much used, [...] even as part of a bigger compendium. Nevertheless, the pieces do amount to a fine book for learners, teaching whether or how to add pedal, use a second manual, and register according to so-called key characteristics."

Various possible composers have been suggested for these little preludes and fugues, including Johann Ludwig Krebs, Johann Tobias Krebs, Wilhelm Friedemann Bach, Franz Anton Maichelbeck and Johann Caspar Simon. Prior to Dürr's scientific research on manuscripts, the 19th-century scholar Philipp Spitta had judged that the works bore the "stamp of commanding mastery"; and Sir George Grove, another 19th-century scholar, declared that "on stylistic grounds neither [Johann Tobias nor Johann Ludwig] seems likely." Even though in 1952 the Bach scholar Walter Emery wrote about the works that "there seems no reason why they should not have been written about 1730–50 by some minor composer in central Germany, whether or not he was a pupil of Bach's," Williams thinks that the likely composer—the "eminence grise" as he puts it—is most probably the composer Johann Caspar Ferdinand Fischer from Bohemia. As justification Williams describes the form of the preludes and fugues:

Such modest and single-minded preludes, modest fugues with exposition, episode and final entries, a charming and coherent handling of the keys and cadences: these are closer to Fischer's idiom than to any northern repertories, and could reflect his wide and lasting influence on organists of the time. Even in the longest Fugue, No. 3, there is little modulation beyond what one finds in Fischer's succinct little essays, and any 'updating' of his idiom discerned in BWV 553–560 – binary form, post-Vivaldian patterns, post-Bach melodies, further episodes in some fugues, sometimes unclear handling of part-writing – could be that of an admirer of his in 1750 or so.

== Preludes and fugues ==
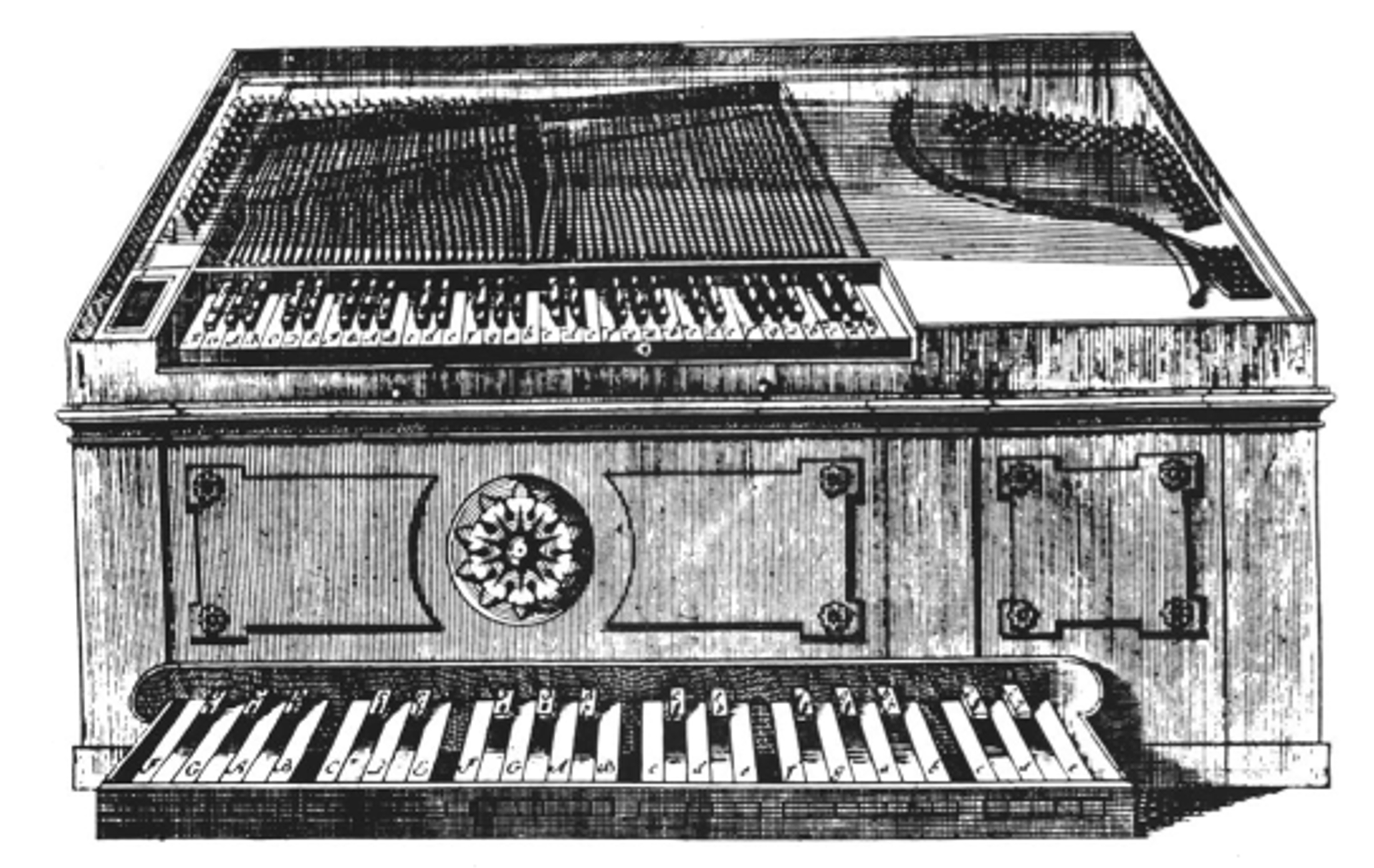
Pedal clavichord, engraving, P. Verscheure Reynvaan, 1795

These pieces came to be played often on the organ in the 19th and 20th centuries, and were especially useful as teaching pieces for beginners. Subsequent scholarship has suggested that this collection was conceived specifically for the pedal clavichord, thereby making the stylistic claim of inauthenticity far less tenable. Several elements of the pieces, including the rolling of large chords, octave doublings and repeated notes, and the patterns of movement of the fingers and feet, the rhythm, and overall texture are idiomatic on the clavichord but make little sense on the organ. In 1998 Harald Vogel recorded the collection on a pedal clavichord.

The eight preludes and fugues are:

- Prelude and Fugue in C major (BWV 553)

BWV 553
All performed by Robert Köbler on a Silbermann organ, in the village church of Großhartmannsdorf, Saxony

Discounted as being a form of Corelli allemande, the prelude combines features of an Italian concerto or an organ praeludium. The brief fugue is more substantial than a fughetta; the style of the two musical motifs is similar to that of Pachelbel and Fischer.

- Prelude and Fugue in D minor (BWV 554)

BWV 554

The compact prelude has an ABA structure, where the A section is dominated by the middle concertante B segment. Both the prelude and fugue are reminiscent of the first and last lines of the Lutheran chorale Jesu, meine Freude.

- Prelude and Fugue in E minor (BWV 555)

BWV 555

The prelude of BWV 555 is in the durezza style of suspended dissonances, typified by the ricercars of Frescobaldi; the model is adapted from the traditions of organ versets in Southern Germany, rather than string trio sonatas. Peter Williams considers that the fugue is probably the best in the collection "with stretto, inversus, and a counterpoint typical of earlier treatments of the descending chromatic fourth."

- Prelude and Fugue in F major (BWV 556)

BWV 556

In the four-movement Pastorella, BWV 590 by Bach, the prelude of BWV 556 is vaguely similar to the third movement, but does not match Bach's musicianship. According to Williams, it seems like "an exercise in simple rising sequences, with a basso-continuo pedal part", showing the Italianate influence of Antonio Soler rather than Domenico Scarlatti. The fugue could have been composed anywhere in Germany: its musical figures have a polyphonic style like Pachelbel's Magnificats.

- Prelude and Fugue in G major (BWV 557)

BWV 557

The prelude is a "miniature toccata" with freely-composed improvisatory passages. It reflects the musical influence of Johann Kuhnau, Friedrich Erhard Niedt, Johann Mattheson, Bach and Fischer. The subject of the fugue is syncopated, so, as in the Well-Tempered Clavier, modulations before or after stretto entries are easily accomplished.

- Prelude and Fugue in G minor (BWV 558)

BWV 558

In 1931, it was suggested by the musicologist Fritz Dietrich that the prelude could technically be regarded as an "Italian courante", but, as Williams points out, that runs counter to the ABAB form and the change of harmony in every bar. The conventional formulaic cadences and simple one-bar sequences over a basso continuo seem like a composer "consciously creating a series of samples". The subject of the fugue is composed of three separate motifs, all of which can be found in canzonas and ricercars. The 19th-century Bach scholar Philipp Spitta praised the fugue, particularly its modulations. Williams has suggested that "perhaps the imaginative penultimate bar was inspired by J. S. Bach".

- Prelude and Fugue in A minor (BWV 559)

BWV 559

The little Prelude and Fugue in A minor, BWV 559 lies in the shadows of Bach's celebrated Prelude and Fugue in A minor, BWV 543. The demisemiquaver passagework of the little prelude is typical of toccata organ writing in Southern Germany, although they can also be found in Dieterich Buxtehude's works; the use of pedal points in BWV 559 indicate techniques of organ writing already heard in BWV 543. Like the fugue in BWV 543, the second half of the subject of the fugue in BWV 559 is ornamented; otherwise, however, it is composed on a quite different scale, being more like the "verset-fughettas" of Fischer.

- Prelude and Fugue in B-flat major (BWV 560)

BWV 560

According to Williams, the musical style of the prelude is reflected in contemporary oboe concertos of the 1730s; while the fugue was probably composed after 1740 and shows the influence of Handel's Concerti grossi.

== Selected recordings ==
Organ

- Marie-Claire Alain, reissue, 2011, Erato Records.
- Ton Koopman, Garrels organ, Groote Kerk, Maassluis, 1990, Novalis.
- Simon Preston, 1996, Decca Records.
- Peter Hurford, recording on period German organs, 1995, Decca Records.
- Kevin Bowyer, Skt. Hans Kirke, Odense, 1991, Nimbus Records.
- John Keys, 2012, ASIN: B0087WIV1S.
- Hans Fagius, 2007, BIS Records.
- Hans Helmut Tillmanns, on the Weimbs organ in Widdersdorf, Cologne, 2003, Danacord, DACOCD 608.
- Robert Köbler, Organ Works on Silbermann Organs, Vol. 7, 1998 (reissue), Berlin Classics.
- Gerhard Weinberger, Carl Christian Hoffmann Organ, St. Marien, Mechterstädt, 2008, CPO 777 363-2.
- Hans Vollenweider, Reformierte Kirche, Schönenberg, Zürich, 1997, Tudor.
- Wolfgang Stockmeier, Kirche Maria Himmelfahrt, Lorup, reissue, 2007, Membran.
- Piet Kee, organ of St Bavo in Haarlem, 1992, Chandos, CHAN0527.
- Bernard Foccroulle, 2007, Ricercar Records.
- E. Power Biggs, ca. 1957, Columbia ML 5078. Recorded on 8 different historic organs in Northern Europe (Netherlands, Germany)

Pedal clavichord

- Harald Vogel, Seattle, 2000, Loft Recordings.

Mandolin

- Mark Delisle, 2018, ASIN: B07K2MBWXS.

Piano

- Martin Stadtfeld, arranged by Dmitry Kabalevsky, 2010, Sony Records, 9761754.

Brass ensemble

- James Barnes, BWV 554, 2011, Mark Records.

== Notes and references ==
Notes

Sources

- Dürr, Alfred, ed. (1987). Eight Short Preludes and Fugues BWV 553–560: formerly ascribed to Johann Sebastian Bach (in German and English). Kassel: Bärenreiter. ISMN 9790006480098. BA 6497.
- Speerstra, Joel (2004), Bach and the Pedal Clavichord: an Organist's Guide, University of Rochester Press, ISBN 1-58046-135-2
- Williams, Peter (2003), The Organ Music of J. S. Bach (2nd ed.), Cambridge University Press, pp. 141–144, ISBN 0-521-89115-9
