= Clavichord =

Musical instrument

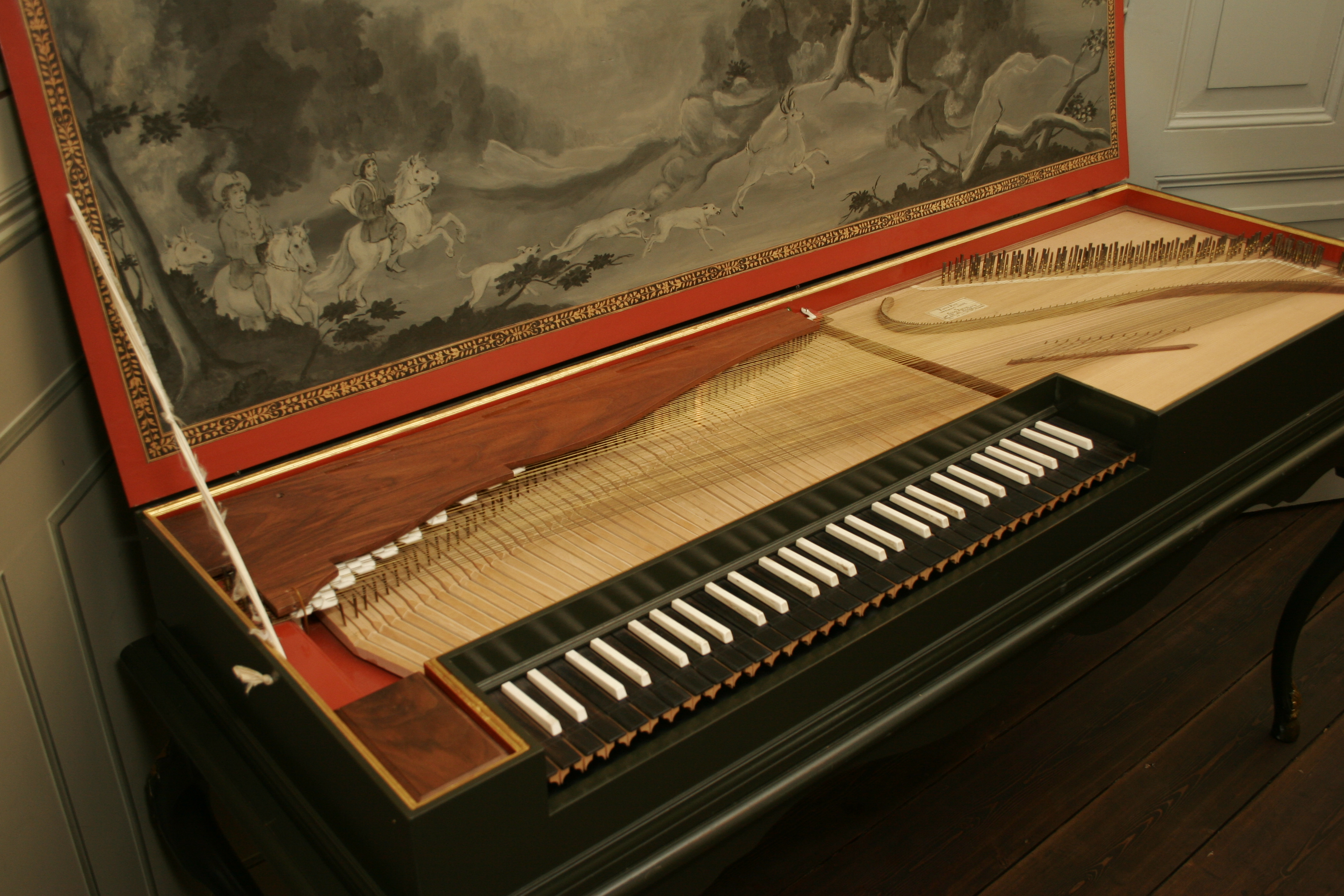
- 1977 unfretted clavichord by Keith Hill

Keyboard instrument
- Other names: Clarichord
- Hornbostel–Sachs classification: 314.122-4-8 (Simple chordophone with keyboard sounded by tangents)
- Developed: c. 14th century

The clavichord is a stringed rectangular keyboard instrument that was used largely in the Late Middle Ages, through the Renaissance, Baroque and Classical eras. Historically, it was mostly used as a practice instrument and as an aid to composition, not being loud enough for larger performances. The clavichord produces sound by striking brass or iron strings with small metal blades called tangents. Vibrations are transmitted through the bridge(s) to the soundboard.

== Etymology ==
The name is derived from the Latin word clavis, meaning "key" (associated with more common clavus, meaning "nail, rod, etc.") and chorda (from Greek χορδή) meaning "string, especially of a musical instrument". An analogous name is used in other European languages (It. clavicordio, clavicordo; Fr. clavicorde; Germ. Klavichord; Lat. clavicordium; Port. clavicórdio; Sp. clavicordio). Many languages also have another name derived from Latin manus, meaning "hand" (It. manicordo; Fr. manicorde, manicordion; Sp. manicordio, manucordio). Other names refer to the monochord-like nature of a fully fretted clavichord (It. monacordo or monocordo; Sp. monacordio). Italian also used sordino, a reference to its quiet sound (sordino usually designates a mute).

== History and use ==
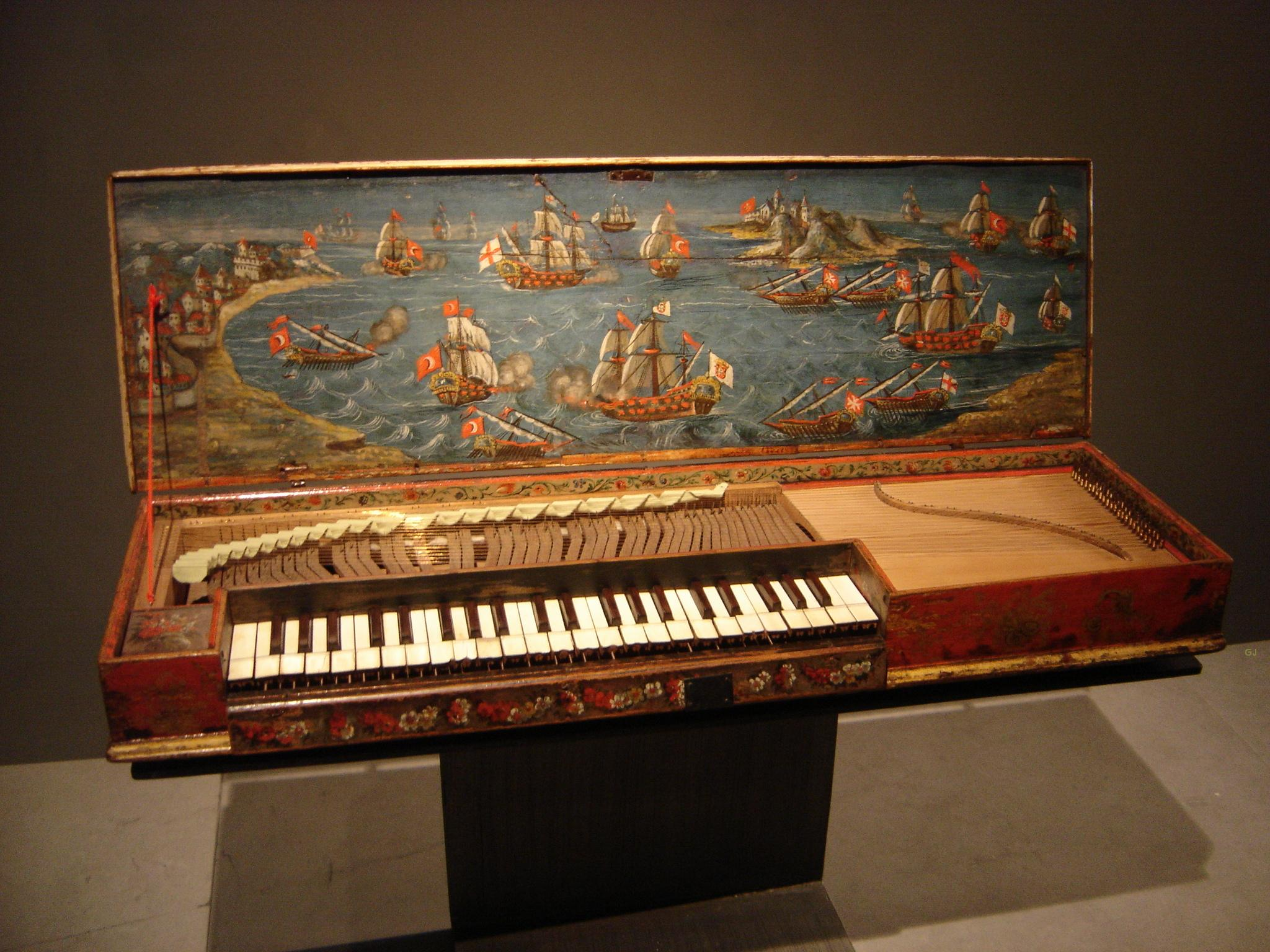
The "Lépante" fretted clavichord, Musée de la Musique, Paris

1763 clavichord by Johann Adolph Hass in the Russell Collection, Edinburgh

The clavichord was likely invented in the fourteenth century at the earliest, and 1404 at the latest. The first unambiguous reference to the clavichord is generally considered to be the 1404 German poem "Der Minne Regel", which mentions the terms clavicimbalum (a term used mainly for the harpsichord) and clavichordium, designating them as the best instruments to accompany melodies.

One of the earliest references to the clavichord in England occurs in the privy-purse expenses of Elizabeth of York, queen of Henry VII, in an entry dated August 1502:

Item. The same day, Hugh Denys for money by him delivered to a stranger that gave the queen a payre of clavycordes. In crowns form his reward iiii libres.

The clavichord was very popular from the 16th century to the 18th century, but mainly flourished in German-speaking lands, Scandinavia, and the Iberian Peninsula in the latter part of this period. It had fallen out of use by 1850. In the late 1890s, Arnold Dolmetsch revived clavichord construction and Violet Gordon-Woodhouse, among others, helped to popularize the instrument. Although most of the instruments built before the 1730s were small (four octaves, four feet long), the latest instruments were built up to seven feet long with a six octave range.

It was a preferred instrument in the 18th century due to its unique expressive features, size, elegance, and affordability. Due to its lower cost compared to other instruments, the clavichord was accessible, making it the first choice for individuals who wanted to learn the keyboard. Composers such as Wolfgang Amadeus Mozart (1756–1791), used to bring the clavichord with them on their travels to practice.

During the Mozart family's visit to Augsburg, they had the chance to visit the outstanding German keyboard instruments maker, Johann Andreas Stein (1728–1792), and purchased a clavichord from him. In a letter to his friend, Leopold Mozart (1719–1787) described it as "A pretty little keyboard instrument, which does us good service for practicing on during our travels."

Until electronic amplification in the twentieth century, it was impossible to use the quiet clavichord in anything but a small room. However, during the clavichord's heyday, evenings of music-making in the home formed the largest part of people's musical experiences. In the home the clavichord was the ideal instrument for solo keyboard music and instrumental accompaniment.Organists also were known to practice in their homes on pedal clavichords.

Today clavichords are played primarily by Renaissance, Baroque, and Classical music enthusiasts. They attract many interested buyers, and are manufactured worldwide. There are now numerous clavichord societies around the world, and some 400 recordings of the instrument have been made in the past 70 years. Leading modern exponents of the instrument have included Christopher Hogwood and Thurston Dart.

=== Modern music ===
The clavichord has also gained attention in other genres of music, in the form of the Clavinet, which is a solid body electric clavichord with magnetic pickups that plug into an amp. Stevie Wonder uses a Clavinet in many of his songs, such as "Superstition" and "Higher Ground". A Clavinet played through an instrument amplifier with guitar effect pedals is often associated with funky, disco-infused 1970s rock.

Guy Sigsworth has played clavichord in a modern setting with Björk, notably on the studio recording of "All Is Full of Love". Björk also made extensive use of and even played the instrument herself on the song "My Juvenile" of her 2007 album Volta.

Tori Amos uses the instrument on "Little Amsterdam" from the album Boys for Pele and on the song "Smokey Joe" from her 2007 album American Doll Posse. Amos also featured her use of the Clavinet on her 2004 recording "Not David Bowie", released as part of her 2006 box set, A Piano: The Collection.

In 1976 Oscar Peterson played (with Joe Pass on acoustic guitar) songs from Porgy And Bess on the clavichord. Keith Jarrett also recorded an album titled Book of Ways (1986) in which he plays a series of clavichord improvisations. The Beatles' "For No One" (1966) features Paul McCartney playing the clavichord. Rick Wakeman plays the Clavinet in the track "The Battle" from the album Journey to the Centre of the Earth.

== Structure and action ==
Schematic diagram of clavichord mechanism: A/B. Keys. 1A/1B. Tangents. 2A/2B. Keylevers. 3. String. 4. Soundboard. 5. Bridge-pin, next to hitch-pin. 6. Damping felt, next to tuning peg. (Note that this sketch is a simplification. In the actual instrument, the strings run perpendicular to the keylevers. In other words, the strings run lengthwise in the instrument.)

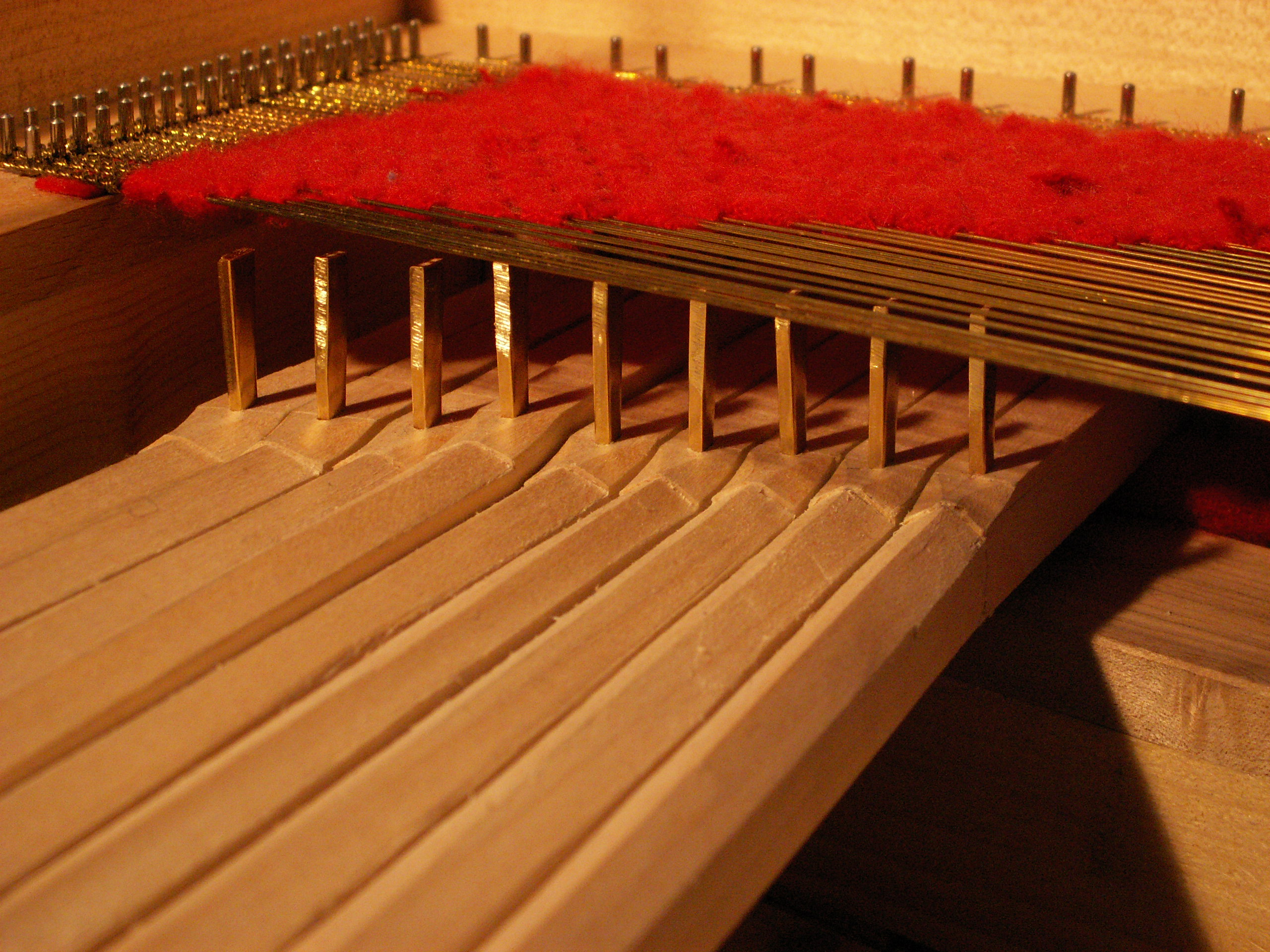
Tangents

In the clavichord, strings run transversely from the hitchpin rail at the left-hand end to tuning pegs on the right. Towards the right end they pass over a curved wooden bridge. The action is simple, with the keys being levers with a small brass tangent, a small piece of metal similar in shape and size to the head of a flat-bladed screwdriver, at the far end. The strings, which are usually of brass, or else a combination of brass and iron, are usually arranged in pairs, like a lute or mandolin. When the key is pressed, the tangent strikes the strings above, causing them to sound in a similar fashion to the hammering technique on a guitar. Unlike in a piano action, the tangent does not rebound from the string; rather, it stays in contact with the string as long as the key is held, acting as both the nut and as the initiator of sound. The volume of the note can be changed by striking harder or softer, and the pitch can also be affected by varying the force of the tangent against the string (known as Bebung). When the key is released, the tangent loses contact with the string and the vibration of the string is silenced by strips of damping cloth.

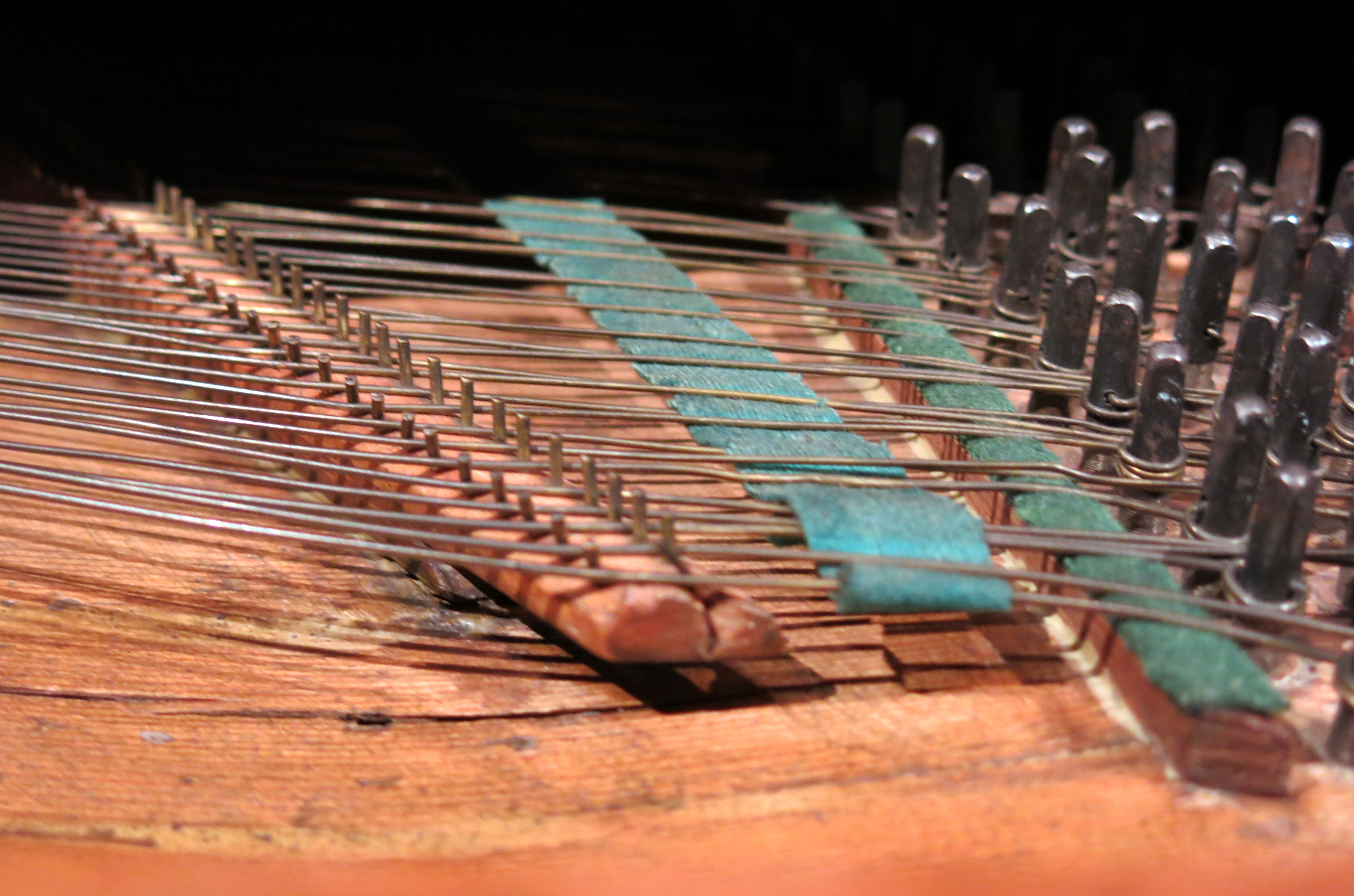
Detail of the clavichord at Museu de la Música de Barcelona

The action of the clavichord is unique among all keyboard instruments in that one part of the action simultaneously initiates the sound vibration while at the same time defining the endpoint of the vibrating string, and thus its pitch. Because of this intimate contact between the player's hand and the production of sound, the clavichord has been referred to as the most intimate of keyboard instruments. Despite its many (serious) limitations, including extremely low volume, it has considerable expressive power, the player being able to control attack, duration, and volume, and even provide certain subtle effects of swelling of tone and a type of vibrato unique to the clavichord.

== Fretting ==
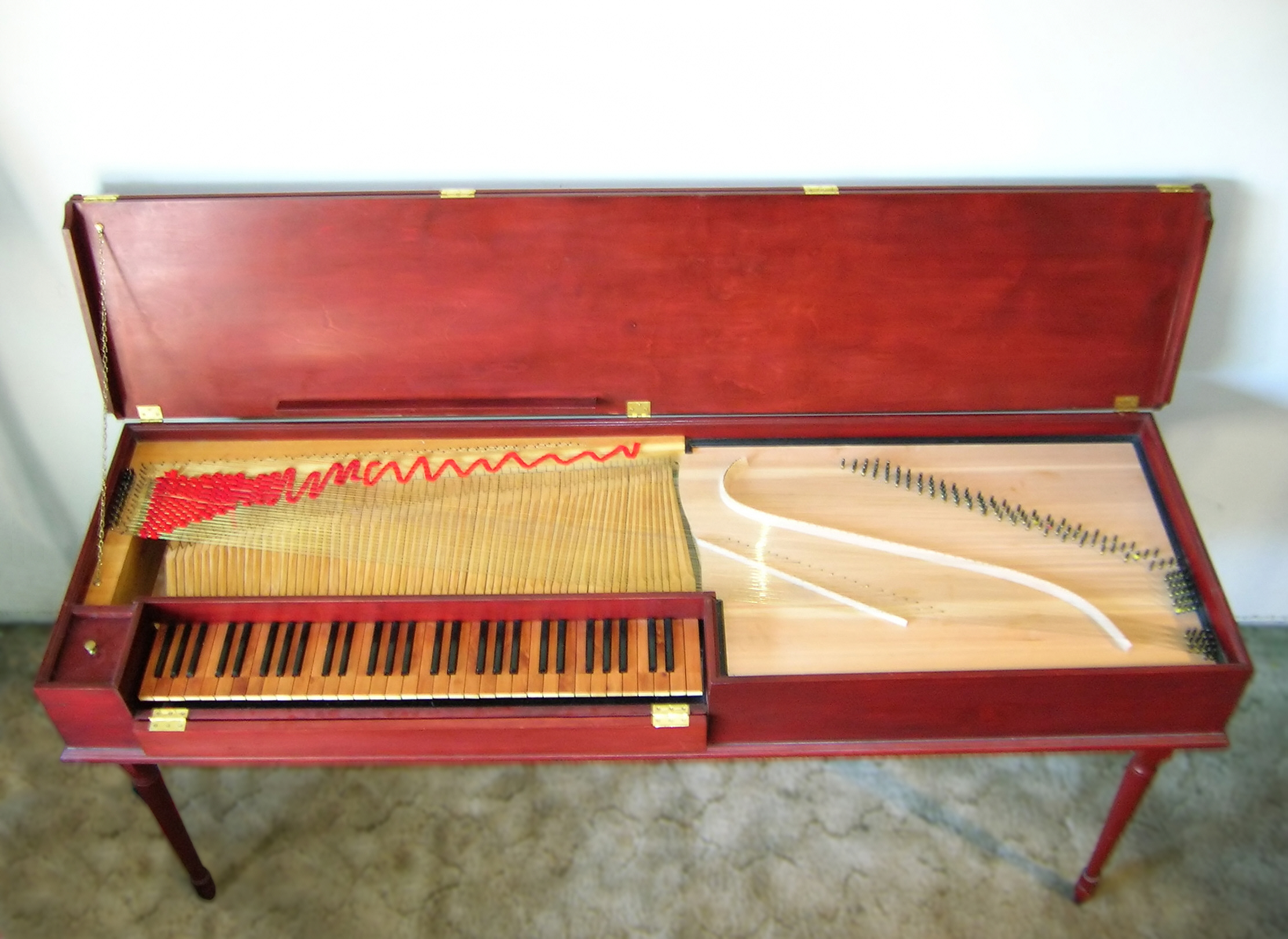
Large five-octave unfretted clavichord by Paul Maurici, after J.A. Hass

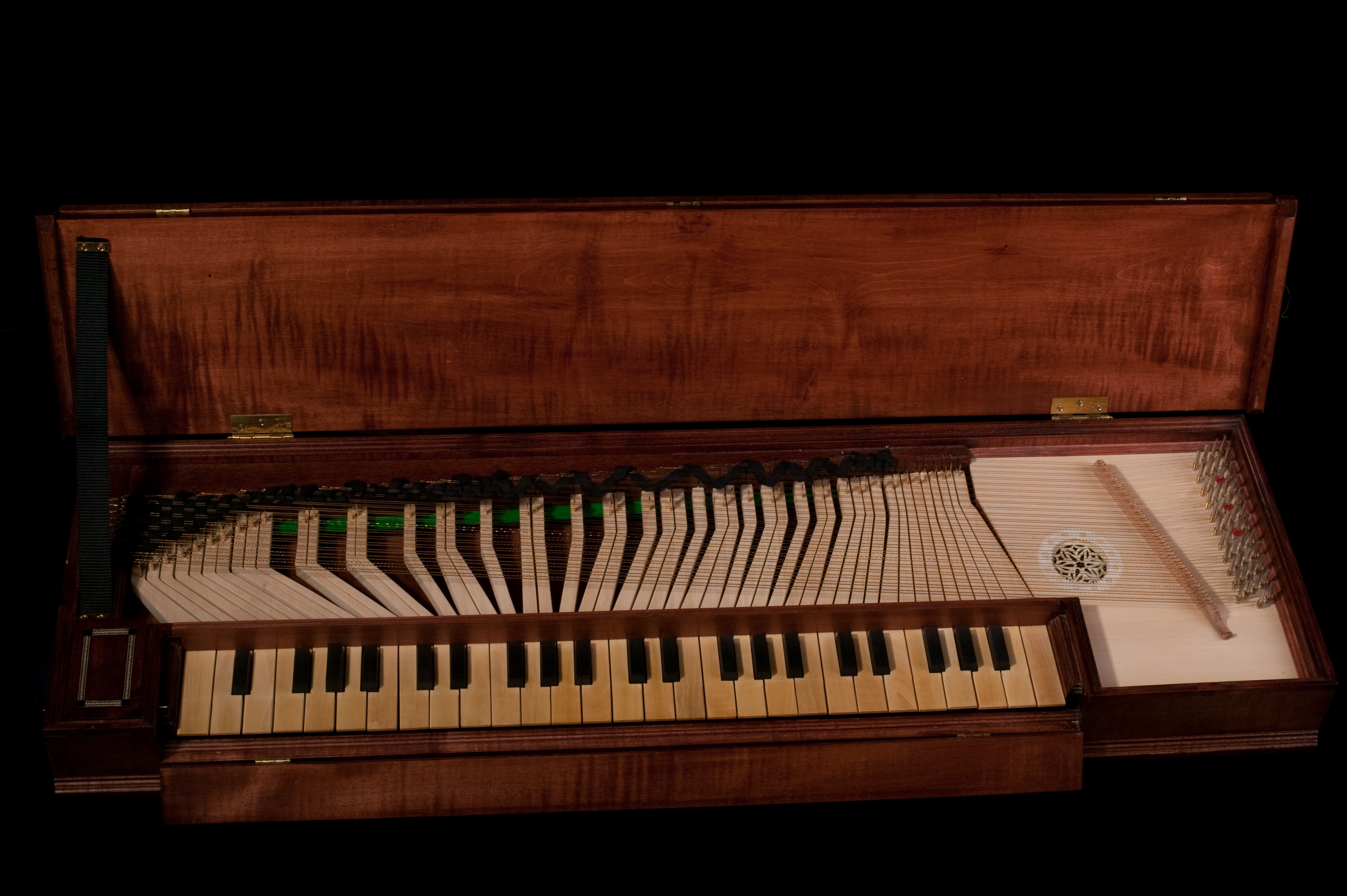
Fretted clavichord, copy of an unsigned instrument conserved in Namur, Belgium. The way the same string pair is used for several notes is clearly visible in the full size image.

Since the string vibrates from the bridge only as far as the tangent, multiple keys with multiple tangents can be assigned to the same string. This is called fretting. Early clavichords frequently had many notes played on each string, even going so far as the keyed monochord—an instrument with only one string—though most clavichords were triple- or double-fretted. Since only one note can be played at a time on each string, the fretting pattern is generally chosen so that notes rarely heard together (such as C and C♯) share a string pair. The advantages of this system compared with unfretted instruments (see below) include relative ease of tuning (with around half as many strings to keep in tune), greater volume (though still not really enough for use in chamber music), and a clearer, more direct sound. Among the disadvantages: temperament could not be re-set without bending the tangents; and playing required a further refinement of touch, since notes sharing a single string played in quick succession had to be slightly separated to avoid a disagreeable deadening of the sound, potentially disturbing a legato line.

Some clavichords have been built with a single pair of strings for each note. The first known reference to one was by Johann Speth in 1693 and the earliest such extant signed and dated clavichord was built in 1716 by Johann Michael Heinitz. Such instruments are referred to as unfretted whereas instruments using the same strings for several notes are called fretted. Among the advantages to unfretted instruments are flexibility in tuning (the temperament can be easily altered) and the ability to play any music exactly as written without concern for "bad" notes. Disadvantages include a smaller volume, even though many or most unfretted instruments tend to be significantly larger than fretted instruments; and many more strings to keep in tune. Unfretted instruments tend to have a sweeter, less incisive tone due to the greater load on the bridge resulting from the greater number of strings, though the large, late (early 19th century) Swedish clavichords tend to be the loudest of any of the historic clavichords.

== Pedal clavichord ==
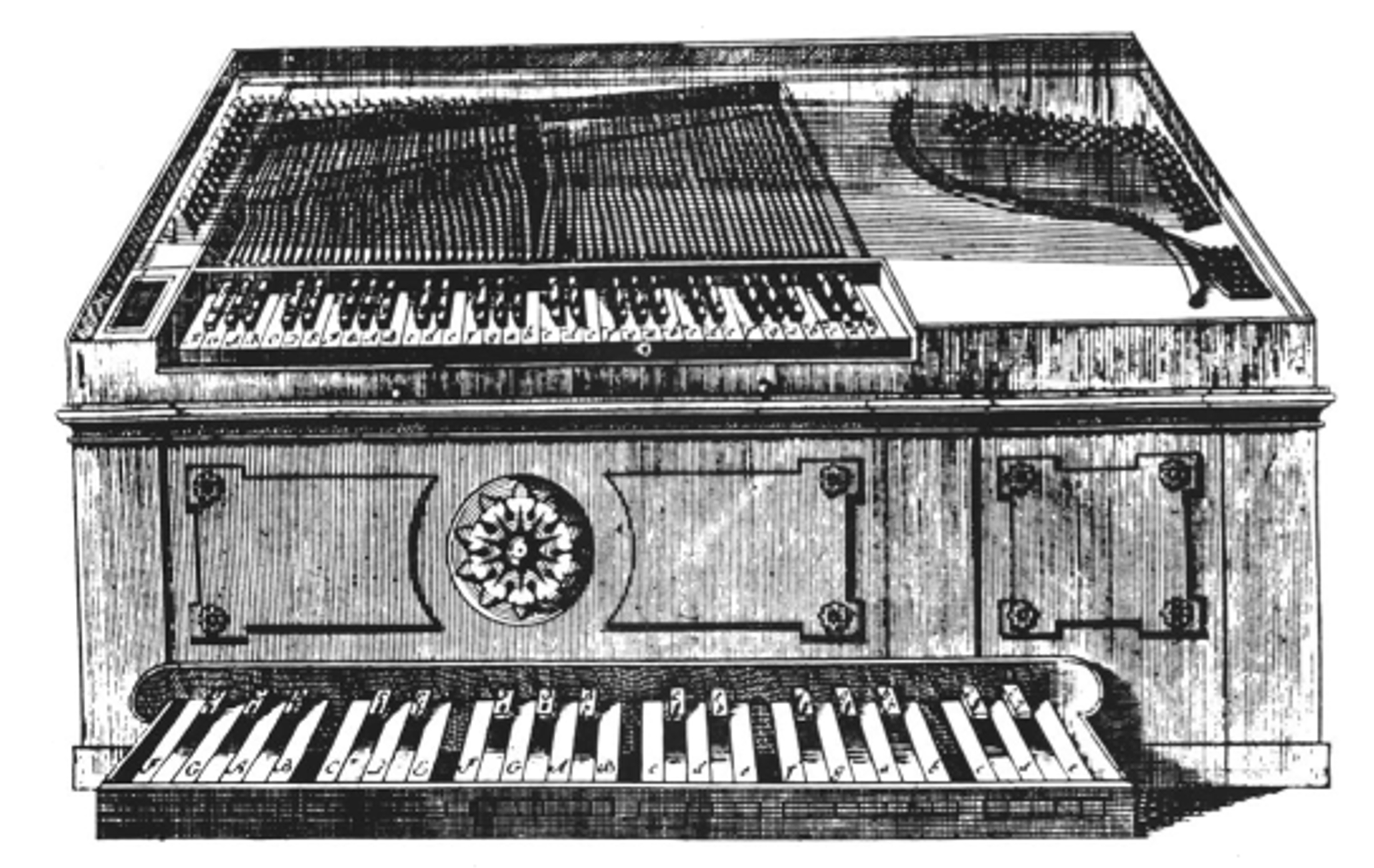
J. Verscheure Reynvaan: engraving of an eighteenth-century pedal clavichord

While clavichords were typically single manual instruments, they could be stacked, one clavichord on top of another, to provide multiple keyboards. With the addition of a pedal clavichord, which included a pedal keyboard for the lower notes, a clavichord could be used to practice organ repertoire. Most often, the addition of a pedal keyboard only involved connecting the keys of the pedalboard to the lower notes on the manual clavichord using string so the lower notes on the manual instrument could be operated by the feet. In the era of pipe organs, which used man-powered bellows that required several people to operate, and of churches only heated during church services if at all, organists used pedal harpsichords and pedal clavichords as practice instruments (see also: pedal piano). There is speculation that some works written for organ may have been intended for pedal clavichord. An interesting case is made by Speerstra (2004) that Bach's "Eight Little Preludes and Fugues", now thought spurious, may actually be authentic. The keyboard writing seems unsuited to organ, but Speerstra argues that they are idiomatic on the pedal clavichord. As Speerstra and Williams (2003) also note, the compass of the keyboard parts of Bach's six trio sonatas for organ (BWV 525–530) rarely go below the tenor C, so they could have been played on a single manual pedal clavichord, by moving the left hand down an octave, a customary practice in the 18th century.

== Repertoire ==
Much of the musical repertoire written for harpsichord and organ from the period circa 1400–1800 can be played on the clavichord; however, it does not have enough (unamplified) volume to participate in chamber music, with the possible exception of providing accompaniment to a soft baroque flute, recorder, or single singer. J. S. Bach's son Carl Philipp Emanuel Bach was a great proponent of the instrument, and most of his German contemporaries regarded it as a central keyboard instrument, for performing, teaching, composing and practicing. The fretting of a clavichord provides new problems for some repertoire, but scholarship suggests that these problems are not insurmountable in Bach's Well-Tempered Clavier.

C. P. E. Bach, one of the leading representatives of the 'Empfindsamer stil' or 'Sensitive Style,' emphasized emotional depth and expressiveness in his compositions. The clavichord was very successful in conveying these characteristics. With its unique sound, touch sensitivity, and ability to convey the most delicate nuances, the clavichord became C. P. E. Bach's most preferred instrument. C. P. E. Bach also used the fortepiano in his compositions, but he was much more interested in the technical features provided by the clavichord. He mentioned this in his book (Versuch über die wahre, Art das Clavier zu spielen, Carl Philipp Emanuel Bach, Berlin, 1759.): "Of the many keyboard instruments, many of which are little known because of defects, or because they have not yet been introduced everywhere, there are two which have been most widely acclaimed, the harpsichord and the clavichord. The former is used mainly in louder music, the latter alone. The more recent pianofortes, when they are durable and well built, have many advantages, although their touch must be carefully worked out, a task which is not without difficulties. They sound well by themselves and in small ensembles. Yet, I hold that a good clavichord, except for its weaker tone, shares equally in the attractiveness of the pianoforte and in addition features the vibrato (Bebung) and portato (Tragen der Töne) which I produce by means of added pressure after each stroke. It is at the clavichord that a keyboard player may be most exactly evaluated."

Among recent clavichord recordings, those by Christopher Hogwood (The Secret Bach, The Secret Handel, and The Secret Mozart), break new ground. In his liner notes, Hogwood pointed out that these composers would typically have played the clavichord in the privacy of their homes. In England, the composer Herbert Howells (1892–1983) wrote two significant collections of pieces for clavichord (Lambert's Clavichord and Howells' Clavichord), and Stephen Dodgson (1924–2013) wrote two clavichord suites. A comprehensive catalogue of modern clavichord works and discography was published in 2024.

In a note written by Wolfgang Amadeus Mozart's wife, Constanze Mozart (1761–1842), found inside Mozart's clavichord, it is mentioned that Mozart composed his works, including The Magic Flute, La Clemenza di Tito, The Requiem, and a Masonic Cantata, on this clavichord.

Haydn composed the greater part of "The Creation", one of his masterpieces, on the clavichord. He used the clavichord to accompany the voice.

== See also ==
- Harpsichord
