= Pedal clavichord =

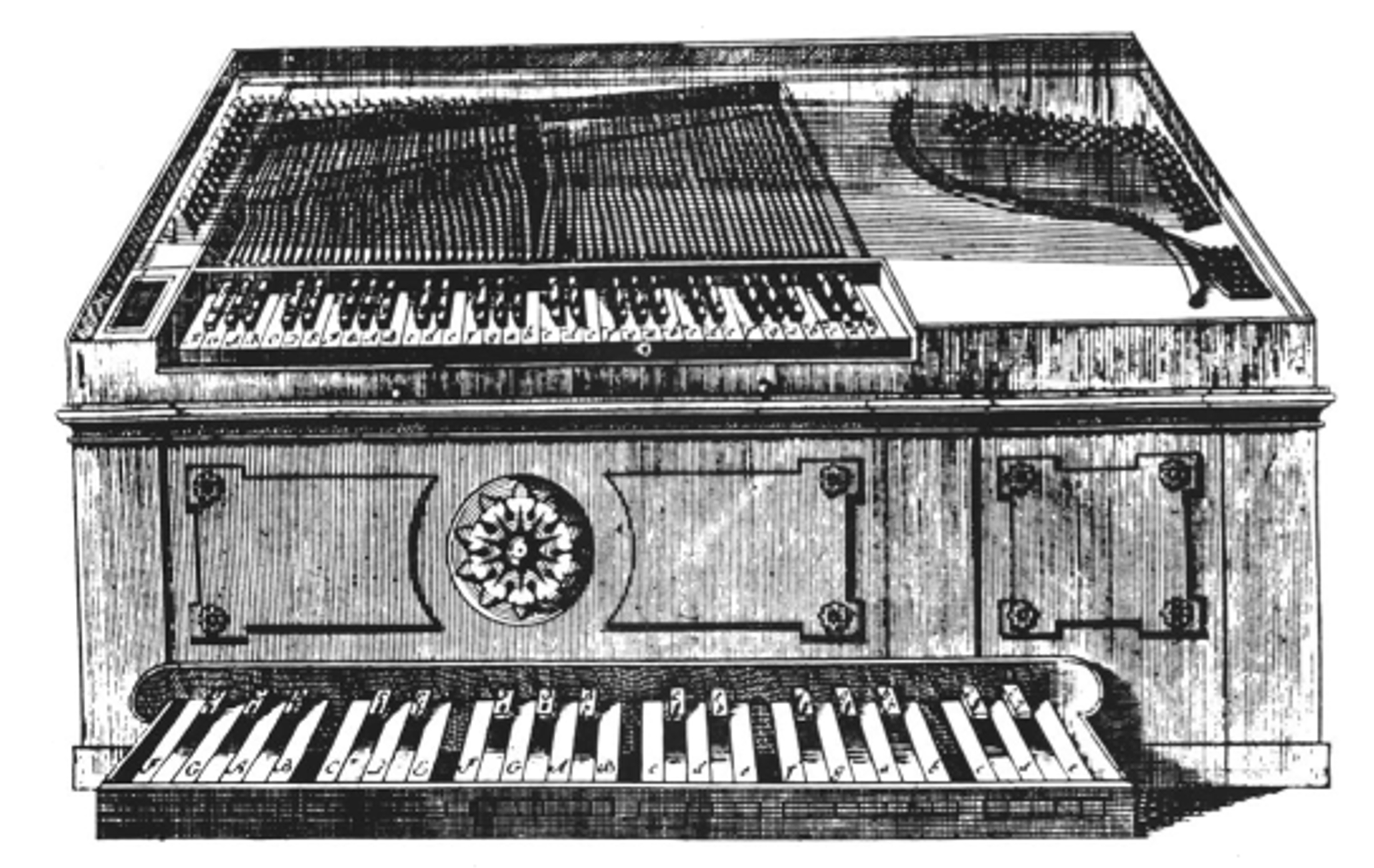
J. Verscheure Reynvaan: engraving of an eighteenth-century pedal clavichord

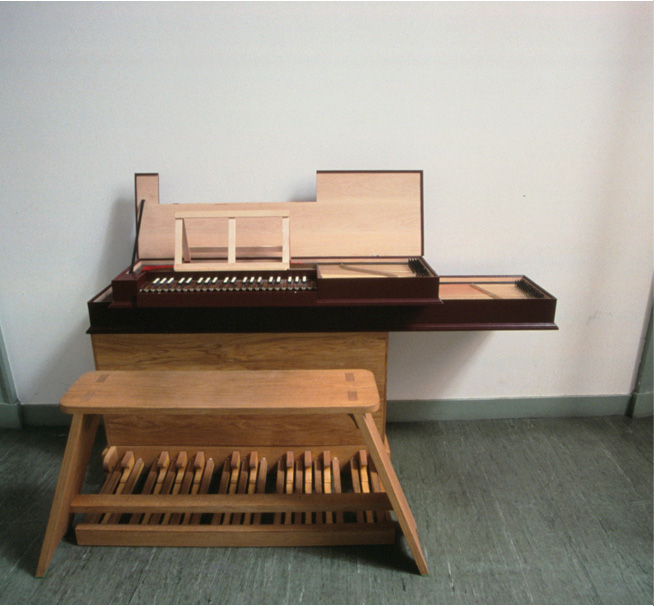
Pedal clavichord

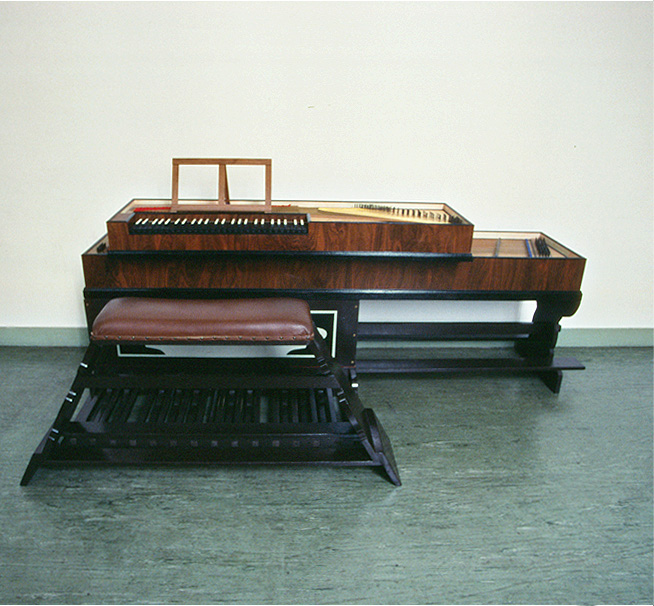
Pedal clavichord

The clavichord is a keyboard instrument. From the 16th century through the 18th century, this instrument was excellently suited to serve as a practice, training and living-room instrument. Some clavichords had a pedal keyboard allowing them to be played with the feet. It served to replace the church organ.

While clavichords were typically single manual instruments, they could be stacked to provide multiple keyboards. With the addition of a pedal clavichord, which included a pedal keyboard for the lower notes, a clavichord could be used to practice organist repertoire. In the era of pipe organs which used hand-pumped blowers, and of churches which were only heated during church services, organists used pedal harpsichords and pedal clavichords as practice instruments (see also: pedal piano).

== Repertoire ==
There is speculation that some works written for organ may have been intended for pedal clavichord. An interesting case is made by Harald Vogel that Bach's "Eight Little Preludes and Fugues", now thought to be spurious, may actually be authentic. The keyboard writing seems unsuited to organ, but Vogel argues that they are idiomatic on the pedal clavichord. As Williams (2003) also notes, the compass of the keyboard parts of Bach's six Organ Sonatas, BWV 525–530 rarely go below the tenor C, so could have been played on a single manual pedal clavichord, by moving the left hand down an octave, a customary practice in the 18th century.

== Modern history ==
Various modern copies have been made of surviving pedal clavichords, such as the one in the Instrumenten-Museum in the University of Leipzig built in the 1760s by the organ-builder Johann David Gerstenberg from Geringswalde in Saxony.

The Pedalclavichord Foundation contributed to the knowledge of the 17th century music practice. Clavichormaker Dick Verwolf made a replica of the pedalclavichord by Gerstenberg in 1991. This replica is now used at the Conservatorium van Amsterdam for study purposes. Dick Verwolf also made a reconstruction of a pedalclavichord from the 16th century.
