= Robert Köbler =

German organist

Robert Hans Friedrich Köbler (21 February 1912 – 7 September 1970) was a German organist, pianist, composer and professor at the University of Leipzig.

Köbler was born in Waldsassen. He studied church music in Leipzig from 1931 to 1934, organ with Karl Straube and piano with Carl Martienssen. Köbler was cantor and organist in Löbau from 1935 to 1945. From 1946 he had a teaching position for organ and harpsichord in Leipzig. In 1949 he became organist at the Paulinerkirche, Leipzig's university church. He was appointed professor of organ and harpsichord in 1956.

Köbler was primarily known as an organist, especially for his often humorous improvisations. Concert tours took him to Eastern and Western European countries.

Köbler died in Buch of cancer, at age 58.

== Compositions ==
Köbler wrote compositions for piano, organ and voice, including:

- Klavierstücke für Kinder (Edition Peters)
- Fünf Lieder nach Gedichten von Wilhelm Busch (Breitkopf & Härtel)
- Vier gemischte Chöre a cappella (Breitkopf & Härtel)
- Fünf Fugen (Edition Peters)

== Recordings ==
He recorded several LPs, principally of Johann Sebastian Bach works, for the DDR's Eterna label. He recorded mainly on organ, and occasionally on harpsichord.
