= Peter Williams (musicologist) =

English musicologist (1937–2016)

Peter Williams (14 May 1937 – 20 March 2016) was an English musicologist, author, harpsichordist, organist, and professor. Williams was considered one of the leading scholars on the organ and the life and works of Johann Sebastian Bach.

== Life and education ==
Peter Fredric Williams was born in Wolverhampton, England on 14 May 1937 to a Methodist family. He received a Bachelor of Arts (1958), Bachelor of Music (1959), Master of Arts (1962), and a PhD (1963) at St. John's College in Cambridge. Williams became a lecturer at the University of Edinburgh in 1962, eventually becoming a reader in 1972, then a professor ten years later, where he held the first chair in performance practice in the UK. He was made Distinguished Professor of Arts and Sciences at Duke University in Durham, North Carolina in 1985. Here, he was also chairman of the music department (1985–1988), university organist (1985–1990), and the director of the graduate center for performance practice studies (1990–1997). He was a professor at Cardiff University from 1996 to 2002, and served as chairman, subsequently President, of the British Institute of Organ Studies from 1996 to 2002. He was also a patron of the Cambridge Academy of Organ Studies, since its inception in 2004. Williams married in 1982, and had two sons, as well as a daughter and a son from a previous marriage.

== Research and publications ==
Williams was a prolific writer in the venues of organ and harpsichord building and performance. He published his first major writing, "The European Organ, 1450–1850" in 1966, and "Figured Bass Accompaniment" in 1970. He published his defining work, the three-volume "The Organ Music of J.S. Bach" through Cambridge University Press in the 1980s, then revised and combined these in a one-volume second edition in 2003. It was here where Williams suggested that the famous Toccata and Fugue in D minor, BWV 565 was probably not written for the organ, and possibly not by Bach. He further reiterated this statement in a 1981 article for the journal, Early Music. He served as a general editor of 80 volumes of the Biblioteca Organologica series since 1966, and was a founding editor of The Organ Yearbook since 1969.

== Bibliography ==
- The European Organ 1450–1850 (London, 1966; 2nd edition, 1978, ISBN 0713407530)
- Figured Bass Accompaniment (2 vols., Edinburgh, 1970, ISBN 0852240546; 2nd edition, 1972)
- Bach Organ Music (London, 1972 ISBN 0563103485; 2nd edition, 1974)
- A New History of the Organ: From the Greeks to the Present Day (London, 1980, ISBN 0571114598)
- The Organ Music of J.S. Bach:
  - 1st edition in 3 volumes (Cambridge, 1980s):
    1. BWV 525–598, 802–805, etc. (1980, ISBN 0521217237)
    2. BWV 599–771, etc. (1980, ISBN 0521317002)
    3. A Background (1984, ISBN 0521379784)
  - 2nd edition in one volume (2003, ISBN 0521891159)
- (As an editor): Bach, Handel, Scarlatti. Tercentenary Essays (Cambridge, 1985, ISBN 0521252172)
- Playing the Works of Bach: Some Case Studies (American Guild of Organists, New York, 1986)
- (With Barbara Owen): The Organ (New Grove Musical Instruments Series, London and New York, 1988, ISBN 0333444469)
- (With R. Larry Todd, editor): Perspectives on Mozart Performance (Cambridge, 1991, ISBN 0521400724); (Cambridge, 2006, ISBN 0521024064)
- The Organ in Western Culture 750–1250 (Cambridge, 1993, ISBN 0521418437)
- The King of Instruments or, How Do Churches Come to Have Organs? (London, 1993, ISBN 0281046646)
- Bach: The Goldberg Variations (Cambridge University Press, 2001, ISBN 0521807352)
- The Organ Music of J.S. Bach (Cambridge, 2003, ISBN 0521891159)
- The Life of Bach (Cambridge, 2004, ISBN 0521826365)
- J.S. Bach: A Life in Music (Cambridge, 2007, ISBN 9780521870740)
- Bach: A Musical Biography (Cambridge, 2016, ISBN 9781107139251)
