= Großhartmannsdorf =

- Municipality
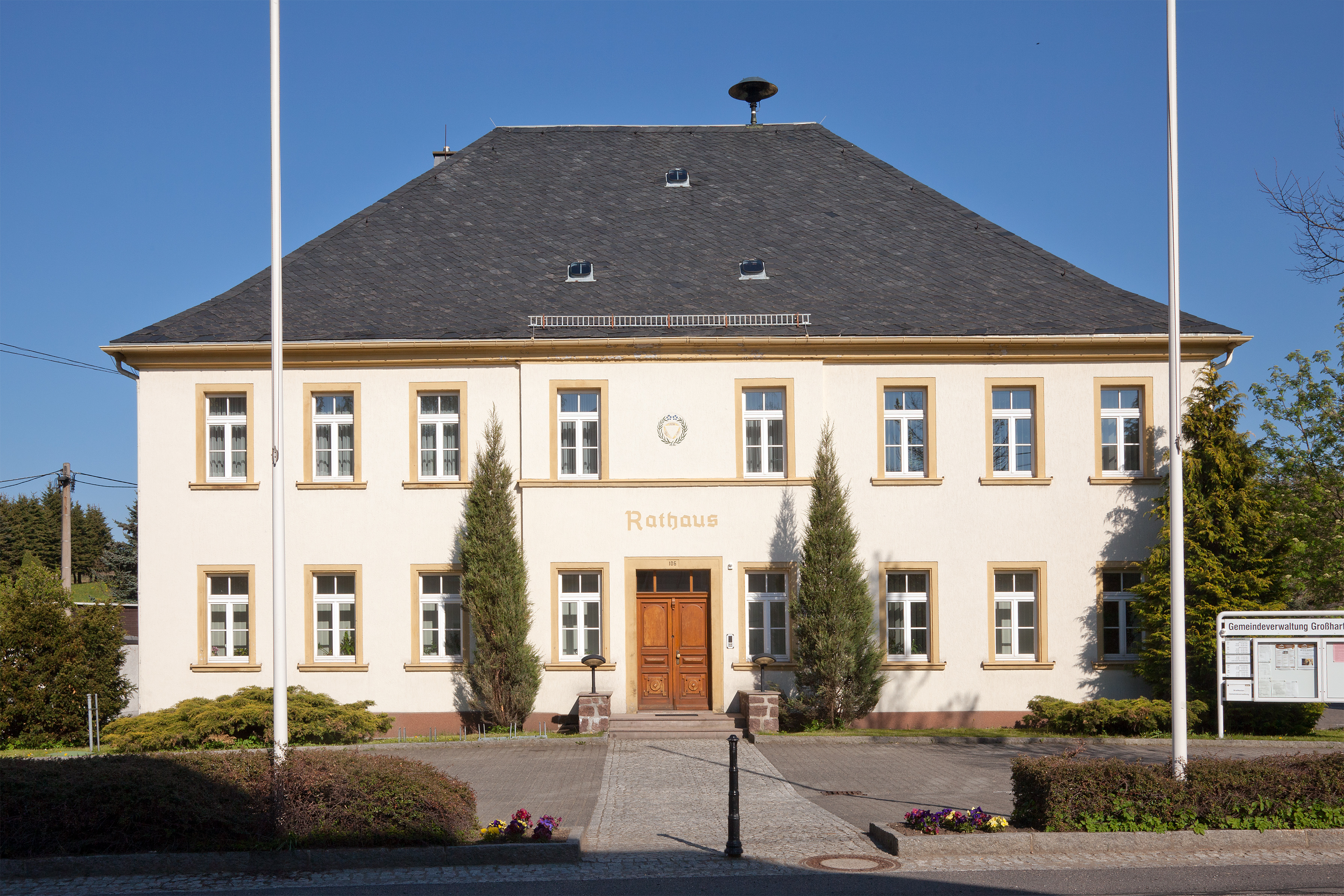
- Großhartmannsdorf town hall

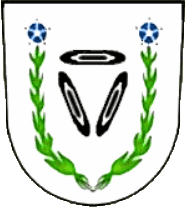
- Coat of arms

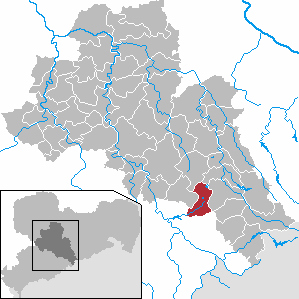
- Location of Großhartmannsdorf within Mittelsachsen district
- Interactive map of Großhartmannsdorf
- Location within Germany Location within Saxony
- Coordinates: 50°47′50″N 13°19′10″E
- Country: Germany
- State: Saxony
- District: Mittelsachsen

Government
  - Mayor (2020–27): Dirk Müller (CDU)

Area
  - Total: 32.23 km^{2} (12.44 sq mi)
- Elevation: 509 m (1,670 ft)

Population (2025-12-31)
  - Total: 2,347
  - Density: 72.82/km^{2} (188.6/sq mi)
- Time zone: UTC+01:00 (CET)
  - Summer (DST): UTC+02:00 (CEST)
- Postal codes: 09618
- Dialling codes: 037329
- Vehicle registration: FG
- Website: grosshartmannsdorf.de

Großhartmannsdorf is a municipality in the district of Mittelsachsen, in Saxony, Germany.
