= Meiningen =

- Town
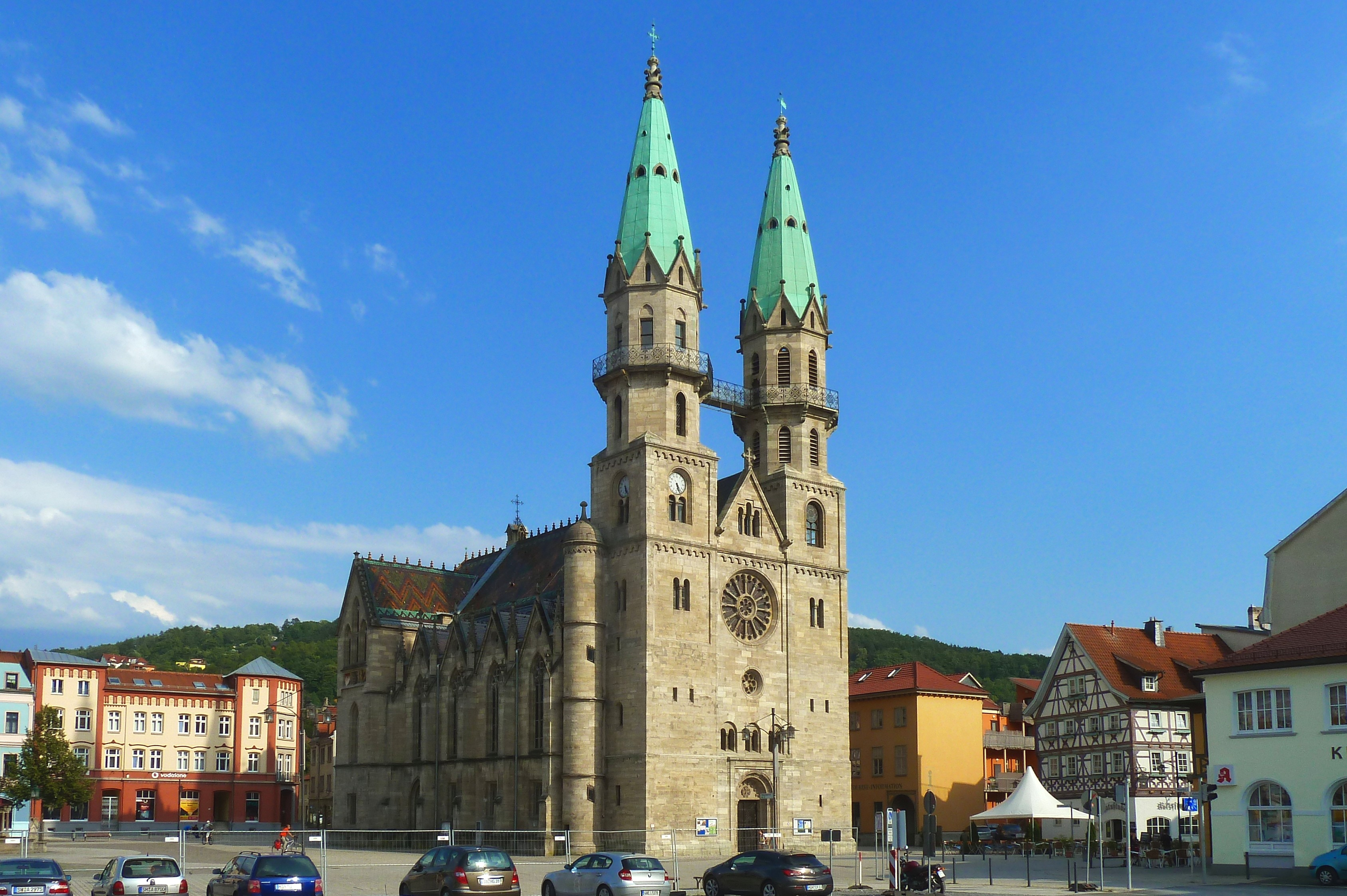
- Stadtkirche (town church)

- Coat of arms

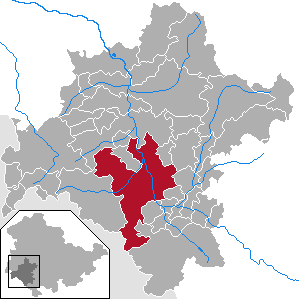
- Location of Meiningen within Schmalkalden-Meiningen district
- Interactive map of Meiningen
- Location within Germany Location within Thuringia
- Coordinates: 50°33′N 10°25′E
- Country: Germany
- State: Thuringia
- District: Schmalkalden-Meiningen

Government
  - Mayor (2024–30): Fabian Giesder (SPD)

Area
  - Total: 123.03 km^{2} (47.50 sq mi)
- Elevation: 287 m (942 ft)

Population (2025-12-31)
  - Total: 25,002
  - Density: 203.22/km^{2} (526.33/sq mi)
- Time zone: UTC+01:00 (CET)
  - Summer (DST): UTC+02:00 (CEST)
- Postal codes: 98617
- Dialling codes: 03693
- Vehicle registration: MGN, SM
- Website: www.meiningen.de

Meiningen (German: [ˈmaɪnɪŋən]) is a town in the southern part of the German state of Thuringia. It is located in the region of Franconia and has a population of around 26,000 (2024). Meiningen is the capital and the largest town of the Schmalkalden-Meiningen district. From 1680 to 1918, Meiningen was the capital of the Duchy of Saxe-Meiningen and from 1918 to 1920 of the Free State of Saxe-Meiningen.

Meiningen is considered the cultural, judicial and financial centre of southern Thuringia and thus hosts the state theatre, justice center, state archives, bank buildings and many museums. It is economically reliant on mechanical engineering, high-tech industry and tourism. The dialect and language of the inhabitants is East Franconian.

== History ==
=== Through the Middle Ages ===
Meiningen originated during the formation of the Frankish Empire in the 6th or 7th century, which established trade routes, river crossings and boundary markers. An intersection of two trade routes and a ford was located at the present-day southern end of the old town near the Werra river.

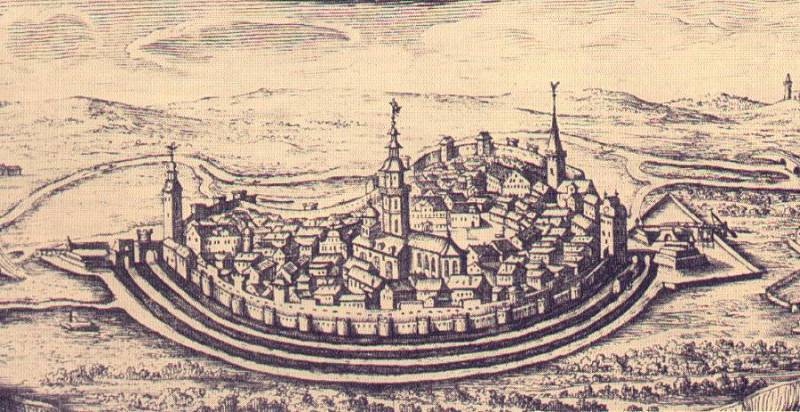
Meiningen in 1676

Meiningen was first mentioned in 982 (extract certificate: "…in villis Meininga in Meiningermarca…"). The village was first a crown land in the Duchy of Franconia and later a possession of the king. Around the year 1000, construction of the Stadtkirche (town church) began. It was several times expanded and rebuilt over the centuries. German Emperor Henry II donated Meiningen in 1008 to the Roman Catholic Diocese of Würzburg, and for 534 years it remained part of Würzburg. To protect their property, the Bishops of Würzburg built a moated castle (today Schloss Elisabethenburg palace) in the 11th century. In 1153, the plague raged in Meiningen, which was also granted judicial rights (the first town-charter type of rights) that year by the rulers. In 1222, Würzburg and the House of Henneberg fought for possession of Meiningen, while the town suffered extensive damage. Meiningen was first mentioned in 1230 as a Stadt (town) and was granted wide-ranging autonomy in 1344. During this time the citizens built a powerful fortification with a double wall and three moats. From 1239 to 1242 the Friars Minor of the Franciscan Order built a monastery between the castle and the Lower Gate. In 1380, a fire destroyed around a quarter of the town, including the archives of the town council. The town joined with ten other towns of the Bishopric of Würzburg and participated in 1396–1399 in the "Franconian town war" against the diocese. Würzburg troops besieged Meiningen, until it capitulated in 1399. In an uprising on 10 August 1432, the citizens destroyed the castle (Würzburger Burg or Burg Meiningen). In the years 1443–1455, the town church was enlarged in the Gothic style.

=== Early modern period ===
Meiningen had about 2,000 inhabitants in 1450. At the end of the 15th century two devastating fires destroyed almost the whole town. 26 people were killed. The town church was spared from the fire. Bishop Lorenz von Bibra built a new castle from 1509 to 1511. In the town textiles, metal working and trade became more important. In 1542, Meiningen came to the Henneberg family in exchange for the administrative district (Amt) of Mainberg from the Prince-Bishop of Würzburg, Conrad von Bibra. In 1583, with the extinction of the Henneberg family, the town went to the Wettin family. The Wettin family established its seat of transitional government for the County of Henneberg in Meiningen until 1660. The town experienced a great economic boom driven by the fustian- and linen weaving, dyeing and fabric trades, which lasted until the beginning of the 17th century, resulting in faster population increase to about 5,000. For example, in 1614 234 master craftsmen produced 37,312 pieces of cloth that were traded throughout Europe. This period was ended abruptly by the Thirty Years' War in 1634, when Croatian troops plundered the town. In 1641, Swedish troops besieged the town. Meiningen lost thousands of inhabitants to death or expulsion.

=== Residence of the Duchy of Saxe-Meiningen ===
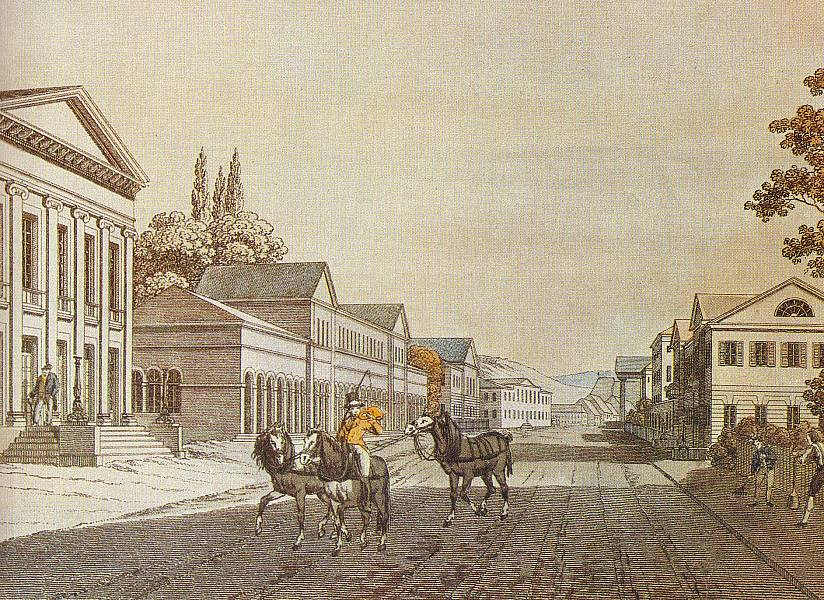
Meiningen Bernhardstreet in 1835

Between 1680 and 1918, Meiningen was the capital of the Duchy of Saxe-Meiningen. In 1682–92, the ducal palace Schloss Elisabethenburg was built and by 1690 the Court Orchestra had been created. From 1782, the Englischer Garten, an English landscape garden was created in the town center.

In 1813, a Russian army of 70,000 soldiers and 2,300 officers under Grand Duke Alexander in his campaign against Napoleon camped in and around Meiningen. The Tsar had his quarters in the inn Zum Braune Hirsch, which also served for the entrained Prussian Army as headquarters. In 1782, Friedrich Schiller had been a guest at the inn.

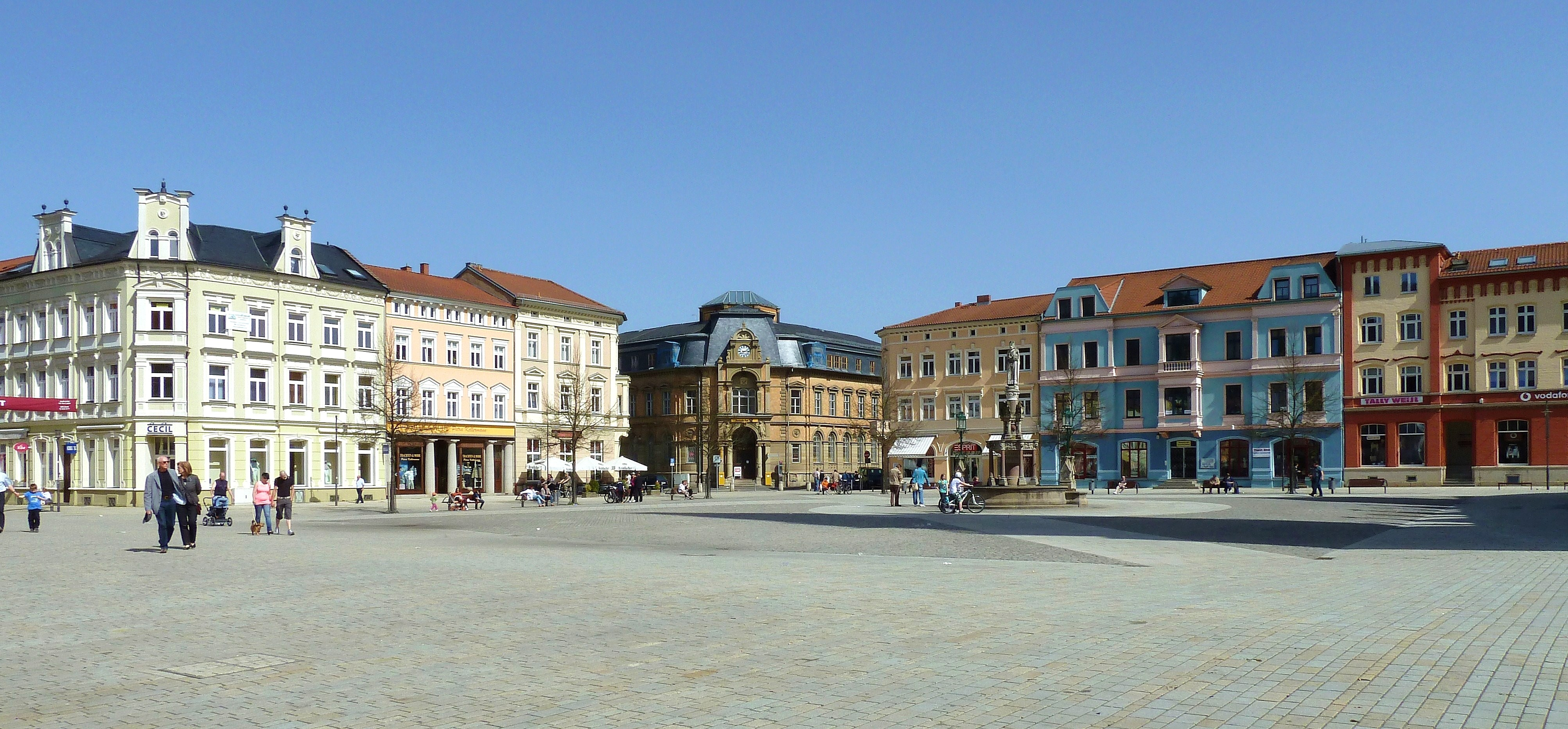
Market square

One of the princesses of Saxe-Meiningen, Adelheid Louise Theresa Caroline Amelia von Sachsen-Meiningen, became the wife of the future King William IV of Great Britain in 1818. The Australian city of Adelaide is named for her.

Georg II, Duke of Saxe-Meiningen, who became a great patron of the theatrical art, was born in 1826. The first Meiningen Court Theatre opened in 1831. The fairy tale collector and writer Ludwig Bechstein was an archivist in Meiningen. In 1858, the town was connected by the Werra Railway to the German railway network. In September 1874, a major fire destroyed a third of the town. The reconstruction took place in Neoclassical style with the financial help of many German and Austrian cities. In the same year, the Schweinfurt–Meiningen railway opened. A new town hall was built in 1878.

By end of the 19th century and by the beginning of the 20th century, the existence of several large banks made Meiningen an important financial centre in Germany. During these decades, the town stretched out far beyond its ancient limits. New residential areas were built, and the population grew rapidly. Many lavish buildings were built at that time. 1889, the town church was enlarged in the Gothic Revival style. A large fire destroyed the Hoftheater (court theatre) in 1908, it was rebuilt in Neoclassical style and reopened in December 1909. In 1914, the Meiningen Steam Locomotive Works was built.

=== After 1918 ===
The Duchy was abolished at the end of World War I in 1918. Meiningen then became the capital of the Free State of Saxe-Meiningen. From 1920, it was a district town in the newly created state of Thuringia. Thüringisches Staatsarchiv Meiningen was founded in 1923. In 1927, Flugplatz Meiningen, an airfield, was opened. In October 1931, airship LZ 127 Graf Zeppelin landed there before 100,000 spectators, followed by the airship LZ 130 Graf Zeppelin II on 9 July 1939. During World War II, Meiningen was the location of a prisoner of war hospital, and several German military hospitals. The Deutsche Dienststelle was based in the Drachenbergkaserne barracks from 1943 to 1945. A heavy air raid on Meiningen on 23 February 1945, by the USAAF caused 208 deaths, destroyed 251 houses and two bridges in total, and damaged 440 buildings. Meiningen was occupied by American armed forces on 5 April 1945.

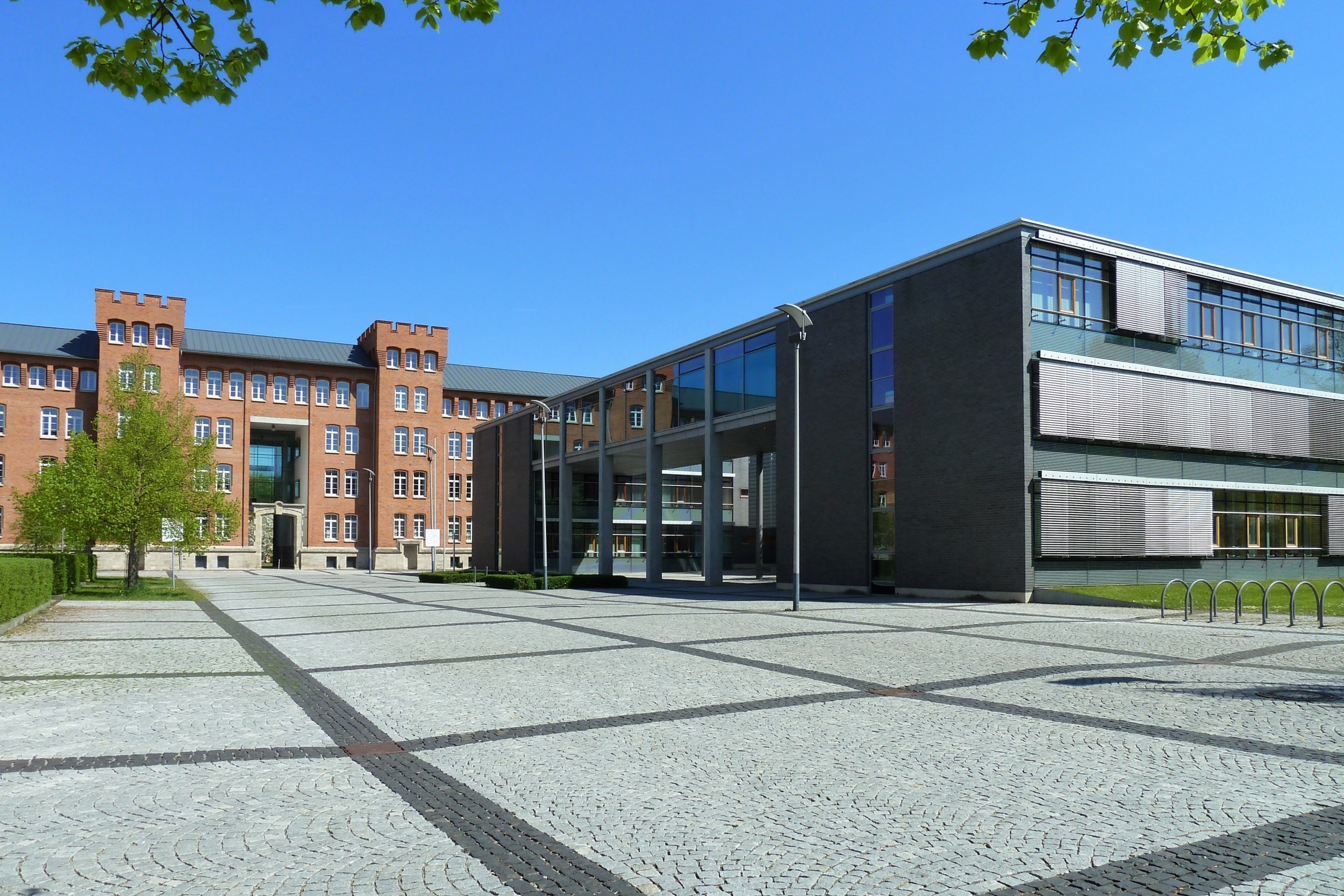
A part of the Justizzentrum (court house)

In July 1945, the town was included in the Soviet occupation zone along with the rest of Thuringia, and thus later became part of the German Democratic Republic (DDR). To accommodate workers for a microelectronics plant, the Robotron Meiningen, the new district of Jerusalem (Meiningen) was created from 1967 to 1983 in the north between Helba and Welkershausen, eventually housing around 6,000 inhabitants. Meiningen was an important center of Die Wende in southern Thuringia in 1989. Among the many events were a total of 25 demonstrations with 1,000-25,000 participants.

After German reunification in 1990, Meiningen became the district town of Schmalkalden-Meiningen. In the Dreißigacker district, new businesses and the new Meiningen Hospital were constructed. In the 1990s, there was a new construction boom in the town, with many houses being renovated and embellished. In July 1994, Chancellor of Germany Helmut Kohl visited the town, Angela Merkel did so in April 2012. The new Justizzentrum (court house) was built in 2000. In 2003, the town was connected to the Bundesautobahn 71. With the opening of the new Kammerspiele in June 2008, the town created another theater venue, underlining its national significance as a cultural town. In 2013, the new industrial area Rohrer Berg near the motorway junction Meiningen-North was created.

== Geography and climate ==
The town is situated in the valley of the Werra river between the Thuringian Forest and the Rhön Mountains. Meiningen lies 60 kilometres (37 miles) east of Fulda, 80 km (50 mi) south of Erfurt and 104 km (65 mi) north of Würzburg, across the former frontier between West and East Germany.

=== Subdivisions ===
Meiningen has several subdivisions. The urban districts are town center, North, East, South, Jerusalem (Meiningen), the rural communities are Helba (amalgamated in 1923) and Welkershausen (1936), as Dreißigacker (1990) and Herpf (2010). The former municipalities Henneberg, Wallbach and Walldorf were merged into Meiningen in January 2019, Stepfershausen in December 2019, and Sülzfeld in January 2024.

Meiningen abuts the following municipalities: Wasungen, Utendorf, Kühndorf, Rohr, Thuringia, Ellingshausen, Obermaßfeld-Grimmenthal, Untermaßfeld, Grabfeld, Mellrichstadt (Bavaria), Rhönblick, Rippershausen and Mehmels.

=== Climate ===
The relation to the surrounding mountain ranges of the Rhön mountains and the Thuringian Highland deep and sheltered Werra valley and the dense town buildings provide a regional level, for a mild climate in Meiningen. The following values are averages from 1990 until 2012. The average annual temperature is 9.1 °C (48.4 °F). Temperature extremes since 1960 at Meiningen have ranged from 36.1 °C (97.0 °F) on 7 August 2015, down to −18.5 °C (−1.3 °F) on 12 February 2012. The rainfall is 656 millimeters and the sun shines 1,559 hours per year.

Climate data for Meiningen (1991–2020 normals)
Month	Jan	Feb	Mar	Apr	May	Jun	Jul	Aug	Sep	Oct	Nov	Dec	Year
Record high °C (°F)	13.7 (56.7)	14.6 (58.3)	21.1 (70.0)	28.7 (83.7)	30.4 (86.7)	33.1 (91.6)	35.7 (96.3)	36.1 (97.0)	30.4 (86.7)	25.0 (77.0)	16.5 (61.7)	13.9 (57.0)	36.1 (97.0)
Mean daily maximum °C (°F)	1.8 (35.2)	3.2 (37.8)	7.8 (46.0)	13.2 (55.8)	17.3 (63.1)	20.5 (68.9)	22.7 (72.9)	22.5 (72.5)	17.7 (63.9)	11.9 (53.4)	5.9 (42.6)	2.4 (36.3)	12.2 (54.0)
Daily mean °C (°F)	−0.5 (31.1)	0.2 (32.4)	3.8 (38.8)	8.4 (47.1)	12.5 (54.5)	15.7 (60.3)	17.7 (63.9)	17.3 (63.1)	13.0 (55.4)	8.2 (46.8)	3.5 (38.3)	0.3 (32.5)	8.3 (46.9)
Mean daily minimum °C (°F)	−2.9 (26.8)	−2.8 (27.0)	0.0 (32.0)	3.5 (38.3)	7.4 (45.3)	10.6 (51.1)	12.6 (54.7)	12.3 (54.1)	8.6 (47.5)	4.9 (40.8)	1.2 (34.2)	−1.8 (28.8)	4.5 (40.1)
Record low °C (°F)	−20.4 (−4.7)	−19.2 (−2.6)	−19.1 (−2.4)	−10.7 (12.7)	−3.0 (26.6)	1.1 (34.0)	4.2 (39.6)	2.4 (36.3)	−1.2 (29.8)	−6.8 (19.8)	−13.3 (8.1)	−18.9 (−2.0)	−20.4 (−4.7)
Average precipitation mm (inches)	53.5 (2.11)	39.5 (1.56)	44.0 (1.73)	36.8 (1.45)	59.0 (2.32)	62.0 (2.44)	73.8 (2.91)	62.6 (2.46)	52.8 (2.08)	51.3 (2.02)	52.4 (2.06)	60.6 (2.39)	648.3 (25.52)
Average precipitation days (≥ 1.0 mm)	17.2	15.1	15.1	12.3	13.8	13.3	15.3	13.5	12.5	15.5	17.0	18.6	179.2
Average snowy days (≥ 1.0 cm)	15.5	14.9	7.2	0.4	0	0	0	0	0	0.2	3.7	10.8	52.7
Average relative humidity (%)	87.8	83.5	77.1	69.2	70.7	71.0	70.6	71.4	78.5	86.0	90.4	90.5	78.9
Mean monthly sunshine hours	44.8	73.8	122.5	173.8	200.9	206.5	216.7	202.9	151.9	99.0	40.8	33.0	1,571
Source 1: World Meteorological Organization
Source 2: Weather and climate in Meiningen

== Demographics ==
The town has about 25,000 (2021) inhabitants. Together with neighbouring Untermaßfeld, Obermaßfeld-Grimmenthal, Einhausen, Sülzfeld, Rippershausen, Ritschenhausen, Mellrichstadt, Wasungen and Utendorf, Meiningen forms a small conurbation with a population of about 70,000.

== Economy ==
=== Agriculture, industry and services ===
Meiningen offers over 16,400 jobs in around 3,600 small and medium-sized companies, medical facilities, cultural institutions and administrations. The largest employer is the hospital Klinikum Meiningen with nearly 1,000 employees.

Meiningen is a center of electrical engineering and high-tech manufacturing. Numerous companies in that industry (founded here or that have settled here) form a business cluster. This includes the global high-tech enterprise ADVA Optical Networking (ADVA AG).

Meiningen Steam Locomotive Works is the only plant in Western and Central Europe where steam locomotives can be completely repaired and maintained. it also builds new locomotives and repairs historic passenger coaches, diesel locomotives and other railway vehicles. Other companies provide hardware for doors and windows, tools, ovens, electric goods and radiators. In the food industry, there are a wholesale bakery and a meat plant.

Outside of manufacturing, the local savings bank (Sparkasse), municipal services, the theater and museums, the railway company Südthüringenbahn and health facilities are important in the local economy.

Agriculture plays a minor role in Meiningen as the soil is not very fertile. However, the rural districts Herpf and Dreißigacker account for most of the agricultural area (17.6% of the total municipal territory).

== Arts and culture ==
=== Theatre ===
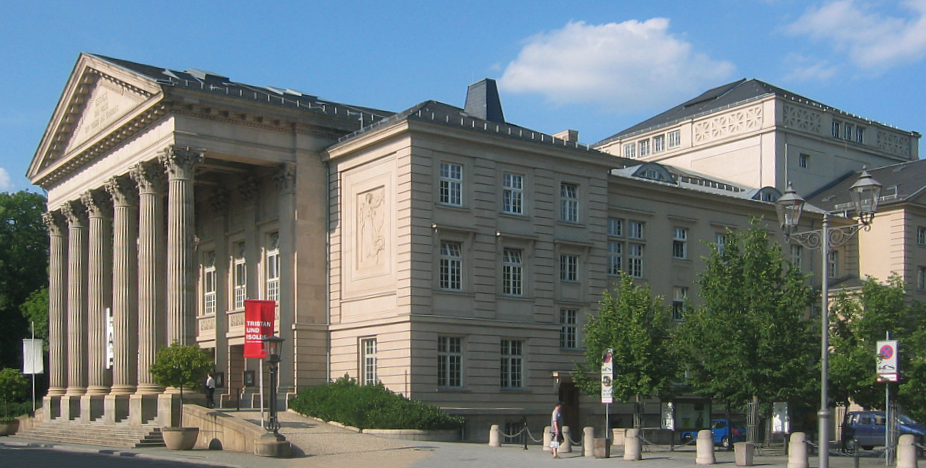
State Theatre Meiningen

The Staatstheater Meiningen offers musical theatre (opera, operetta, musicals), plays, symphony concerts, puppet shows, ballet and youth theatre. The Meiningen Hoftheater opened on 17 December 1831. It was destroyed in a fire in 1908 and was replaced in 1909 by the current building. The company was called the Meininger. It featured plays and gave concerts, and travelled throughout Germany and Europe. Active support by the Theaterherzog Georg II, Duke of Saxe-Meiningen (1866–1914) helped it to attain international celebrity. Today the theatre is known as "Staatstheater Meiningen" (State Theatre Meiningen). It employs more than 320 people. The Director is Jens Neundorff von Enzberg.

=== Meininger Hofkapelle ===
The Meiningen Court Orchestra is one of the oldest orchestras in Europe. The now 68-member orchestra is part of the Meininger Theatre and performs, in addition to opera accompaniment, regular symphony concerts and youth concerts. Philippe Bach was the music director from 2010 to 2022. His successor will be Killian Farrell (Ireland) from 2023.

The court orchestra was founded in 1690 by Duke Bernhard I. In October 1880 the most successful period of the orchestra began and it developed into an elite European orchestra under the direction of Hans von Bülow. During the von Bülow period, Johannes Brahms came to Meiningen to collaborate with the court orchestra and to conduct occasionally. Other notable conductors included Richard Strauss from 1885 to 1886, Max Reger from 1911 to 1914, and Kirill Petrenko from 1999 to 2002.

=== Kunsthaus ===
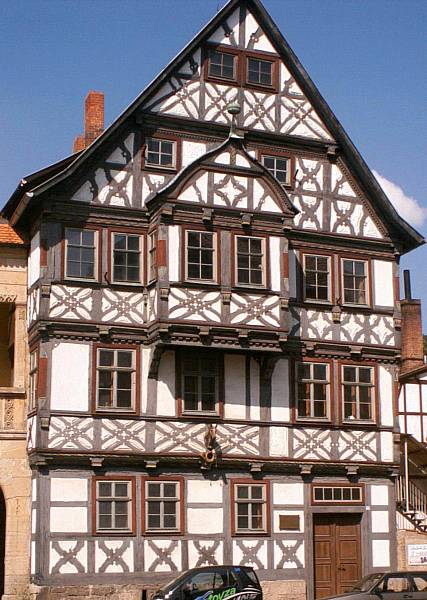
Art house Kunsthaus

The Kunsthaus Meiningen (art house) is a cultural institution in the historic half-timbered house Alte Posthalterei ("Old Post Office"). It presents exhibitions of contemporary art and offers workshops and job opportunities for local and foreign artists.

=== Museums ===
- Meininger Museen ("Meiningen Museums") comprise six cultural and historical museums which house the largest art collection in Thuringia. The main museum is in Schloss Elisabethenburg (Elisabethenburg Palace), the former residence of the Dukes of Saxe-Meiningen.
- Museum of Literature "Baumbachhaus" is mainly an exhibition on the life and work of local poet Rudolf Baumbach. Furthermore, there are exhibits on the interaction of Friedrich Schiller, Jean Paul and Ludwig Bechstein during their time in Meiningen. There is also a department of urban and local history.
- The newest art museum, opened in 1999, is the Theater Museum "Magic World of Scenery" in the former riding school near the palace. It offers an annually changing exhibit of historically important theatre stage backdrops and historical information on the European tours of the Meiningen Court Theatre.
- The Meininger Zweiradmuseum (MZM) shows all types of two-wheel vehicles produced in the GDR and a variety of police vehicles. This is run by a private club whose members acquire the models and restore them to their original condition.
- Meiningen Steam Locomotive Works from 2023 hosts an interactive museum. Here, visitors can learn all about steam locomotives. The focus of the exhibit is a locomotive that can be accessed on multiple levels.
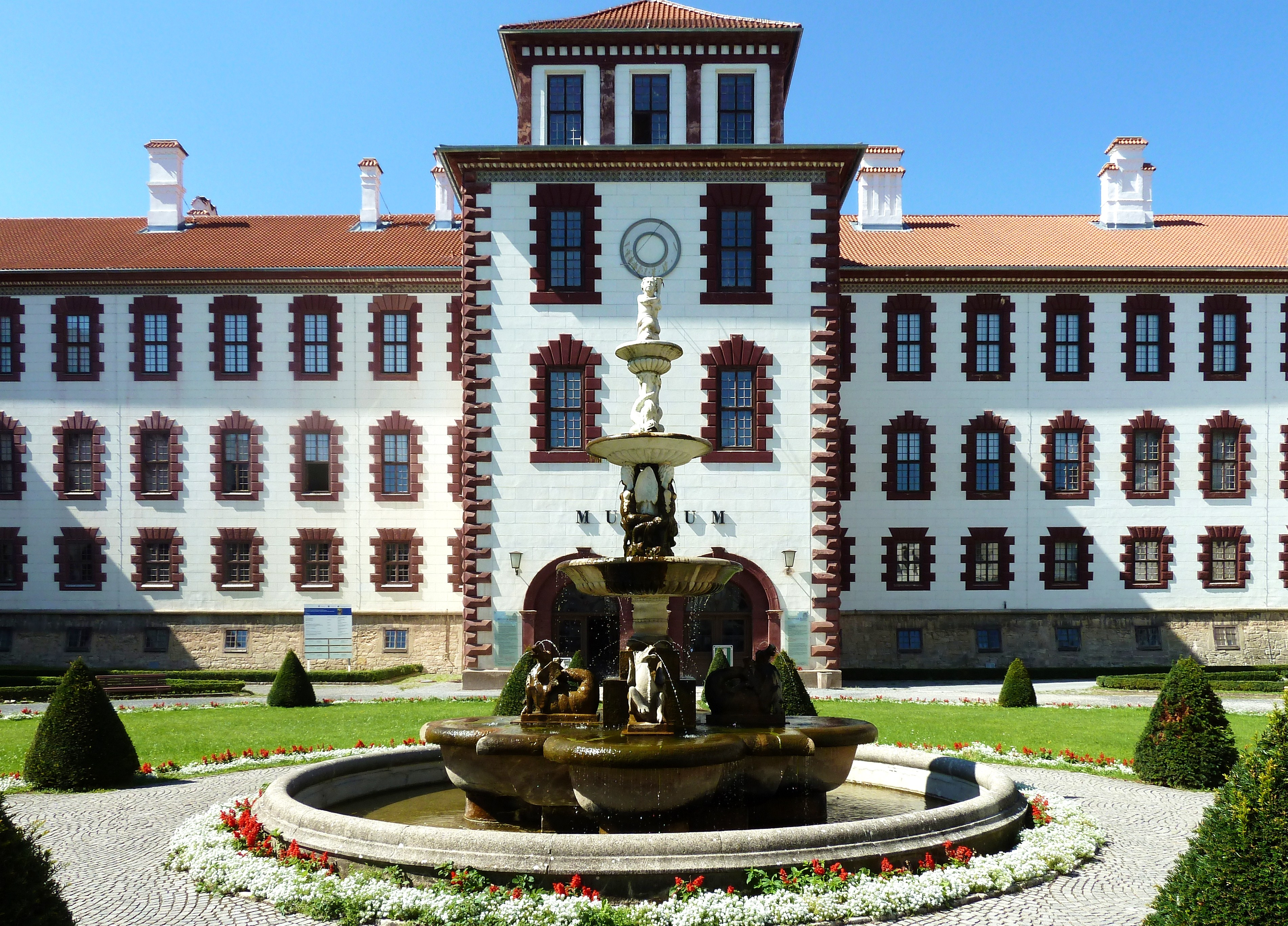
Meiningen Museums, main museum

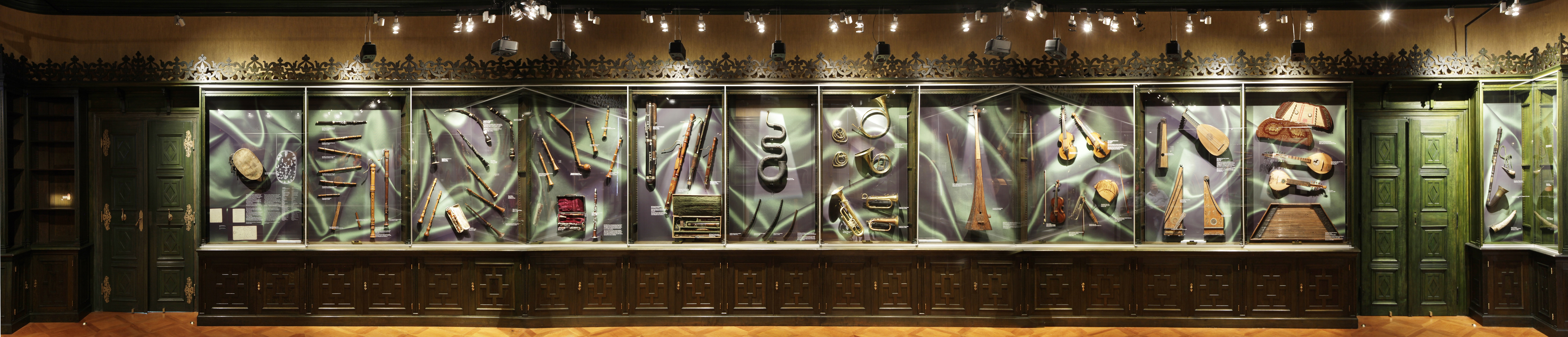
Meiningen Museums, Green library

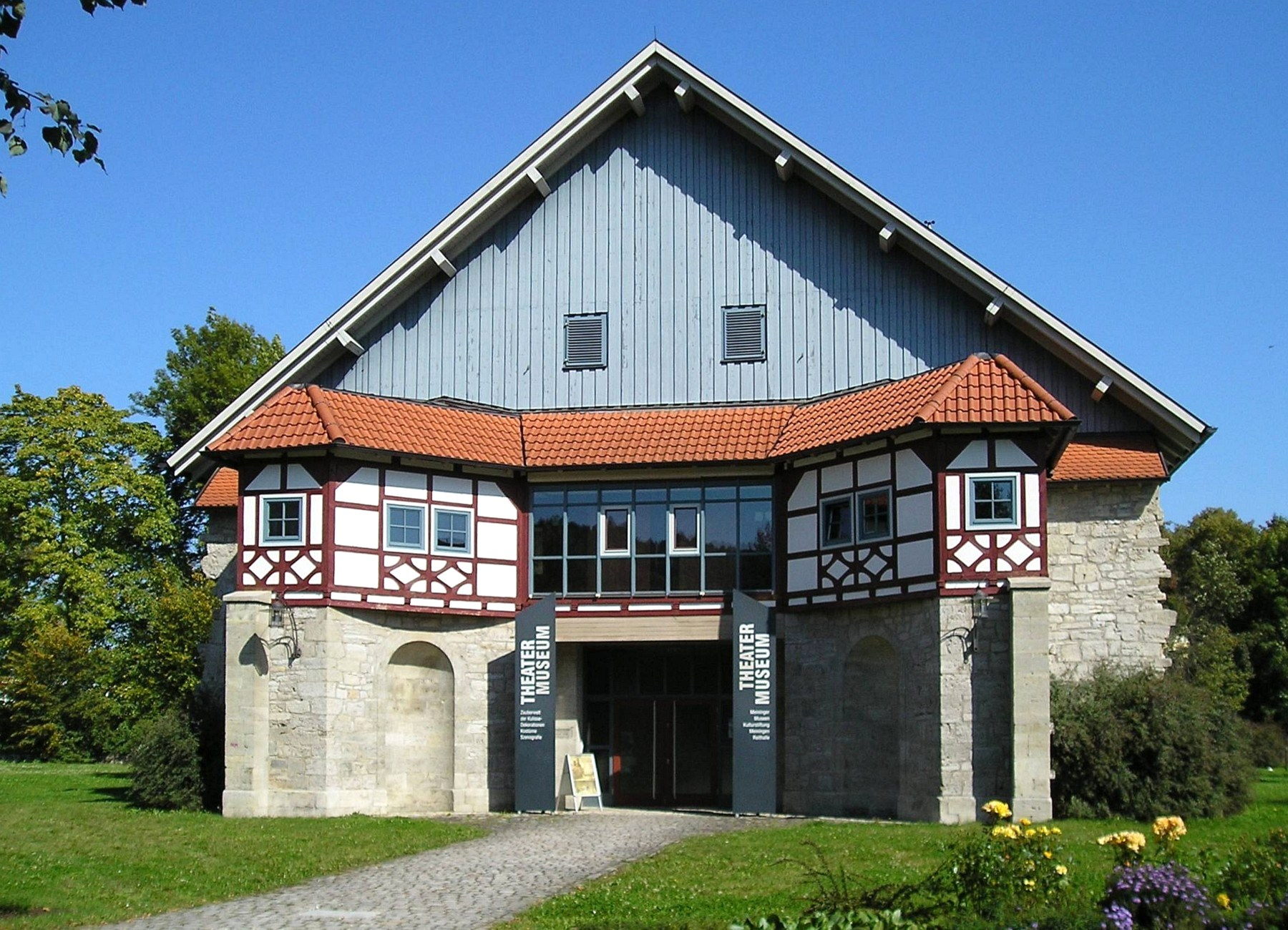
Theatre Museum

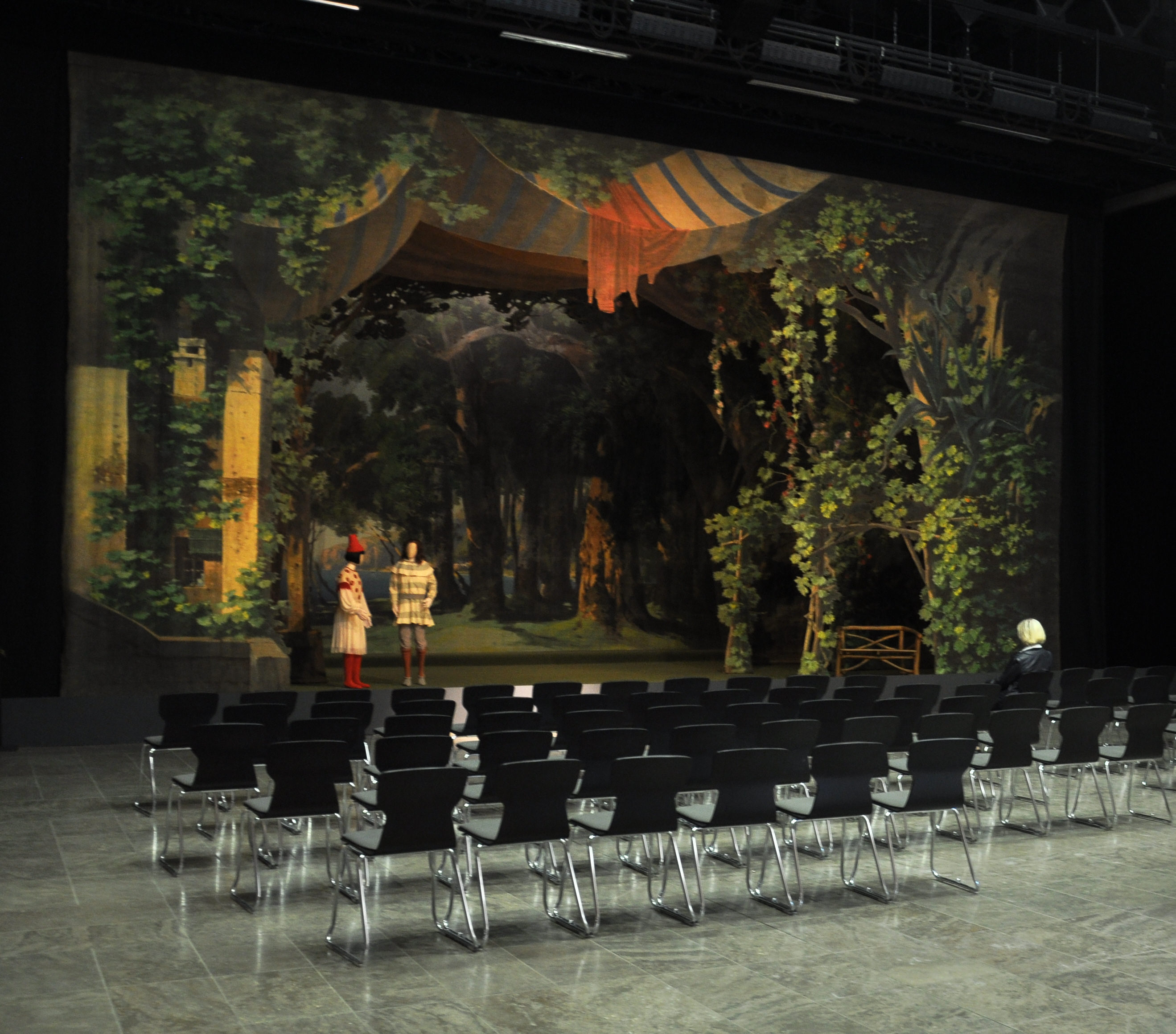
Exposition A Winter's Tale by William Shakespeare

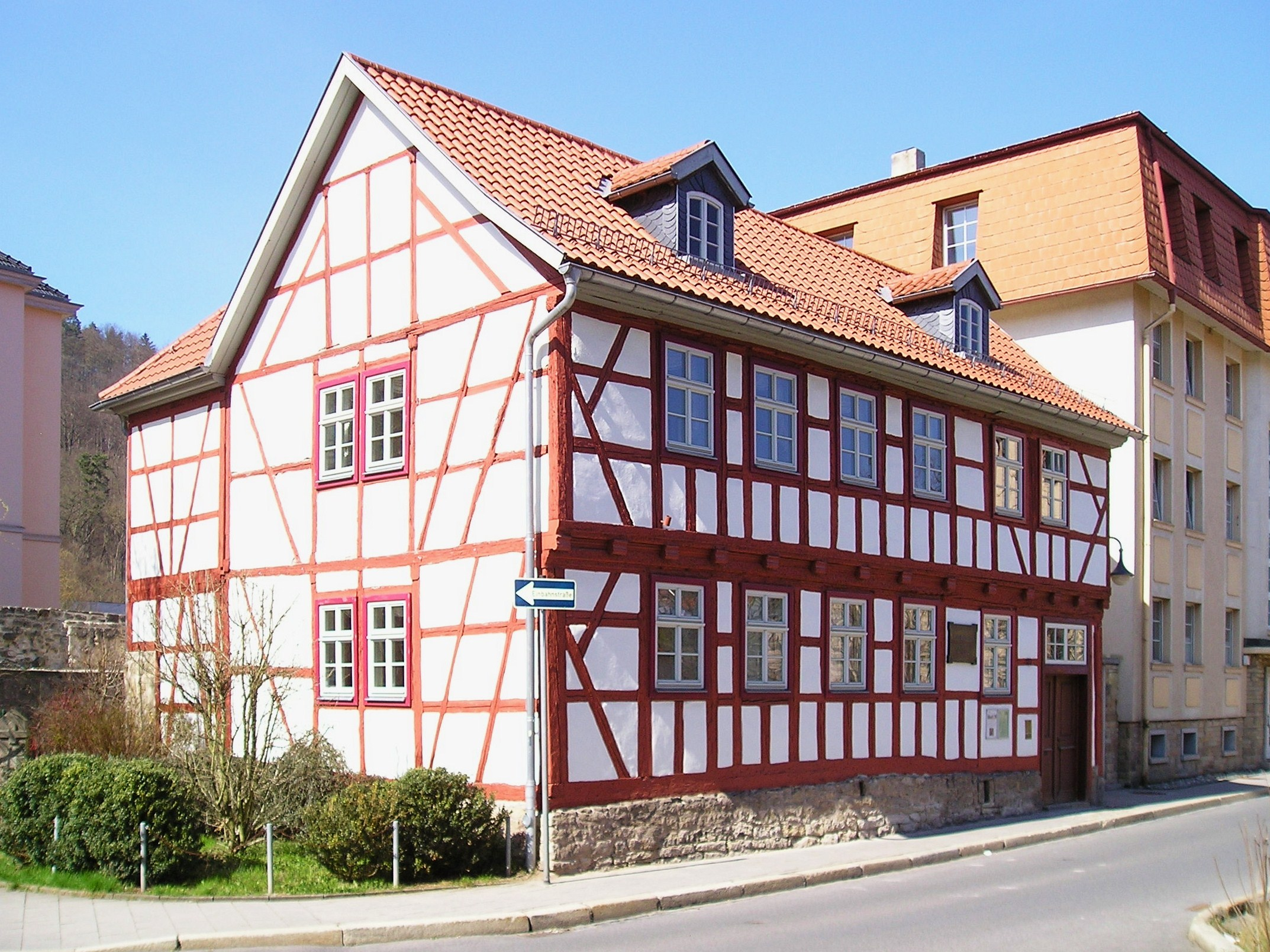
Literary museum Baumbachhaus

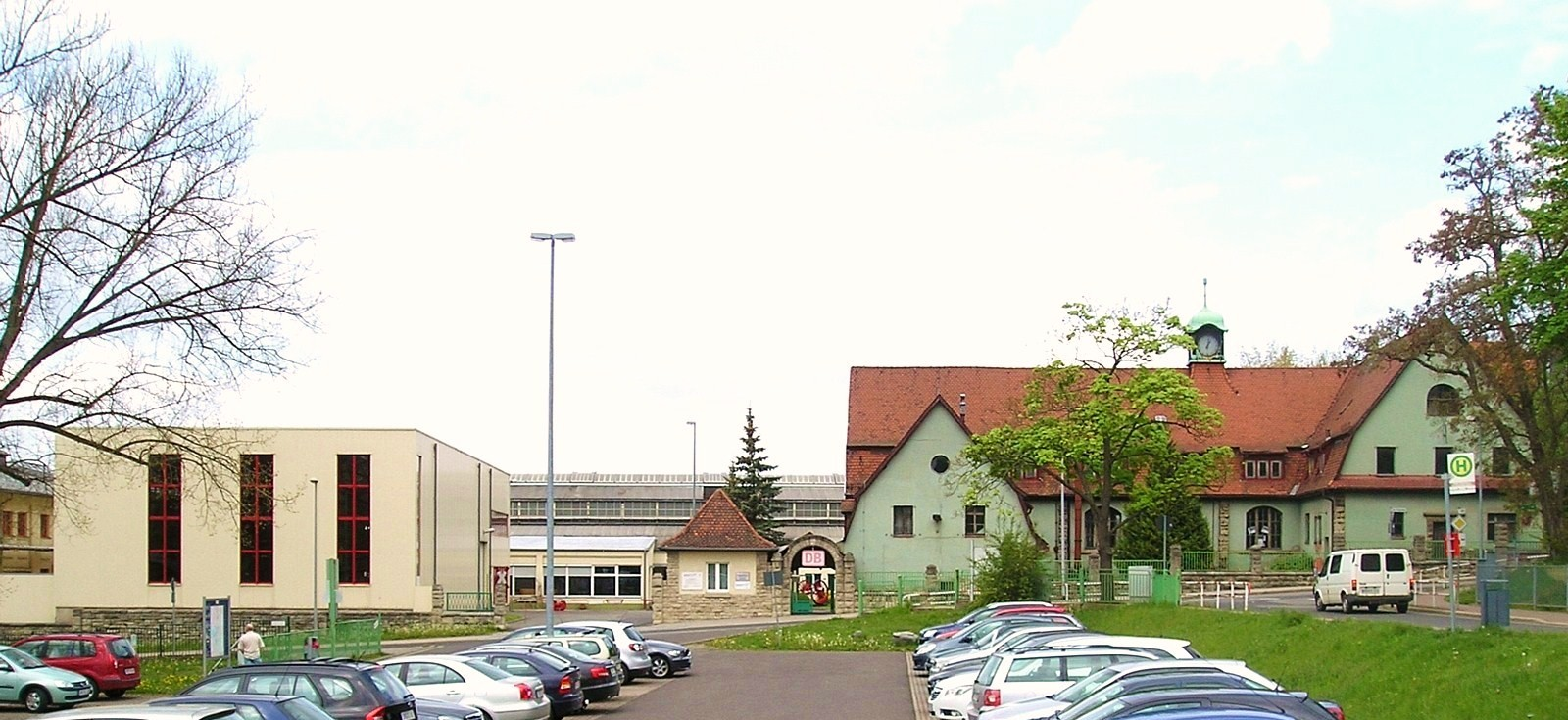
Steam Locomotive Works, museum in the green house

== Landmarks ==
=== Townscape ===
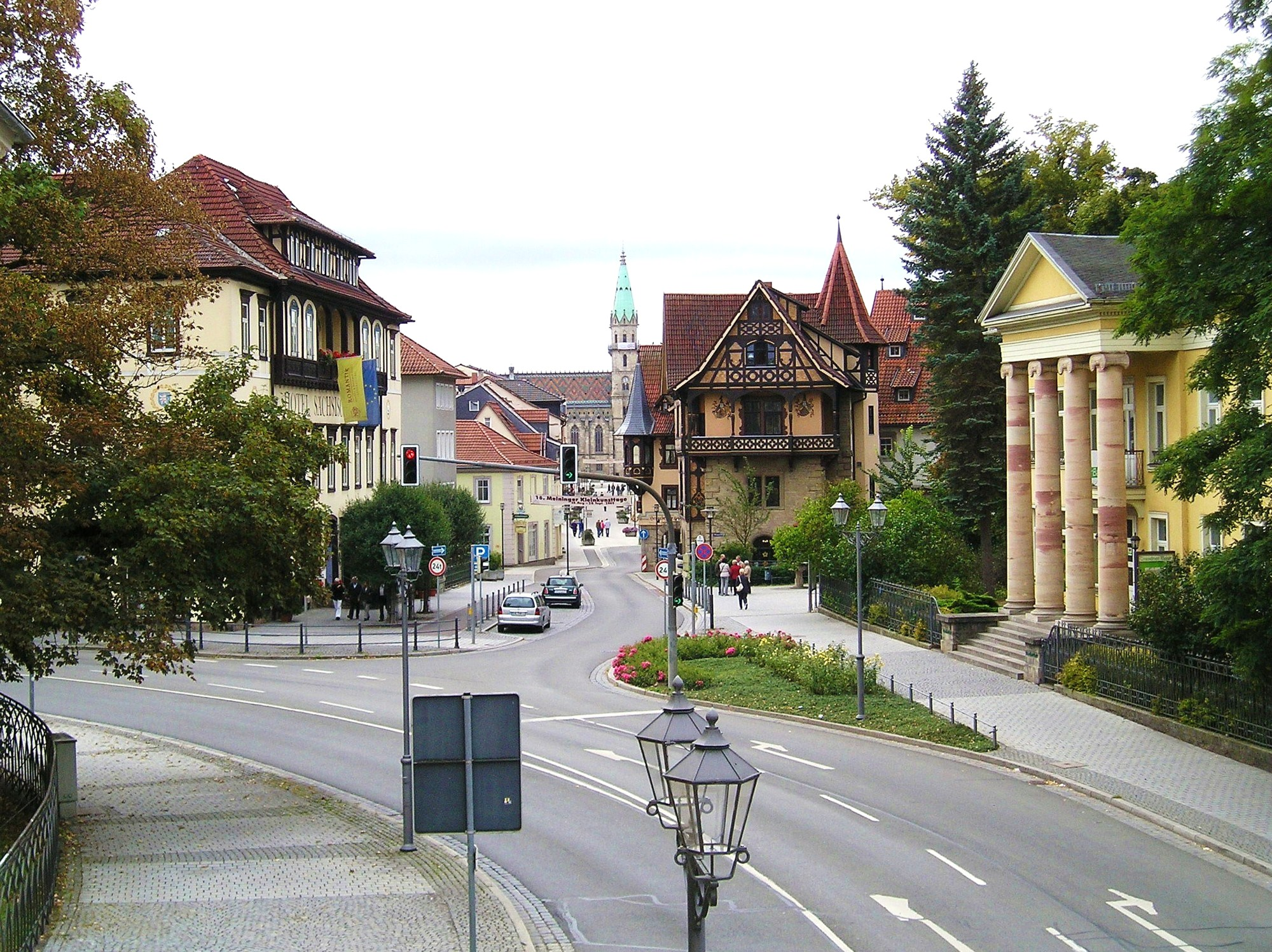
Georgstreet

Meiningen has an urban townscape typical of a residence town. The town has a historic downtown, neoclassicist streets and extensive parks in the town center. Around the center there are residential areas.

The historic old town is still surrounded by parts of the town wall with moats. It originated mainly in the 12th and 13th centuries. Several times in the town's past, large-scale fires or wars destroyed many buildings. A great fire destroyed nearly half the town's old quarter in September 1874. This part was rebuilt in the Neoclassical style with ornate buildings and straight streets. This style also characterizes the main shopping street, Georgstraße. In other parts of the old town half-timbered houses from the 16th to 17th century and large mansions from the 18th to the 19th century still predominate. Since 1990, some modern new buildings were added. The center is dominated by the Stadtkirche (town church). In the western part, the townscape has formed around Schloss Elisabethenburg.

The old town is surrounded by residential and business districts with neoclassical villas and palaces that were built in the 19th and 20th centuries, including the theater and several large bank buildings. North of the old town is the English Garden. In the north and south of the town are the industrial areas and shopping centers. While the town center and densely built-up residential areas are in the valley, many residential areas are situated on the hill slopes.

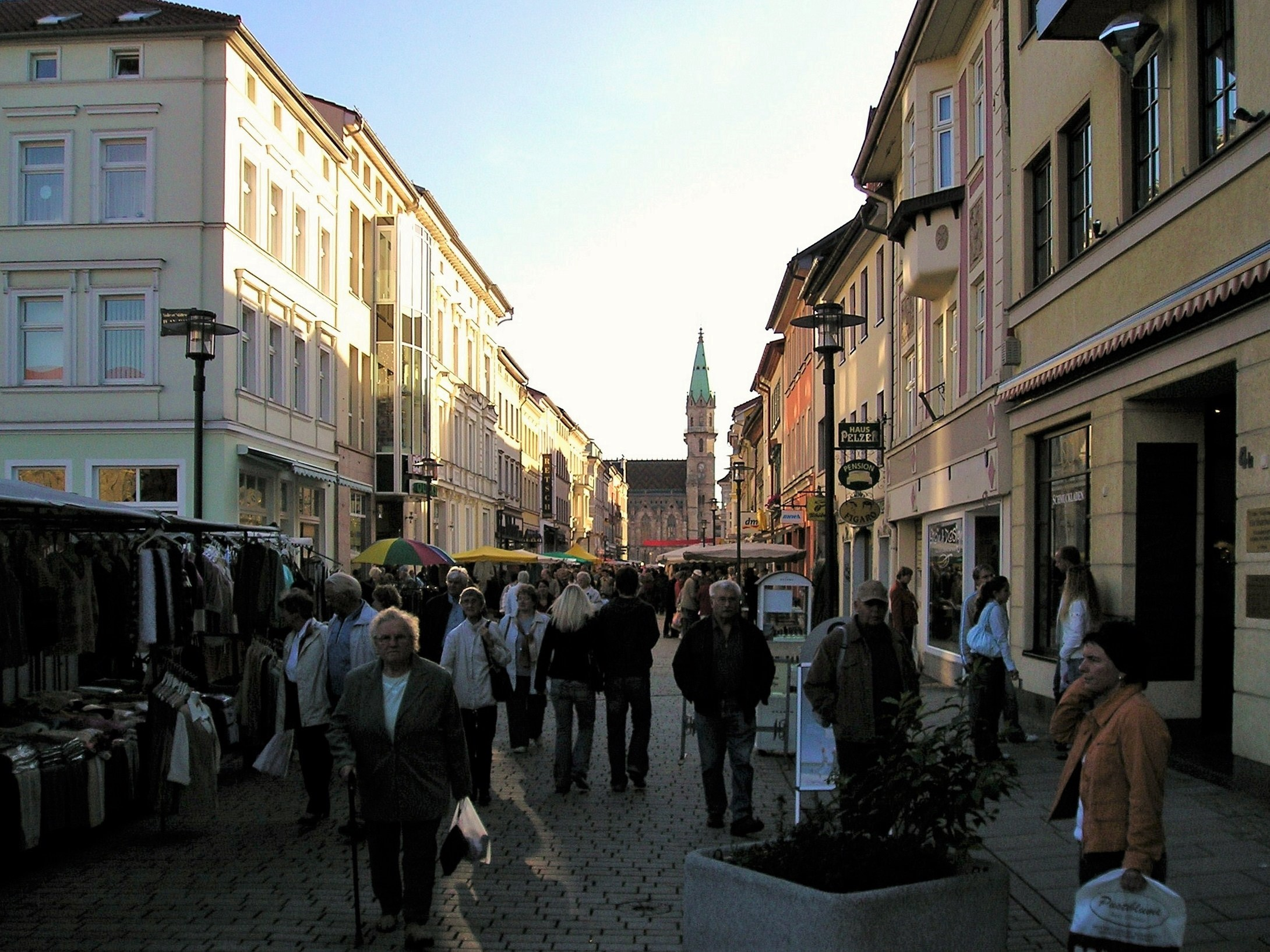
Shopping street Georgstraße

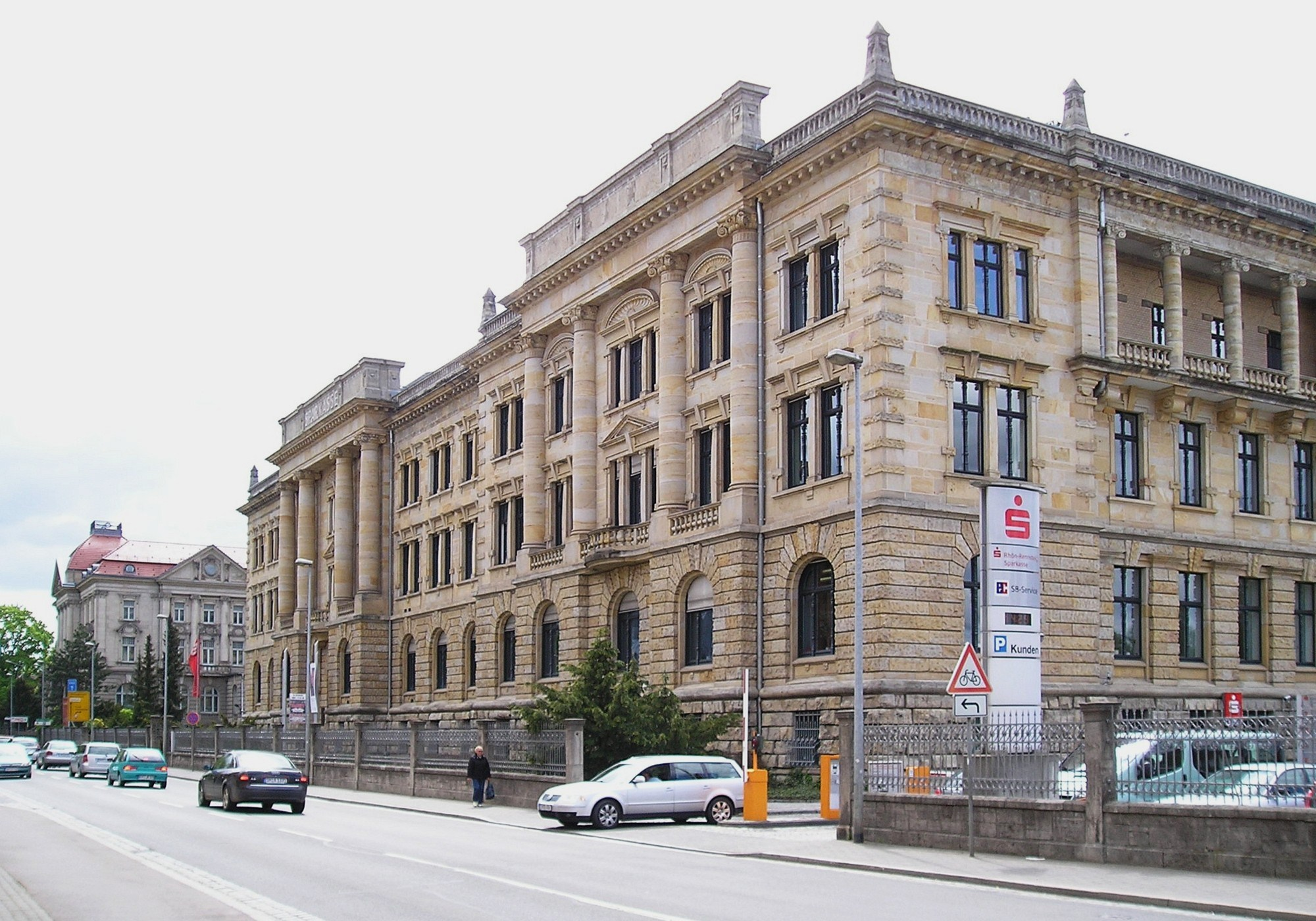
Bank buildings

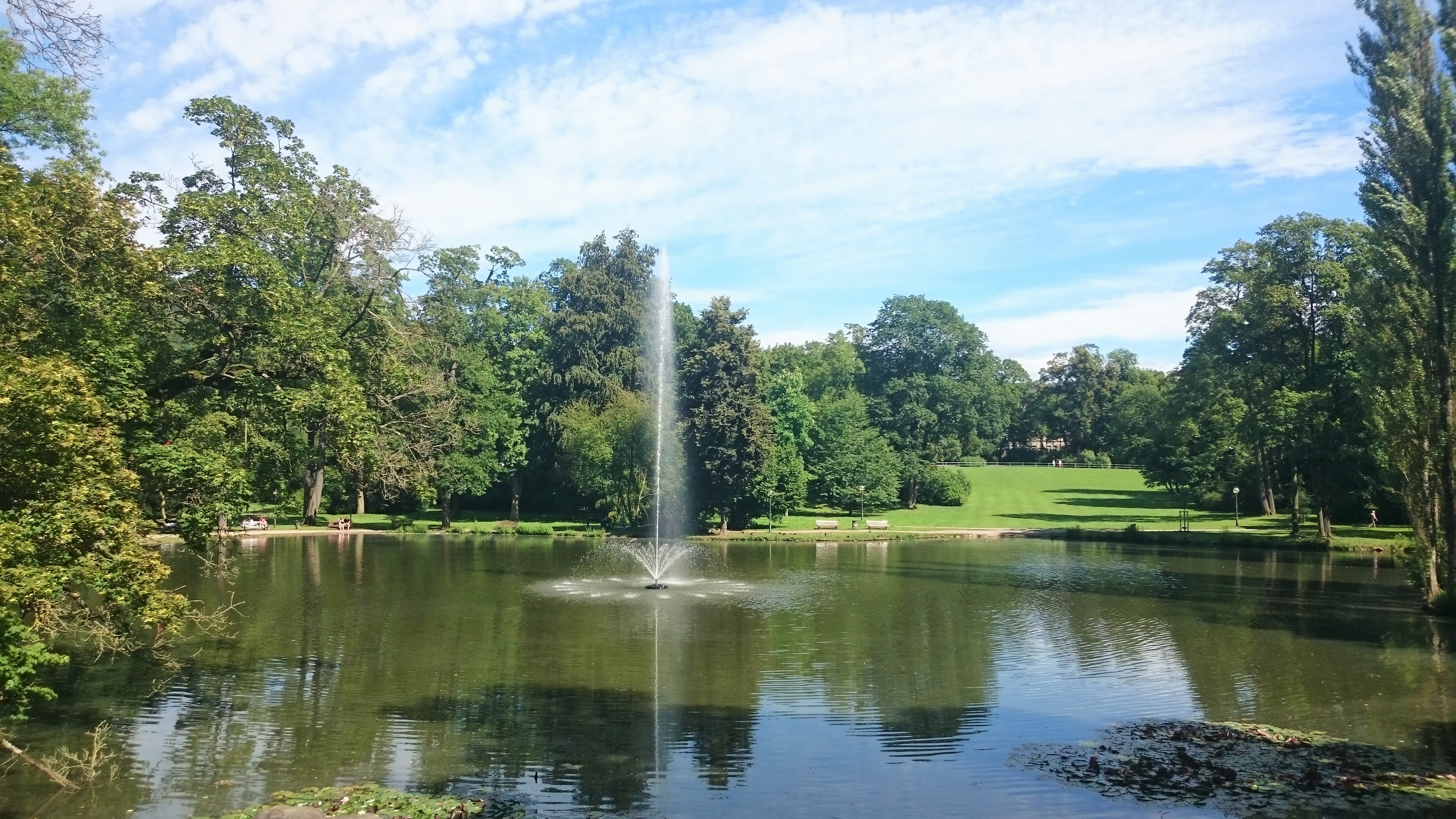
The English Garden in the town center

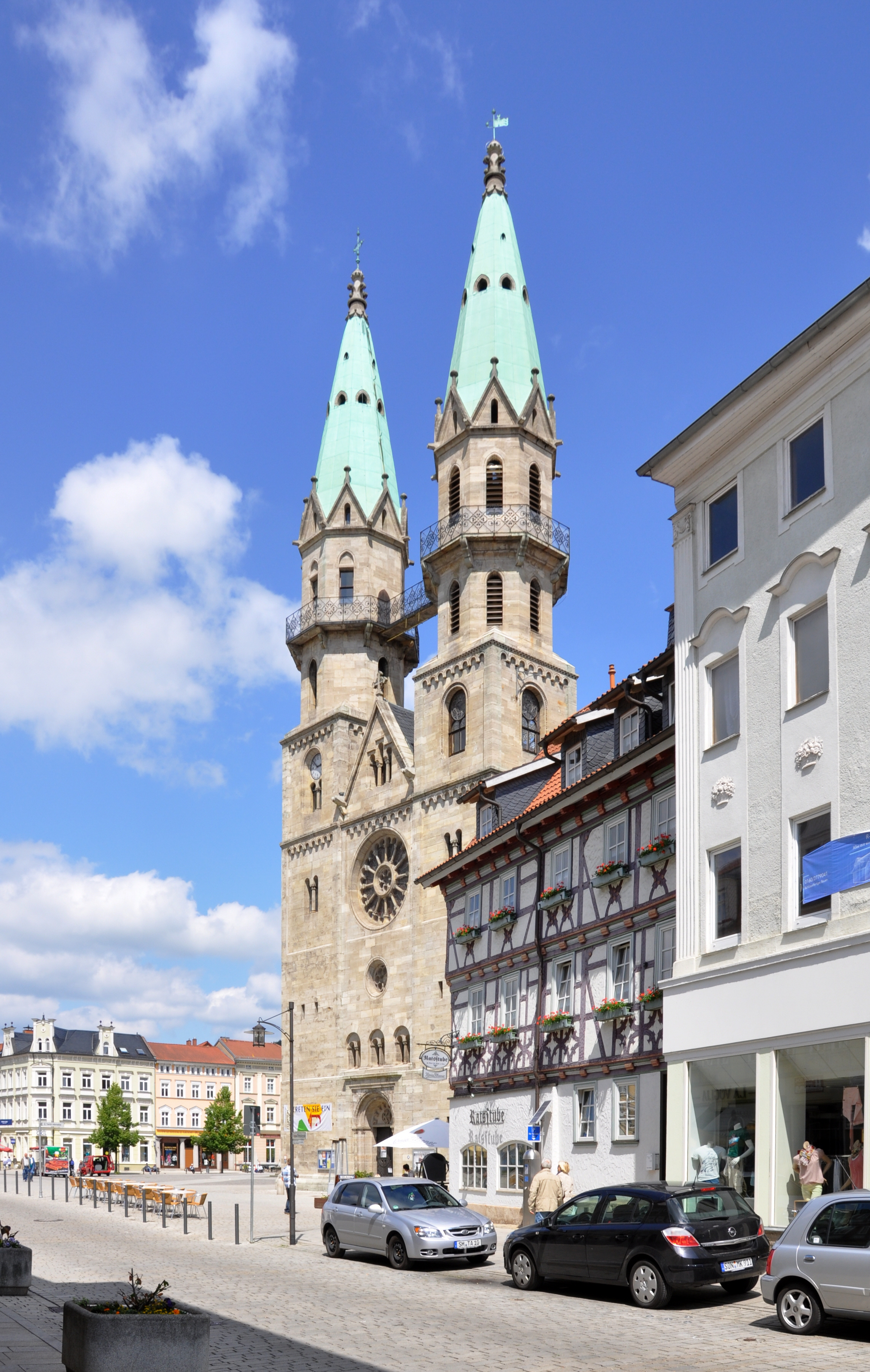
Stadtkirche with half-timbered house

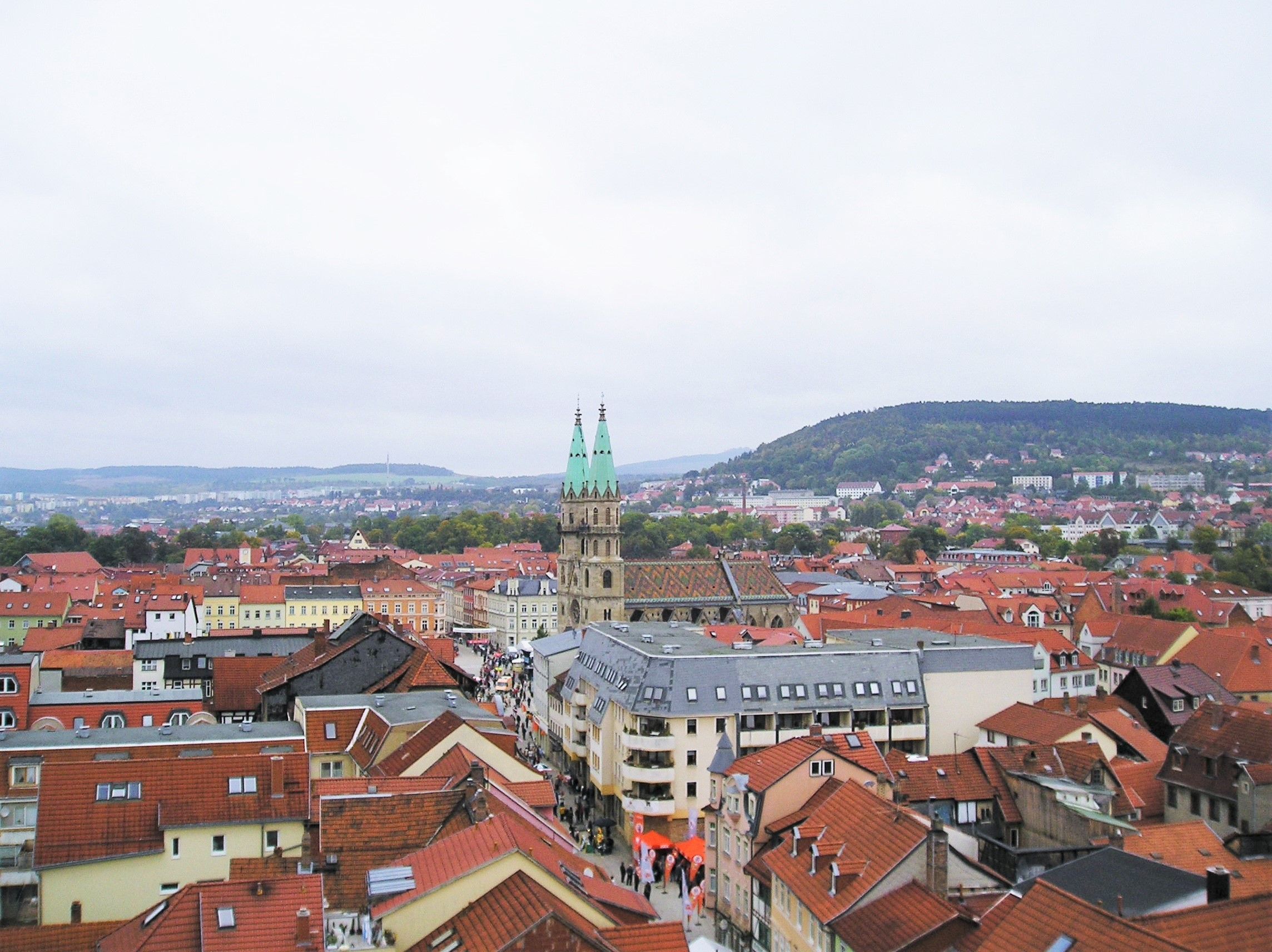
View of the town

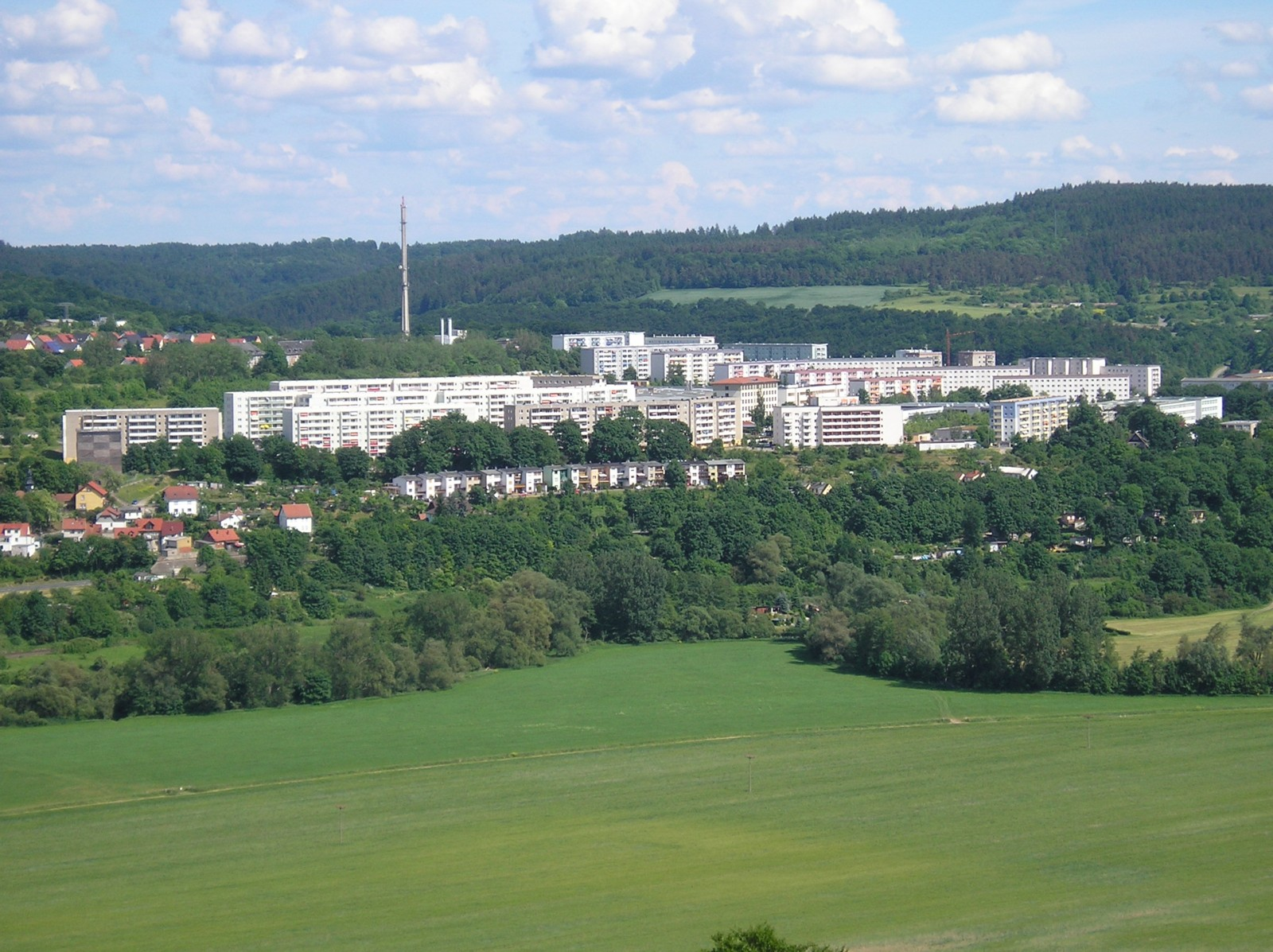
Meiningen-Jerusalem

=== Castles and palaces ===
- Schloss Elisabethenburg palace, built 1682–1692, a Baroque castle with three wings and Hofkapelle(castle chapel) and a rotunda. This is the former seat of the Dukes of Saxe-Meiningen. Today the palace houses museums, the town hall, the concert hall Johannes Brahms, wedding room, the restaurant Schloßstuben, a tower cafe, the town archives and the state archives.It is now a museum of German History.
- Schloss Landsberg, built 1840 for Duke Bernhard II, inspired by visits to his sister Adelheid, queen consort of the United Kingdom. Built under the direction of architect August Wilhelm Döbner in Gothic revival style.
- Kleines Palais (Little Palace), built in 1821. The Little Palace (also known as Princess Palace) is a Neoclassical palace of the Dukes of Saxe-Meiningen. Duke Bernhard II had it built by the architect Johann Andreas Schaubach as his summer palace.
- Großes Palais (Great Palace), built 1823. The palace was built in Neoclassical style by architect Johann Andreas Schaubach as widow seat for the Duchess Luise Eleonore. In 1863, it was renovated and expanded in the Neo-Renaissance style under the direction of architect Otto Hoppe.
- Strupp Villa, mansion in the Neoclassical style, built for the banker Gustav Strupp in 1909 to a design by architect Karl Behlert.
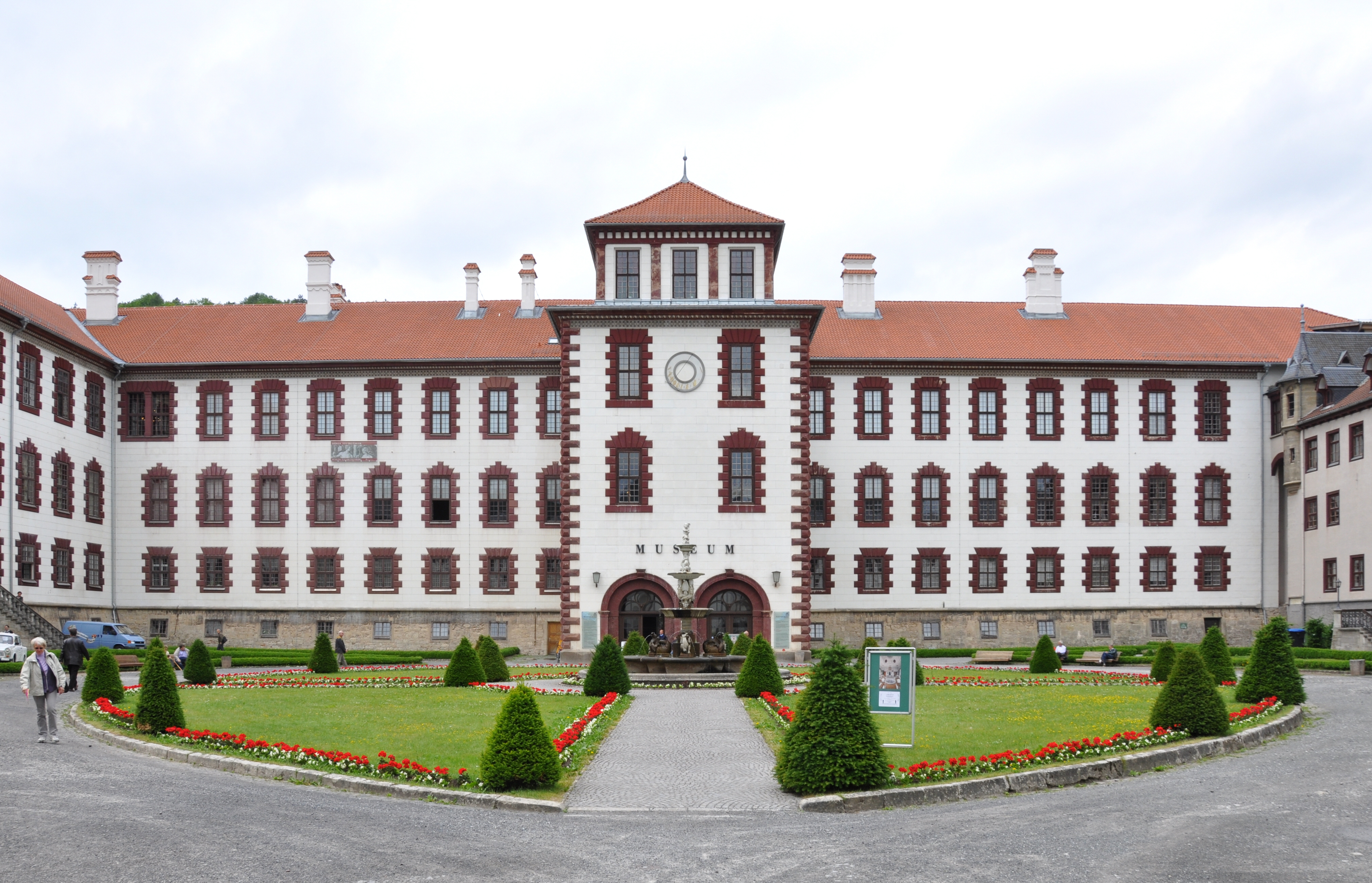
Schloss Elisabethenburg (castle)

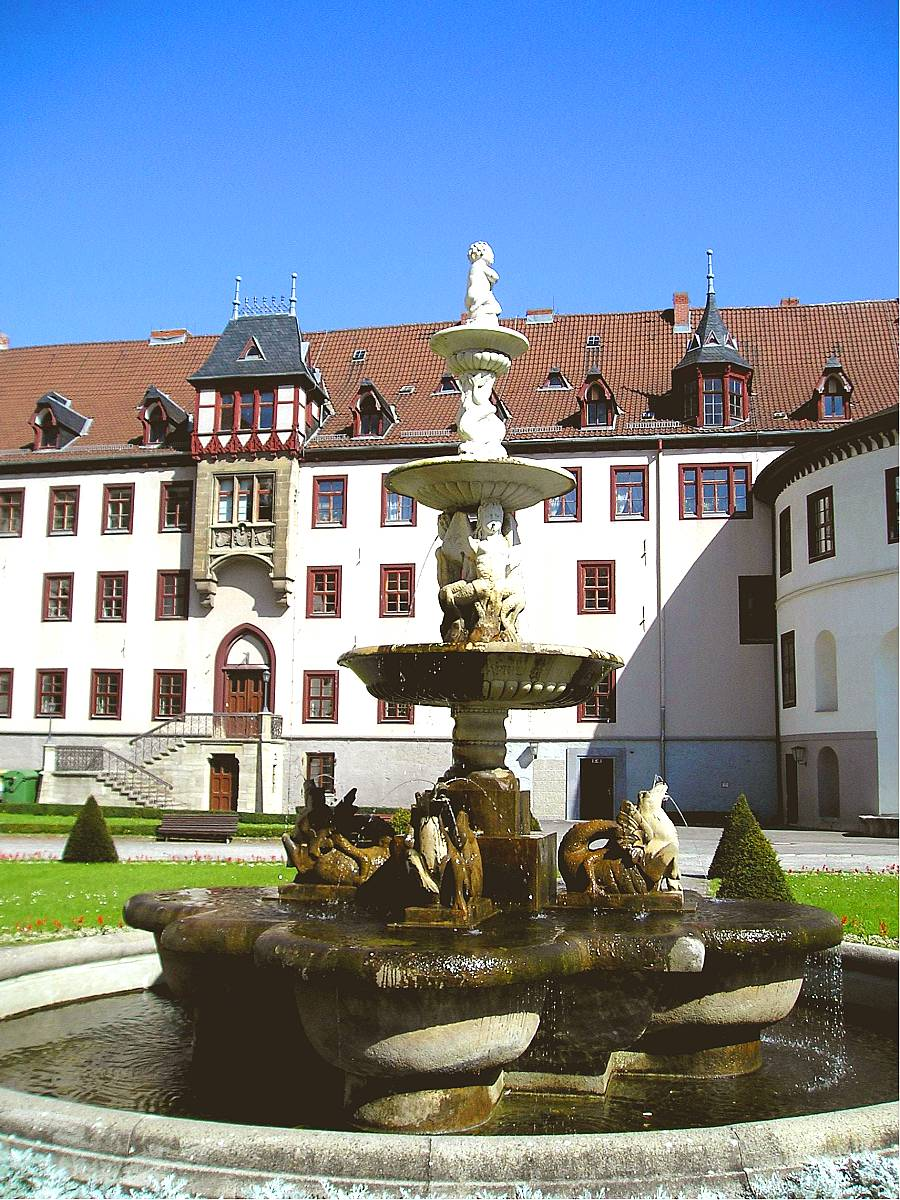
Schloss Elisabethenburg, courtyard with fountain

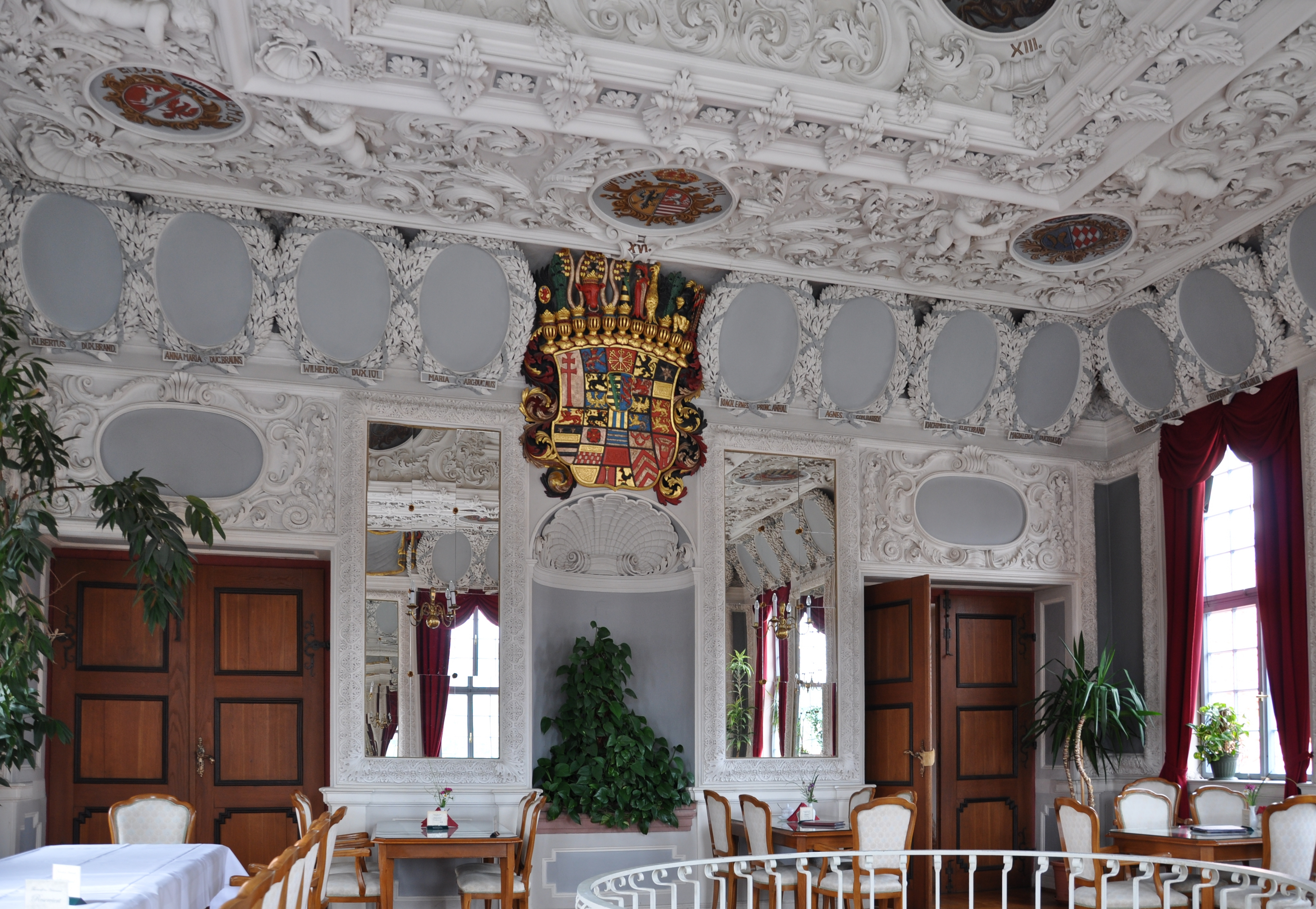
Schloss Elisabethenburg, baroque Hesse hall

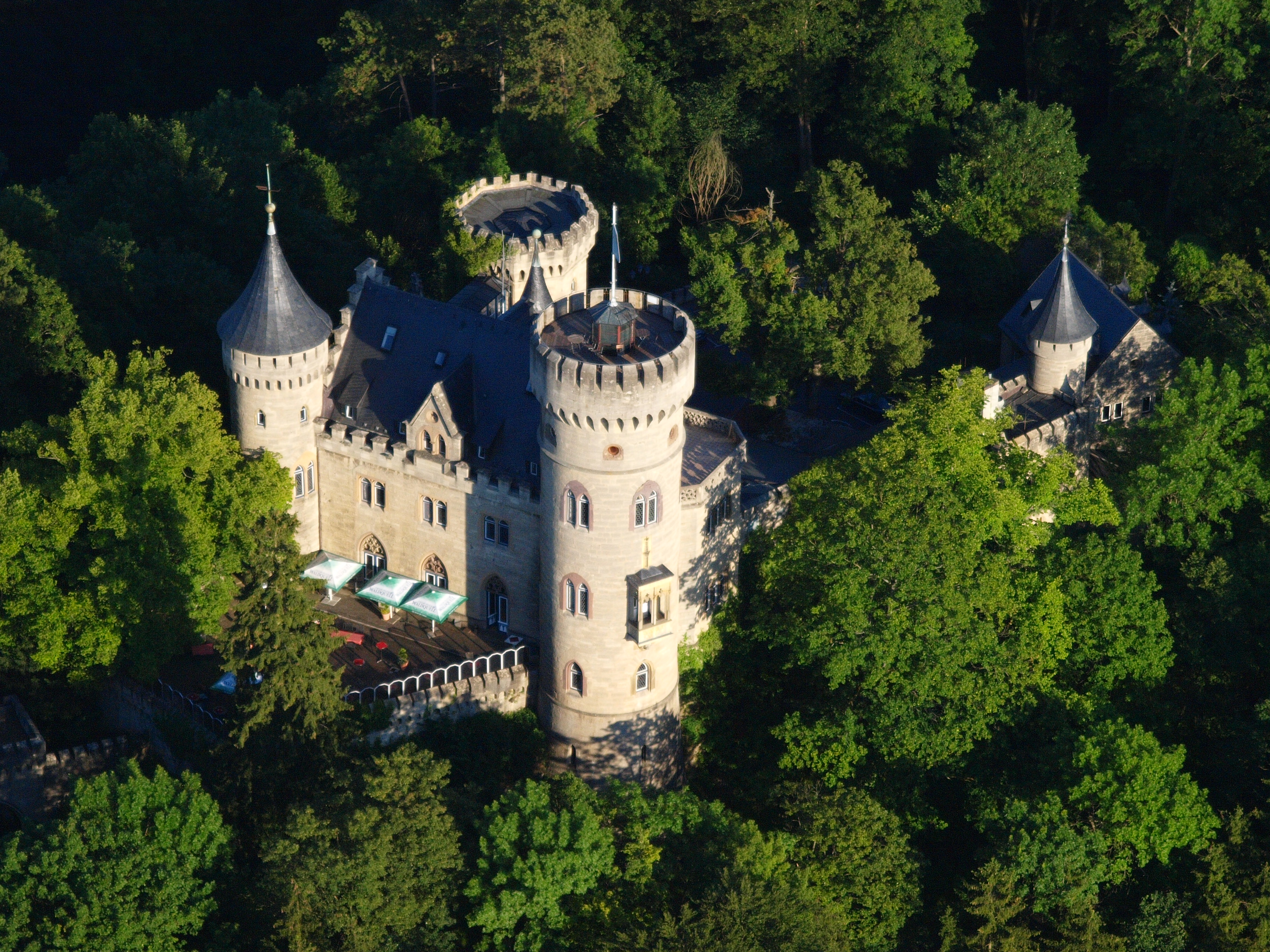
Schloss Landsberg

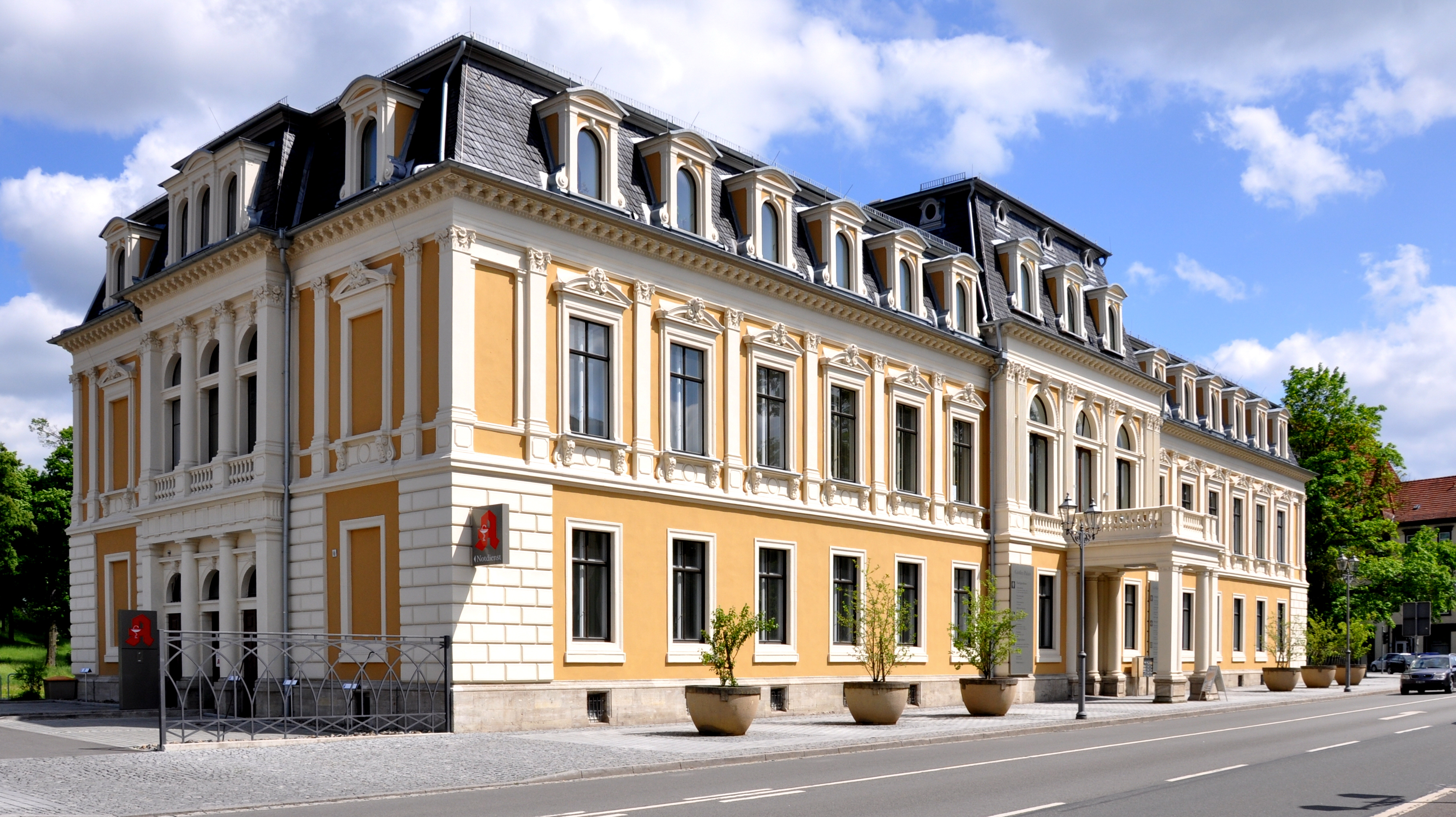
Großes Palais

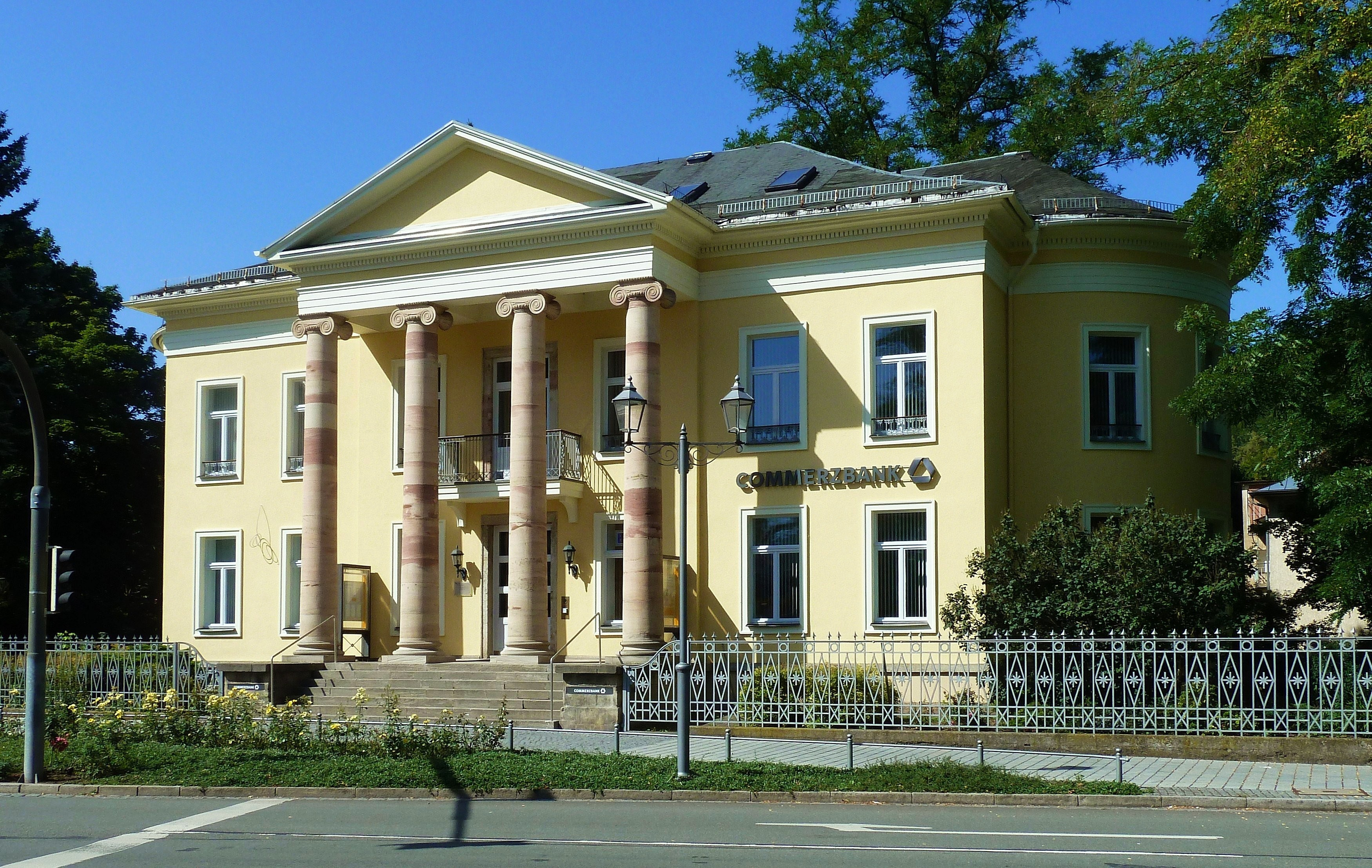
Kleines Palais

=== Churches ===
- Protestant parish church of Our Lady (Stadtkirche, town church), with foundations from the year 1000. The church received its present (Gothic revival) form after conversion in between 1884 and 1889.
- Catholic Church Our Lady, built in 1972.
- Castle Church, baroque style, located in the south wing of Schloss Elisabethenburg, today a concert hall.
- Crypt Chapel in Gothic revival style in the English Garden, built in 1839–41 as a burial place for the ducal family.

=== Fountains and monuments ===
- Bechstein Fountain, also called Märchenbrunnen (fairy tale fountain). The poet and collector of fairy tales lived in Meiningen. In his honour, the fountain by Robert Diez was erected in the English Garden in 1909.
- Heinrichsbrunnen (Emperor Henry II Fountain), considered to be the founder of the local church. Built in 1872, the fountain is located in the marketplace.
- Fountain Chapel, very old fountain in the small square at the chapel.
- Monument to Johannes Brahms. The monument from 1898/99 is the work of sculptor Adolf von Hildebrand (1847–1921) from Munich. It was the first monument honouring Brahms in Germany.
- Monument to Jean Paul, located in English Garden, built in 1858.
- Monument to Max Reger, it has been standing in the English Garden since 1935.
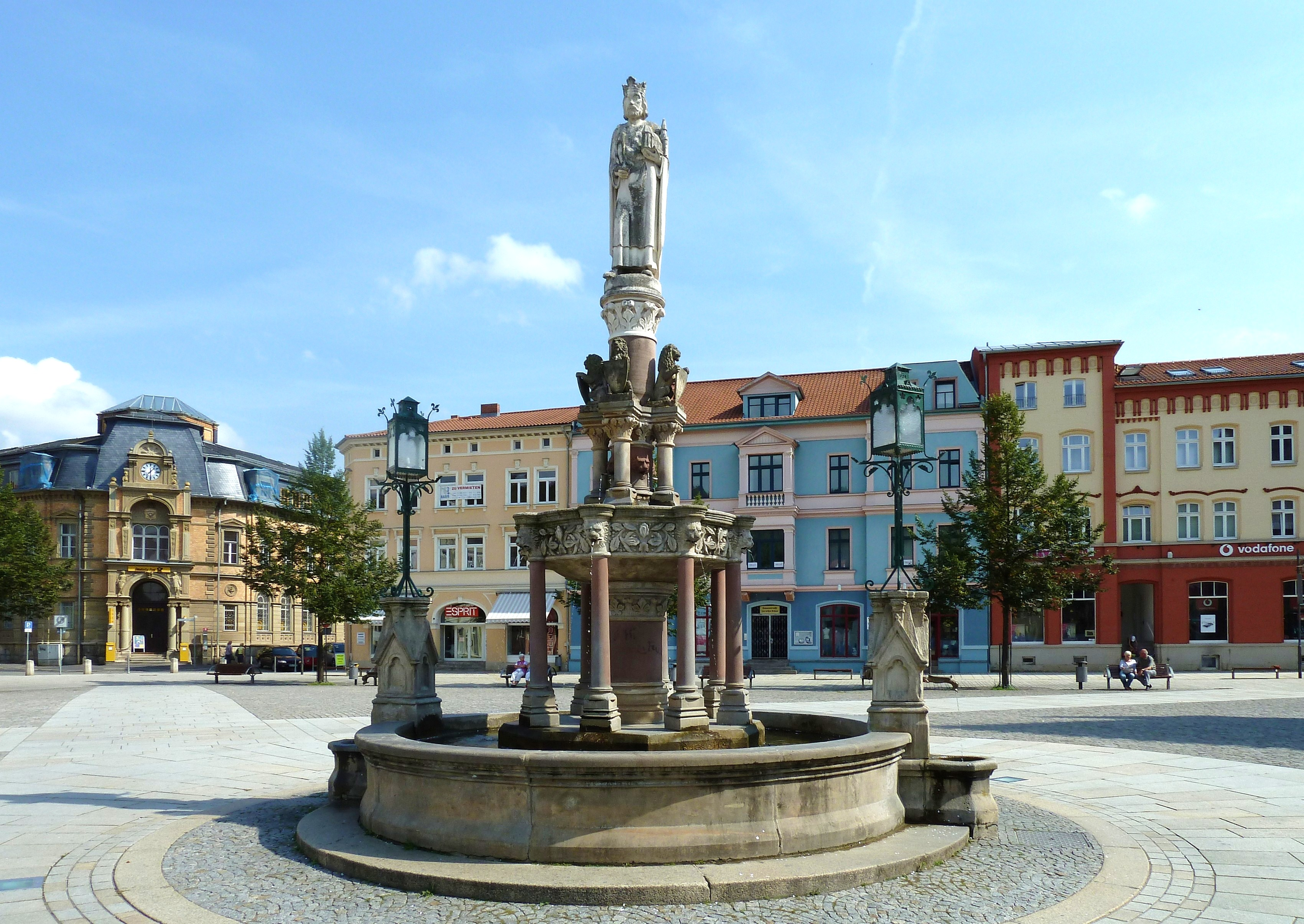
Emperor Henry II fountain

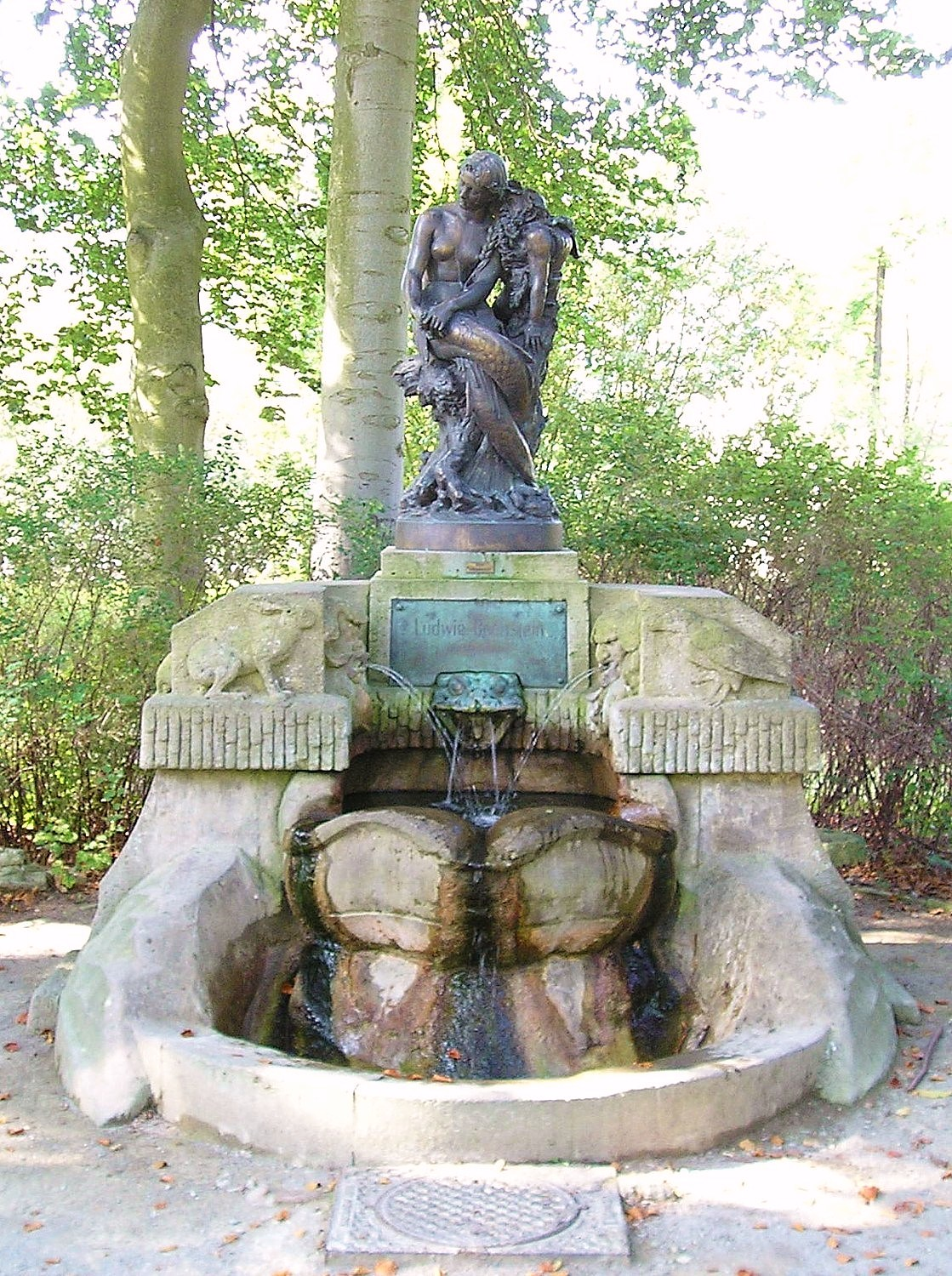
Bechstein fountain

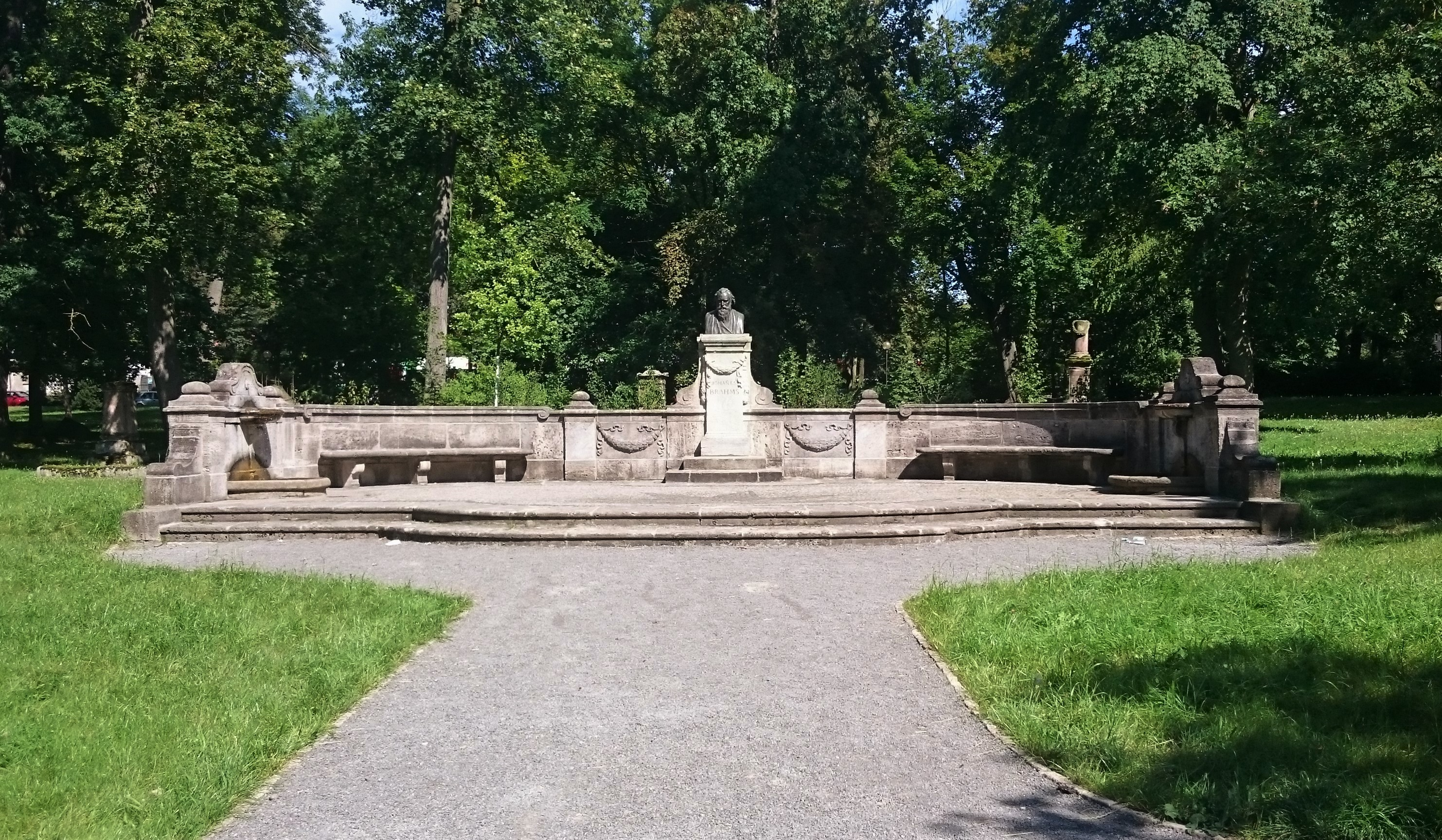
Monument to Johannes Brahms

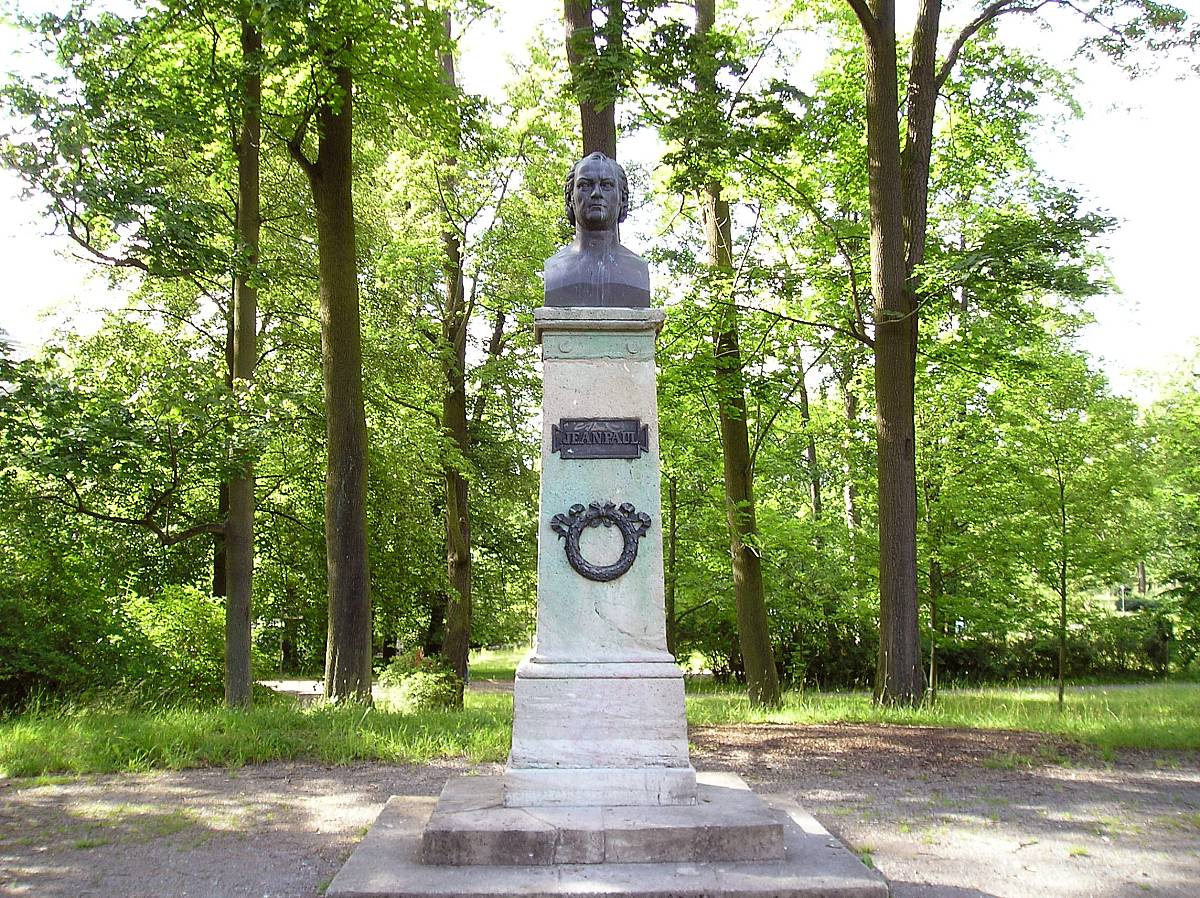
Monument to Jean Paul

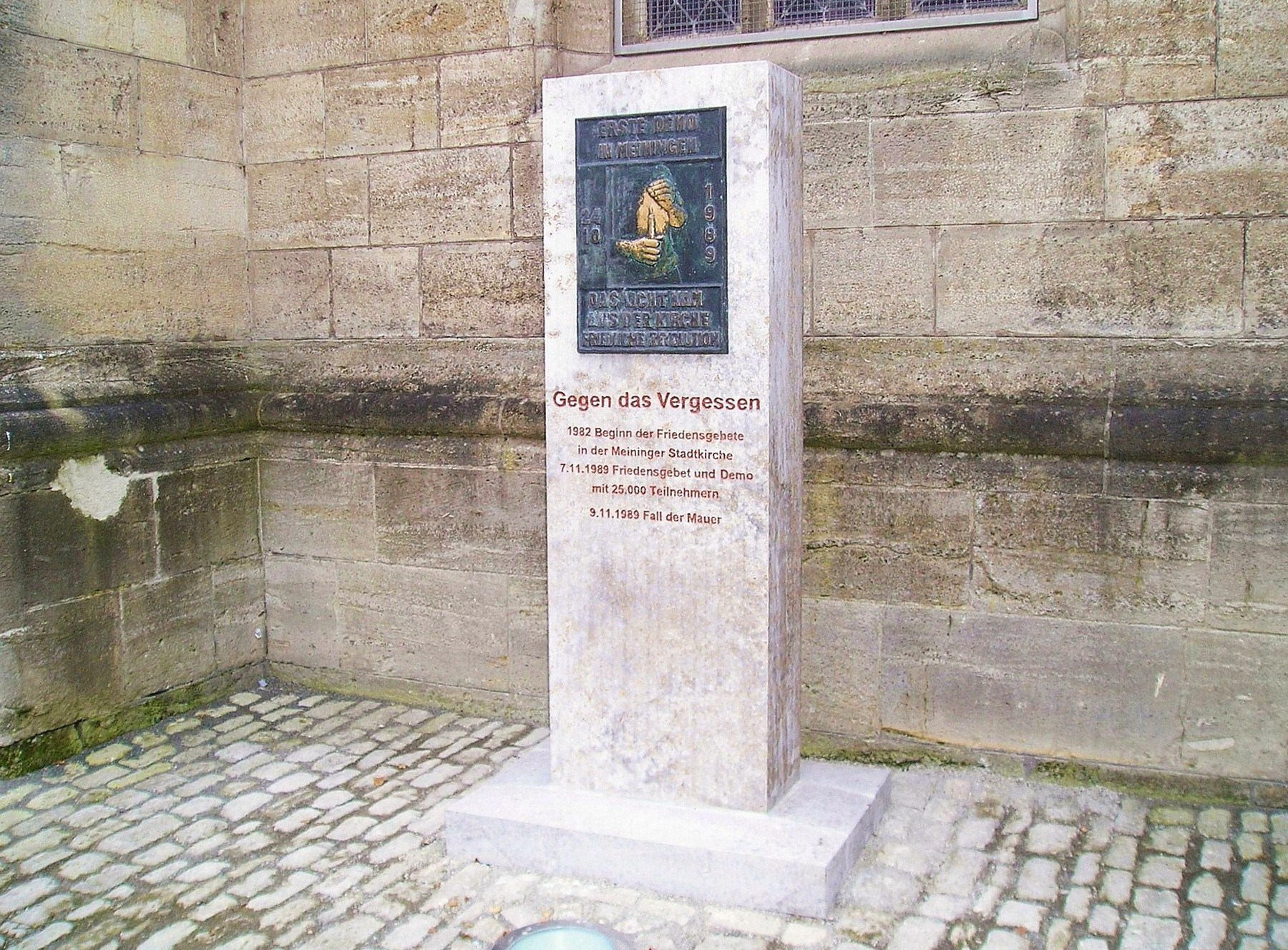
Die Wende 1989 in Meiningen

=== Other landmarks ===
- Goetz-Höhle, guided cave tours. Largest accessible gap cave in Europe with 50-metre high clefts. The cave was discovered in 1915 by Reinhold Goetz in his mountain garden and has been open to the public since 1934.
- The English Garden is located in the town center and was created in 1782. The park was several times altered and enlarged in the 19th century.
- Districts in the Neoclassical style. A large part of the old town was rebuilt after a fire with stately buildings in the style of the period (Gründerzeit).
- Some half-timbered houses (examples: Büchnersches Hinterhaus, Henneberg Haus, Hartung Haus, Rassmann Haus)
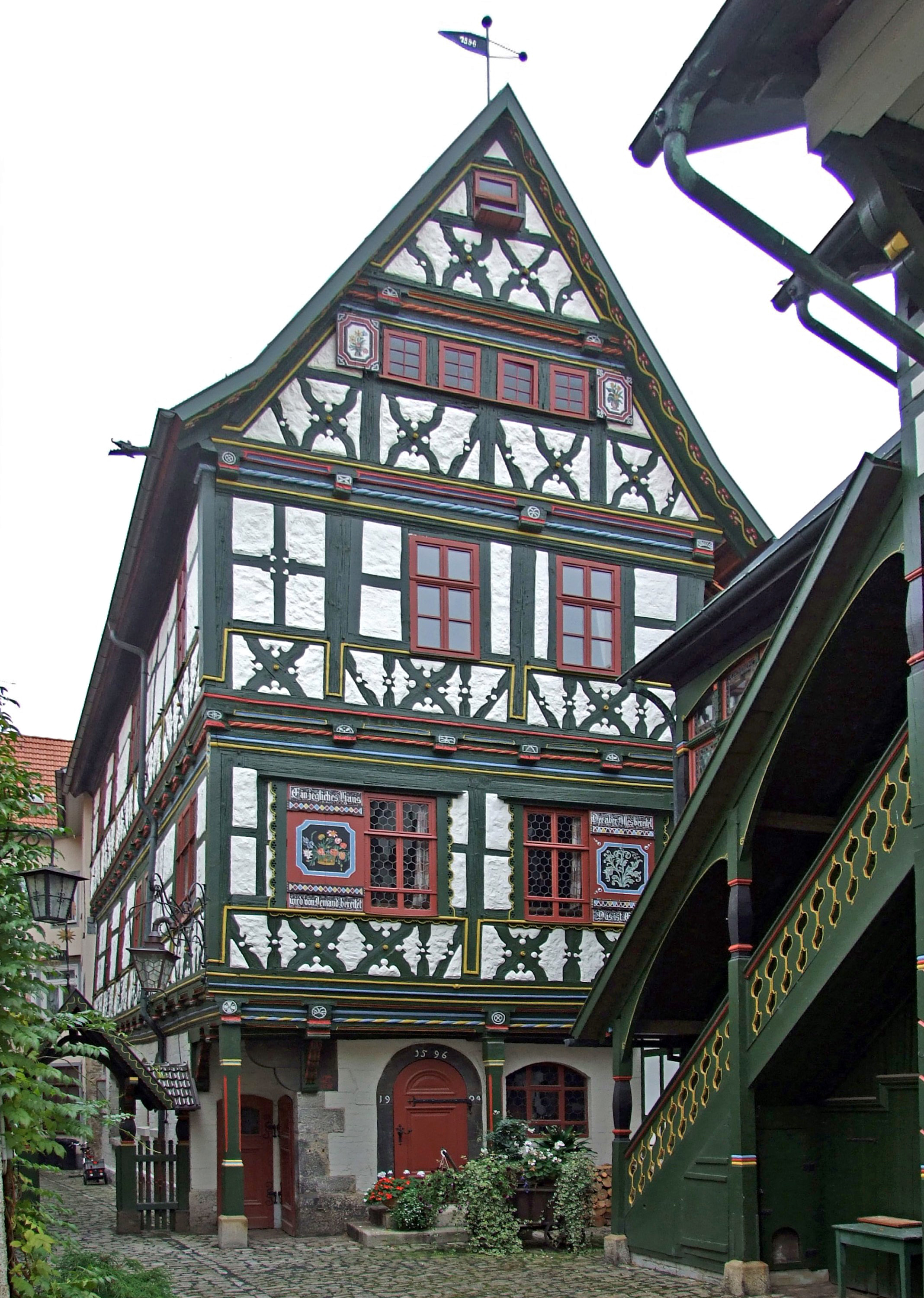
Büchnersches Hinterhaus

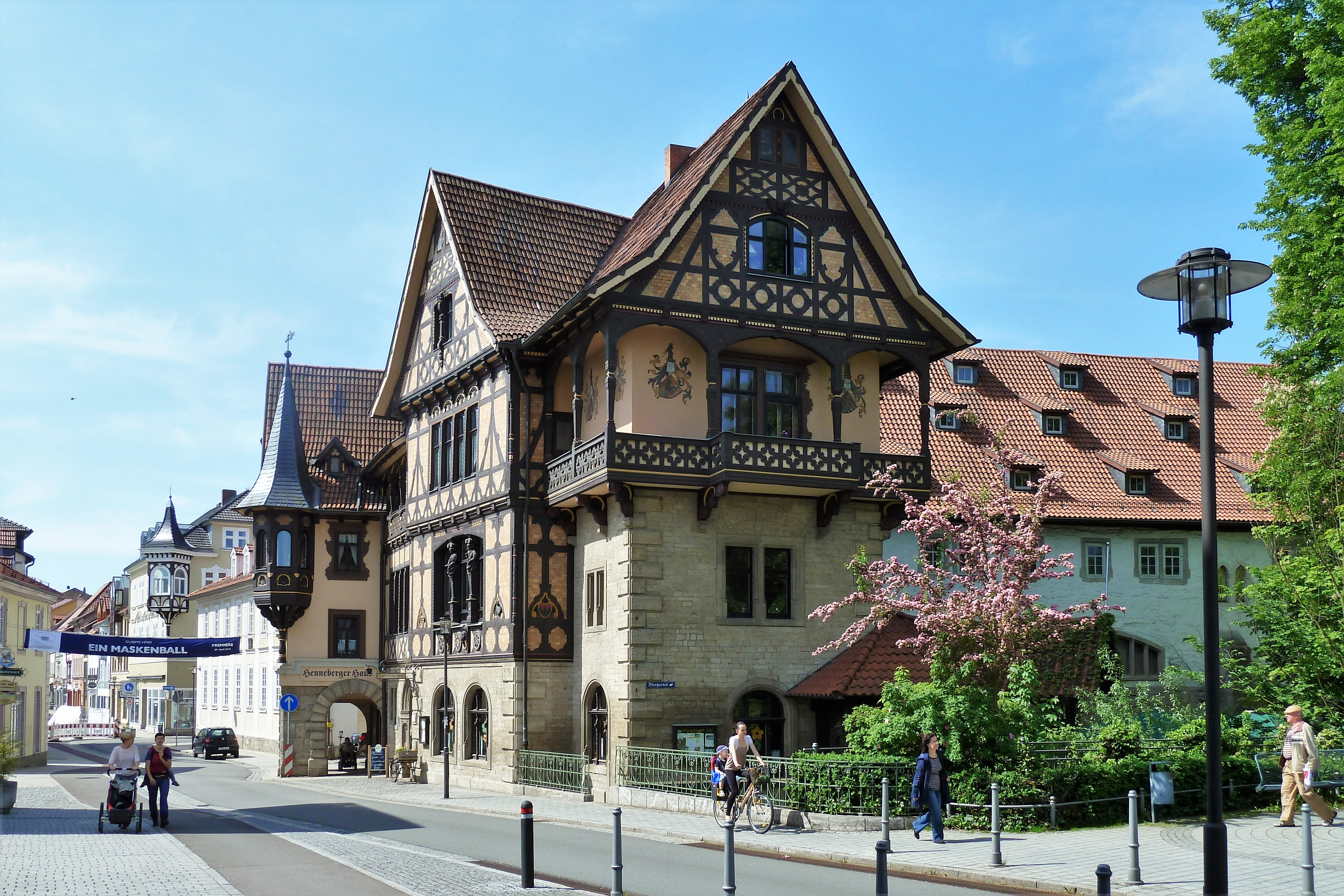
Henneberger Haus

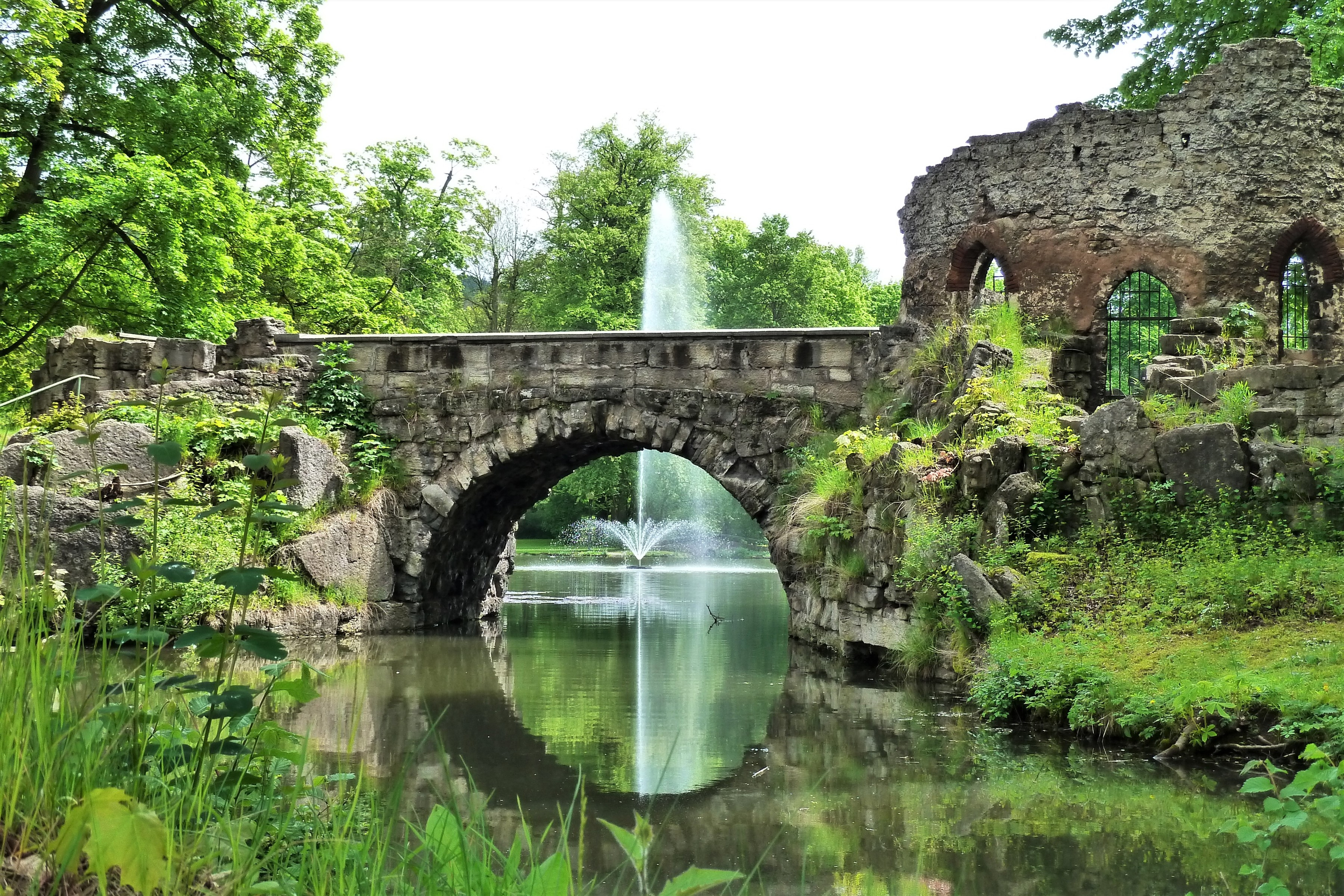
Artificial ruins at the English Garden (from 1793/94)

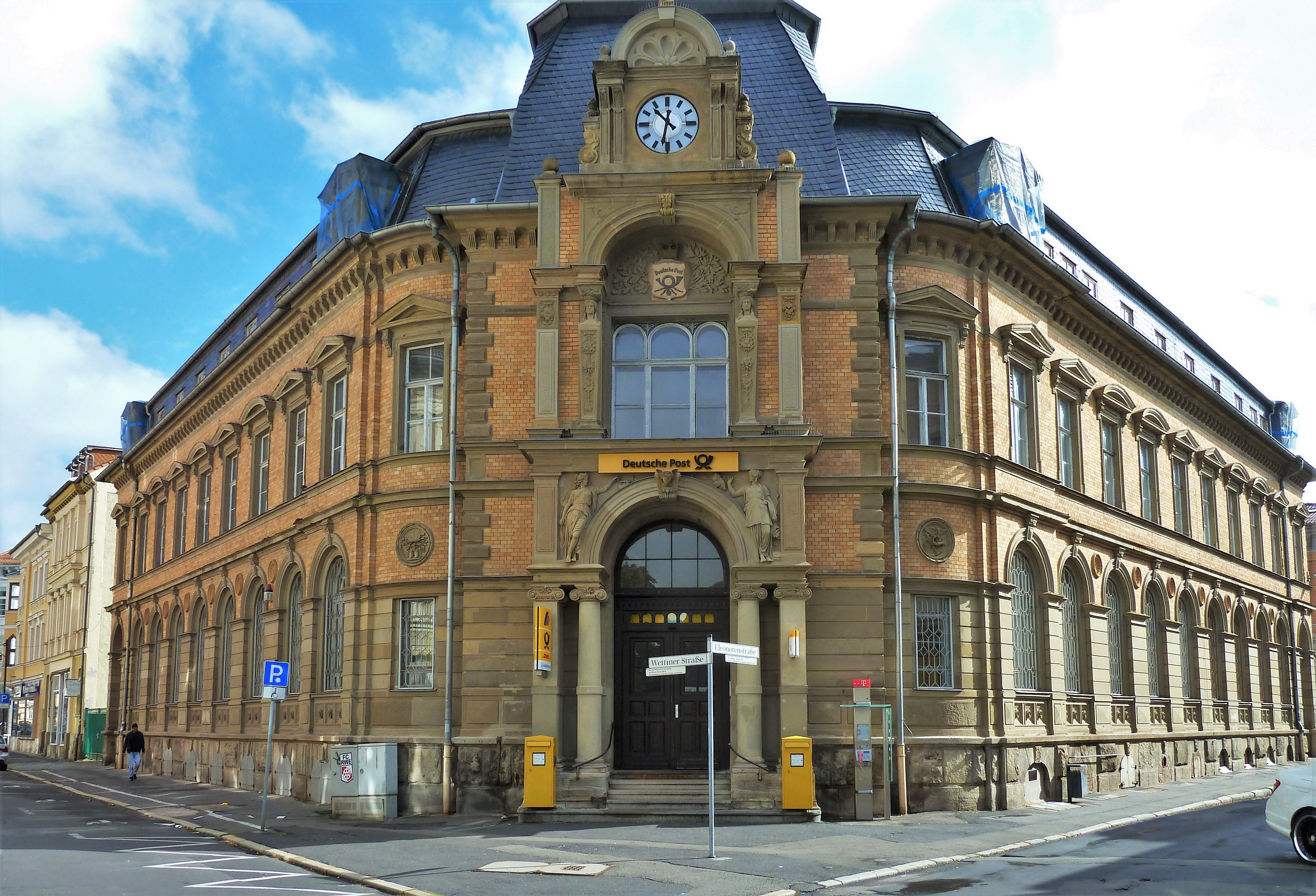
post office

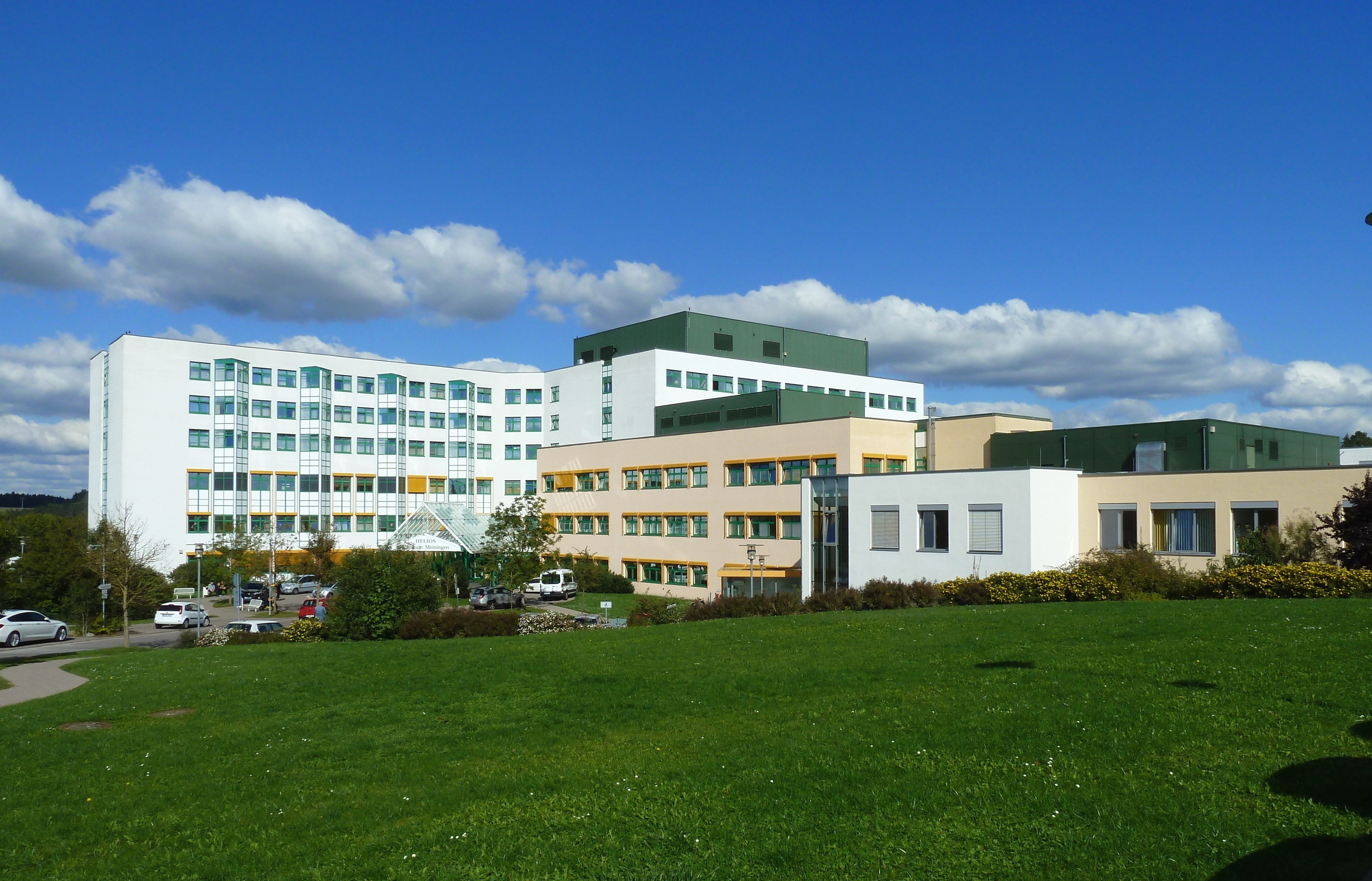
hospital

== Government ==
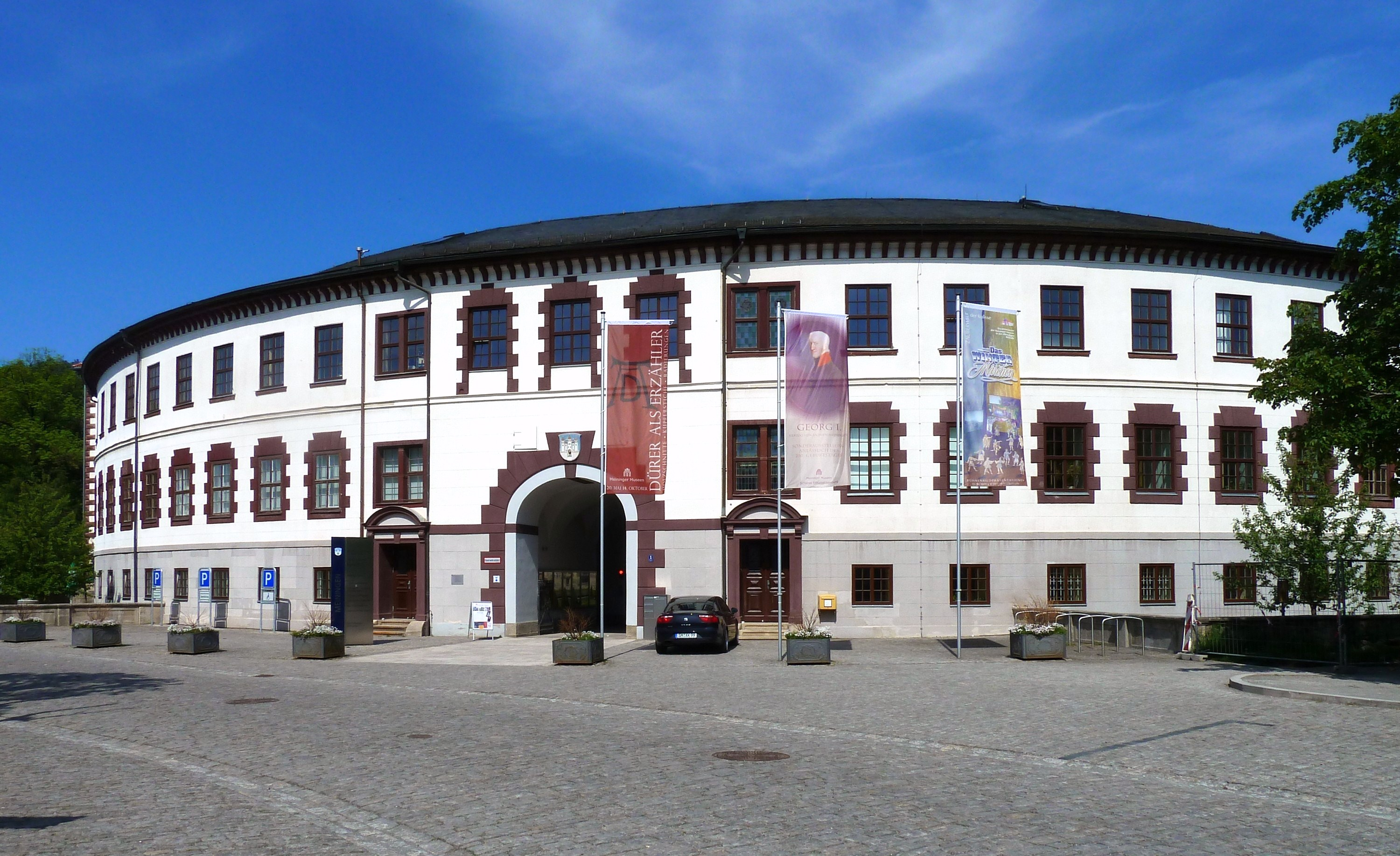
Town hall in Schloss Elisabethenburg

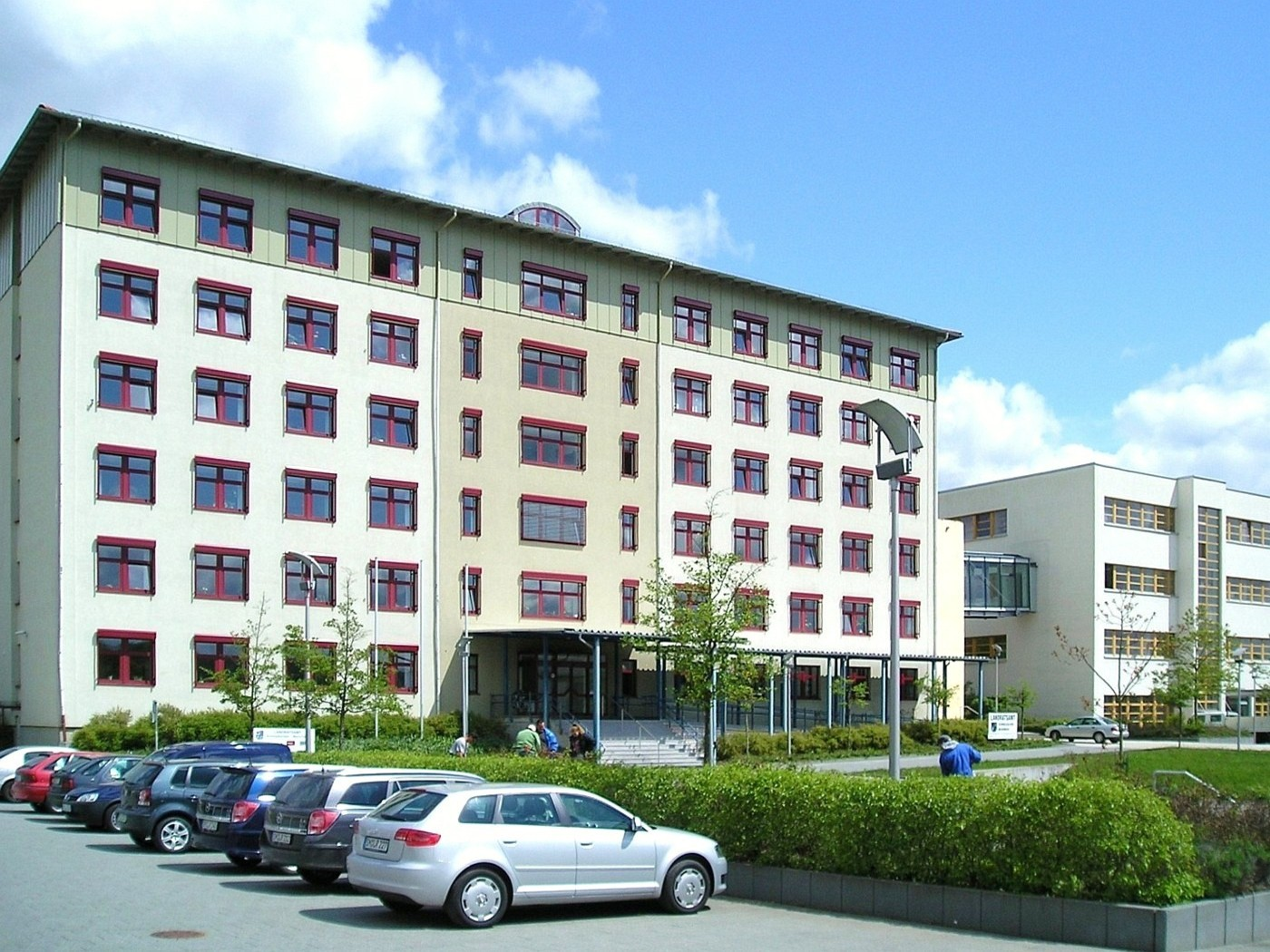
District office

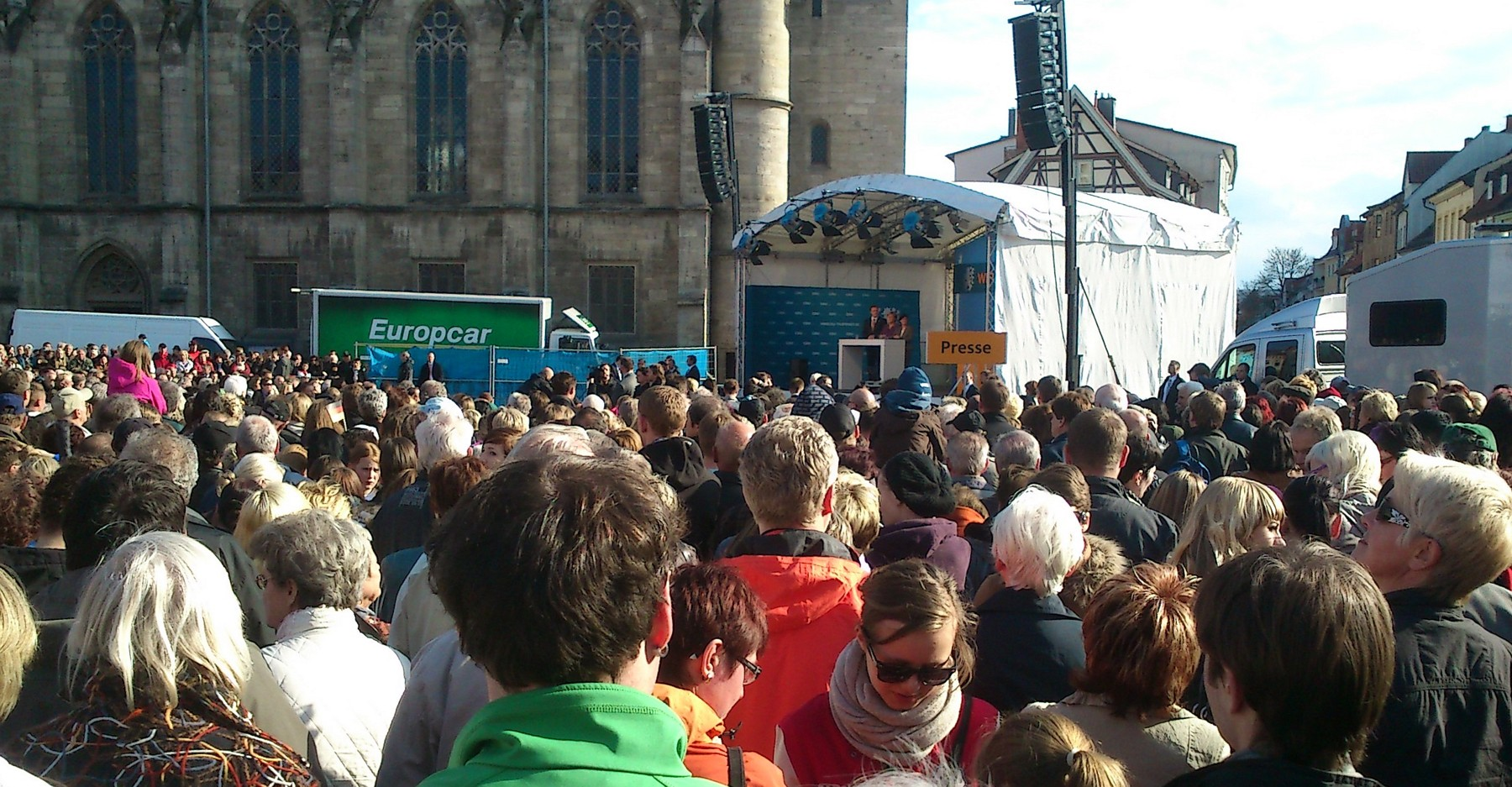
German chancellor Angela Merkel in Meiningen, 2012

Meiningen is the district town of the Kreis Schmalkalden-Meiningen. The town functions as a major center of southern Thuringia in a number of ways (justice (Landgericht Meiningen, Amtsgericht Meiningen), state theater, state archives, hospitals).

=== Mayor and town council ===
The current mayor Fabian Giesder, SPD has been in office since 2012. His predecessor was Reinhard Kupitz, Freie Wähler (in office 1992–2012).

=== Election results ===
The last municipal election was held in 2014 with the result:

Party	Percentage	Seats	Seats in council
SPD	26.5	8	10*
CDU	23.7	7	7
The Left	16.8	5	5
Pro Meiningen	15.7	5	4*
Greens	7.9	2	2
NPD	3.2	1	–**
Herpf	2.8	1	1
Dreißigacker	2.2	1	–*

* The holders of one seat from Pro Meiningen and the one from Dreißigacker switched in June 2014 to SPD. / ** until 15 February 2015 (resigned).

=== Town twinning ===
Meiningen is twinned with:

- Neu-Ulm, Germany, since 1988
- Bussy-Saint-Georges, France, since 2006
- Obertshausen, Germany, since 2007
- Meiningen (Vorarlberg), Austria, since 2012

Friendly relations also exist with the city of Adelaide in Australia because it was named for Queen Adelaide (Queen of the United Kingdom), born and raised in Meiningen as Princess Adelaide of Saxe-Meiningen.

== Infrastructure ==
=== Transport ===
Road

Meiningen is located at the Bundesautobahn 71 (Sangerhausen–Erfurt–Schweinfurt) with two motorway junction. Furthermore, there are two Bundesstrassen (federal roads): to Eisenach and Würzburg (B 19) and to Sonneberg and Kronach (B 89) as well as some regional roads to Fulda in Hesse, Suhl in Thuringia and Mellrichstadt in Bavaria. A bypass road around Meiningen was built in the 2000s in the east; its northeastern extension is in planning.

Railway

Meiningen has been a railway node since the late 19th century. The Werra Railway was opened in 1858, the Schweinfurt–Meiningen railway in 1874 and the Neudietendorf–Ritschenhausen railway from Erfurt in 1884. Meiningen station was built in 1858. The Bavarian station was added as the second train station in 1874. There are direct train services to Erfurt, Eisenach, Sonneberg and Schweinfurt.

Bus

Urban transport is operated by bus routes. There are 13 lines with about 100 stops, serving all parts of the town.

Bike

There are several long-distance cycling trails, the first Werratal-Radweg along the Werra valley from the Thuringian Forest to the river Weser, the second Main-Werra-Radweg from Meiningen to Würzburg on the Main river. A third trail goes from Meiningen to Haßfurt in Bavaria.

== Education ==
After reunification, the educational system was reformed. In 1994, the Thuringian Police academy Meiningen was established and in 1998 a Police Hochschule (tertiary education / German name: Fachhochschule Polizei) was added. The campus accommodates about 500 police officers in training. In addition, there are two medical schools and a technical school for Emergency medical technicians. Furthermore, there is one public and one Protestant Gymnasium in Meiningen.

== Notable people ==
=== People born in Meiningen ===
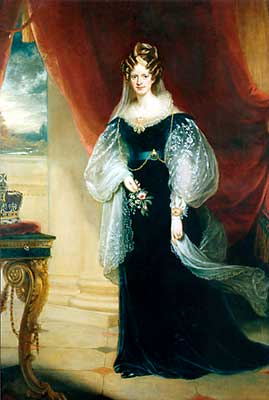
Adelheid von Sachsen-Meiningen (Queen Adelaide)

Duke Georg II

- Peretz Bernstein (1890–1971), Israeli politician
- Matthias Brenner (born 1957), actor, director and writer
- Fritz Diez (1901–1979), actor and producer
- Paul Oskar Höcker (1865–1944), writer
- Kurt May (1896–1992), Lawyer and campaigner against the Nazis
- Bernd Meinunger (born 1944), lyricist and record producer
- Theodor Oberländer (1905–1998), German politician
- Paul Oestreicher (born 1931), Anglican priest and canon emeritus in Coventry
- Princess Elisabeth of Saxe-Altenburg (1865-1927), grand duchess of Russia by marriage
- Princess Adelaide of Saxe-Meiningen (1792–1849), queen consort of the United Kingdom and of Hanover as spouse of William IV of the United Kingdom
- Georg II, Duke of Saxe-Meiningen (1826–1914), "Theatre Duke"
- Fritz Schulz-Reichel (1912–1990), German jazz and pop pianist
- Gunter Sieberth (born 1965), oboist
- Gustav von Vaerst (1894–1975), general
- Johann Georg Walch (1693–1775), Lutheran theologian and philosopher
- Ludwig von Wolzogen (1773–1845), military officer

=== Notable residents ===
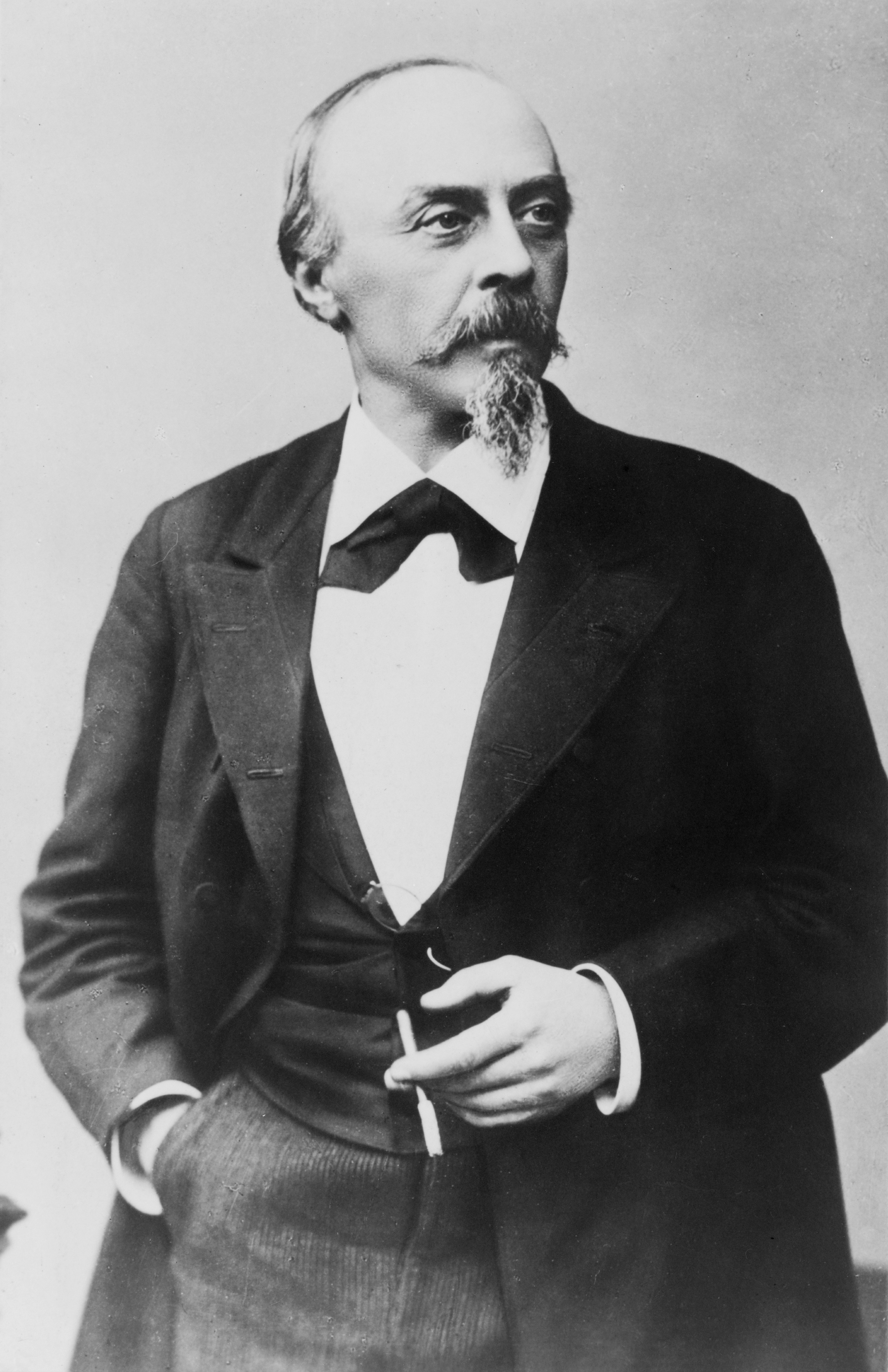
Hans von Bülow

- Albert Bassermann (1867–1952), actor
- Rudolf Baumbach (1840–1905), poet
- Ludwig Bechstein (1801–1860), poet
- Bjørn Bjørnson (1859–1942), actor and director
- Peter Borgelt (1927–1994), actor
- Johannes Brahms (1833–1897), composer, pianist and conductor
- Hans von Bülow (1830–1894), conductor
- Eberhard Esche (1933–2006), actor
- Ellen Franz (1839–1923), (as wife of the Duke: Helene Freifrau von Heldburg), pianist and actress
- Elīna Garanča (born 1976), operatic mezzo-soprano
- Elisabeth Grümmer (1911–1986), operatic lyric soprano
- Josef Kainz (1858–1910), actor
- Carl Kiesewetter (1854–1895), historian, occultist and theosophist
- Karl Korsch (1886–1961), Marxist
- Friedrich Mosengeil (1773–1839), stenographer
- Jean Paul (1763–1825), poet
- Kirill Petrenko (born 1972), conductor
- Max Reger (1873–1916), composer, pianist and conductor
- Friedrich Schiller (1759–1805), poet
- Adele Sandrock (1863–1937), actress
- Richard Strauss (1864–1949), composer and conductor
- Ingrid van Bergen (born 1931), actress
- Johann Wolfgang von Goethe (1749–1832), poet, dramatist, diplomat and philosopher
