= Salzbrücke =

Former municipal association

Coordinates: 50.517°N 10.417°E

Salzbrücke is a former Verwaltungsgemeinschaft ("collective municipality") in the district Schmalkalden-Meiningen, in Thuringia, Germany. The seat of the Verwaltungsgemeinschaft was in Obermaßfeld-Grimmenthal. It was disbanded on 1 January 2012.

The Verwaltungsgemeinschaft Salzbrücke consisted of the following municipalities:

1. Bauerbach
2. Belrieth
3. Einhausen
4. Ellingshausen
5. Leutersdorf
6. Neubrunn
7. Obermaßfeld-Grimmenthal
8. Ritschenhausen
9. Vachdorf
10. Wölfershausen
