= Dolmar (Verwaltungsgemeinschaft) =

Coordinates: 50.617°N 10.517°E

Dolmar is a former Verwaltungsgemeinschaft ("collective municipality") in the district Schmalkalden-Meiningen, in Thuringia, Germany. The seat of the Verwaltungsgemeinschaft was in Schwarza. It was disbanded on 1 January 2012.It was succeeded shortly after

The Verwaltungsgemeinschaft Dolmar consisted of the following municipalities:

1. Christes
2. Dillstädt
3. Kühndorf
4. Rohr
5. Schwarza
6. Utendorf
