= Nordheim =

Nordheim can refer to:

== Places ==
France

- Nordheim, Bas-Rhin, municipality in Alsace

Germany

- Northeim, a city in Lower Saxony, formerly spelled Nordheim
- Nordheim vor der Rhön, a municipality in Bavaria
- Nordheim am Main, a municipality in Bavaria
- Nordheim, Baden-Württemberg, a municipality
- Nordheim, Thuringia, municipality

Norway

- Nordheim, Hordaland, also spelled Norheim, a village in Hordaland county
- Norheim, Rogaland, also spelled Nordheim, a village in Rogaland county

United States

- Nordheim, Texas
- Northeim, Wisconsin, an unincorporated community

== People ==
- Nordheim (surname)

== See also ==
- Nord (disambiguation)
- Norde (disambiguation)
- Norden (disambiguation)
- Norheim (cf.Sondre Norheim)
