= Norheim (disambiguation) =

Norheim may refer to:

== Places ==
- Norheim, a municipality in the Bad Kreuznach district in Rhineland-Palatinate, Germany
- Norheim, Rogaland, a village in the municipality of Karmøy in Rogaland county, Norway
- Norheim Church, a church in the municipality of Karmøy in Rogaland county, Norway
- Nordheim, Vestland, also spelled Norheim, a hamlet in the municipality of Voss in Vestland county, Norway

== People ==
- Norheim (surname)

== See also ==
- Nordheim (disambiguation)
