= Dolmar-Salzbrücke =

- Verwaltungsgemeinschaft
- Map of Schmalkalden-Meiningen highlighting Dolmar-Salzbrücke
- Interactive map of Dolmar-Salzbrücke
- Location within Germany Location within Thuringia
- Coordinates: 50°37′N 10°31′E
- Country: Germany
- State: Thuringia
- District: Schmalkalden-Meiningen
- Seat: Schwarza
- Subdivisions: 14 municipalities

Area
  - Total: 159.69 km^{2} (61.66 sq mi)

Population (2025-12-31)
  - Total: 8,453
  - Density: 52.93/km^{2} (137.1/sq mi)
- Time zone: UTC+01:00 (CET)
  - Summer (DST): UTC+02:00 (CEST)
- Website: www.vg-dolmar-salzbruecke.de

Dolmar-Salzbrücke is a Verwaltungsgemeinschaft ("collective municipality") in the district Schmalkalden-Meiningen, in Thuringia, Germany. The seat of the Verwaltungsgemeinschaft is in Schwarza. It was formed on 1 January 2012 from the former Verwaltungsgemeinschaften Dolmar and Salzbrücke.

The Verwaltungsgemeinschaft Dolmar-Salzbrücke consists of the following municipalities:

1. Belrieth
2. Christes
3. Dillstädt
4. Einhausen
5. Ellingshausen
6. Kühndorf
7. Leutersdorf
8. Neubrunn
9. Obermaßfeld-Grimmenthal
10. Ritschenhausen
11. Rohr
12. Schwarza
13. Utendorf
14. Vachdorf
