= Wolfmannshausen =

German former municipality

Coordinates: 50°26′N 10°28′E

Wolfmannshausen (German pronunciation: [vɔlfmansˈhaʊzn̩]) is a former municipality in the district Schmalkalden-Meiningen, in Thuringia, Germany. From December 1, 2007 it is part of Grabfeld.
