= Schwickershausen =

Former municipality in Thuringia, Germany

Coordinates: 50°28′N 10°22′E

Schwickershausen (German pronunciation: [ʃvɪkɐsˈhaʊzn̩]) is a former municipality in the district Schmalkalden-Meiningen, in Thuringia, Germany. From December 1, 2007, it is part of Grabfeld.
