= Queienfeld =

- Ortsteil of Grabfeld
- Interactive map of Queienfeld
- Location within Germany Location within Thuringia
- Coordinates: 50°27′N 10°26′E
- Country: Germany
- State: Thuringia
- District: Schmalkalden-Meiningen
- Municipality: Grabfeld

Area
  - Total: 9.67 km^{2} (3.73 sq mi)
- Elevation: 370 m (1,210 ft)

Population (2006-12-31)
  - Total: 526
  - Density: 54.4/km^{2} (141/sq mi)
- Time zone: UTC+01:00 (CET)
  - Summer (DST): UTC+02:00 (CEST)
- Postal codes: 98631
- Dialling codes: 036944
- Vehicle registration: SM

Queienfeld (German pronunciation: [ˈkvaɪənfɛlt]) is a former municipality in the district Schmalkalden-Meiningen, in Thuringia, Germany. As of December 2007 it became part of Grabfeld.

== Notable people ==
- Wilhelmine Eichler
