= Carl Wagner (painter) =

German painter (1796–1867)

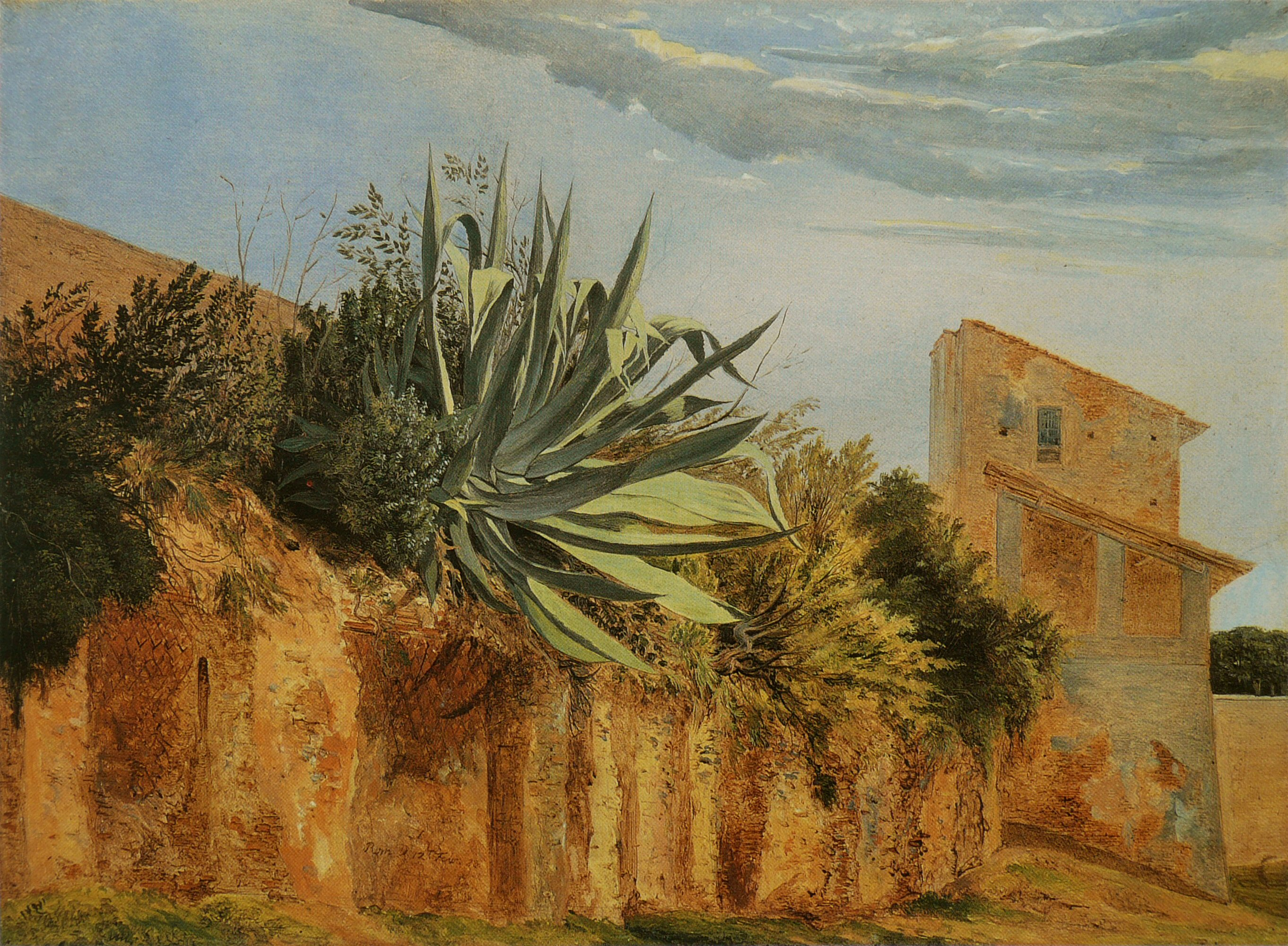
around the walls of Rome, Kunsthalle Bremen

Carl Wagner (19 October 1796 in Roßdorf (Thüringen) - 10 February 1867 in Meiningen) was a German painter and representatives of the Romantic landscape painting.

== Life and work ==
On 19 October 1796 was the painter and etcher, Carl Wagner, son of the poet Johann Ernst Wagner, born in Roßdorf. He lived here for the first eight years of his life. 1804 the family moved to Meiningen, the royal capital of Saxe-Meiningen.

From 1813 to 1816 he studied at the Academy of Forestry in Dreißigacker and attended the Royal Saxon Academy of Forestry in Tharandt. Wagner graduated from 1817 to 1820 to study painting at the Dresden Art Academy. From 1822 to 1825, he took advantage of a stay in Italy for artistic perfection. Again and again he will later travel to Vienna, and Switzerland, to capture alpine landscape impressions. 1825 he was appointed court painter and gallery-inspector at the ducal court in Meiningen.

Most of his works are in the art collection of Meininger Museums.

Wagner was one of the most important German painters of the Romantic landscape. He was known by Ludwig Richter (1803–1884) and Hermann Fechner. He was influenced, among others, by JA Koch (1768–1839) and Caspar David Friedrich.

About his family life, little is known, after heavy blows of fate and the death of his wife and two children, he lived a very lonely until his own death in 1867 in Meiningen.

== Illustrations (selection) ==
- In:album by German artists in Originalradirungen- Düsseldorf. Buddeus, 1841. The Digitized output of the University and State Library Düsseldorf
