= Bibra, Schmalkalden-Meiningen =

Bibra
- Ortsteil of Grabfeld
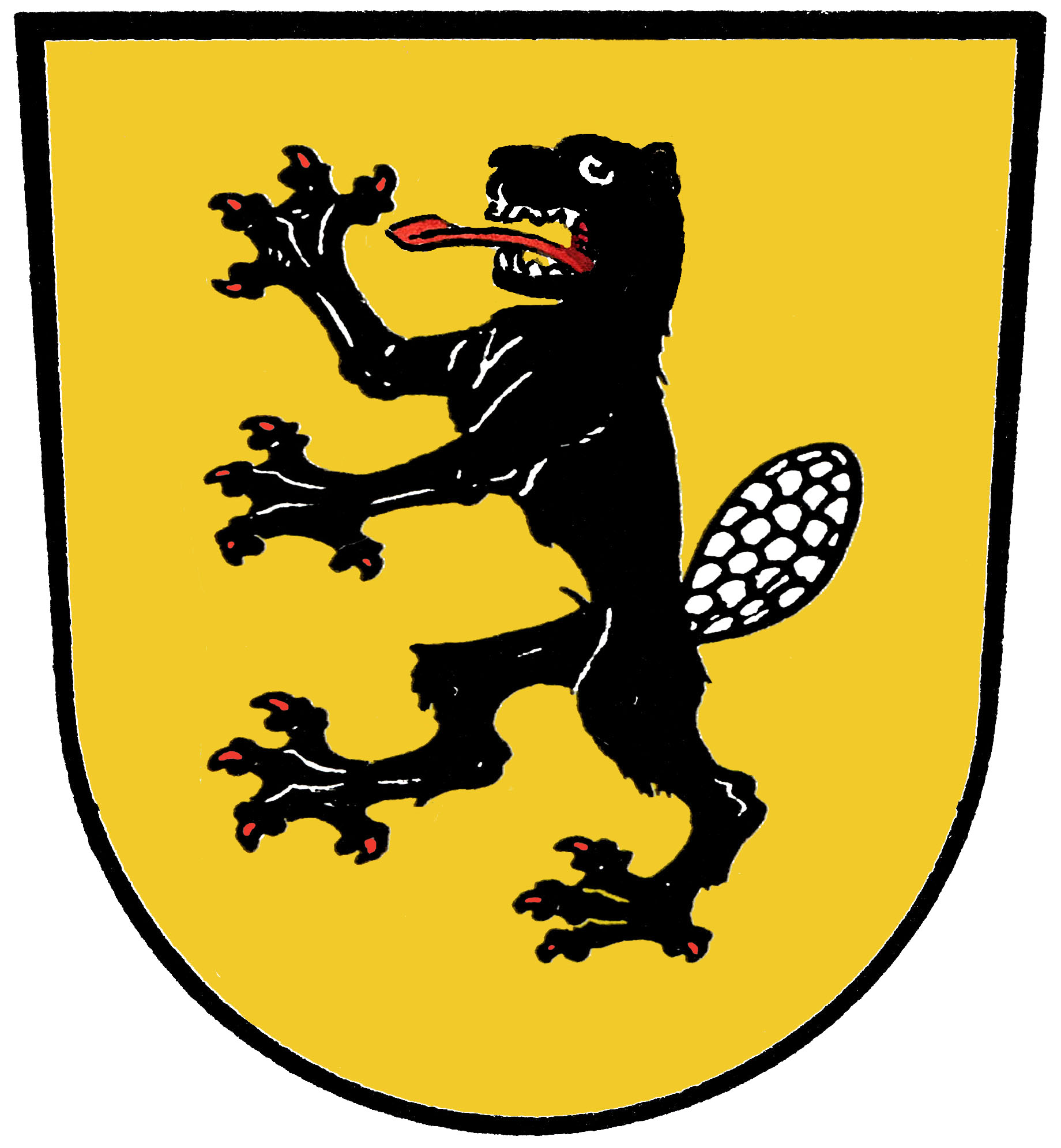
- Coat of arms
- Interactive map of Bibra
- Location within Germany Location within Thuringia
- Coordinates: 50°28′11″N 10°26′18″E
- Country: Germany
- State: Thuringia
- District: Schmalkalden-Meiningen
- Municipality: Grabfeld

Area
  - Total: 9.70 km^{2} (3.75 sq mi)
- Elevation: 365 m (1,198 ft)

Population (2006-12-31)
  - Total: 597
  - Density: 61.5/km^{2} (159/sq mi)
- Time zone: UTC+01:00 (CET)
  - Summer (DST): UTC+02:00 (CEST)
- Postal codes: 98631
- Dialling codes: 036944
- Vehicle registration: SM

Bibra (German pronunciation: [ˈbiːbʁa]) is a former municipality in the district Schmalkalden-Meiningen, in Thuringia, Germany. From December 1, 2007 it is part of Grabfeld.

== St. Leo's Church ==
The church dating from 1492 contains several works from Tilman Riemenschneider:Altar of the Apostles, Altar of the Church Fathers, and Altar of the Annunciation, Carving of St. Kilian, Crucifix, and epitaph of Hans von Bibra (the father of Lorenz von Bibra). All are wood except the epitaph. The current church had three benefactors: Kilian von Bibra, Lorenz von Bibra, and Albrecht von Bibra. All three were high church officials in Würzburg. Three benefactors hence three altar design and three coat-of-arms stained glass windows.

== Photo gallery ==
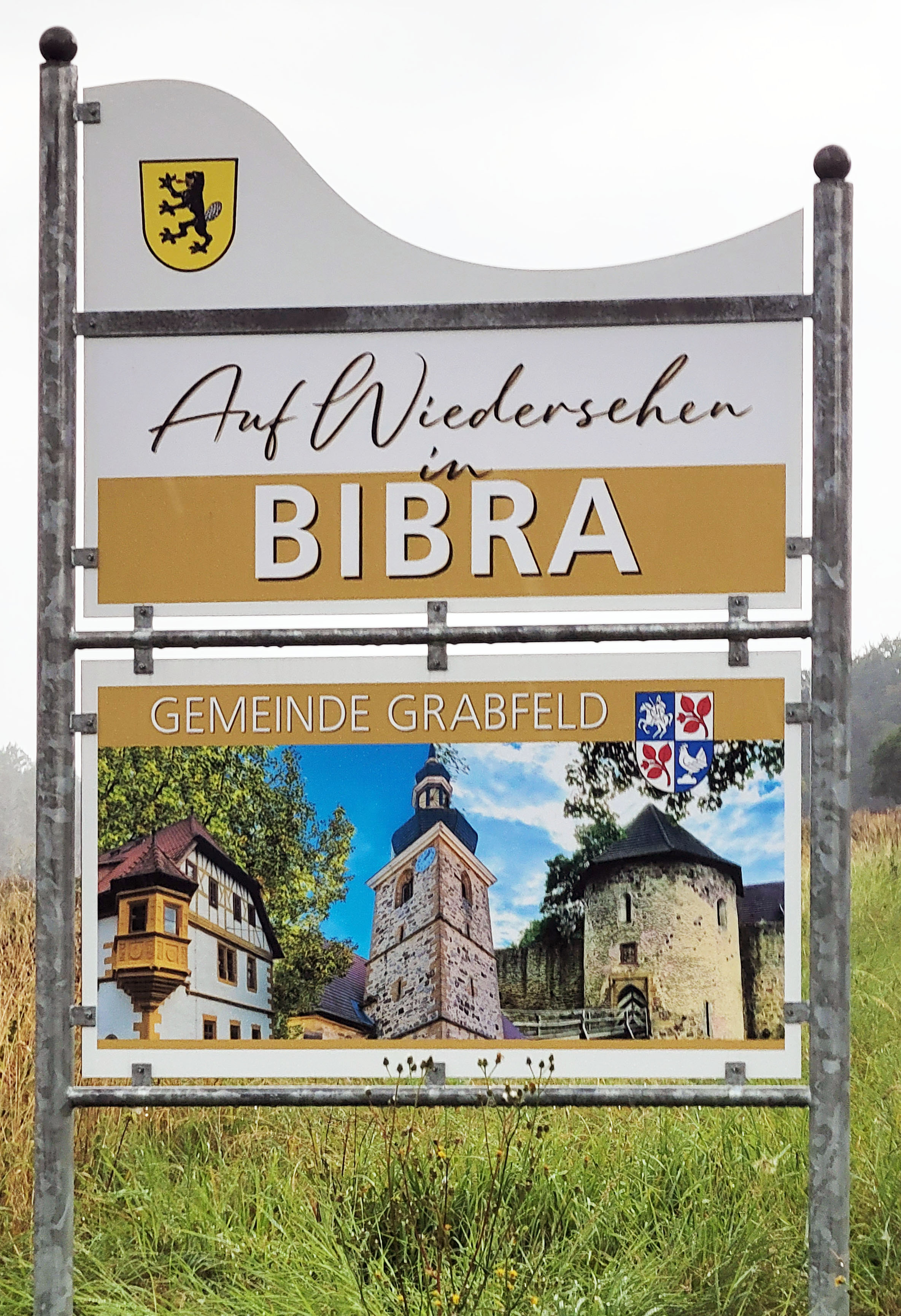
Goodbye sign 2024

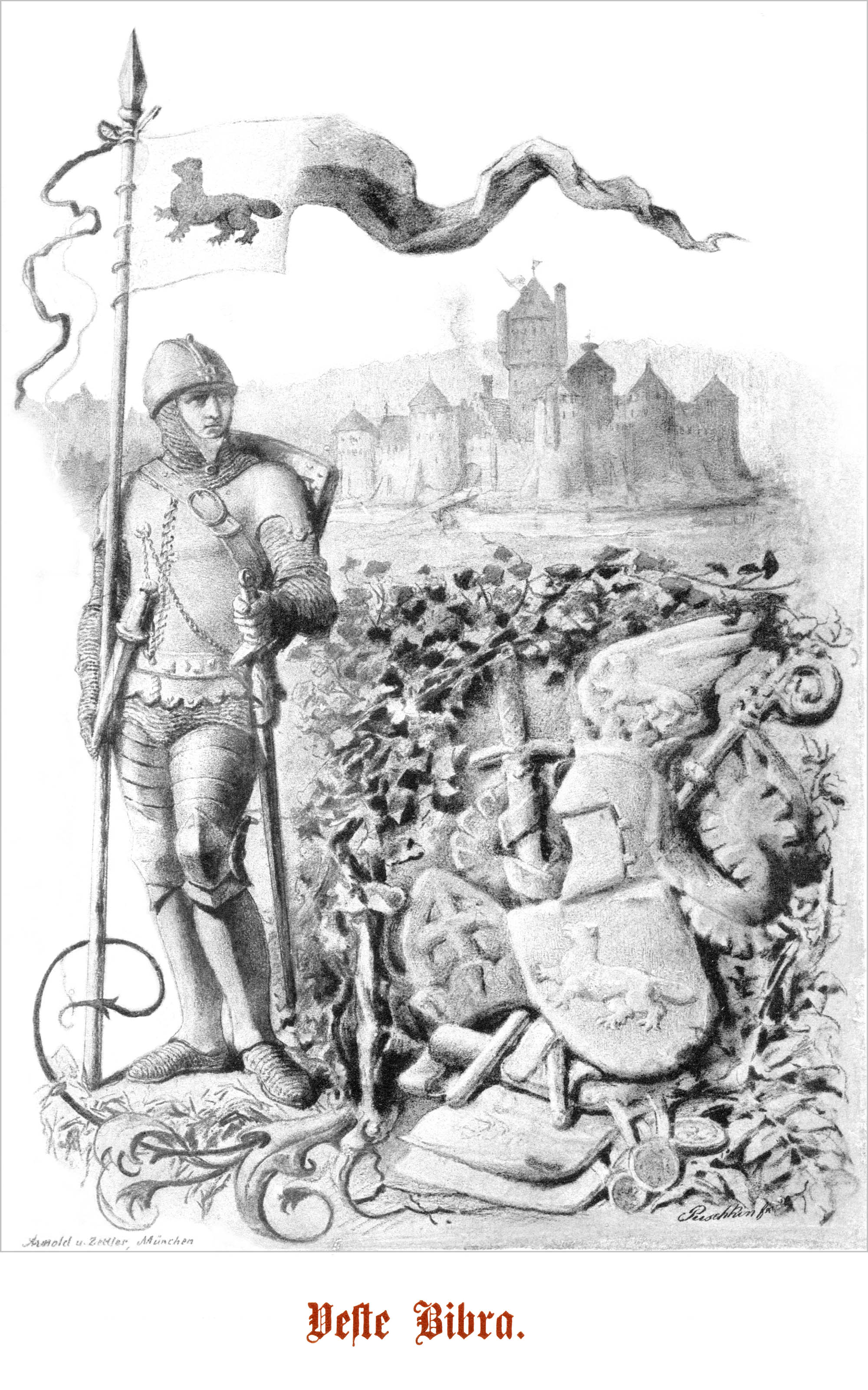
Representation of a Bibra knight in front of the castle Bibra

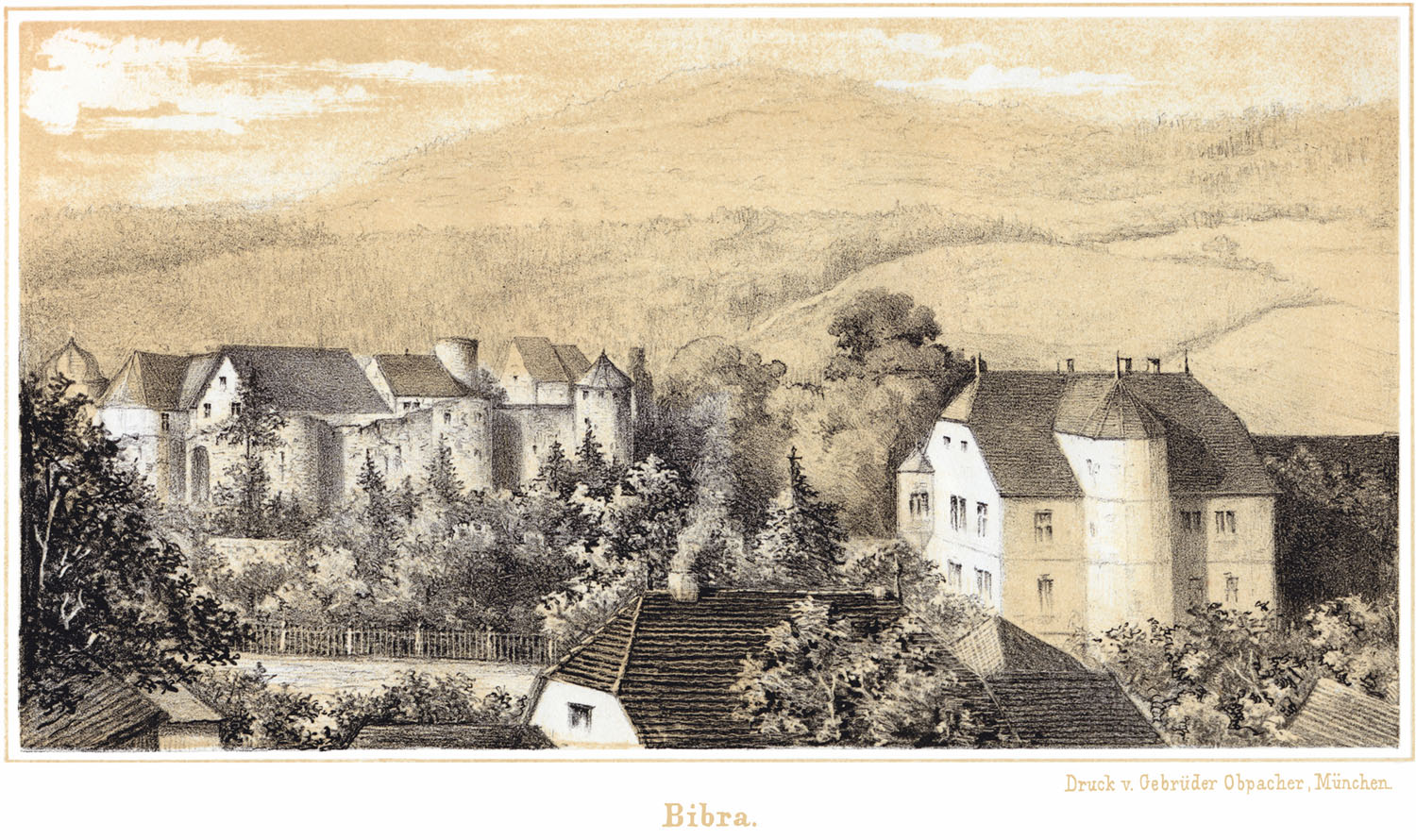
Engraving from 1870

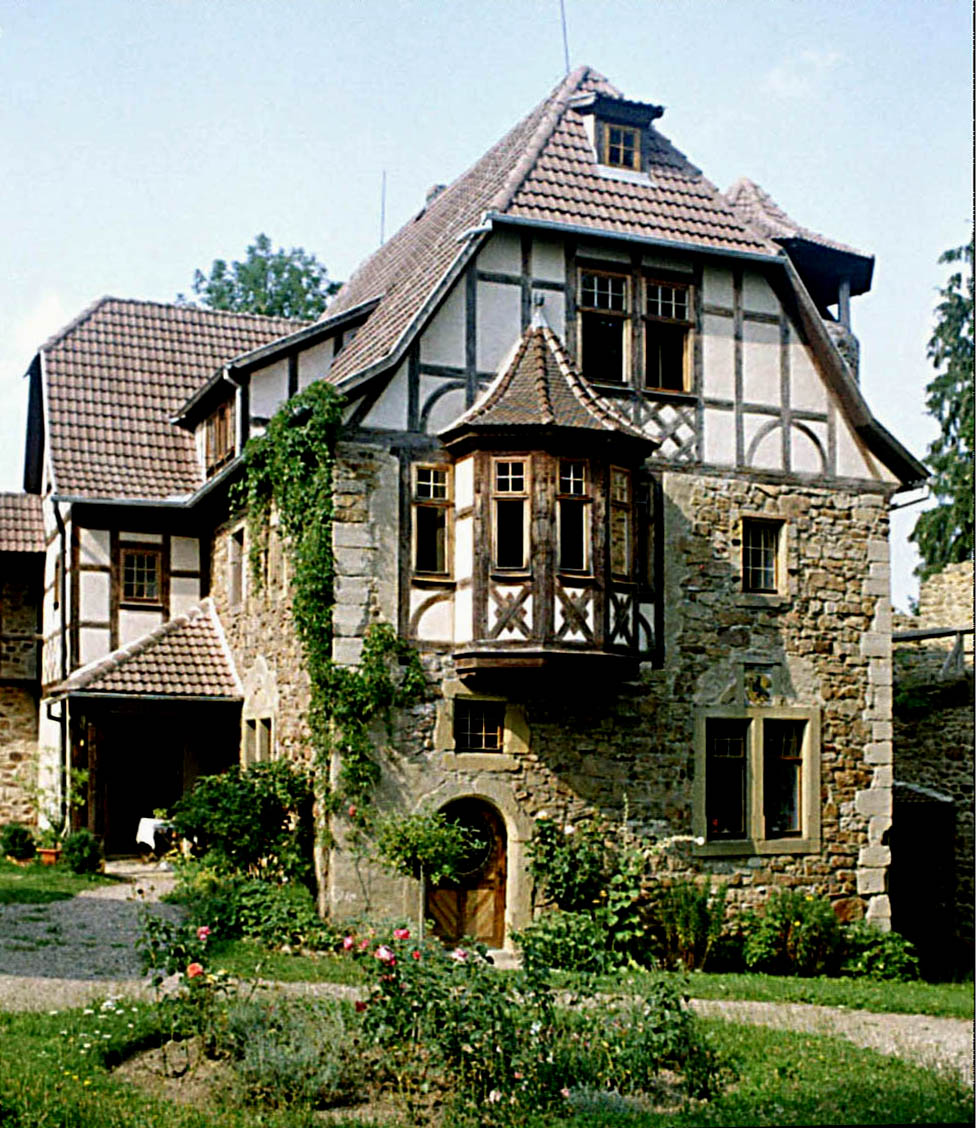
Burg Bibra

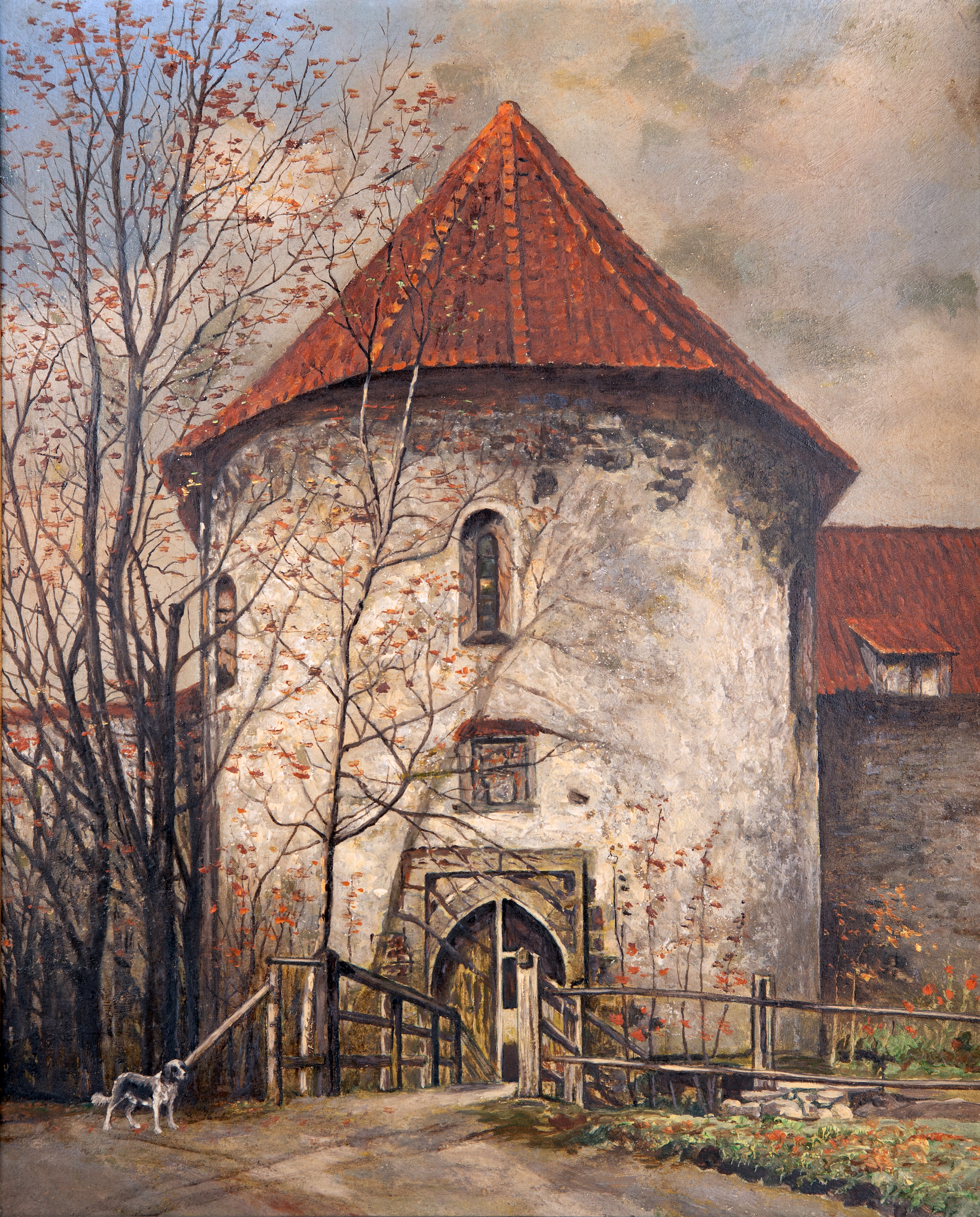

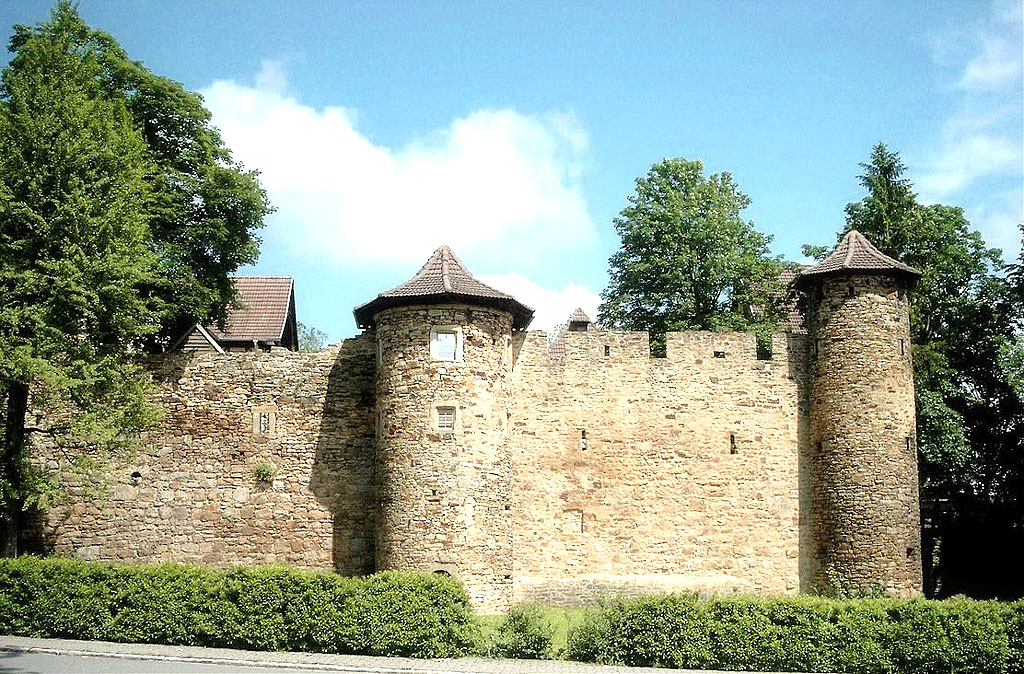
Burg Bibra

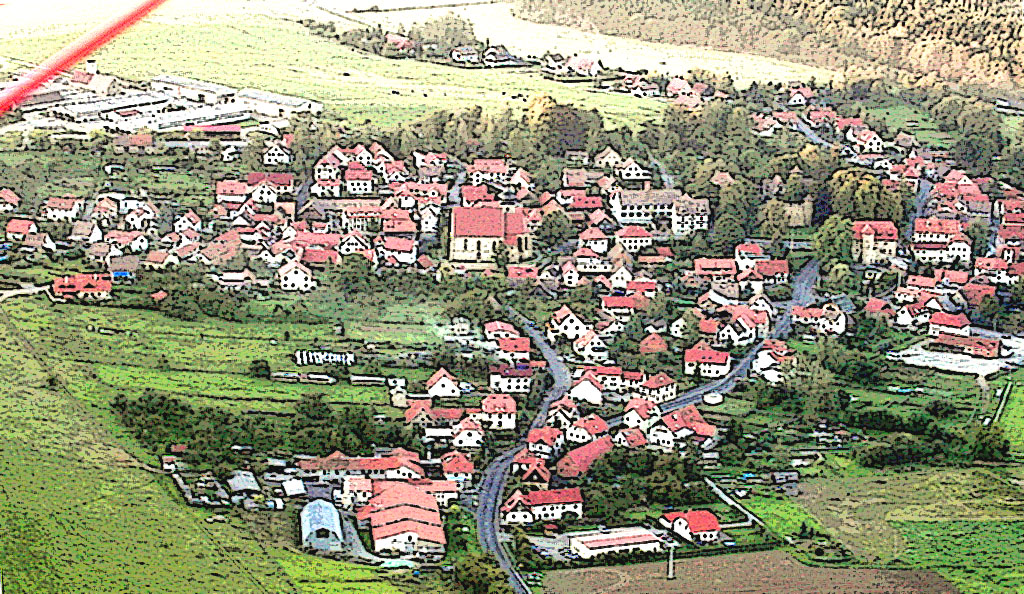
Bibra

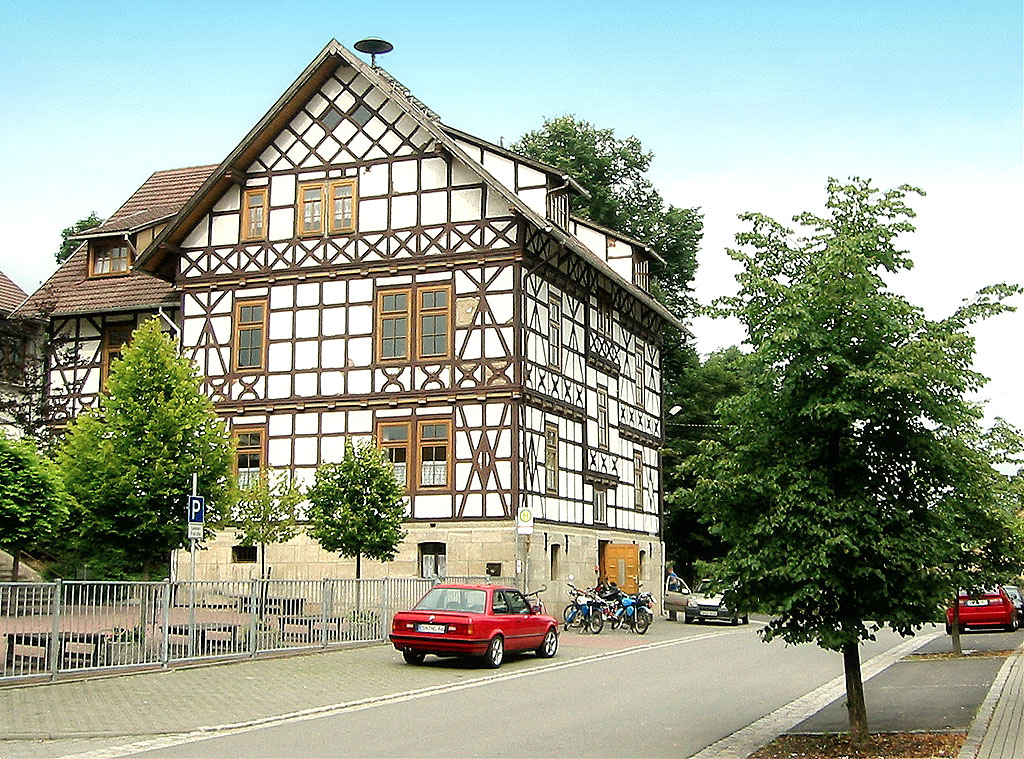
school at Bibra

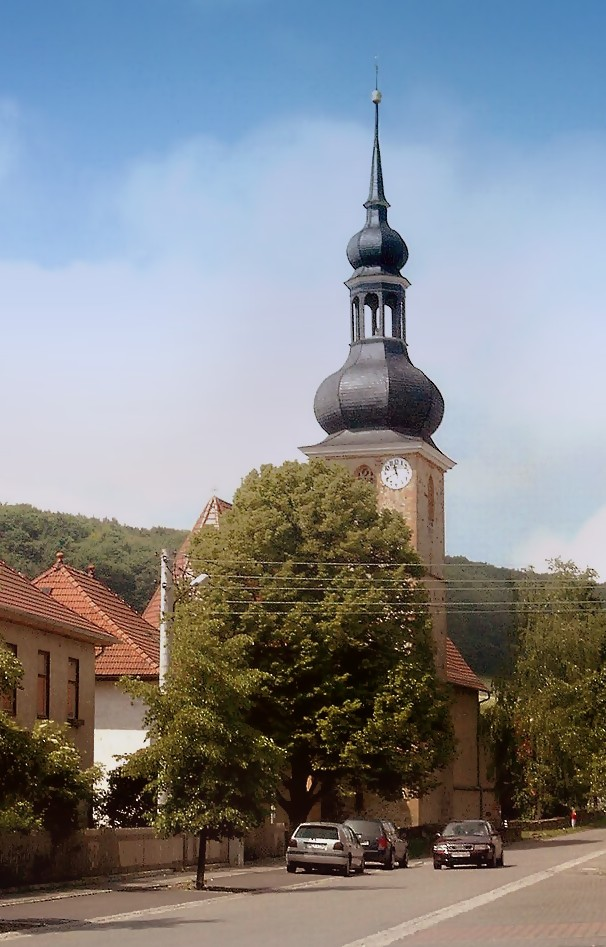
St. Leo's Church Bibra

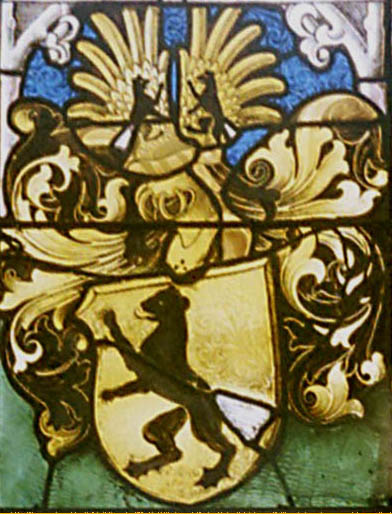
Albrecht von Bibra window St. Leo's church, Bibra, c.1492

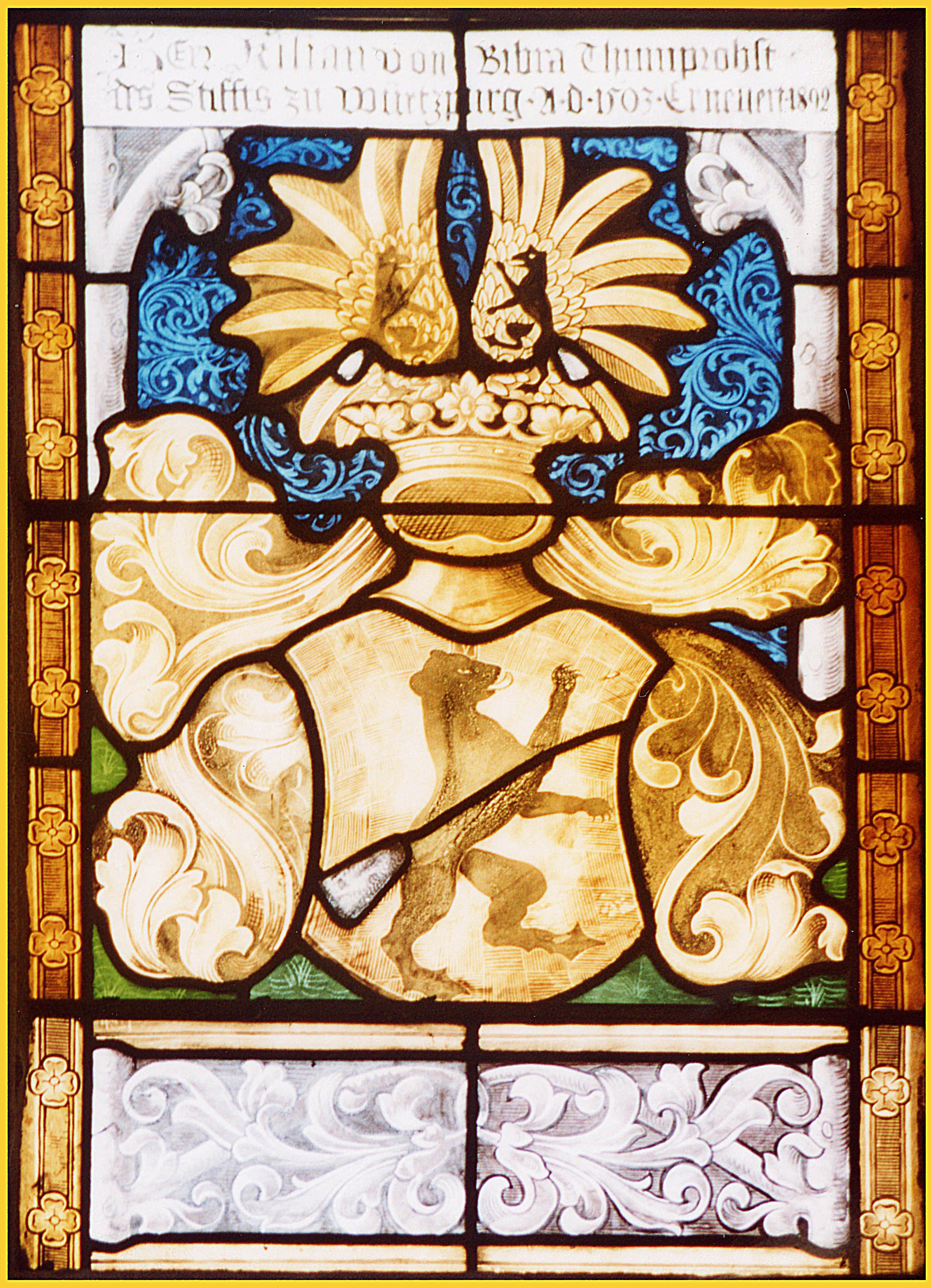
Kilian von Bibra window St. Leo's church, Bibra, c.1492

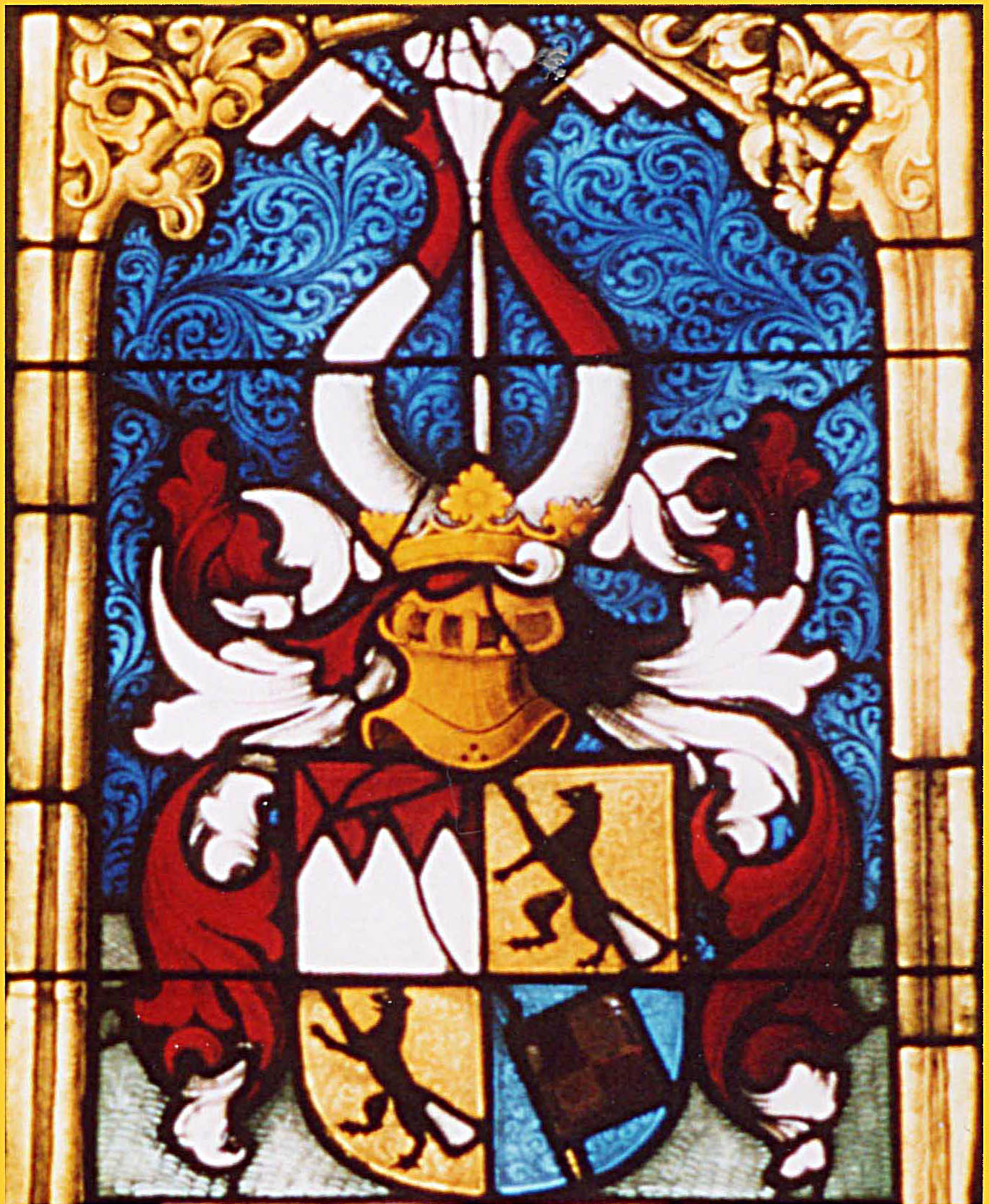
Lorenz von Bibra window St. Leo's church, Bibra, c.1492

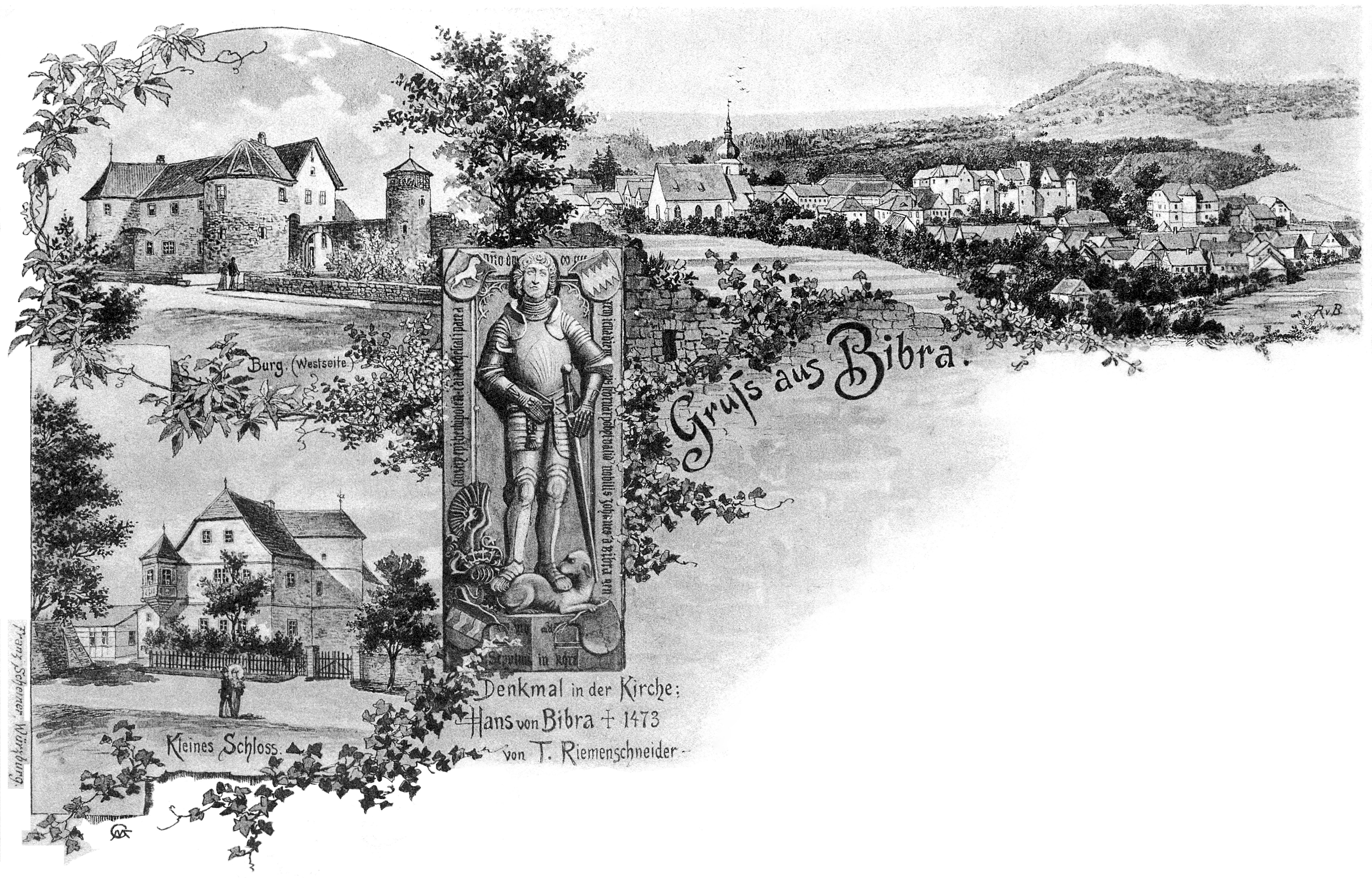
Postcard by Franz Scheiner
