= Einhausen =

Einhausen may refer to:

- Einhausen, Hesse
- Einhausen, Thuringia
