= Heßles =

- Village of Fambach
- Interactive map of Heßles
- Location within Germany Location within Thuringia
- Coordinates: 50°45′6″N 10°24′26″E
- Country: Germany
- State: Thuringia
- District: Schmalkalden-Meiningen
- Town: Fambach

Area
  - Total: 5.39 km^{2} (2.08 sq mi)
- Elevation: 320 m (1,050 ft)

Population (2006-12-31)
  - Total: 390
  - Density: 72/km^{2} (190/sq mi)
- Time zone: UTC+01:00 (CET)
  - Summer (DST): UTC+02:00 (CEST)
- Postal codes: 98597
- Dialling codes: 03683
- Vehicle registration: SM
- Website: www.hessles.de

Heßles is a former municipality in the district Schmalkalden-Meiningen, in Thuringia, Germany. Since 1 December 2008, it is part of Fambach.
