= Jüchsen =

- Ortsteil of Grabfeld
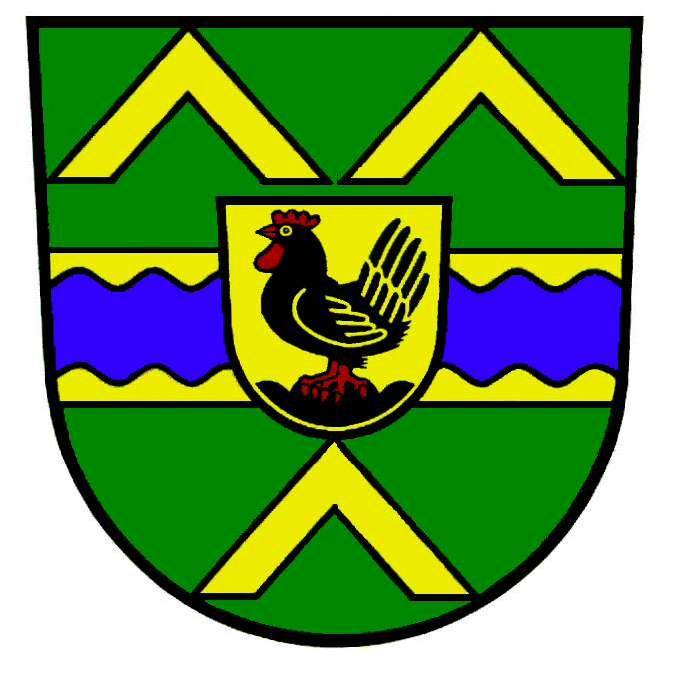
- Coat of arms
- Interactive map of Jüchsen
- Location within Germany Location within Thuringia
- Coordinates: 50°29′N 10°29′E
- Country: Germany
- State: Thuringia
- District: Schmalkalden-Meiningen
- Municipality: Grabfeld

Area
  - Total: 27.53 km^{2} (10.63 sq mi)
- Elevation: 340 m (1,120 ft)

Population (2006-12-31)
  - Total: 1,575
  - Density: 57.21/km^{2} (148.2/sq mi)
- Time zone: UTC+01:00 (CET)
  - Summer (DST): UTC+02:00 (CEST)
- Postal codes: 98631
- Dialling codes: 036947
- Vehicle registration: SM
- Website: www.juechsen-info.de

Jüchsen (German pronunciation: [ˈjʏksn̩]) is a former municipality in the district Schmalkalden-Meiningen, in Thuringia, Germany. On 1 December 2007, Jüchsen was merged with other municipalities into the present-day municipality of Grabfeld.
