= Exdorf =

Former municipality in Schmalkalden-Meiningen, Thuringia, Germany

Coordinates: 50°28′N 10°33′E

Exdorf is a former municipality in the district Schmalkalden-Meiningen, in Thuringia, Germany. From 1 December 2007, it is part of Grabfeld. As of 31 December 2006, it had 536 inhabitants.
