= Nordheim, Thuringia =

Nordheim
- Ortsteil of Grabfeld
- Interactive map of Nordheim
- Location within Germany Location within Thuringia
- Coordinates: 50°27′10″N 10°24′06″E
- Country: Germany
- State: Thuringia
- District: Schmalkalden-Meiningen
- Municipality: Grabfeld

Area
  - Total: 7.91 km^{2} (3.05 sq mi)
- Elevation: 340 m (1,120 ft)

Population (2006-12-31)
  - Total: 256
  - Density: 32.4/km^{2} (83.8/sq mi)
- Time zone: UTC+01:00 (CET)
  - Summer (DST): UTC+02:00 (CEST)
- Postal codes: 98631
- Dialling codes: 036944
- Vehicle registration: SM
- Website: www.vg-grabfeld.de

Nordheim (German pronunciation: [ˈnɔʁthaɪm]) was a municipality in the district Schmalkalden-Meiningen, in Thuringia, Germany. On December 1, 2007, it became part of Grabfeld.
