= Wölfershausen =

- Ortsteil of Grabfeld
- Interactive map of Wölfershausen
- Location within Germany Location within Thuringia
- Coordinates: 50°29′28″N 10°26′4″E
- Country: Germany
- State: Thuringia
- District: Schmalkalden-Meiningen
- Municipality: Grabfeld

Area
  - Total: 4.35 km^{2} (1.68 sq mi)
- Elevation: 334 m (1,096 ft)

Population (2017-12-31)
  - Total: 357
  - Density: 82.1/km^{2} (213/sq mi)
- Time zone: UTC+01:00 (CET)
  - Summer (DST): UTC+02:00 (CEST)
- Postal codes: 98617
- Dialling codes: 036947
- Vehicle registration: SM

Wölfershausen (German pronunciation: [vœlfɐsˈhaʊzn̩]) is a village and a former municipality in the district Schmalkalden-Meiningen, in Thuringia, Germany. Since 1 January 2019, it is part of the municipality Grabfeld.
