= Fambach =

- Municipality
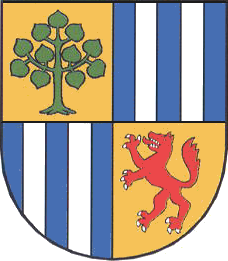
- Coat of arms

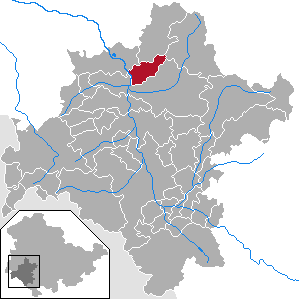
- Location of Fambach within Schmalkalden-Meiningen district
- Interactive map of Fambach
- Location within Germany Location within Thuringia
- Coordinates: 50°44′18″N 10°22′10″E
- Country: Germany
- State: Thuringia
- District: Schmalkalden-Meiningen

Government
  - Mayor (2018–24): Ralf-Peter Schmidt (CDU)

Area
  - Total: 18.05 km^{2} (6.97 sq mi)
- Elevation: 270 m (890 ft)

Population (2025-12-31)
  - Total: 1,868
  - Density: 103.5/km^{2} (268.0/sq mi)
- Time zone: UTC+01:00 (CET)
  - Summer (DST): UTC+02:00 (CEST)
- Postal codes: 98597
- Dialling codes: 036848
- Vehicle registration: SM
- Website: www.gemeinde-fambach.de

Fambach is a municipality in the district Schmalkalden-Meiningen, in Thuringia, Germany. Since 1 December 2008 it has incorporated the former municipality of Heßles.

== History ==
From 1868 to 1944, Fambach was part of the Prussian Province of Hesse-Nassau.
