= Hermann Paul Reißhaus =

German politician

Paul Reißhaus
- Born: Hermann Paul Reißhaus; 29 September 1855; Burg bei Magdeburg, Province of Saxony, Kingdom of Prussia, German Confederation
- Died: 15 September 1921 (aged 65); Schwarzburg, Thuringia, Germany
- Occupation: politician
- Political party: SPD
- Spouse: Anna Schumann (1859–1945)
- Children: Oswald Reißhaus (1877–1934); Elfriede Reißhaus (1893–1944)

Paul Reißhaus (29 September 1855 – 5 September 1921) was a pioneering German politician. He was the first SPD member of the national parliament (Reichstag) from Erfurt.

== Life ==
=== Family provenance and a career before and beyond politics ===
Hermann Paul Reißhaus was born in Burg, a small manufacturing town a short distance to the north-east of Magdeburg in central northern Germany. The town had been extensively settled by Huguenots after 1685 and sources describe the Reißhaus family as "dissident" (in religious terms, non-conformist). His father was a master-tailor: he himself undertook an apprenticeship in tailoring between 1869 and 1872. From 1878 he was working as a self-employed tailor. From 1892 he was the proprietor of a ladies' and gentlemen's fashion outfitters in Erfurt.

=== Politics ===
In 1874 Reißhaus joined the Social Democratic Party ("Sozialdemokratische Partei Deutschlands" / SPD). By 1878 he had relocated to Berlin. That was the year of Bismarck's Anti-Socialist Laws, however, and in 1880, as a political activist, he was deprived of his Berlin residence permit. He moved to Erfurt in December. Like many Social Democrats excluded from Berlin he was able to shape the new political party in his new home region. He became the dominating figure in the Erfurt district SPD, a position he retained till his death in 1921.

In the context of the Anti-Socialist Laws, the 1884 Health Insurance Law ("Krankenkassengesetz") offered one route for progressive political work that could be undertaken legally. The Erfurt Social Democrats received a visit from Wilhelm Liebknecht in February 1882 and in July of that year there was a visit from Max Kayser. The purpose was to offer support and encouragement. In the 1884 General Election, for the first time, in Erfurt the SPD topped the poll with 2,662 votes in the city (through nationally they were still being outperformed by several centre and right of centre parties). Still in 1884, Reißhaus found himself banned from distributing printed material.

He produced and wrote for the Thuringia party newspaper Tribüne following its launch. The first issue of the Thüringer Tribüne, the organ for everyman from the people appeared on 1 September 1889. In it Reißhaus proclaimed that it represented a Social-Democratic agenda, embracing all the interests of the people, striving to improve the condition of the working class and promoting the introduction of a universal, equal and direct voting entitlement in respect of all parliamentary bodies.

=== International and national politics ===
During the week of 14–21 July 1889 Reißhaus was in Paris where he took part in what became the founding congress of the Second Socialist International. In October 1891, sitting alongside August Bebel und Wilhelm Liebknecht, he opened the SPD (party) congress in his home city. The congress agreed the "Erfurt Program" which now became the reference point for party strategy and objectives through several decades. During this period he was also a co-founder of the "German Tailoring Association" (Deutsche Schneider- und Schneiderinnenverband), serving between 1888 and 1892 as the union's "Vertrauensmann" (chief spokesman) and administrative head.

In the 1890 General Election the SPD won more votes than any other party, although just 35 of the 397 seats in the national parliament (Reichstag). One of those seats was nevertheless won by Paul Reißhaus, who was thereby the first Social Democrat from Erfurt to secure election to the parliament. His election leaflets proclaimed, "Down with the Cartel! - the oppressors of the people, the food-price manipulators". From June 1893 to January 1907, and then again from January 1912 until the imperial political structure ended in November 1918, Reißhaus sat as an SPD member of the imperial Reichstag, representing what was identified as the Saxe-Meiningen 2 electoral district.

During the politically confrontational decade that opened the twentieth century he continued to use the Thüringer Tribüne, the organ for everyman from the people (party newspaper) to campaign on important themes. In the issue of 2 July 1911 he called for a struggle to put a complete end to the contentious Prussian three-class voting system, which had the effect of weighting the vote in Prussian state elections so that the votes of higher tax payers counted for more than the votes of those who paid less in tax.

=== War ===
As late as 30 July 1914 the Erfurt Social Democrats were calling, at a meeting with banners, for "War against the war". Two days later, as the Imperial Russian Army mobilised in support of Serbia, on 1 August 1914 the German Empire declared war in the Russian Empire. On 4 August 1914 a meeting tool place in Berlin of the (since 1912) 110 SPD Reichstag members to decide on the parliamentary party's position over the war. Paul Reißhaus was one of those who believed that, war having been declared, the party should support parliamentary votes to provide "war credits" to finance the fighting. Slightly more than three months later, on 12 November 1914, a meeting of party members in Erfurt, acting under the influence of Reißhaus, backed the party's so-called "Burgfriedenspolitik", which amounted to a comprehensive parliamentary truce for the duration of the war. The decision was resisted by left-wing party members from the outset and would lead, in 1917, to a split of the SPD itself. Despite his initial public support for the leadership line, Reißhaus, like many on the political left, continued to be badly conflicted over political support for the war. On 21 December 1915, with slaughter on the frontline and acute deprivation on the home front mounting, he signed a declaration opposing the fifth vote for war credits and absented himself from the chamber before the actual vote was held.

On 25 March 1916 Reißhaus spoke out against the exclusion from the party of 18 SPD Reichstag members who had voted against war credits. The group of eighteen, known as the "Haase-Ledebour Group", went on to form the "Social Democratic Working Group" in the Reichstag, which adumbrated the wider party split of 1917. Riehaus himself nevertheless stayed with the "mainstream" SPD. In January 1917 he gave a speech in Erfurt setting out his vision for the party and criticising the leadership: "The underlying cause of these splits is the overall political strategy which representatives of the party majority have been following since 4 August 1914 .... The former majority wanted to direct the party towards socialist reform. That is the clear and simple objective of the majority of representatives .... Getting rid of the capitalist social order was the defining goal of the old Social Democratic Party. Now they just want a seat at the table of government."

=== Postwar developments ===
Revolution broke out in Erfurt on 8 November 1918. This was part of a wider revolutionary wave that had started in the northern ports earlier in the month. In Erfurt Reißhaus and Theodor Cassau quickly emerged as leaders of the city's Workers' and Soldiers' Councils. They called for the creation of a "German Socialist Republic", with freedom to assemble and hold street demonstrations, the lifting of censorship and the liberation of all political prisoners. In several German cities the revolutionary movements of those time clearly took inspiration from the Russian Revolution which had broken out a year earlier and was still unfolding. In Erfurt the demands of the Workers' and Soldiers' Councils were seen by many in the local political establishment as relatively moderate. On 9 November 1919 Hermann Schmidt, the city's venerable mayor, co-opted Reißhaus and a fellow SPD politician called Richard Friedrich to become members of the city administration (Magistrat) as representatives of the Workers' and Soldiers' Councils. The central part that Reißhaus had played in the formulation of the Erfurt Program nearly thirty years earlier meant that his socialist credentials were still in good order: he carried considerable authority, and there are indications that it was as a result of his involvement and leadership that the city was spared much of the internecine violence that accompanied the year of revolutions in other German industrial cities.

In the aftermath of war Paul Reißhaus also made a return to national politics. In January 1919 was elected to the Weimar National Assembly, representing the SPD and Electoral District 36 (Thuringia). The National Assembly was the body mandated to produce a constitution for a new post-imperial - some dared to use the adjective "republican" - Germany. Election to the assembly took place through a far more democratic election than any that had gone before. Even women were permitted to vote, and for both sexes the minimum voting age was reduced to 20. As part of his own election campaign Reißhaus distributed a leaflet with a characteristically defiant message: "...accordingly, the National Assembly will have a composition that will hold back all capitalist and reactionary pressures. The old capitalist tyranny is defeated for good". In the event, things did not quite turn out that way.

The Weimar National Assembly turned out to be the precursor to a new kind of national parliament (Reichstag) for a new kind of post-imperial Germany. In June 1920 Paul Reißhaus again secured election as SPD member representing Thuringia. However, he died on 21 September 1921. He was absent from the first Reichstag sitting of 24 June 1920, and there is no mention in the minutes of his having spoken in the new Reichstag. His party colleague Wilhelmine Eichler took over his parliamentary seat.

== Personal ==
Paul Reißhaus was married to Anna Schumann (1859–1945). They had two recorded children: Oswald Reißhaus (1877–1934) and Elfriede Reißhaus (1893–1944).

== Honours ==
There are streets names after Paul Reißhaus in Erfurt and Weimar.
