= Grabfeld, Thuringia =

Grabfeld
- Municipality
- Coat of arms

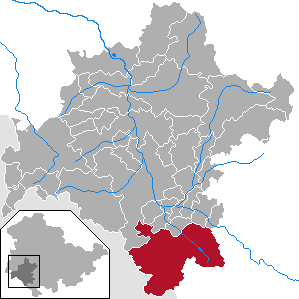
- Location of Grabfeld within Schmalkalden-Meiningen district
- Interactive map of Grabfeld
- Location within Germany Location within Thuringia
- Coordinates: 50°27′N 10°26′E
- Country: Germany
- State: Thuringia
- District: Schmalkalden-Meiningen
- Subdivisions: 13

Area
  - Total: 121.08 km^{2} (46.75 sq mi)
- Elevation: 360 m (1,180 ft)

Population (2025-12-31)
  - Total: 5,425
  - Density: 44.81/km^{2} (116.0/sq mi)
- Time zone: UTC+01:00 (CET)
  - Summer (DST): UTC+02:00 (CEST)
- Postal codes: 98631
- Dialling codes: 036944, 036947
- Vehicle registration: SM
- Website: www.grabfeld.de

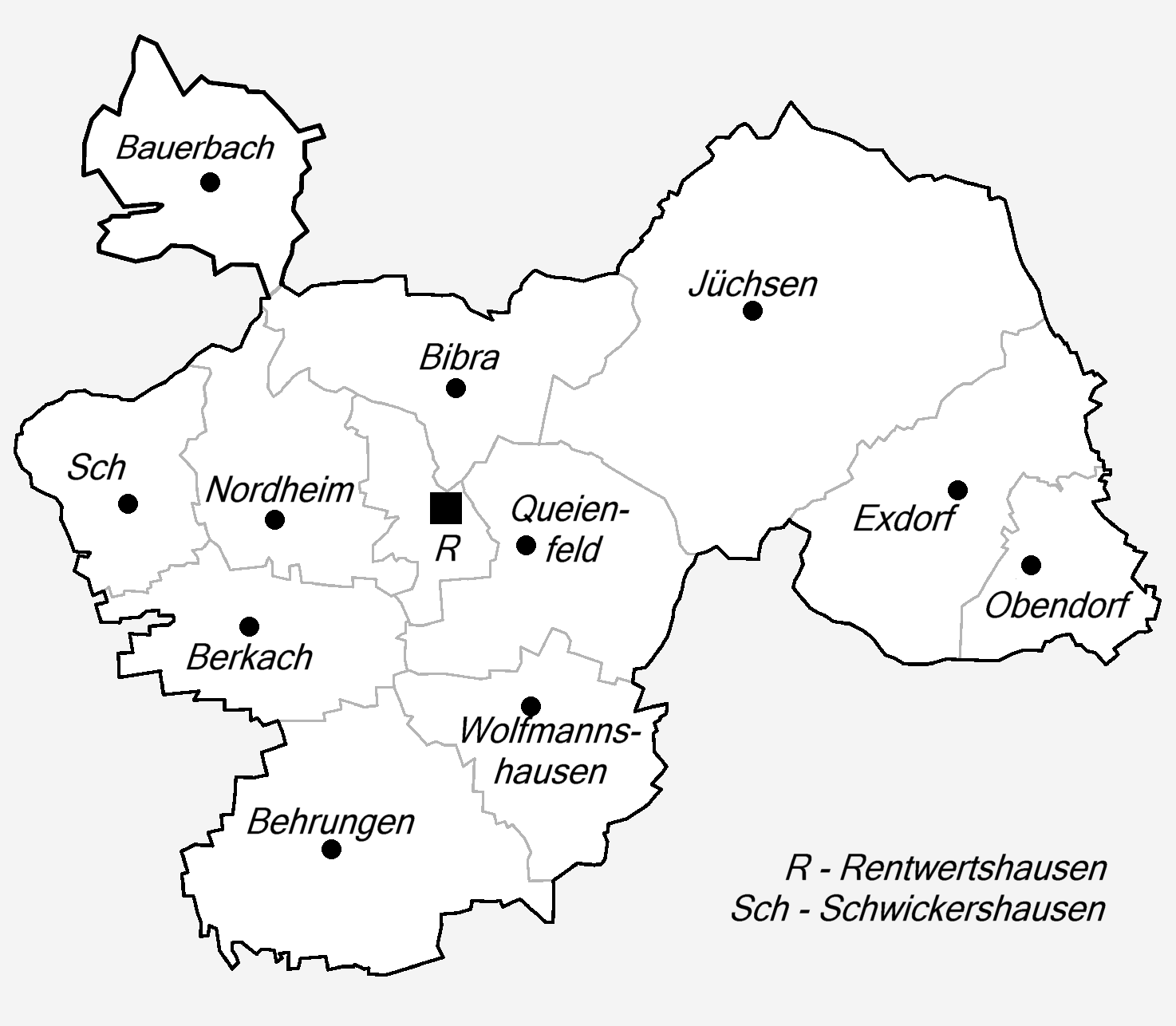
Villages within Grabfeld

Grabfeld (German pronunciation: [ˈɡʁaːpˌfɛlt]) is a municipality in the district Schmalkalden-Meiningen, in Thuringia, Germany.

Grabfeld was established as a municipality on 1 December 2007 by combining the former municipalities of Behrungen, Berkach, Bibra, Exdorf, Jüchsen, Nordheim, Queienfeld, Rentwertshausen, Schwickershausen and Wolfmannshausen, replacing the former Verwaltungsgemeinschaft of the same name. It was joined by the former municipality Bauerbach in January 2012, and by Wölfershausen in January 2019.

== History ==
Within the German Empire (1871–1918), the territory of the present-day municipality of Grabfeld was part of the Duchy of Saxe-Meiningen.
