= Wilhelmine Eichler =

German politician (1872–1937)

Wilhelmine Eichler (5 April 1872 – 27 November 1937) was a German politician (SPD, KPD). At the adoption by Germany of a democratic constitution in 1920, Eichler was one of the 37 female members of what became the national parliament (Reichstag). She became a member of the still overwhelmingly male Reichstag itself in September 1921.

== Life ==
Wilhelmine Eichler was born in Queienfeld, a small village in the countryside to the southwest of Erfurt, in Saxe-Meiningen, then in central southern Germany. Her father was a linen weaver. Until her marriage in 1893 she worked in domestic service. Later also worked as an assistant at a brewery and with a book producer. As a young woman she began to engage with the Social Democratic Party (Sozialdemokratische Partei Deutschlands / SPD), which at this stage was still considered by members of the establishment to be outside the political mainstream. In 1906 she joined the party executive of her local party branch. She also joined the local branch of the book workers' trades union ("Buchbinderverband"). In 1913 she attended a training at the Trades Union Academy in Berlin, in order to develop her political and organisational skills, and participated in various regional assemblies and congresses and national party conferences.

Between 1914 and 1918, during the First World War, Eichler undertook war welfare work. In 1917 she took part in the Berlin Women's Congress.

In January 1919 she was elected as a member of the Weimar National Assembly, the body convened to create a new constitution in the context of military defeat and the ensuing year of revolution. The assembly election for the first time in a German national election gave women the right to vote. With 37.9% of the popular vote, the largest party was Social Democratic Party, and Eichler's name was high enough up on the party list for her to be allocated one of the party's 163 seats. She represented Registration District 36 (Thuringia). The 1919 election was the first election in German history in which women were permitted to seek election, which meant that Eichler was one of the country's first female parliamentarians. In parallel with her national mandate, between 1919 and 1920 she also sat as a member of the short-lived Regional parliament for Saxe-Altenburg.

Following the June 1920 general election she was no longer a member for what now became Weimar Germany's first national parliamentary term. Although the Social Democrats remained the largest party, they had shed approximately a third of their seats, losing out to the more radical Independent Social Democratic Party (Unabhängige Sozialdemokratische Partei Deutschlands / USPD). Eichler's absence from the parliament was not permanent. In September 1920 Paul Reißhaus, an SPD Reichstag member representing what was now Electoral District 13 (Thuringia) died, and his seat was reallocated by the party to Wilhelmine Eichler. She now continued to sit in the Reichstag till the next general election, in May 1924.

1921 was a year of continued political realignment on the German left, and the breakaway USPD now itself split apart. Some of its members joined the SPD, while the larger faction became the core membership for the newly formed German Communist Party. A few years later, in February 1924, Eichler broke with the SPD, crossing over the Communist faction in the Reichstag. Her final four months in the chamber were therefore spent as a Communist member.

After May 1924 Wilhelmine appears to have been no longer politically active, and her footprints are for most purposes absent from the historical record. It is known that she died on 27 November 1937 in Leipzig.
