= Rosa, Germany =

Rosa
- Municipality
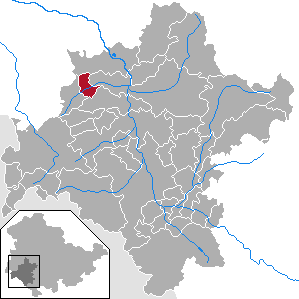
- Location of Rosa within Schmalkalden-Meiningen district
- Interactive map of Rosa
- Location within Germany Location within Thuringia
- Coordinates: 50°43′N 10°15′E
- Country: Germany
- State: Thuringia
- District: Schmalkalden-Meiningen

Government
  - Mayor (2022–28): Silvio Hartmann

Area
  - Total: 9.42 km^{2} (3.64 sq mi)
- Elevation: 350 m (1,150 ft)

Population (2025-12-31)
  - Total: 673
  - Density: 71.4/km^{2} (185/sq mi)
- Time zone: UTC+01:00 (CET)
  - Summer (DST): UTC+02:00 (CEST)
- Postal codes: 98590
- Dialling codes: 036968
- Vehicle registration: SM
- Website: www.rosa-georgenzell.de

Rosa is a municipality in the district Schmalkalden-Meiningen, in Thuringia, Germany. It is situated in the Rosatal valley at the foot of Stopfelskuppe, a preserved natural site with an extinct volcano of 620 meters.
