= Rhönblick =

- Municipality
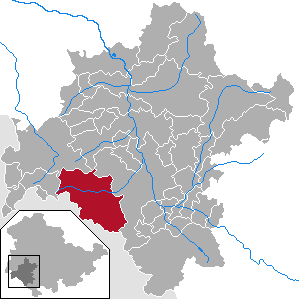
- Location of Rhönblick within Schmalkalden-Meiningen district
- Interactive map of Rhönblick
- Location within Germany Location within Thuringia
- Coordinates: 50°33′27″N 10°17′6″E
- Country: Germany
- State: Thuringia
- District: Schmalkalden-Meiningen
- Subdivisions: 10

Area
  - Total: 76.16 km^{2} (29.41 sq mi)
- Elevation: 400 m (1,300 ft)

Population (2025-12-31)
  - Total: 2,588
  - Density: 33.98/km^{2} (88.01/sq mi)
- Time zone: UTC+01:00 (CET)
  - Summer (DST): UTC+02:00 (CEST)
- Postal codes: 98617
- Dialling codes: 036943
- Vehicle registration: SM
- Website: www.gemeinde-rhoenblick.de

Rhönblick is a municipality in the district Schmalkalden-Meiningen, in Thuringia, Germany.
