= Alois Pfeiffer =

German trade unionist

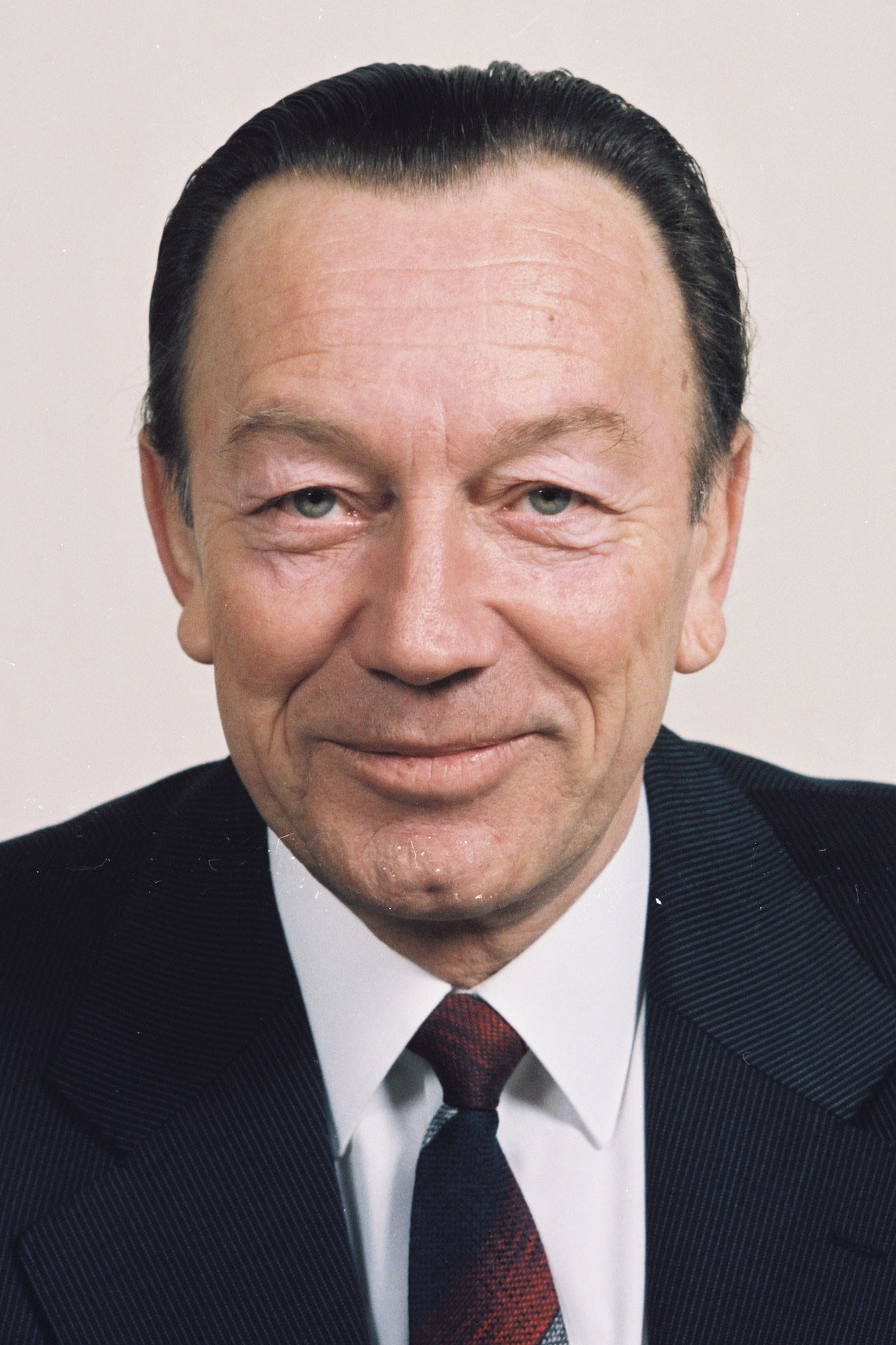
- Pfeiffer in 1985

European Commissioner for Economic Affairs and Employment
- In office 1985 – 1 August 1987
- President: Jacques Delors
- Succeeded by: Peter Schmidhuber

Personal details
- Born: 25 September 1924 Bauerbach, Thuringia, Germany
- Died: 1 August 1987 (aged 62) Düsseldorf, West Germany
- Party: Social Democratic Party of Germany

Alois Pfeiffer (25 September 1924 – 1 August 1987) was a German trade unionist who served as a European Commissioner in the 1980s.

Pfeiffer was born on 25 September 1924 in Bauerbach in Thuringia. He worked as a forester, and then became a director of the Horticulture, Agriculture and Forestry Union, serving as the union's president from 1969 to 1975. He also served for a decade on the main board of the German Trade Union Confederation (DGB).

A member of the Social Democratic Party of Germany (SPD), in 1985, he was appointed as one of West Germany's two European Commissioners on the first Delors Commission, as Commissioner for Economic affairs and employment.

He died in office on 1 August 1987, in Düsseldorf, and on 22 September was replaced as Commissioner by Peter Schmidhuber.

Political offices
Preceded by Karl-Heinz Narjes	German European Commissioner; 1985–1987	Succeeded by Peter Schmidhuber
