= Bauerbach =

- Ortsteil of Grabfeld
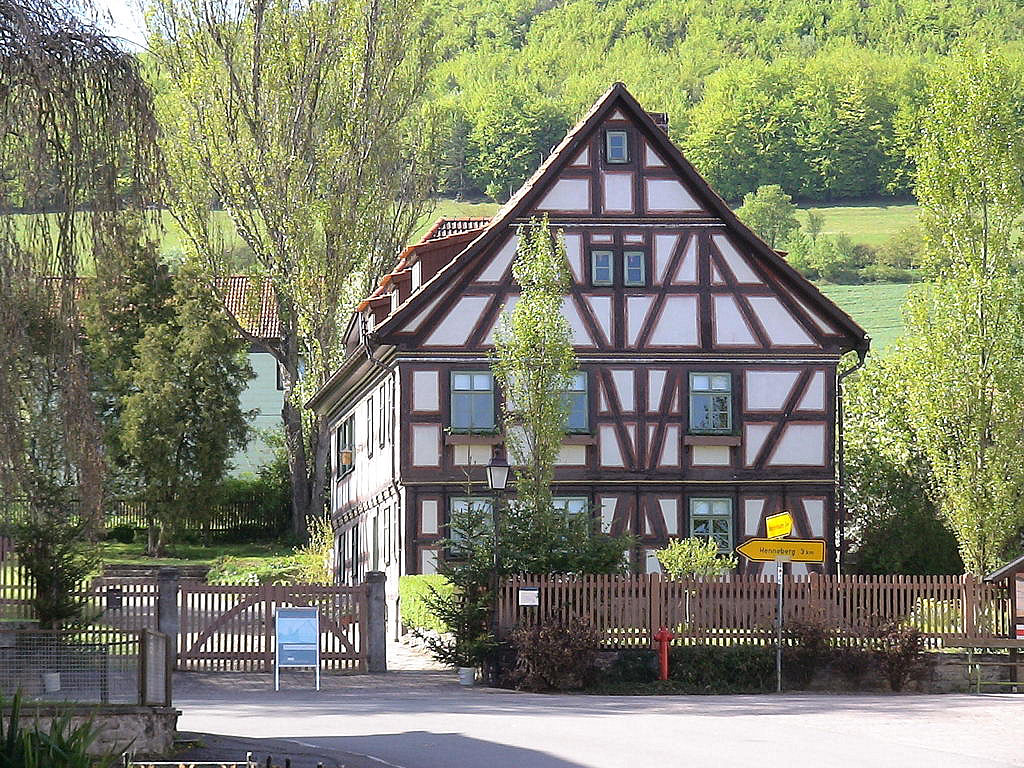
- Bauerbach

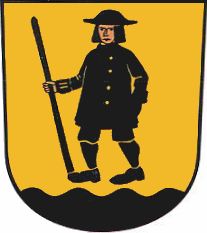
- Coat of arms
- Interactive map of Bauerbach
- Location within Germany Location within Thuringia
- Coordinates: 50°29′54″N 10°23′30″E
- Country: Germany
- State: Thuringia
- District: Schmalkalden-Meiningen
- Municipality: Grabfeld

Area
  - Total: 6.04 km^{2} (2.33 sq mi)
- Elevation: 379 m (1,243 ft)

Population (2010-12-31)
  - Total: 252
  - Density: 41.7/km^{2} (108/sq mi)
- Time zone: UTC+01:00 (CET)
  - Summer (DST): UTC+02:00 (CEST)
- Postal codes: 98617
- Dialling codes: 036945
- Vehicle registration: SM

Bauerbach (German pronunciation: [ˈbaʊɐbax]) is a village and a former municipality in the district of Schmalkalden-Meiningen, in Thuringia, Germany. Since 1 January 2012, it is part of the municipality Grabfeld.

== Notable people ==
- Alois Pfeiffer
