= Peter Schmidhuber =

German politician (1931–2020)

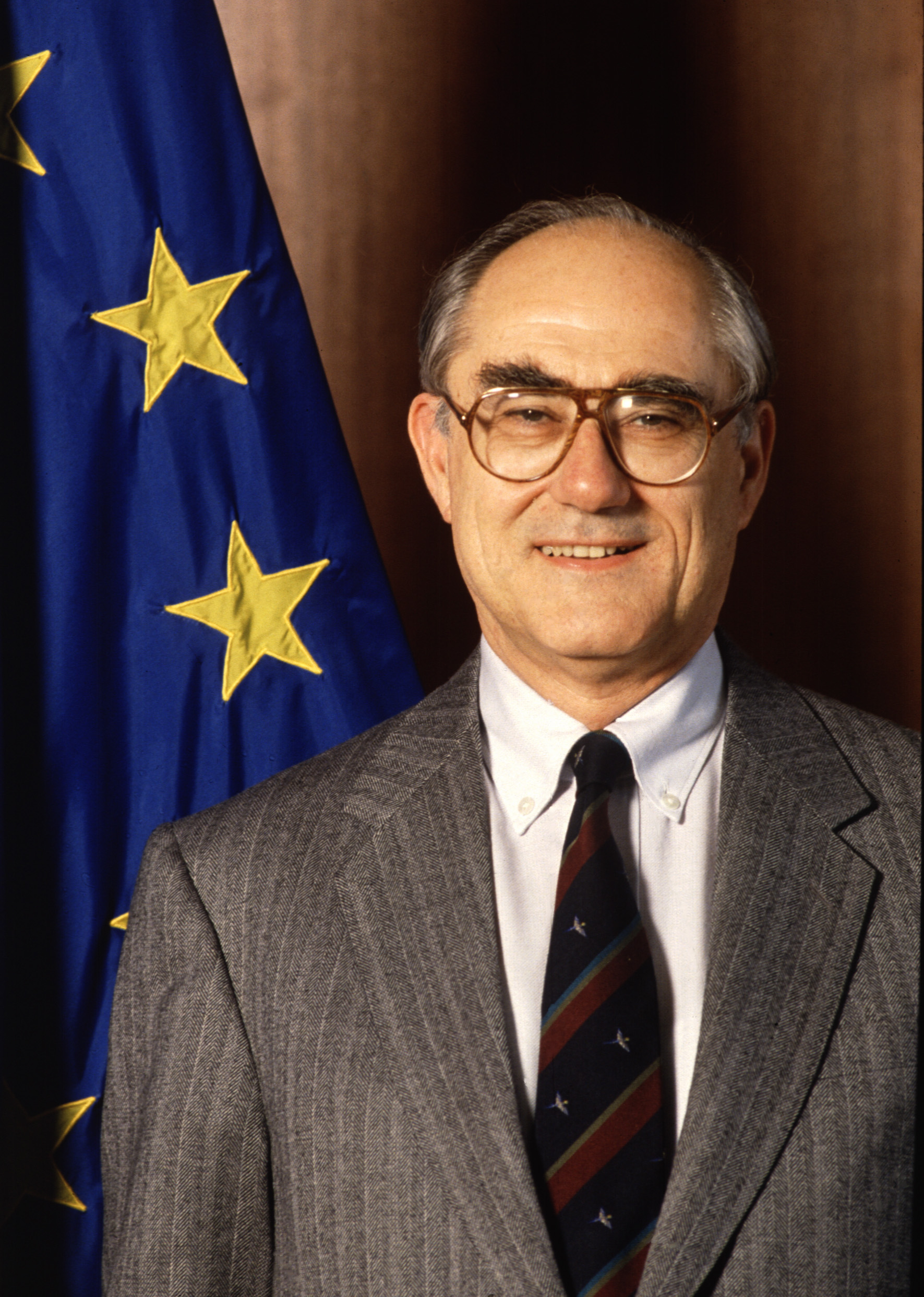
- Official portrait, 1989

European Commissioner for Administrative Affairs, Audit and Anti-Fraud
- In office 1989–1995
- President: Jacques Delors
- Preceded by: Henning Christophersen
- Succeeded by: Erkki Liikanen

Minister for Federal Affairs of Bavaria
- In office 7 November 1978 – 27 September 1987
- Minister-President: Franz Josef Strauss
- Preceded by: Franz Heubl
- Succeeded by: Georg Freiherr von Waldenfels

Member of the Landtag of Bavaria
- In office 30 October 1978 – 10 November 1987
- Preceded by: Multi-member district
- Succeeded by: Eleonore Grabmair
- Constituency: Upper Bavaria (1978–1982); Munich-Pasing (1982–1987)

Member of the Bundestag; from Bavaria
- In office 13 December 1972 – 6 December 1978
- Preceded by: Multi-member district
- Succeeded by: Ekkehard Voigt
- Constituency: State list (1972–1976); Munich West (1976–1978)
- In office 19 October 1965 – 20 October 1969
- Constituency: State list

Personal details
- Born: 15 December 1931 Munich, Germany
- Died: 26 December 2020 (aged 89)
- Party: Christian Social Union
- Other political affiliations: European People's Party
- Children: 1
- Education: LMU Munich

Peter Schmidhuber (15 December 1931 – 26 December 2020) was a German and European politician from the Bavarian CSU party.

== Biography ==
Schmidhuber was born in Munich, Bavaria. He studied law and economics at the Ludwig-Maximilians-Universität München from 1951, gaining his license to practice as a lawyer in 1960. Schmidhuber worked from 1961 to 1966 in the Bavarian State Finance Department, then as a legal adviser from 1961 to 1978.

He joined the Christian Social Union in 1952. He was from 1960 to 1966 a member of the Munich City Council, and from 1965 to 1969 and again from 1972 to 1978 a member of the German Bundestag (the lower chamber of the national parliament). On 15 October 1978 he was elected to the Bavarian state parliament, and he remained there until 1987. From 1978 to 1987 he was in the private office of Franz-Josef Strauss while the latter was regional Minister for Federal and European questions. He was also a member, at different times, of the coordination committee between the two chambers of the federal German parliament, and of the NATO Parliamentary Assembly.

Between 1987 and 1995 Schmidhuber was a member of the three Delors Commissions in Brussels, where he replaced Alois Pfeiffer, also from Bavaria. Schmidhuber's portfolios in the European Commission included Economic Affairs and Employment (from 22 September 1987 to the end of 1989); the budget (1989 to 1992); and budget, financial control and the Cohesion Fund (from 1993 to 1994). After his retirement from the commission in 1995 Schmidhuber became a member of the Court of Directors of the Bundesbank (the German national bank). He worked subsequently for companies specializing in economic and company law.

== Decorations ==
Schmidhuber was awarded the Bundesverdienstkreuz (the Federal Cross of Merit) in 1982, and promoted in the order in 1986 (Great Cross of Merit with Star) and 1990 (Great Cross of Merit with Star and Shoulder band). He has also received various other regional and trade-related honours.

== Personal life ==
Schmidhuber had one daughter (Susanne). His wife predeceased him. His interests were history and philosophy, chess and art.

== Publications ==
A list of Schmidhuber's publications (in German) can be found on this weblink to the German national library http://dispatch.opac.d-nb.de/DB=4.1/REL?PPN=122929446

Political offices
Preceded by Alois Pfeiffer	German European Commissioner; 1987–1995	Succeeded by ?
