= Rohr, Thuringia =

Rohr
- Municipality
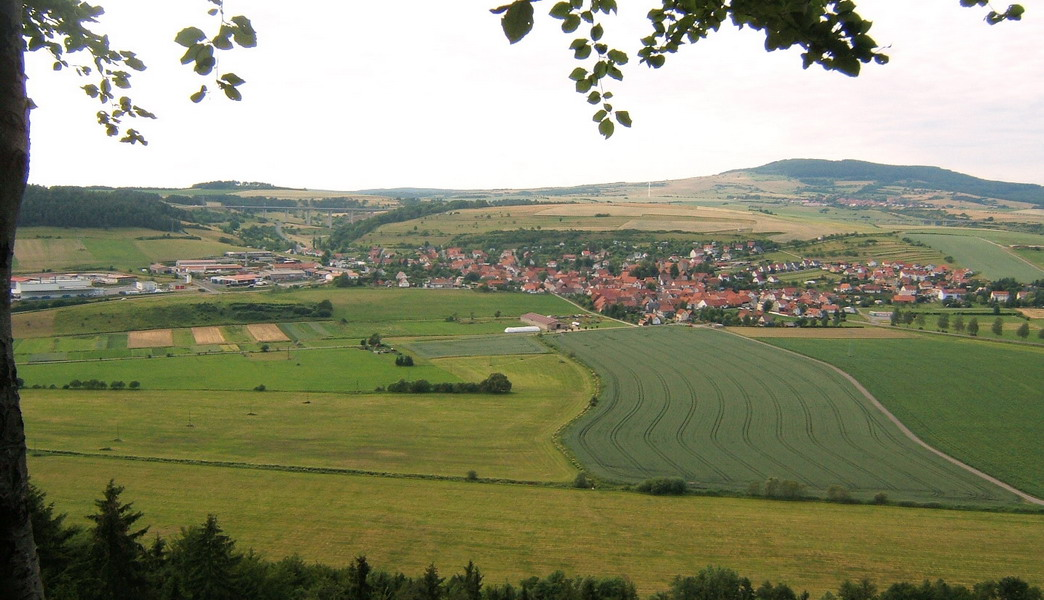

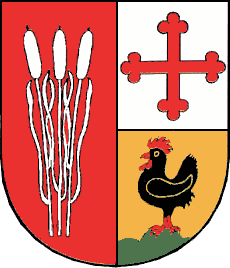
- Coat of arms

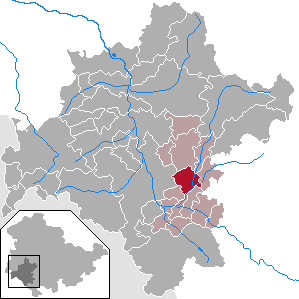
- Location of Rohr within Schmalkalden-Meiningen district
- Interactive map of Rohr
- Location within Germany Location within Thuringia
- Coordinates: 50°35′N 10°30′E
- Country: Germany
- State: Thuringia
- District: Schmalkalden-Meiningen
- Municipal assoc.: Dolmar-Salzbrücke

Government
  - Mayor (2022–28): Siegmar Kleffel (CDU)

Area
  - Total: 13.96 km^{2} (5.39 sq mi)
- Elevation: 340 m (1,120 ft)

Population (2025-12-31)
  - Total: 912
  - Density: 65.3/km^{2} (169/sq mi)
- Time zone: UTC+01:00 (CET)
  - Summer (DST): UTC+02:00 (CEST)
- Postal codes: 98530
- Dialling codes: 036844
- Vehicle registration: SM
- Website: www.vg-dolmar.de

Rohr (German pronunciation: [ʁoːɐ̯]) is a municipality in the Schmalkalden-Meiningen district in Thuringia.

== History ==
Rohr was first mentioned in 815. A Benedictine monastery was established in the 9th century and a Carolingian church, St. Michaels, was built. The monastery lasted for about 100 years but the church survives today. In 1206 a Benedictine convent was established outside of town. The convent was closely associated with the House of Henneberg and to a lesser degree with the Bibra family especially in the 14th century. Kloster Rohr was abandoned after reformation and is now a technical school. The shell of the former church was renovated into a modern building in the 2000s.

== Population history ==
Year	Population	Year	Population	Year	Population
1994	986	1998	1,085	2002	1,062
1995	1,032	1999	1,084	2003	1,062
1996	1,050	2000	1,089	2004	1046
1997	1,080	2001	1,077		

== Notable people ==
- Paul König
