= Norde =

Norde may refer to:

- Norde (Gilsa), a river of Hesse, Germany, tributary of the Gilsa
- Nordê, a village in the Tibet Autonomous Region of China
- Nordé, a village in northern-central Burkina Faso
- Sony Norde (b. 1989), Haitian footballer
