= Roßdorf, Thuringia =

Roßdorf
- Municipality
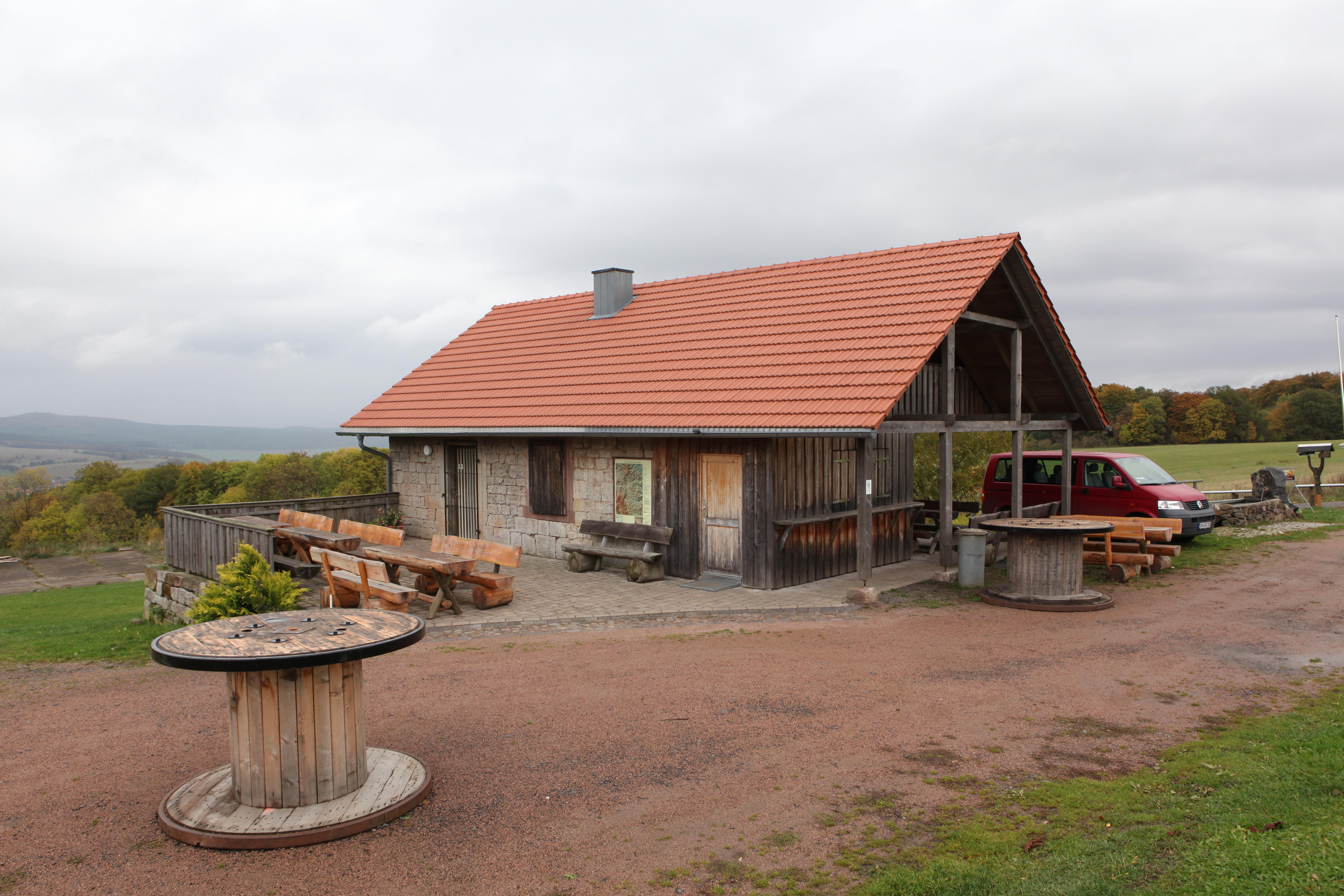

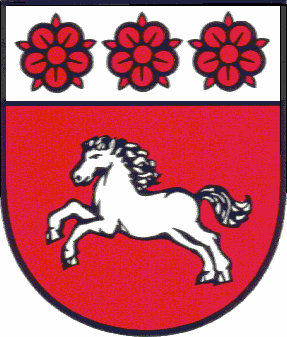
- Coat of arms

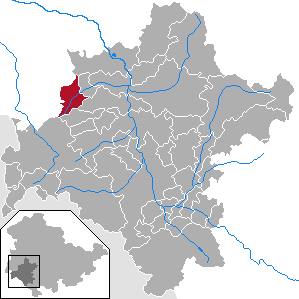
- Location of Roßdorf within Schmalkalden-Meiningen district
- Interactive map of Roßdorf
- Location within Germany Location within Thuringia
- Coordinates: 50°42′N 10°13′E
- Country: Germany
- State: Thuringia
- District: Schmalkalden-Meiningen

Government
  - Mayor (2022–28): Lisa Marie Pfaff (CDU)

Area
  - Total: 17.27 km^{2} (6.67 sq mi)
- Elevation: 380 m (1,250 ft)

Population (2025-12-31)
  - Total: 564
  - Density: 32.7/km^{2} (84.6/sq mi)
- Time zone: UTC+01:00 (CET)
  - Summer (DST): UTC+02:00 (CEST)
- Postal codes: 98590
- Dialling codes: 036968
- Vehicle registration: SM
- Website: www.rossdorf-rhoen.de

Roßdorf (German pronunciation: [ˈʁɔsdɔʁf]) is a municipality in the district Schmalkalden-Meiningen, in Thuringia, Germany.
