= Schwarza, Thuringia =

Schwarza
- Municipality
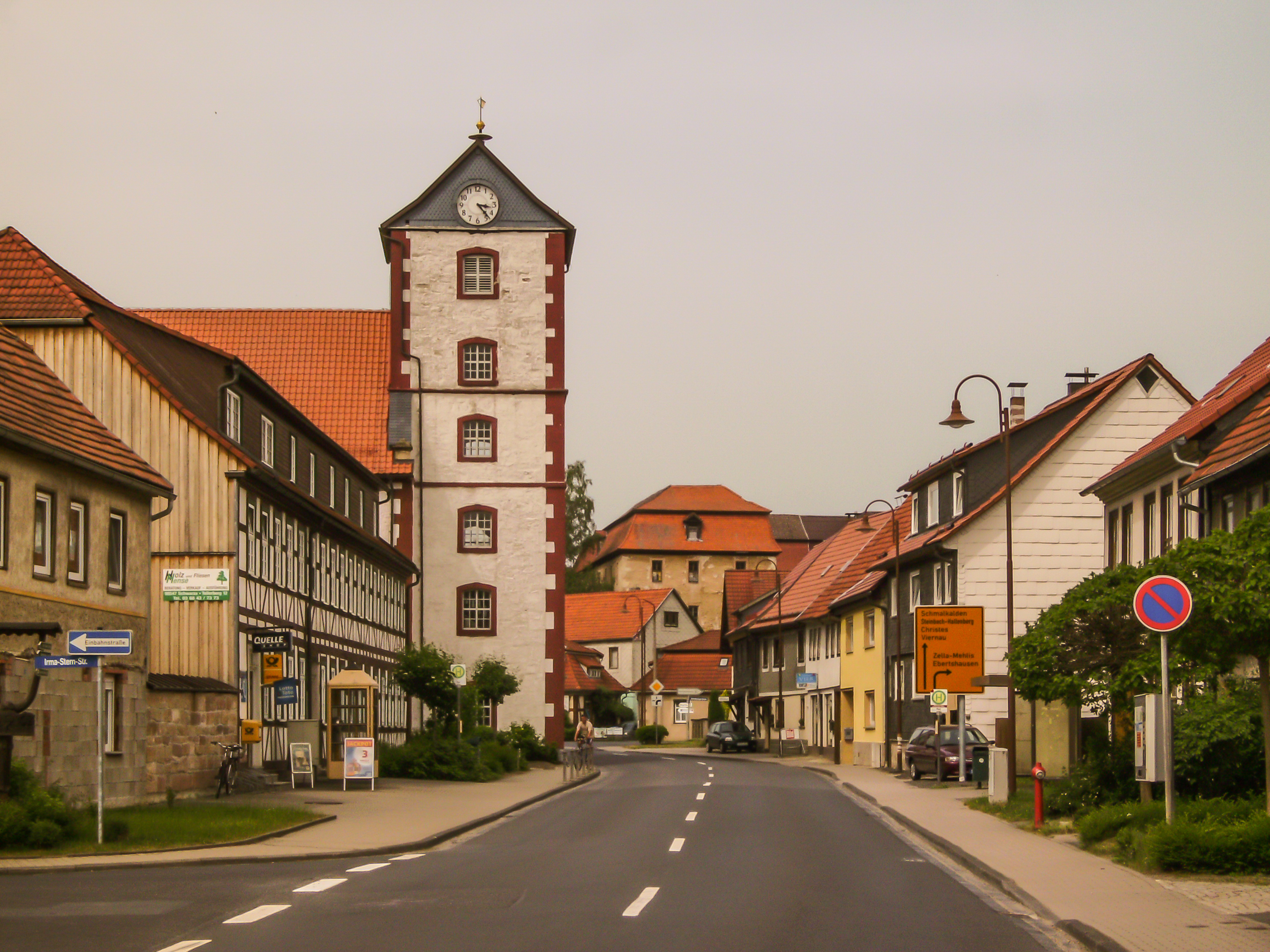
- Center of the village with the church tower

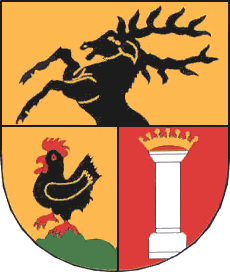
- Coat of arms

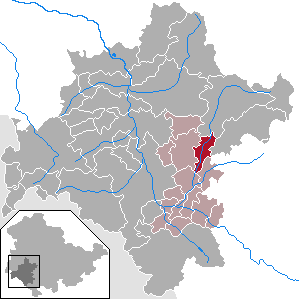
- Location of Schwarza within Schmalkalden-Meiningen district
- Interactive map of Schwarza
- Location within Germany Location within Thuringia
- Coordinates: 50°37′14″N 10°31′53″E
- Country: Germany
- State: Thuringia
- District: Schmalkalden-Meiningen
- Municipal assoc.: Dolmar-Salzbrücke

Government
  - Mayor (2022–28): Marco Rogowski

Area
  - Total: 13.51 km^{2} (5.22 sq mi)
- Elevation: 350 m (1,150 ft)

Population (2025-12-31)
  - Total: 1,090
  - Density: 80.7/km^{2} (209/sq mi)
- Time zone: UTC+01:00 (CET)
  - Summer (DST): UTC+02:00 (CEST)
- Postal codes: 98547
- Dialling codes: 036843
- Vehicle registration: SM

Schwarza (German pronunciation: [ˈʃvaʁtsa]) is a municipality in the Schmalkalden-Meiningen district, Thuringia, Germany. It lies between Zella-Mehlis and Meiningen.
