= Obermaßfeld-Grimmenthal =

- Municipality
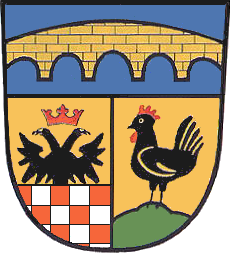
- Coat of arms

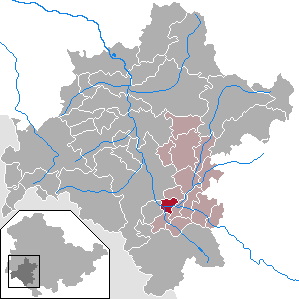
- Location of Obermaßfeld-Grimmenthal within Schmalkalden-Meiningen district
- Interactive map of Obermaßfeld-Grimmenthal
- Location within Germany Location within Thuringia
- Coordinates: 50°32′N 10°26′E
- Country: Germany
- State: Thuringia
- District: Schmalkalden-Meiningen
- Municipal assoc.: Dolmar-Salzbrücke

Government
  - Mayor (2021–27): Martin Hofmann

Area
  - Total: 5.59 km^{2} (2.16 sq mi)
- Elevation: 295 m (968 ft)

Population (2025-12-31)
  - Total: 1,179
  - Density: 211/km^{2} (546/sq mi)
- Time zone: UTC+01:00 (CET)
  - Summer (DST): UTC+02:00 (CEST)
- Postal codes: 98617
- Dialling codes: 036949
- Vehicle registration: SM
- Website: www.obermassfeld-grimmenthal.de

Obermaßfeld-Grimmenthal is a municipality in the district Schmalkalden-Meiningen, in Thuringia, Germany.

== History ==
Since 1498, it has been a place of pilgrimage. An early picture of Mary was said to have been miraculous. In 1498 a chapel was inaugurated. From the revenue the Obermaßfelder Werra bridge was built. In 1536, after the Reformation, the pilgrimage ended. Immediately thereafter, a hospital for the poor was created. After 1945, it was a retirement home, which existed until 1990.

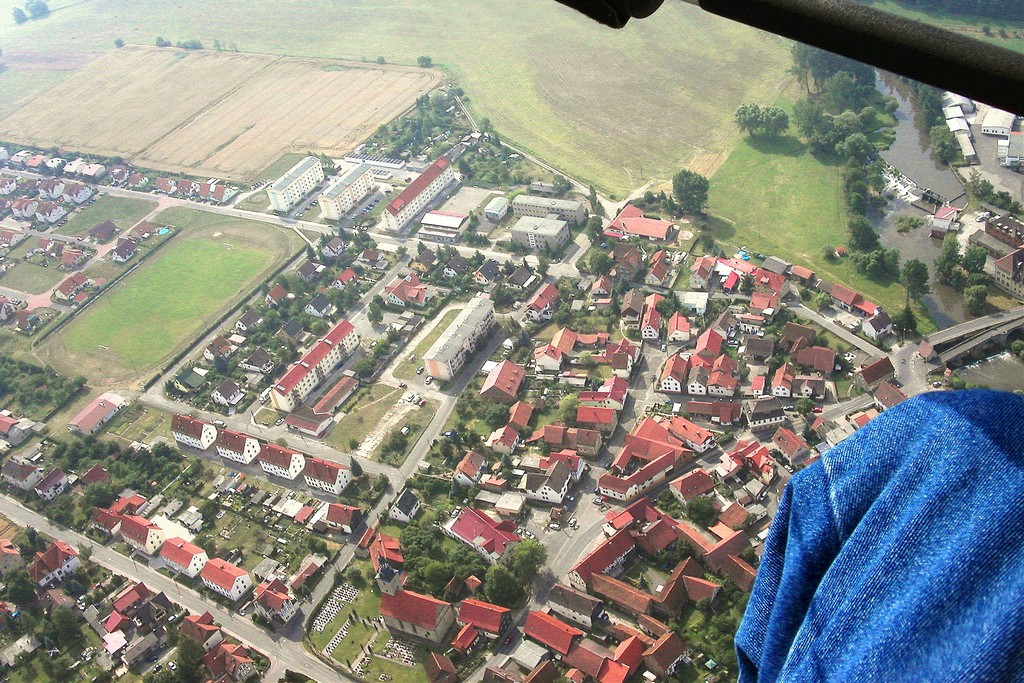
Aerial photo of Obermaßfeld

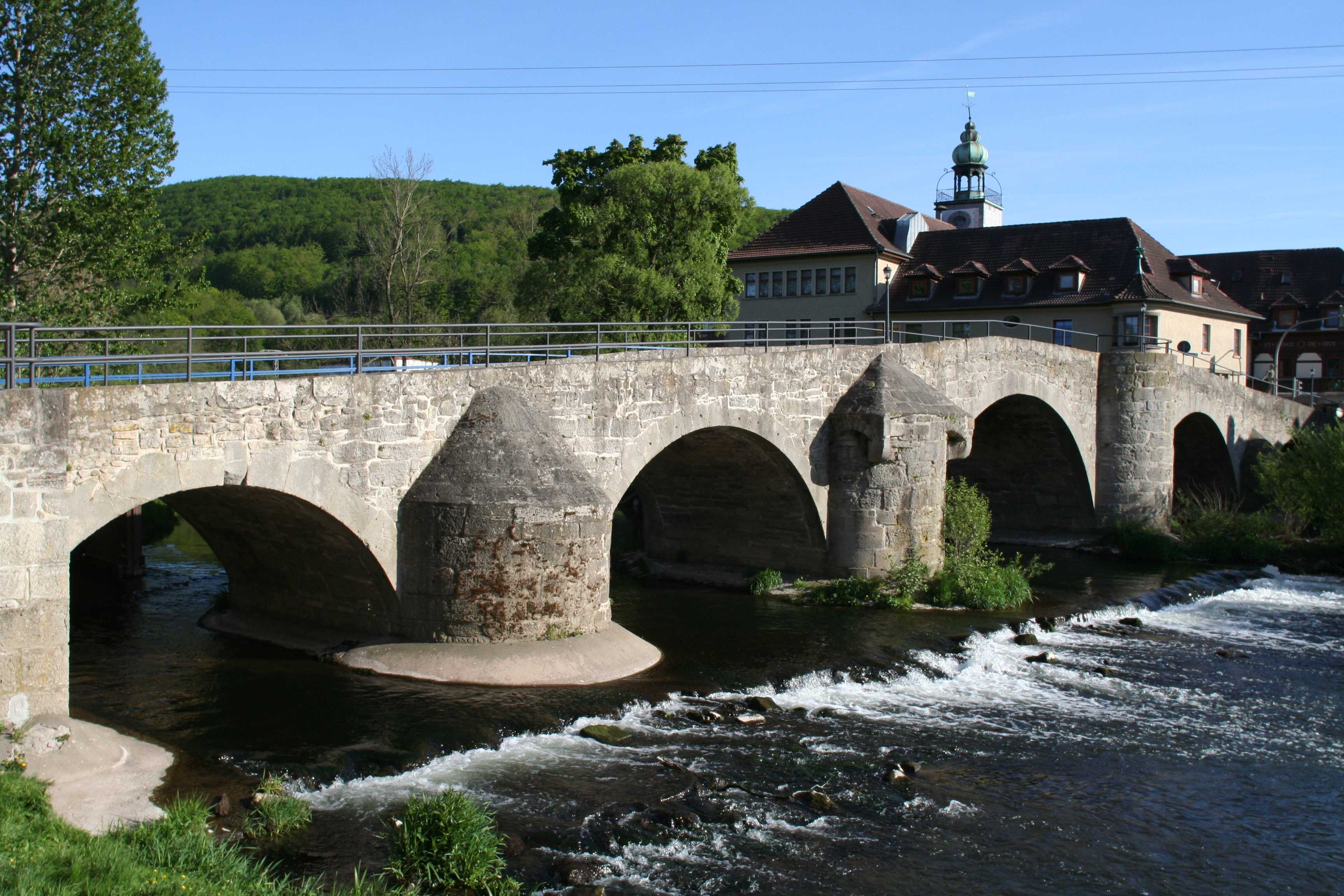
Werra bridge of 1534

=== Martin Luther criticism of pilgrimages to Grimmenthal ===
A chapel at Grimmenthal was erected by a Würzburg Captain which was dedicated by the Suffragan bishop of Würzburg Prince-bishop Lorenz von Bibra, Georg von Bipolis, on August 24, 1498. The number of pilgrims grew so much and the money came in so abundantly that a bigger church had to be built by the chapel which was inaugurated on May 1, 1502. Martin Luther was critical about this:

“Through the big fraud of the devil came about the pilgrimage of Grimmenthal servant and maids, shepards and women left their jobs and ran away to Grimmenthal. It’s right Grimmenthal, valley of fury (vallis furoris); and evidently nobody talks against it. The Bishop of Würzburg keeps his mouth closed and even agrees with this pilgrimage.”(daher ist kommen der grosse Betrug des Teufels mit den Wallfahrten in Grimmenthal, da Knecht und Mägde, Hirten, Weiber ihren Beruf liessen austehen und liefen dahin. Ist recht Grimmenthal, vallis furoris; da war Niemand, der ein Wort dawider geredet. Der Bishof von Würzburg schwieg stille dazu und williget darein.)
