= Kühndorf =

- Municipality
- Coat of arms

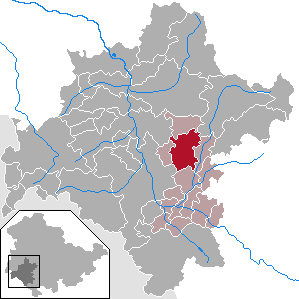
- Location of Kühndorf within Schmalkalden-Meiningen district
- Interactive map of Kühndorf
- Location within Germany Location within Thuringia
- Coordinates: 50°37′N 10°29′E
- Country: Germany
- State: Thuringia
- District: Schmalkalden-Meiningen
- Municipal assoc.: Dolmar-Salzbrücke

Government
  - Mayor (2024–30): Tobias Gebel

Area
  - Total: 26.04 km^{2} (10.05 sq mi)
- Elevation: 440 m (1,440 ft)

Population (2025-12-31)
  - Total: 870
  - Density: 33/km^{2} (87/sq mi)
- Time zone: UTC+01:00 (CET)
  - Summer (DST): UTC+02:00 (CEST)
- Postal codes: 98547
- Dialling codes: 036844
- Vehicle registration: SM

Kühndorf (German pronunciation: [ˈkyːndɔʁf]) is a municipality in the Schmalkalden-Meiningen district of Thuringia, Germany.
