= Ellingshausen =

- Municipality
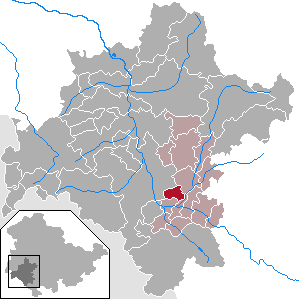
- Location of Ellingshausen within Schmalkalden-Meiningen district
- Interactive map of Ellingshausen
- Location within Germany Location within Thuringia
- Coordinates: 50°32′N 10°28′E
- Country: Germany
- State: Thuringia
- District: Schmalkalden-Meiningen
- Municipal assoc.: Dolmar-Salzbrücke

Government
  - Mayor (2022–28): Reiner Baumann (CDU)

Area
  - Total: 6.77 km^{2} (2.61 sq mi)
- Elevation: 310 m (1,020 ft)

Population (2025-12-31)
  - Total: 216
  - Density: 31.9/km^{2} (82.6/sq mi)
- Time zone: UTC+01:00 (CET)
  - Summer (DST): UTC+02:00 (CEST)
- Postal codes: 98617
- Dialling codes: 036949
- Vehicle registration: SM
- Website: www.vg-dolmar-salzbruecke.de

Ellingshausen (German pronunciation: [ɛlɪŋsˈhaʊzn̩]) is a municipality in the district Schmalkalden-Meiningen, Thuringia, Germany.
