= Leutersdorf, Thuringia =

Leutersdorf
- Municipality
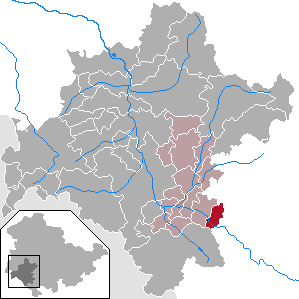
- Location of Leutersdorf within Schmalkalden-Meiningen district
- Interactive map of Leutersdorf
- Location within Germany Location within Thuringia
- Coordinates: 50°31′N 10°33′E
- Country: Germany
- State: Thuringia
- District: Schmalkalden-Meiningen
- Municipal assoc.: Dolmar-Salzbrücke

Government
  - Mayor (2022–28): Frank Ehrenberger (CDU)

Area
  - Total: 8.39 km^{2} (3.24 sq mi)
- Elevation: 325 m (1,066 ft)

Population (2025-12-31)
  - Total: 216
  - Density: 25.7/km^{2} (66.7/sq mi)
- Time zone: UTC+01:00 (CET)
  - Summer (DST): UTC+02:00 (CEST)
- Postal codes: 98617
- Dialling codes: 036949
- Vehicle registration: SM
- Website: www.vg-dolmar-salzbruecke.de

Leutersdorf (German pronunciation: [ˈlɔʏtɐsdɔʁf]) is a municipality in the Schmalkalden-Meiningen district of Thuringia, Germany.
