= Belrieth =

- Municipality
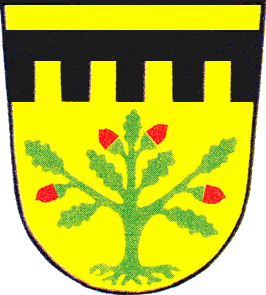
- Coat of arms

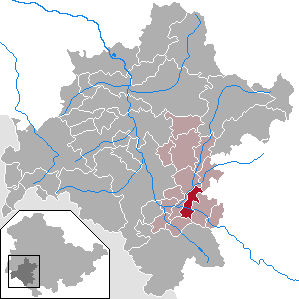
- Location of Belrieth within Schmalkalden-Meiningen district
- Interactive map of Belrieth
- Location within Germany Location within Thuringia
- Coordinates: 50°31′N 10°30′E
- Country: Germany
- State: Thuringia
- District: Schmalkalden-Meiningen
- Municipal assoc.: Dolmar-Salzbrücke

Government
  - Mayor (2019–25): Dieter Antler

Area
  - Total: 9.93 km^{2} (3.83 sq mi)
- Elevation: 311 m (1,020 ft)

Population (2025-12-31)
  - Total: 325
  - Density: 32.7/km^{2} (84.8/sq mi)
- Time zone: UTC+01:00 (CET)
  - Summer (DST): UTC+02:00 (CEST)
- Postal codes: 98617
- Dialling codes: 036949
- Vehicle registration: SM
- Website: www.belrieth.de

Belrieth is a municipality in the district Schmalkalden-Meiningen, in Thuringia, Germany.
