= Utendorf =

- Municipality
- Coat of arms

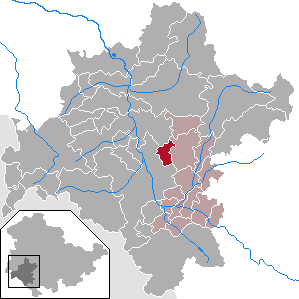
- Location of Utendorf within Schmalkalden-Meiningen district
- Interactive map of Utendorf
- Location within Germany Location within Thuringia
- Coordinates: 50°37′N 10°26′E
- Country: Germany
- State: Thuringia
- District: Schmalkalden-Meiningen
- Municipal assoc.: Dolmar-Salzbrücke

Government
  - Mayor (2019–25): Martin Thiel

Area
  - Total: 8.09 km^{2} (3.12 sq mi)
- Elevation: 380 m (1,250 ft)

Population (2025-12-31)
  - Total: 418
  - Density: 51.7/km^{2} (134/sq mi)
- Time zone: UTC+01:00 (CET)
  - Summer (DST): UTC+02:00 (CEST)
- Postal codes: 98617
- Dialling codes: 03693
- Vehicle registration: SM
- Website: www.vg-dolmar.de

Utendorf is a municipality in the district Schmalkalden-Meiningen, in Thuringia, Germany.
