= Norheim (surname) =

Norheim is a Norwegian surname. Notable people with the surname include:

- John Olav Norheim (born 1995), Norwegian footballer
- Kristian Norheim (born 1976), Norwegian politician
- Sondre Norheim (1825–1897), Norwegian skier and pioneer of modern skiing
