= Dillstädt =

- Municipality
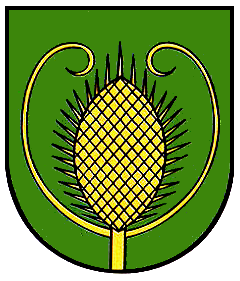
- Coat of arms

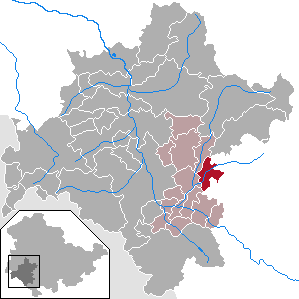
- Location of Dillstädt within Schmalkalden-Meiningen district
- Interactive map of Dillstädt
- Location within Germany Location within Thuringia
- Coordinates: 50°35′N 10°32′E
- Country: Germany
- State: Thuringia
- District: Schmalkalden-Meiningen
- Municipal assoc.: Dolmar-Salzbrücke

Government
  - Mayor (2022–28): Liane Bach

Area
  - Total: 13.97 km^{2} (5.39 sq mi)
- Elevation: 340 m (1,120 ft)

Population (2025-12-31)
  - Total: 711
  - Density: 50.9/km^{2} (132/sq mi)
- Time zone: UTC+01:00 (CET)
  - Summer (DST): UTC+02:00 (CEST)
- Postal codes: 98530
- Dialling codes: 036846
- Vehicle registration: SM
- Website: www.dillstaedt.de

Dillstädt (German pronunciation: [ˈdɪlʃtɛt]) is a municipality in the district Schmalkalden-Meiningen, in Thuringia, Germany.
