= Nordheim (surname) =

Nordheim is a Norwegian surname. Notable people with the surname include:

- Arne Nordheim (1931–2010), Norwegian composer
- Kari Nordheim-Larsen (born 1948), Norwegian politician
- Lothar Wolfgang Nordheim (1899–1985), German-born American theoretical physicist
- Otto of Nordheim, Duke of Bavaria
