= Christes =

- Municipality
- Coat of arms

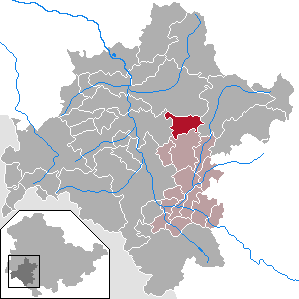
- Location of Christes within Schmalkalden-Meiningen district
- Interactive map of Christes
- Location within Germany Location within Thuringia
- Coordinates: 50°40′N 10°29′E
- Country: Germany
- State: Thuringia
- District: Schmalkalden-Meiningen
- Municipal assoc.: Dolmar-Salzbrücke

Government
  - Mayor (2022–28): Frank Liebaug

Area
  - Total: 15.46 km^{2} (5.97 sq mi)
- Elevation: 450 m (1,480 ft)

Population (2025-12-31)
  - Total: 524
  - Density: 33.9/km^{2} (87.8/sq mi)
- Time zone: UTC+01:00 (CET)
  - Summer (DST): UTC+02:00 (CEST)
- Postal codes: 98547
- Dialling codes: 036844
- Vehicle registration: SM
- Website: www.gemeinde-christes.de

Christes is a municipality in the district Schmalkalden-Meiningen, in Thuringia, Germany.
