= Vachdorf =

- Municipality
- Coat of arms

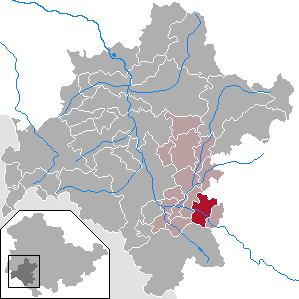
- Location of Vachdorf within Schmalkalden-Meiningen district
- Interactive map of Vachdorf
- Location within Germany Location within Thuringia
- Coordinates: 50°32′N 10°32′E
- Country: Germany
- State: Thuringia
- District: Schmalkalden-Meiningen
- Municipal assoc.: Dolmar-Salzbrücke

Government
  - Mayor (2022–28): Andreas Baumann

Area
  - Total: 15.90 km^{2} (6.14 sq mi)
- Elevation: 320 m (1,050 ft)

Population (2025-12-31)
  - Total: 740
  - Density: 47/km^{2} (120/sq mi)
- Time zone: UTC+01:00 (CET)
  - Summer (DST): UTC+02:00 (CEST)
- Postal codes: 98617
- Dialling codes: 036949
- Vehicle registration: SM

Vachdorf (German pronunciation: [ˈfaxˌdɔʁf]) is a municipality in the district Schmalkalden-Meiningen, in Thuringia, Germany.
