= Neubrunn, Thuringia =

Neubrunn
- Municipality
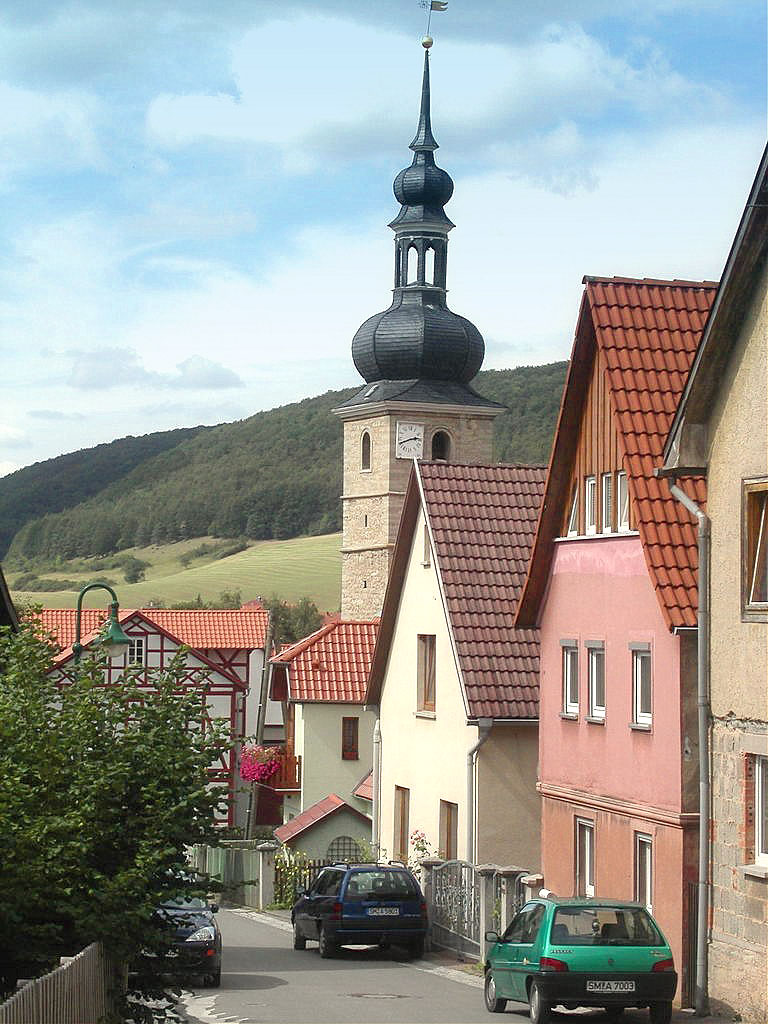

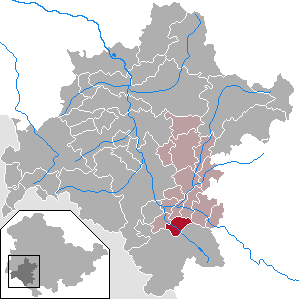
- Location of Neubrunn within Schmalkalden-Meiningen district
- Interactive map of Neubrunn
- Location within Germany Location within Thuringia
- Coordinates: 50°29′58″N 10°28′5″E
- Country: Germany
- State: Thuringia
- District: Schmalkalden-Meiningen
- Municipal assoc.: Dolmar-Salzbrücke

Government
  - Mayor (2022–28): Arno Schimpf (CDU)

Area
  - Total: 9.24 km^{2} (3.57 sq mi)
- Elevation: 320 m (1,050 ft)

Population (2025-12-31)
  - Total: 522
  - Density: 56.5/km^{2} (146/sq mi)
- Time zone: UTC+01:00 (CET)
  - Summer (DST): UTC+02:00 (CEST)
- Postal codes: 98617
- Dialling codes: 036947
- Vehicle registration: SM
- Website: www.vg-dolmar-salzbruecke.de

Neubrunn (German pronunciation: [ˈnɔʏbʁʊn]) is a municipality in Southwest Thuringia in Landkreis Schmalkalden-Meiningen, 10 km (6 mi) from Meiningen.
