= Einhausen, Thuringia =

Einhausen
- Municipality
- Coat of arms

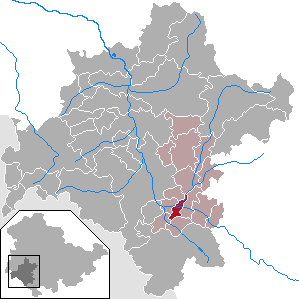
- Location of Einhausen within Schmalkalden-Meiningen district
- Interactive map of Einhausen
- Location within Germany Location within Thuringia
- Coordinates: 50°31′N 10°28′E
- Country: Germany
- State: Thuringia
- District: Schmalkalden-Meiningen
- Municipal assoc.: Dolmar-Salzbrücke

Government
  - Mayor (2022–28): Lothar Ritzmann

Area
  - Total: 5.33 km^{2} (2.06 sq mi)
- Elevation: 305 m (1,001 ft)

Population (2025-12-31)
  - Total: 410
  - Density: 77/km^{2} (200/sq mi)
- Time zone: UTC+01:00 (CET)
  - Summer (DST): UTC+02:00 (CEST)
- Postal codes: 98617
- Dialling codes: 036949
- Vehicle registration: SM
- Website: www.vg-dolmar-salzbruecke.de

Einhausen (German pronunciation: [aɪnˈhaʊzn̩]) is a municipality in the district Schmalkalden-Meiningen, in Thuringia, Germany.
