= Schmalkalden-Meiningen =

Coordinates: 50°40′N 10°25′E

- District
- Flag Coat of arms
- Country: Germany
- State: Thuringia
- Capital: Meiningen

Government
  - District admin.: Peggy Greiser (Ind.)

Area
  - Total: 1,251.20 km^{2} (483.09 sq mi)

Population (31 December 2025)
  - Total: 120,214
  - Density: 96.0790/km^{2} (248.843/sq mi)
- Time zone: UTC+01:00 (CET)
  - Summer (DST): UTC+02:00 (CEST)
- Vehicle registration: SM, MGN
- Website: www.lra-sm.de

Schmalkalden-Meiningen is a Landkreis in the southwest of Thuringia, Germany. Its neighboring districts are (from the northwest clockwise) the districts Wartburgkreis, Gotha, Ilm-Kreis, the district-free city Suhl, the district Hildburghausen, the Bavarian district Rhön-Grabfeld, and the district Fulda in Hesse.

== History ==
The district is located mainly on the territory of the former duchy of Saxe-Meiningen (part Meiningen district) and the former dominion of Schmalkalden. The district as a unit originated in 1994 with the merging of the previous districts Meiningen, Schmalkalden and (partially) Suhl-Land, which were formed during the time in the GDR. The municipality Kaltennordheim passed from the Wartburgkreis to Schmalkalden-Meiningen on 1 January 2019.

== Geography ==
The main river in Schmalkalden-Meiningen is the Werra. The landscape of the district consists of the Rhön Mountains in the west and the Thuringian Forest Mountains in the east, separated by the valley of the river Werra. To the south lies the hilly Grabfeld. The Rennsteig hiking path crosses the Thuringian Forest and is the Border to Gotha district. The area around Oberhof is a famous winter sports resort. The capital Meiningen in the center of the district lies at an altitude of 287 meters above the sea. The lowest point is 250 meters in Breitungen. The highest mountain is the Wildekopf mountain with 943 meters near Zella-Mehlis.

== Culture and economy ==
Meiningen is a cultural city with a famous theater and an old traditional Court orchestra. The city has a classical cityscape with extensive parks. Featured castles are in Meiningen and in Schmalkalden. Economically are significant mechanical engineering, high technology, tool manufacturing and food industry.

== Coat of arms ==
The coat of arms of Schmalkalden-Meiningen shows symbols from the coats of arms of the three precursor districts, which also symbolise the historic states which formerly ruled in the territory of the district. The rooster in the top left derives from the coat of arms of the counts of Henneberg. It stands on three green mounds, a reminder of the hills and mountains of the area. The lion of Hesse appears in the top right canton, as Hesse controlled the area from 1360 to 1866. The banner in the bottom left comes from the coat of arms of the district of Meiningen, and derives from the coat of arms of the city of Würzburg. The prince-bishops of Würzburg owned Meiningen in the past. The coat of arms of Saxony in the bottom right recalls the duchy of Saxe-Meiningen, which existed from 1680 until 1918.

== Towns and municipalities ==
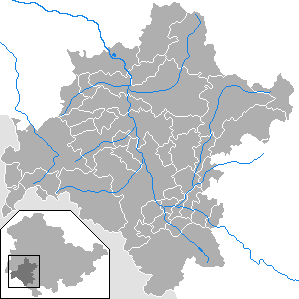
Clickable map of towns and municipalities in the district

Verwaltungsgemeinschaft-free towns
and municipalities
1. Brotterode-Trusetal
2. Meiningen
3. Oberhof
4. Schmalkalden
5. Steinbach-Hallenberg
6. Zella-Mehlis
1. Breitungen
2. Fambach
3. Floh-Seligenthal
4. Grabfeld
5. Rhönblick
6. Rippershausen
7. Rosa
8. Roßdorf
9. Untermaßfeld

Verwaltungsgemeinschaften
1. Dolmar-Salzbrücke; 1. Belrieth; 2. Christes; 3. Dillstädt; 4. Einhausen; 5. Ellingshausen; 6. Kühndorf; 7. Leutersdorf; 8. Neubrunn; 9. Obermaßfeld-Grimmenthal; 10. Ritschenhausen; 11. Rohr; 12. Schwarza^{1}; 13. Utendorf; 14. Vachdorf	2. Hohe Rhön; 1. Birx; 2. Erbenhausen; 3. Frankenheim; 4. Kaltennordheim^{1, 2}; 5. Oberweid	3. Wasungen-Amt Sand; 1. Friedelshausen; 2. Mehmels; 3. Schwallungen; 4. Wasungen^{1, 2}
^{1}seat of the Verwaltungsgemeinschaft;^{2}town
