= Salzungen Werra Upland =

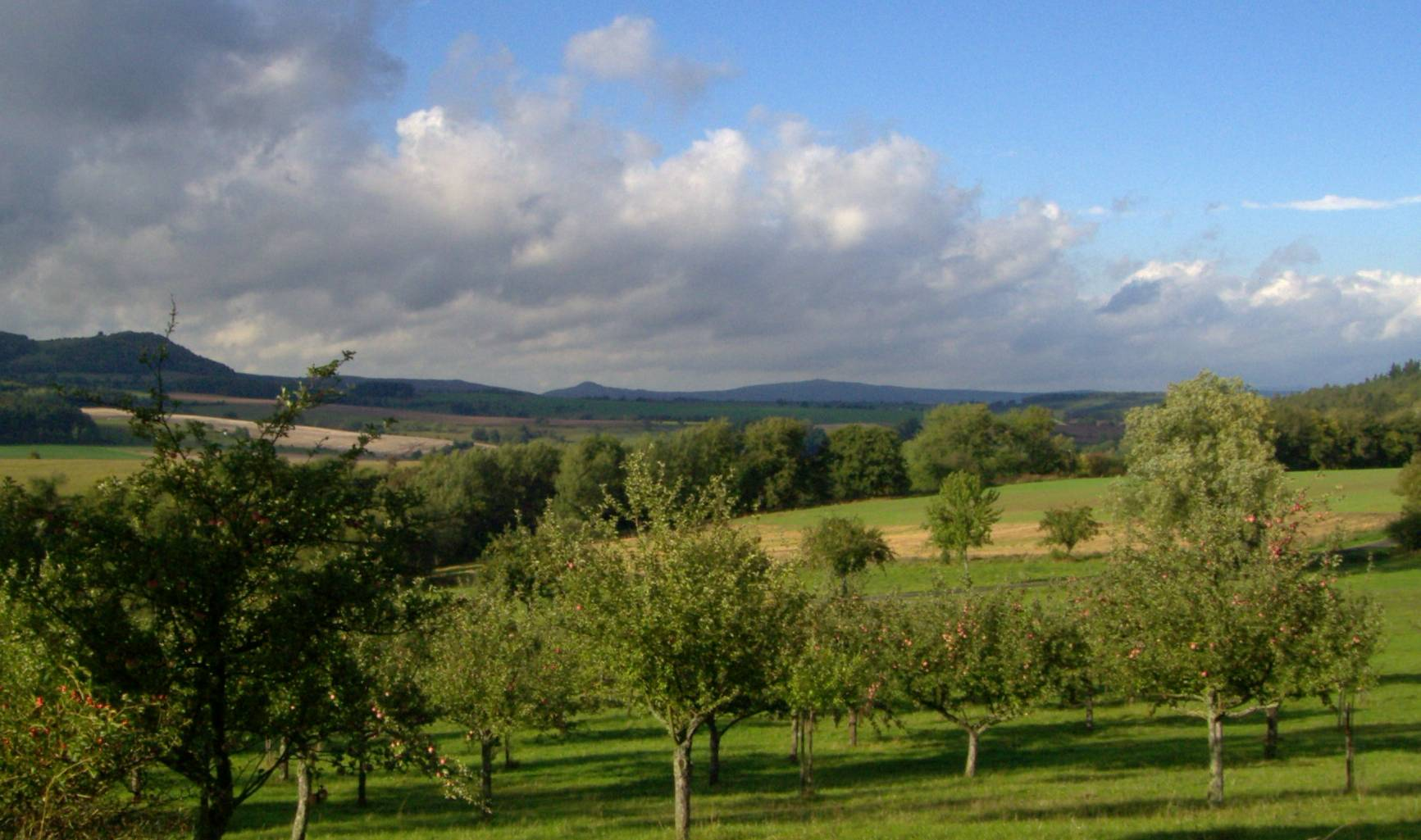
View of the Pleß (rear) and Stoffelskuppe (left)

The Salzungen Werra Upland (German: Salzunger Werrabergland) is a natural region in Germany that forms part of the East Hesse Highlands in the German states of Hesse and Thuringia.

== Location ==
The Salzungen Werra Upland lies on either side of the Werra near Bad Salzungen. It has a plateau-like character, lies at a height of between 350 and 645.4 m above sea level (NN) and extends from the northwestern Thuringian Forest (to the east), to the Kuppen Rhön (to the west) and the forest of Seulingswald (to the northwest). It accompanies the River Werra on both sides from Walldorf to Vacha, continuing on its right bank only as far as Gerstungen.

== Geology ==
The upland's main rock is bunter sandstone, from which emerge several, less volcanic kuppen like the Pleß and Stoffelskuppe, whose phenotype presages the Kuppen Rhön that lies to the west. Salt tectonics have resulted in hollows and sinkholes.

== Natural regions ==
The Salzungen Werra Upland is a major natural region unit (no. 359) within the major unit group of the East Hesse Highlands (number 35 or D47). The valleys of the Werra and Suhl, which mainly run in a northwesterly direction, divide the upland into 3 orographic mountain regions, of which only the central Frauensee Hills (Frauenseer Hügelland) are independent.

359 Salzungen Werra Upland (Salzunger Werrabergland)

- 359.0 Stadtlengsfeld Hill Country (Stadtlengsfelder Hügelland)
  - 359.00 Eastern Slopes of the Kuppen Rhön (Ostabdachung der Kuppenrhön) (inter alia with the Pleß and Stoffelskuppe as well as the lower reaches of the Felda)
  - 359.01 Lower Ulster valley (Unteres Ulstertal)
- 359.1 Salzungen-Herleshausen Werra Valley (Salzungen-Herleshausener Werratal)
  - 359.10 Salzungen Basin (Salzunger Becken)
  - 359.11 Dorndorf-Heringen Werra Valley (Dorndorf-Heringer-Werratal)
  - 359.12 Berka Basin (Berkaer Becken)
  - 359.13 Neustädt-Hörschel Werra Valley (Neustädt-Hörscheler Werratal)
- 359.2 Frauenseer Hill Country (Frauenseer Hügelland)
- 359.3 Suhl-Fischgraben Valleys
- 359.4 Oberelle Hill Country (Obereller Hügelland)

== Mountains and hills ==
Among the mountains and hills of the Salzungen Werra Upland are the following − with heights in metres above sea level (NN):

- Pleß (645.4 m)
- Stoffelskuppe (620 m)
- Krücke (604 m)
- Gotteskopf (576 m)
- Schneckenberg (528 m)
- Bornkopf (479 m)
- Großer Krötenkopf (457 m)
- Aschenberg (452 m)
- Röhrberg (452 m)

== Rivers and streams ==
Among the rivers and streams (all in the Werra catchment) of the Salzungen Werra Upland are the following (downstream from south to north, with lengths in kilometres and mouth locations):

Left tributaries of the Werra:

- Herpf (21.7 km, 95.3 km²), near Walldorf (southern boundary)
- Katza (15.1 km, 61.3 km²), near Wasungen
- Schwarzbach (11.1 km, 39.5 km²), south of Schwallungen
- Zillbach (4.6 km, 12.6 km²), north of Schwallungen
- Rosabach (13.0 km, 39.7 km²), near Wernshausen
- Pfitzbach (12.3 km, 34.4 km²)
- Felda (42.2 km, 216.7 km²), near Dorndorf
- Oechse (16.0 km, 61.6 km²), near Vacha (northwestern boundary)

Right tributaries of the Werra:

- Helba (??? km, 25.3 km²), in Meiningen
- Wallbach (11 km, 24.7 km²), near Wallbach
- Schmalkalde (24.9 km, 156.4 km²), near Niederschmalkalden
- Fambach (??? km, > 10 km²), near Fambach
- Truse (15 km, 46.2 km²), near Breitungen
- Farnbach (??? km, > 10 km²), near Breitungen
- Grumbach (12 km, > 10 km²), near Breitungen
- Schweina (11 km, > 10 km²), near Barchfeld
- Fischgraben (??? km, 32.1 km²), near Barchfeld
- Rohrgraben (7 km, > 10 km²), near Unterrohn
- Schergesbach (??? km, > 10 km²), near Kieselbach
- Bach aus Oberzella (??? km, > 10.9 km²), near Unterzella
- Schwarzer Graben (??? km, 10.3 km²), near Heringen-Widdershausen
- right Suhl (22,3 km, 91,3 km²), near Untersuhl
- Elte (22,5 km, 81,0 km²), near Lauchröden
