= Gebaberg =

Highest point in the Rhön Mountains, Thuringia, Germany

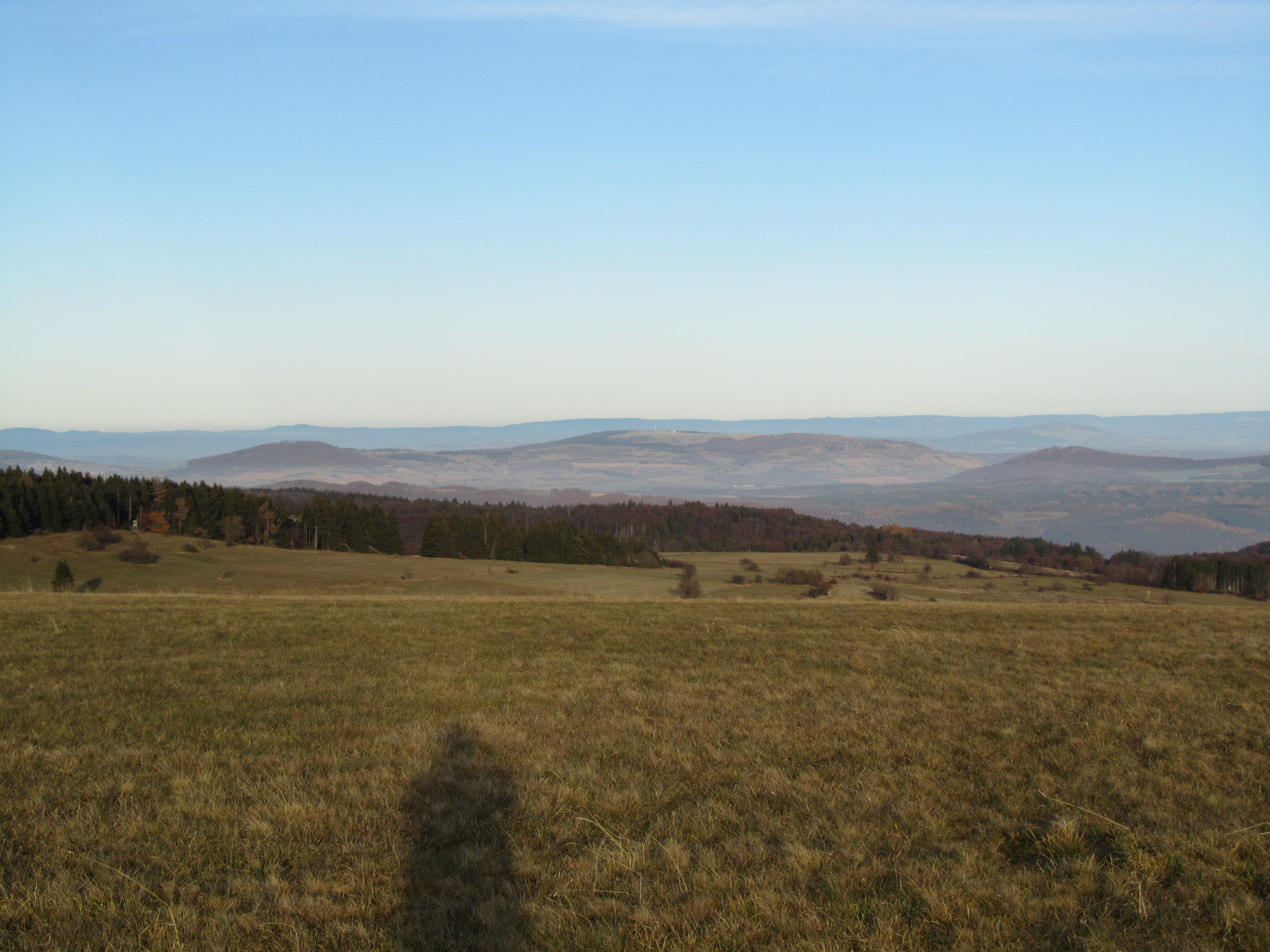
- View from the Rhön looking northeast to the Geba in the centre. In the background is the Thuringian Forest

Highest point
- Elevation: 750.7 m (2,464 ft)
- Prominence: 226 m (741 ft)
- Isolation: 18.5 km (11.5 mi)
- Coordinates: 50°35′24″N 10°16′17″E

Geography
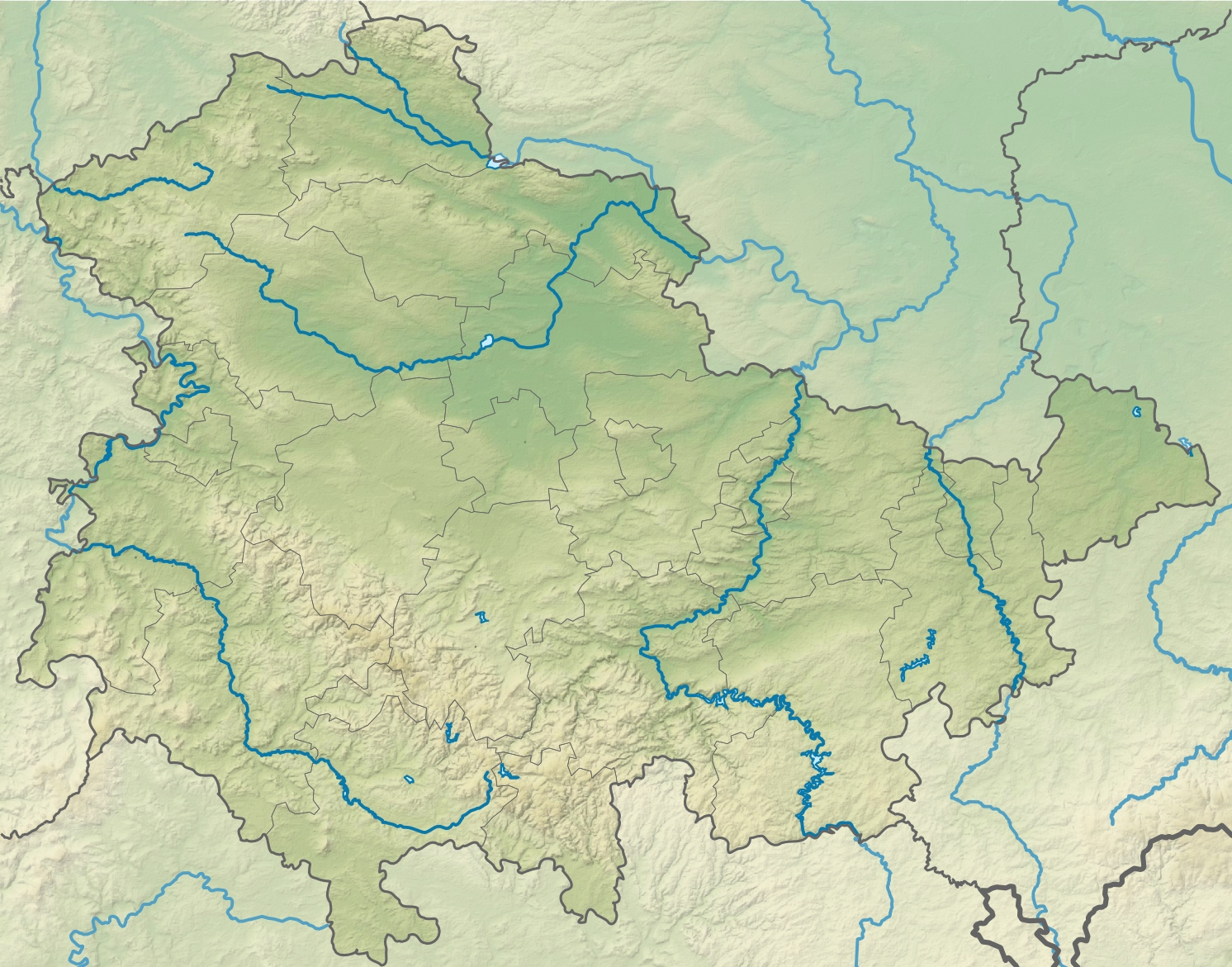
- Location within Thuringia
- Location: Near Geba, Schmalkalden-Meiningen, Thuringia, Germany
- Parent range: Rhön Anterior Rhön

Climbing
- Normal route: accessible by road

The Gebaberg, also called the Hohe Geba or Die Geba, near Geba in the county of Schmalkalden-Meiningen in southern Thuringia, Germany, is 750.7 m above sea level (NHN), and thus the highest point of the Anterior Rhön (Vorderer Rhön).

== Location ==
The mountain is located about 11 kilometres west of the county town of Meiningen.

In the south of the broad summit plateau lies the village of Geba, in the north is the highest point of the mountain which has a walking hut and cafe. At the southern foot of the massif, in the valley of the Herpf river are the villages of Wohlmuthausen, Helmershausen and Bettenhausen which, like the village of Seeba to the southeast, belong to the municipality of Rhönblick. On the eastern slopes of the Geba lies the village of Träbes with the sinkhole of Träbeser Loch and in the valley lie the villages of Stepfershausen and Herpf, the latter is in the borough of Meiningen. North of the Geba is the Katzgrund valley with its villages Unterkatz and Oberkatz. In the northwest behind the Diesburg is the village of Aschenhausen.

== Description ==
Also part of the extensive massif are the tops of Neidhardskopf (721 m) in the south, the Hohe Löhr (638 m) and the Diesburg (713 m) in the west.

At the edge of the wooded summit plateau there is an observation knoll with a panoramic view of the Bavarian, Hessian and Thuringian Rhön, the Thuringian Forest, the Haßbergen and the Hoher Meißner.

== History ==
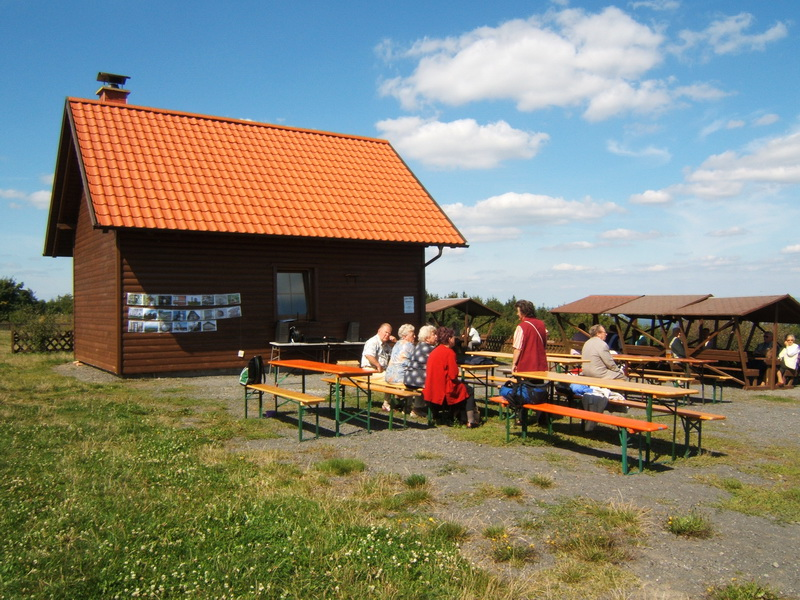
The Meiningen Hut

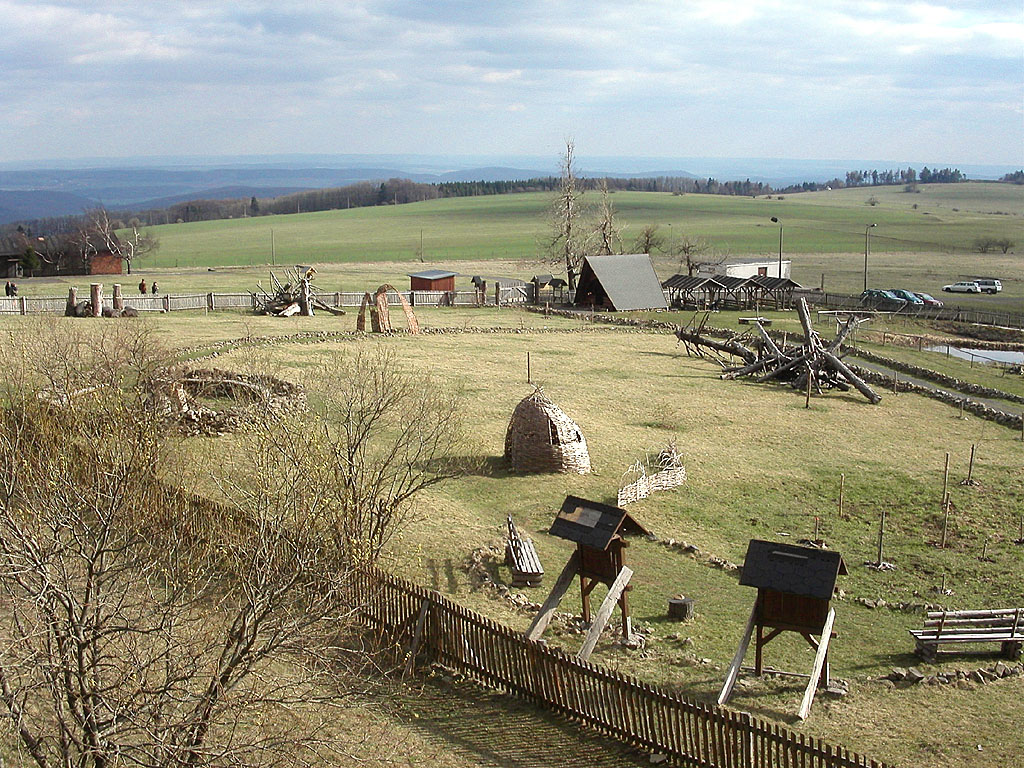
Celtic village under construction

In 1867 the Duchy of Saxe-Meiningen had the first surveys carried out on the Geba, during which the first log cabin was built as protection from the weather. On 2 June 1897 the first Meininger Hut (Meininger Hütte) was inaugurated in the presence of Duke George II. The hut was later extended. In the decades that followed, the Geba developed into a popular destination for walkers and holidaymakers looking for peace and relaxation, thanks to its good views.

From 1945 to 1962 the building was used by the Free German Youth (FDJ) as a youth hostel. Thereafter, the Soviet Army occupied the highest point of the summit plateau and built a radar station. The terrain was placed out of bounds and was no longer accessible to local people and visitors.

At the end of the 1960s, a local German firm built a barracks for the Soviet Army. In "House I" (today the Gebatreff) was an armoury, a political room for education, a dormitory for 120 soldiers, a kitchen, a dressing chamber, dining rooms and simple toilets and bathrooms. On 22 April 1991 the Soviet soldiers left and House 1 was gutted as part of the post-reunification job creation program.

In 1998 the Meiningen Hut was re-opened by the Meiningen branch of the Rhön Club on its historic site. It contains a lounge with a stove and a dormitory. In addition, in 1999 a Rhön cultural garden, 3 hectares in area, was laid out at the summit with a reconstruction of a Celtic village. In the late 1990s the barracks were gradually converted and today they house the Bergstübchen cafe, an event hall, a club lounge, a training room, the Russian museum, Дружба ("Friendship") and an information point for the Geba Tourist Association (Fremdenverkehrsverein Geba e.V.).

On 28 August 2005 the Rhön Club inaugurated a metal table on the observation knoll with 40 direction indicators for places in the Rhön, the Werra valley and the Thuringian Forest.

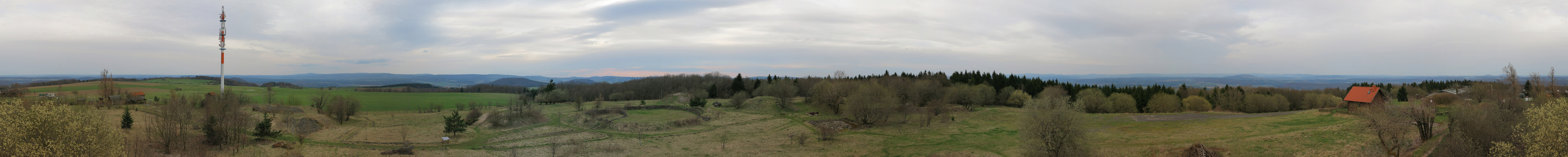
Panoramic view (360°) from the observation knoll

In early 2014 the county council in Meiningen announced that it wanted to build a 70-metre-high, sloping observation tower on the summit at an angle of 23.5°. In September 2014 the construction was rejected in a county-wide referendum. By contrast, all the municipalities with a share in the Gebaberg voted for the leaning tower.

== Walks ==
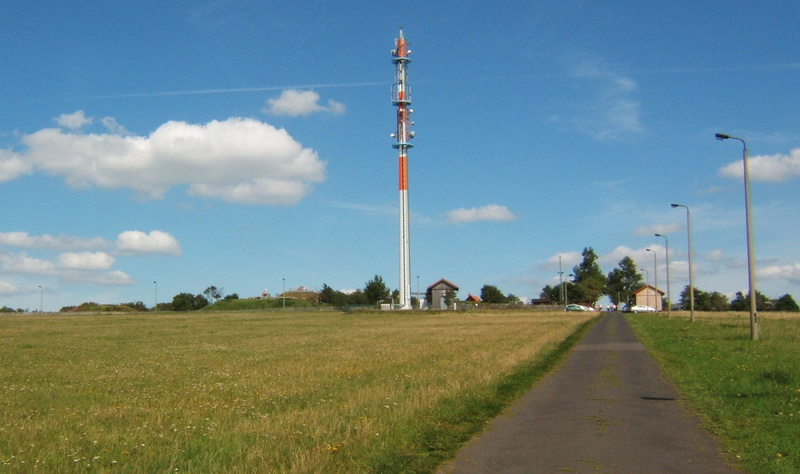
View from the road

The following run over the Geba:

- the Geba Way (Gebaweg), an Extra tour of the Hochrhöner
- the Julius Greif circular walk with a stone monument
- the Milseburg Way (HWO3)
- the Rhön-Rennsteig Path, which links the Geba with Aschenhausen and Stepfershausen.
- the Thüringian Rhön Path

== See also ==
- List of mountains and hills of the Rhön
