= Katza =

Location
- Country: Germany
- States: Thuringia

Physical characteristics
- Mouth
  - location: Werra
  - coordinates: 50.6575°N 10.3681°E

Basin features
- Progression: Werra→ Weser→ North Sea

Katza is a river of Thuringia, Germany. It is a tributary of the Werra.

The river is 15 km long. It rises southwest of Oberkatz, then follows a northeasterly course along the Landesstraße 2619, passing Unterkatz, Wahns and Mehmels, until it flows into the Werra at Wasungen.

The river was first mentioned in writing in 1323. Its name is not derived from the German word for 'cat' (German: Katze), but may come from the Indo-European word for 'ditch'.

== See also ==
- List of rivers of Thuringia
