= Humbach (Schwarzbach) =

Location
- Country: Germany
- State: Thuringia

Physical characteristics
- Source
  - location: Northwest of Hümpfershausen
  - coordinates: 50.6709°N 10.2193°E
- Mouth
  - location: Between Hümpfershausen and Schwarzbach (a district of Schwallungen) into the Schwarzbach
  - coordinates: 50.6747°N 10.2652°E

Basin features
- Progression: Schwarzbach→ Werra→ Weser→ North Sea

Humbach is a river of Thuringia, Germany.

The Humbach springs northwest of Hümpfershausen. It is a right tributary of the Schwarzbach between Hümpfershausen and Schwarzbach (a district of Schwallungen).

== See also ==
- List of rivers of Thuringia
