= Humbach =

Humbach may refer to:

- Humbach (Ilm), a river of Thuringia, Germany, tributary of the Ilm
- Humbach (Schwarzbach), a river of Thuringia, Germany, tributary of the Schwarzbach
