= Arthur Rudolph =

German rocket engineer (1906–1996)

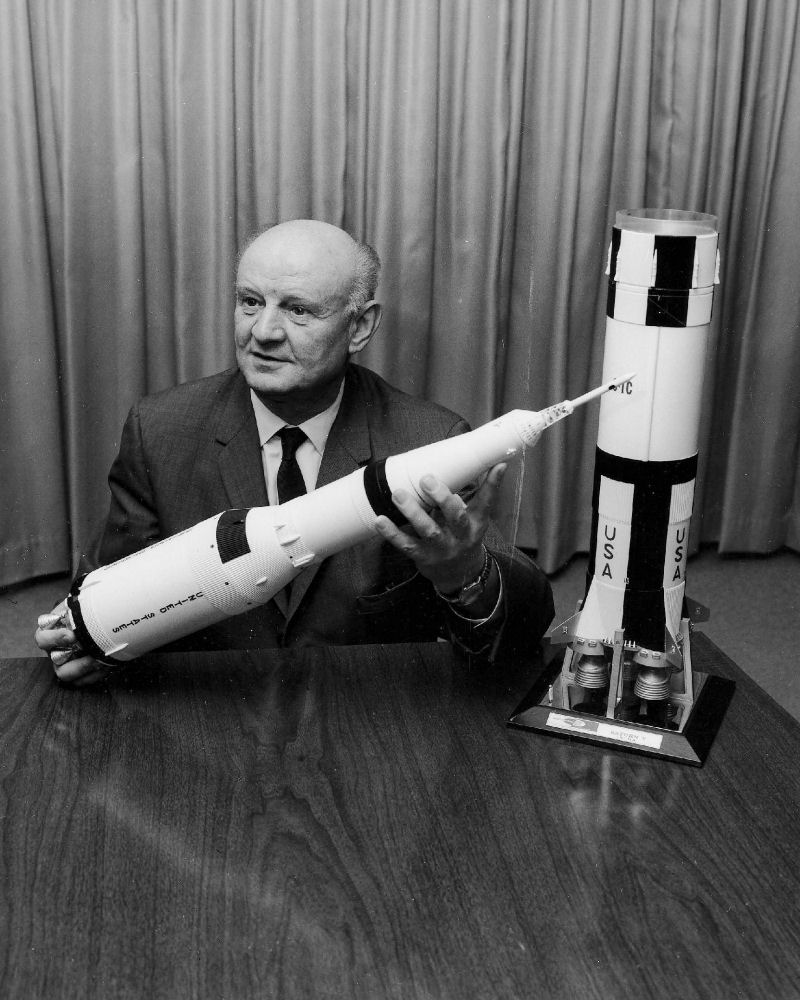
- Rudolph showing a model of the Saturn V
- Born: Arthur Louis Hugo Rudolph; November 9, 1906; Stepfershausen, Saxe-Meiningen Germany
- Died: January 1, 1996 (aged 89); Hamburg, Germany
- Citizenship: Germany; United States (1954–1984)
- Education: Technische Universität Berlin
- Occupation: Rocket engineer
- Known for: V-2, Saturn V
- Spouse: Martha Therese Kohls (m. 1935)
- Children: 1
- Awards: Honorary Doctor of Science; Department of the Army Decoration for Exceptional Civilian Service; NASA Exceptional Service Medal; NASA Distinguished Service Medal

Arthur Louis Hugo Rudolph (November 9, 1906 – January 1, 1996) was a German rocket engineer who was a leader of the effort to develop the V-2 rocket. After World War II, the United States government's Office of Strategic Services (OSS) brought him to the U.S. as part of the clandestine Operation Paperclip, where he became one of the main developers of the U.S. space program. He worked within the U.S. Army and NASA, where he managed the development of several systems, including the Pershing missile and the Saturn V Moon rocket. In 1984, the U.S. government investigated him for war crimes, and he agreed to renounce his United States citizenship and leave the U.S. in return for not being prosecuted.

== Early life ==
Rudolph was born in Stepfershausen, a village of Meiningen, in 1906. His family were farmers, with a long tradition in the area. His father Gustav died in 1915 while serving in World War I. Arthur and his younger brother Walter were raised by their mother, Ida. When Ida noticed young Arthur had a mechanical gift, she decided he should attend technical training. Walter inherited the family farm. From 1921 on, Rudolph attended the technical school (Note: Staatliche Fachschule für Kleineisen und Stahlwarenindustrie (State Technical School for Ironmongery and Steel Goods Industry)) in Schmalkalden for three years. In 1924 he found employment at a silver goods factory in Bremen.

== Initial work on rocket engines ==
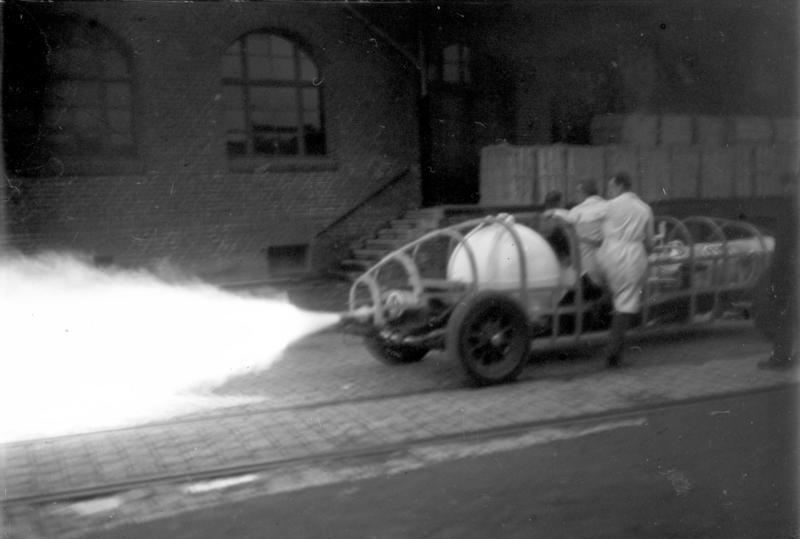
Rocket vehicle on dynamometer at Heylandt

In August 1927 Rudolph accepted a job at Stock & Co. in Berlin. After a few months, he became a toolmaker at Fritz Werner. In 1928 he attended the Technische Hochschule Berlin—now Technische Universität Berlin—graduating in 1930 with the equivalent of a Bachelor of Science degree in mechanical engineering. On May 1, 1930, Rudolph began working for the Heylandt Works in Berlin where he met rocketry pioneer Max Valier. (Note: The actual name was Aktiengesellschaft für Industrie Gas Verwertung (Corporation for Industry Gas Utilization), but was commonly referred to as the Heylandt Works. Heylandt manufactured equipment used in oxygen production and was later acquired by The Linde Group) Valier had use of the factory grounds for his experiments in rocketry and Rudolph became interested, working with Valier in his spare time along with Walter Riedel. Rudolph already had some interest in rocketry, having read Wege zur Raumschiffahrt (Ways to Spaceflight) by Hermann Oberth and having seen the 1929 film Woman in the Moon.

On May 17, an experimental engine exploded and killed Valier. Dr. Paulus Heylandt forbade further rocket research, but Rudolph continued secretly with Riedel and Alfons Pietsch. Rudolph then developed an improved and safer version of Valier's engine while Pietsch designed a rocket car. Dr. Heylandt conceded to back the project, and the "Heylandt Rocket Car" was born and was exhibited at Tempelhof Aerodrome. While it was a technical success, the fuel costs were greater than the admissions received and performances were discontinued. Rudolph joined the Nazi Party in 1931, then later the SA.

Rudolph first met Wernher von Braun when he visited a meeting of the Verein für Raumschiffahrt (VfR, the "Spaceflight Society"). In May 1932 Rudolph was laid off and looking for work when he encountered Pietsch. After forming a partnership Rudolph began design on a new engine, while Pietsch looked for a backer. Pietsch met with Walter Dornberger, who had been tasked by the German Ordnance Department to develop a rocket weapons system and had become interested in the VfR.

After demonstrating the new engine to Dornberger, Rudolph moved to the proving grounds at Kummersdorf along with Riedel, and began working under von Braun. Rudolph's engine was used in the Aggregat series of rockets. In December 1934, the von Braun team successfully launched two A-2 rockets from the island of Borkum. Static testing on the A-3 engines began in Kummersdorf in late 1936 and were observed by General Werner von Fritsch, the commander-in chief of the German Army High Command.

The Kummersdorf facilities were inadequate for continued operations, so the von Braun team was moved to Peenemünde in May 1937 where Rudolph was tasked with the building of the A-3 test stand. The Rudolphs lived in nearby Zinnowitz, where their daughter, Marianne Erika, was born on November 26, 1937. The A-3 series was plagued with guidance problems and never proved successful. In early 1938, Dornberger put Rudolph in charge of the design for the new production plant to be built at Peenemünde for the A-4 series, later renamed the V-2 (Vergeltungswaffe-Reprisal Weapon-2).

== World War II ==
In August 1943, as Rudolph was ready to begin production of the V-2, the British bombed Peenemünde. After Peenemünde was bombed, the V-2 production facility was moved to the Mittelwerk facility, which was near Nordhausen and underground.

Mittelwerk was originally a gypsum mine that was being used as a storage facility and was being excavated for production facilities. The labor force consisted of prisoners who were eventually housed at the Mittelbau-Dora concentration camp. Rudolph was in charge of moving the equipment from Peenemünde to Mittelwerk, working under Albin Sawatzki. After the plant was in place, Rudolph was operations director for V-2 missile production. Sawatzki decreed that fifty were to be produced in December. Given the labor and parts issues, Rudolph was barely able to produce four rockets that were later returned from Peenemünde as defective. There are estimates that approximately 20,000 laborers died while building the V-2 rockets at Mittelwerk, more than the V-2 killed in bombardments.

In 1944, Himmler convinced Hitler to put the V-2 project directly under SS control, and in August replaced Dornberger with SS General Hans Kammler as its director.

In January 1945 the SS ordered all of the civilians and prisoners, including Rudolph and his team, to attend a public hanging of six to twelve prisoners accused of sabotage. By March 1945, production had stopped due to a lack of parts and Rudolph and his staff were moved to Oberammergau where they met von Braun and others from Peenemünde. They finally surrendered to the U.S. Army and were transported to Garmisch.

== Recruitment into services of Allied powers and move to United States ==
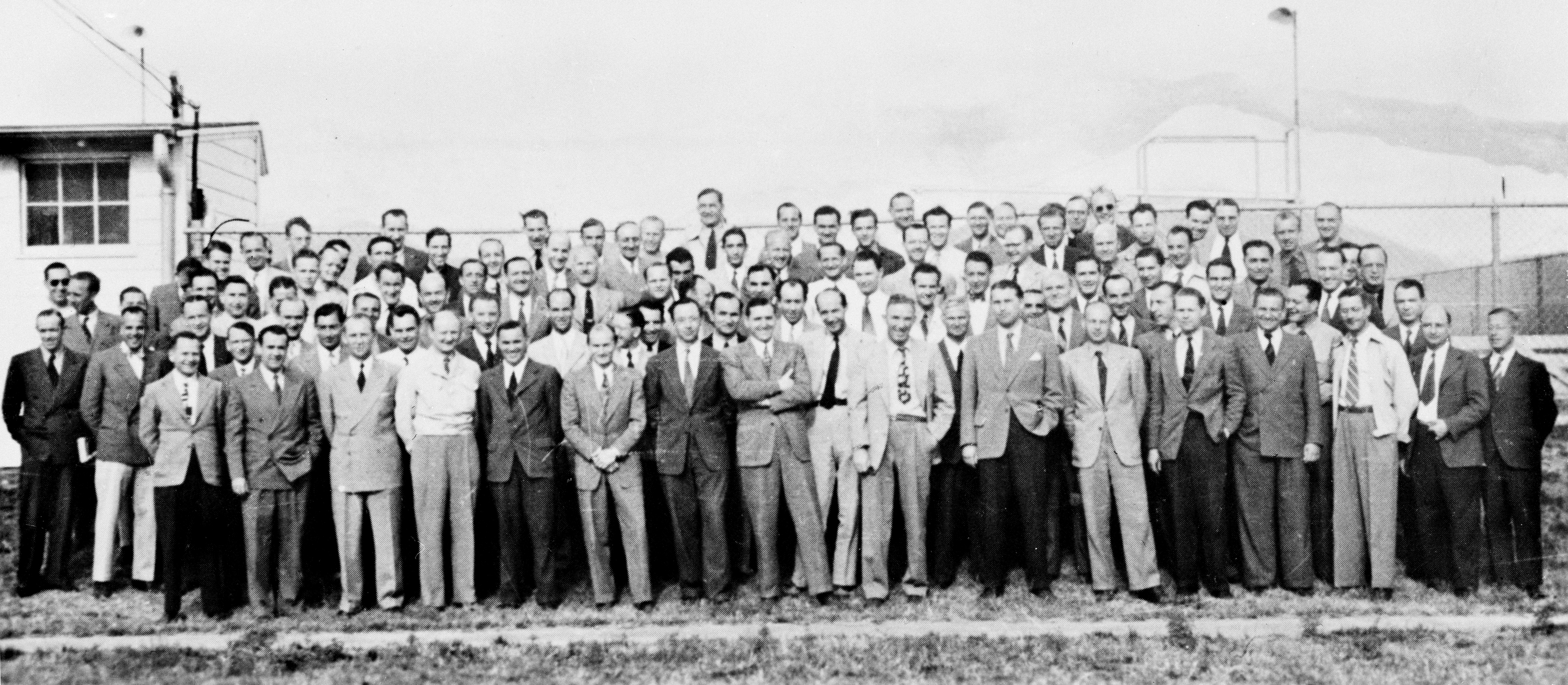
Operation Paperclip Team at Fort Bliss, Texas, August 1946. Rudolph is in the front row, fourth from the left. (pointing the mouse will show the name)

Rudolph was transferred to the British to participate in Operation Backfire from July to October 1945. He was then transferred back to the Americans. The U.S. Army picked up Martha and Marianne Rudolph from Stepfershausen before it was occupied by the Red Army and the Rudolphs were reunited at Camp Overcast near Landshut. In November 1945, Operation Overcast brought Rudolph, von Braun and the rest of the V-2 team temporarily to the US for six months. Overcast was renamed Operation Paperclip in March 1946 and formally approved by President Truman in August 1946 and most of the group stayed permanently.

After a brief interrogation at Fort Strong, the team was sent to White Sands Proving Grounds to work on further V-2 engineering in January 1946. In January 1947 Rudolph was moved to the Ordnance Research and Development Division at Fort Bliss, El Paso, Texas, where his family finally joined him in April. Since he had been brought into the US without a visa, he and others were sent to Juárez, Mexico, where he obtained a visa and officially immigrated to the U.S. on April 14, 1949. During his time at Fort Bliss, he acted as a liaison to the Solar Aircraft Company, (Note: Solar Aircraft is now Solar Turbines, a division of Caterpillar.) and spent much of 1947 and 1949 in San Diego, California.

During a 1949 inquiry by the FBI, Rudolph made the following statement on his participation in the Nazi party:

Until 1930 I sympathized with the Social Democratic party, voted for it and was a member of a Social Democratic union (Bund Techn. Agst. u. Beamt.) After 1930 the economic situation became so serious that it appeared to me to be headed for catastrophe. (I really became unemployed in 1932.) The great amount of unemployment caused the expansion of National Socialist and Communist parties. Frightened that the latter one would become the government I joined the NSDAP (a legally reg. entity) to help, I believed in the preservation of western culture.

On June 25, 1950, Rudolph was transferred to Redstone Arsenal, Huntsville, Alabama, and his group was re-designated as the Ordnance Guided Missile Center. He was naturalized as an American citizen on November 11, 1954, in Birmingham, Alabama. In 1950 Rudolph was appointed as the technical director for the Redstone missile project. Rudolph was assigned as the project manager for the Pershing missile project in 1956. He specifically selected The Martin Company as the prime contractor for the program. He also chose the Eclipse-Pioneer division of Bendix to develop the guidance system after he personally inspected the plant in Teterboro, New Jersey.

Rudolph received an honorary doctorate of science degree from Rollins College in Winter Park, Florida, on February 23, 1959. He received the Decoration for Exceptional Civilian Service, the highest Army award for civilians, for his work on Pershing.

== NASA ==
Although von Braun and his team had been transferred to NASA in 1960, Rudolph stayed with ABMA to continue critical work on Pershing. In 1961 he finally moved to NASA, once again working for von Braun. He became the assistant director of systems engineering, serving as liaison between vehicle development at Marshall Space Flight Center and the Manned Spacecraft Center in Houston. He later became the project director of the Saturn V rocket program in August 1963. He developed the requirements for the rocket system and the mission plan for the Apollo program. The first Saturn V launch lifted off from Kennedy Space Center and performed flawlessly on November 9, 1967, Rudolph's birthday. He was then assigned as the special assistant to the director of MSFC in May 1968 and subsequently retired from NASA on January 1, 1969. During his tenure he was awarded the NASA Exceptional Service Medal and the NASA Distinguished Service Medal. On July 16, 1969, the Saturn V launched Apollo 11, putting man on the Moon.

== Denaturalization and departure to West Germany ==
In 1979, Eli Rosenbaum of the Office of Special Investigations (OSI) by chance read about Rudolph in a book about moving rocket parts using forced labor. Rosenbaum had conducted research at the National Archives, about the Dora war crimes trial, appearing to connect Rudolph with the use of forced labor at Mittelwerk. In September 1982, Rudolph received a letter requesting an interview by the OSI. Rudolph believed this was one of the series of interrogations he had gone through since his arrival in the U.S. The first of three interviews, it centered on his attitudes on racial superiority, his early participation in the Nazi Party and a possible role in the treatment of prisoners at Mittelwerk.

On November 28, 1983, Rudolph, purportedly, according to his attorneys, under duress and fearful for the welfare of his wife and daughter, signed an agreement with the OSI stating that he would leave the United States and renounce his United States citizenship. Under the agreement, Rudolph would not be prosecuted, the citizenship of his wife and daughter was not in danger of revocation and Rudolph's retirement and Social Security benefits were left intact. In March 1984 Arthur and Martha Rudolph departed for West Germany where Rudolph renounced his citizenship as agreed. West Germany protested to the United States Department of State, as Rudolph now had no citizenship in any country. In July, West Germany requested documentation from the OSI to determine if Rudolph should be prosecuted or granted citizenship. The World Jewish Congress placed articles in newspapers in January 1985 on behalf of the Department of Justice, searching for survivors of the Mittelwerk.

After receiving documentation in April 1985, the case was investigated by Harald Duhn, the Attorney General of Hamburg. In March 1987, the investigation concluded after questioning a number of witnesses and determining no basis for prosecution, since the only crime which had not passed the statute of limitations was murder. Rudolph was granted West German citizenship.

Meanwhile, a great deal of controversy occurred back in the United States. Rudolph had not told his friends of the investigation, but the OSI issued a press release after his departure. Several groups and individuals were calling for an investigation into the OSI's activities regarding Rudolph. These included retired Major General John Medaris (former commander of ABMA), officials of the city of Huntsville, the American Legion and former associates at NASA. Thomas Franklin interviewed Rudolph and wrote a series of articles in the now-defunct Huntsville News that questioned the OSI investigation– these were later used as the basis for An American in Exile: The Story of Arthur Rudolph. (Note: Thomas Franklin was the nom de plume of Hugh McInnish, who wrote a weekly column for the Huntsville News. see Union Springs Herald and Introduction: The Community of Innovation and Culture of Consent in the Raketen-Stadt)

In 1985, Representative Bill Green of New York introduced a bill to strip Rudolph of the NASA Distinguished Service Medal (DSM) and re-introduced it in 1987. Rudolph applied for a visa in 1989 to attend a 20th anniversary celebration of the first Moon landing, but was denied by the State Department. In May 1990, Representative James Traficant of Ohio submitted a motion calling for hearings to determine whether the OSI was "justified in its actions or violated the rights of Arthur Rudolph." The motion failed to receive any co-sponsors and was referred to the Subcommittee on Immigration, Refugees, and International Law in June, with no further action taken.

In July the Rudolphs entered Canada for a reunion with their daughter. Since the OSI had placed Rudolph on a watch list, he was detained and left Canada of his own accord. Holocaust deniers Ernst Zündel and Paul Fromm attempted to support Rudolph with demonstrations. After Rudolph left, an immigration hearing was held in his absence; he was represented by Barbara Kulaszka, but Canadian authorities ruled that he could not return to Canada. Rudolph sued to regain his U.S. citizenship, but the case was dismissed in 1993.

In November 1996, Martha Rudolph wrote to Henry Hyde, then chairman of the House Judiciary Committee. She stated that her husband had signed the agreement after coercion and duress by the OSI and that she was dismayed by the House resolutions to strip her husband of the DSM. Rudolph continued to be defended by Pat Buchanan, Lyndon LaRouche and Friedwardt Winterberg. He was also defended by Holocaust deniers like Robert H. Countess and Martin Hollmann.

== Personal life ==
Rudolph married Martha Therese Kohls (July 5, 1905 – January 3, 1999) on October 3, 1935, in Berlin. Soon after moving back to Germany, he had a heart attack and a triple bypass. Arthur Rudolph died in Hamburg on January 1, 1996, from heart failure.

== In popular culture ==
The character of Hans Udet in the 1996 novel Voyage by Stephen Baxter is based on Rudolph. Udet is described as a senior member of von Braun's V-2 team at the Mittelwerk and as the director of the Saturn V project. Near the end of the novel Udet faces charges on war crimes, renounces his citizenship and returns to Germany.

Rudolph's name is linked to several conspiracy theories, particularly UFOs and Area 51.
