= Marksuhl =

- Ortsteil of Gerstungen
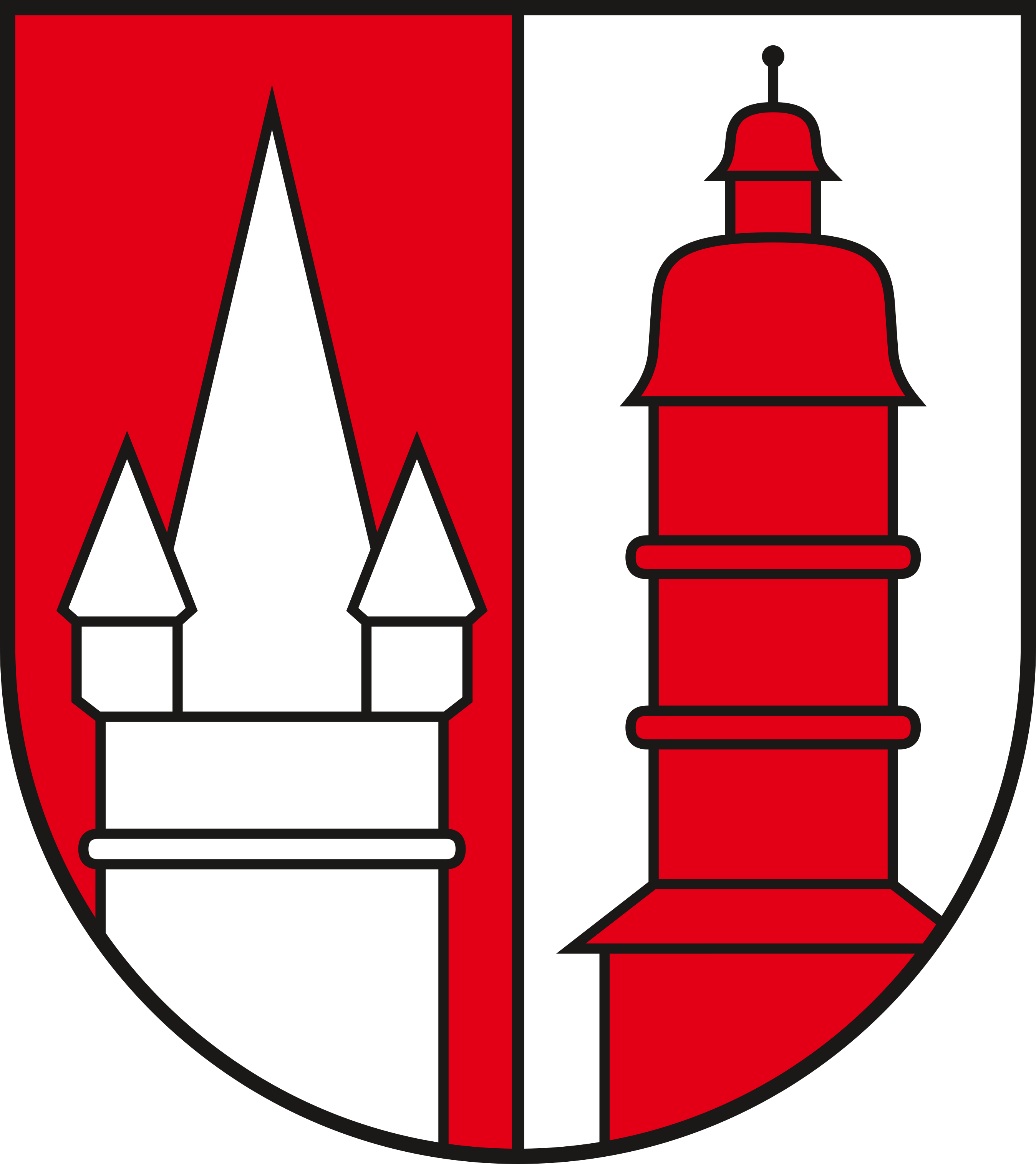
- Coat of arms
- Interactive map of Marksuhl
- Location within Germany Location within Thuringia
- Coordinates: 50°55′N 10°12′E
- Country: Germany
- State: Thuringia
- District: Wartburgkreis
- Municipality: Gerstungen

Area
  - Total: 64.98 km^{2} (25.09 sq mi)
- Elevation: 245 m (804 ft)

Population (2016-12-31)
  - Total: 2,784
  - Density: 42.84/km^{2} (111.0/sq mi)
- Time zone: UTC+01:00 (CET)
  - Summer (DST): UTC+02:00 (CEST)
- Postal codes: 99819
- Dialling codes: 036925
- Website: www.marksuhl.de

Marksuhl is a village and a former municipality in the Wartburgkreis district of Thuringia, Germany. Since July 2018, it is part of the municipality Gerstungen.

== Geography ==
Marksuhl is situated in the center of the Wartburgkreis district, approximately 15 kilometers south of Eisenach by road.

The village lies in the valley of the small river Suhl running from south-east to north-west. The landscape around Marksuhl belongs to the East Hesse Highlands, more precisely to the Salzungen Werra highlands. The boundary of the local subdistrict runs to the east on the 461 metre-high mountain Milmesberg, which is part of the aforementioned highlands and from which you can enjoy a beautiful view of the Thuringian Forest and Wartburg Castle, which sits enthroned 8 km north-east of the Milmesberg. The landscape to the south is a large wooded area, the Frauenseer Forst. There is also a lake with a floating island, the Hautsee. The municipality encompasses several other mountains.

The Suhl River and its tributaries constitute the natural water system in the subdistrict.
