= Johann Gottfried Vierling =

German organist and composer

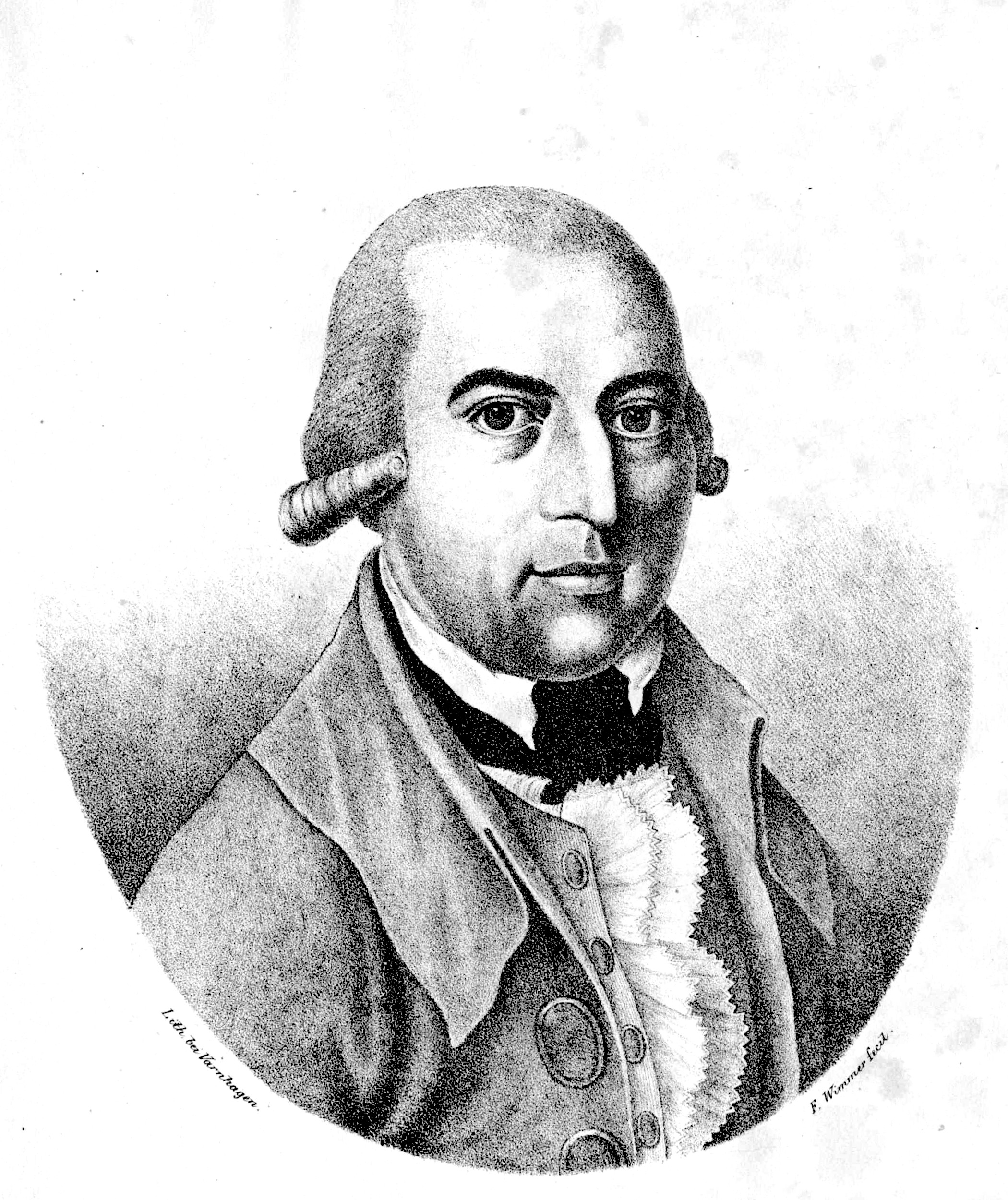
Johann Gottfried Vierling.

Johann Gottfried Vierling (January 25, 1750 – November 22, 1813) was a German organist and composer.

== Life and career ==
Vierling was born in Metzels. From 1763 he studied at the Lyzeum in Schmalkalden. In 1768 he succeeded his teacher Johann Nikolaus Tischer (1707–74) as organist in Schmalkalden. He later continued his musical studies with Carl Philipp Emanuel Bach and Johann Philipp Kirnberger. Vierling died in Schmalkalden.

Vierling composed several collections of easy organ pieces, a four-voice organ chorale book (1790) and cembalo music such as two trios, one quartet and six sonatas. Two handwritten annual volumes of Kirchenkantaten are preserved. He also published a handbook on the art of basso continuo, "Allgemein faßlicher Unterricht im Generalbaß".

Among Vierling's students was Johann Christian Friedrich Hæffner, who became a famous musician in Sweden. Through Vierling, Hæffner was a third-generation pedagogical descendant of Johann Sebastian Bach.

== Works ==
- Achtundvierzig kurze und leichte Orgelstücke
- 48 leichte Choralvorspiele, Leipzig
- Sonata in C-major for cembalo / organ
- Prelude in c-minor for organ
- About 160 cantatas
- Choralbuch auf vier Stimmen zum Gebrauch bey dem öffentlichen- und Privat-Gottesdienst : nebst e. Vorrede u. kurzen Vorbericht mit e. Haupt- u. Melodien-Register / hrsg. von Johann Gottfried Vierling, 1789
- Allgemein fasslicher Unterricht im Generalbass mit Rücksicht auf dem jetzt herrschenden Geschmack in der Composition durch treffende Beispiele erläutert, Leipzig, 1805
- Versuch einer Anleitung zum Präludiren für Ungeübtere, Leipzig, 1794
- Empfindung und Empfindelei oder Die Verwechslung der Geliebten (opera)

== Sources and further reading ==
- Höijer, J.L: Musik-Lexikon
- Klais musical scores
- Cornell university, USA
- Sorbonne university, Paris
- dolmetsch online music dictionary
