= Herda =

Herda is a surname. Notable people with the surname include:

- Dušan Herda (born 1951), Slovak footballer
- Frank A. Herda (1947-2023), United States Army soldier
- Jozef Herda (1910–1985), Czechoslovak sport wrestler
- Marian Herda (born 1933), Polish ice hockey player

== See also ==
- Hereditary equine regional dermal asthenia
