= Johann Valentin Meder =

- Born: c. 1649; Wasungen, Thuringia, Germany
- Died: 1719 (aged 69–70); Riga, Swedish Livonia
- Genres: Classical, Baroque
- Occupations: Composer; organist; singer
- Instrument: Organ

Johann Valentin Meder (baptised May 3, 1649 – July 1719) was a German composer, organist, and singer. (He is not to be confused with the German composer Johann Gabriel Meder, born in 1729 near Erfurt, and active in Amsterdam until 1800; nor is there evidence that the two men were related.)

Meder was born in Wasungen, Thuringia to a musical family with his father and four brothers all being organists or Kantors. It is rumored that he moved to Leipzig in 1666, and began his University studies in theology there in 1669. In 1670, Meder left Leipzig to pursue continued studies at the University of Jena. Unable to secure a position there at the university, he resorted to taking a post as a professional singer in the Hofkapelle of Duke Ernst der Fromme (d. 1675).

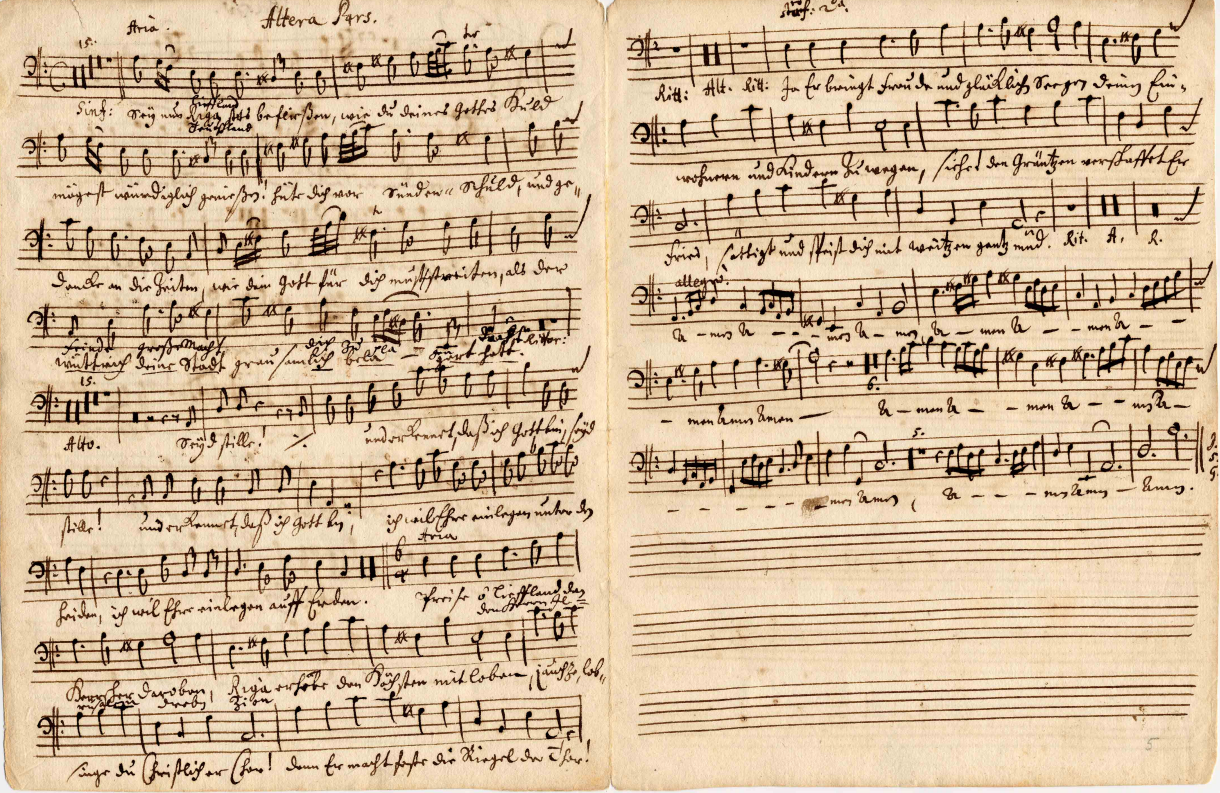
Note sheet written by Meder

He was employed as court singer at Gotha in 1671, Bremen in 1672–1673, Hamburg in 1673 and Copenhagen and Lübeck, where in 1674 he met Buxtehude, whose work influenced Meder's own sacred compositions. From 1674 to 1680 he was Kantor at the Gymnasium at Reval (now Tallinn, Estonia).

After a sojourn in Riga (now in Latvia), in 1685-1686 he succeeded Balthasar Erben as Kapellmeister at the Marienkirche in Danzig (now Gdańsk, Poland) in 1687. In 1698 the Danzig city council refused to allow a performance of his opera Die wiederverehligte Coelia. He had it performed instead in the nearby town of Schottland (now in Poland), which led to his being dismissed from his post. After being briefly employed as Kantor at the cathedral at Königsberg (now Kaliningrad, Russia), he went in 1700 back to Riga, where he served as Kantor until his death in 1719. (During this time, in 1710, Riga was taken over from Sweden by Russia in the Great Northern War.)

According to his younger contemporary Johann Mattheson's encyclopedic Grundlage einer Ehren-Pforte, Meder was an outstanding organist and singer, as well as being a composer of repute. In spite of his location in Northeast Europe, Meder was, says Mattheson, quite familiar with 17th-century Italian music, such as that of Giacomo Carissimi and Antonio Cesti, and had learned Italian in his youth. Mattheson argued that Meder would have become the music director for the Swedish Court in Stockholm had it not been for the Great Northern War, which involved Sweden, Russia, Denmark, and Saxony-Poland-Lithuania.

There are over 130 of Meder's sacred works reported in period inventories, including 37 choral works. One, a Passion oratorio from 1700, anticipates Bach by setting the words of Jesus in arioso style. We know of three operas, of which only Die beständige Argenia (performed in Reval (Tallinn), 1680) survives; lost are Die wiederverehligte Coelia (1698) and Nero (Danzig, 1695). A small number of his secular works survives. Thirteen of his compositions are preserved in the Düben collection in Uppsala.
