= Rudolf Kühnhold =

German physicist (1903–1992)

Rudolf Kühnhold (1903–1992) was an experimental physicist who is often given credit for initiating research that led to the Funkmessgerät (radio measuring device – radar) in Germany.

== Early life ==
A native of Schwallungen, Saxe-Meiningen, Kühnhold received his higher education in physics at the University of Göttingen. After graduating with a Ph.D. in physics in 1928, he took a position at the Nachrichtenmittel-Versuchsanstalt (NVA – Navy Transmissions Laboratory) of the Kriegsmarine (Germany Navy) in Kiel. There he worked in acoustical research, specifically in Unterwasser-Schall (sonar) with the objective of improving the accuracy of detection of vessels using near-surface, underwater signals. Although his efforts led to a patent, and in 1931, he was promoted to Scientific Director of the NVA, he became convinced that the desired accuracy would only be attained by using electromagnetic, rather than acoustical, techniques.

== Radar research ==
=== Background ===
The first demonstration of radio signals for detecting ships was made in 1904 by Christian Hülsmeyer, with an apparatus called the Telemobilskop (Telemobiloscope). This device, however, could neither distinguish between multiple targets nor directly measure the distance to a target, and was thus not accepted as of practical value. Other similar sets had come forth in the intervening decades, but none were successful.

=== Kühnhold’s approach ===
Kühnhold's analytical studies indicated that a very narrow beam could solve the multiple-target problem. In 1933, he obtain transmitting and receiving sets operating at 13.5 cm (2.22 GHz), both units using Barkhausen–Kurz tubes. A reflecting target was set up at 2-km distance. The transmitter produced only 0.1 watt – too small for the 4-km total path – and the experiment failed.

For further experiments, Kühnhold turned to Paul-Gunther Erbsloh and Hans-Karl von Willisen, amateur radio operators who had started a project in a narrow-beam, VHF system for secure communications. For the effort, In January 1934, Erbsloh and von Willisen, with backing from Kühnhold, formed a new company – Gesellschaft für Electroakustische und Mechanische Apparate. From the start, this firm was always called simply GEMA.

A split-anode magnetron, producing 70 W at 50 cm (600 MHz) was purchased from the Philips Research Laboratory in the Netherlands. Hans E. Hollmann and Jakob Theodor J. Schultes, both affiliated with the prestigious Heinrich Hertz Institute in Berlin, were added as consultants for developing a regenerative receiver and Yagi antennas, respectively.

The transmitting and receiving antennas were set up some distance apart. In June 1934, large vessels passing through the Kiel Harbor were detected by Doppler interference at a distance of about 2 km. The apparatus had poor reliability of detection due to frequency instability of the magnetron, a characteristic of all early split-anode devices.

=== Partnership with GEMA ===
Kühnhold worked closely with GEMA and led their attempts to improve the continuous-wave system, but also retained his position at the NVA. In October 1934, strong reflections were observed from an aircraft that happened to fly through the beam; this opened consideration of targets other than ships and brought funding from NVA.

At that time, the success of a number of researchers in using pulsed-transmission for measuring the height of the ionosphere was well known. Also, underwater acoustical detection used pulsed transmission. Thus, Kühnhold and the GEMA team turned their attention to developing a pulsed radio system for combined detection and range determination.

Their pulsed system used a new Philips magnetron with better frequency stability. It was modulated with 2 microsecond pulses at a pulse repetition frequency (PRF) of 2000 Hz. The 52 cm transmitting antenna was an array of 10 pairs of dipoles with a reflecting mesh. The wide-band regenerative circuit used Acorn triodes from RCA, and the receiving antenna had three pairs of dipoles and incorporated lobe switching. A blocking device shut the receiver input when the transmitter pulsed. For displaying the range, it had a Braun tube (a CRT), improved in the late 1920s by Manfred von Ardenne.

The equipment was placed atop a tower at a NVA test facility beside the Bay of Lübeck near Pelzerhaken. This pulse-modulated system first detected returns from woods across the bay at a range of 15 km in May 1935, but had limited success detecting a ship only a short distance out on the bay. The receiver was rebuilt, becoming a superheterodyne set, and the system then tracked vessels at up to 8-km range.

=== Demonstration ===
In September 1935, Kühnhold led a demonstration of his system given to the Commander-in-Chief of the Kriegsmarine. The equipment performance was excellent, and the apparatus was given the code name Dezimeter-Telegraphie or simply DeTe. From this time onward, GEMA had total responsibility for additional development of the system. The basic DeTe eventually evolved into the Seetakt for the Kriegsmarine and the Freya for the Luftwaffe (German Air Force); these popular sets were used throughout the war.

Kühnhold remained with the NVA and also consulted for GEMA; he is often credited in Germany as being the inventor of radar. During 1936 and 1937, in a rare cooperative activity between the services, Kühnhold and the NVA worked with Hans Plendl on Knickebein (Bent Leg) and other radio navigation systems at the Luftwaffe’s Laboratory for Aviation.

Just before the beginning of the war and for a while thereafter, some research on microwave devices was continued by Kühnhold at the NVA (in 1939 renamed Nachrichtenmittel-versuchskommando – NVK). Aside from this, little further work on microwave systems was done in Germany until after early 1943 when a British multi-cavity magnetron was found in a downed RAF bomber. A commission was formed to assess this device, but Kühnhold and Hollmann, the two scientists who likely knew more about magnetrons than anyone else in Germany, were not included.

== Post-war career ==
For the remainder of the war, most of Kühnhold's research at the NVK was in underwater acoustic techniques, working closely with the firm ELAC in Kiel. Founded in 1926, ELAC was the primary supplier of echo-sounding (sonar) equipment for the Kriegsmarine, with a staff that peaked near 5,000. When the war ended in May 1945, the NVK was closed, and ELAC was restricted to commercial audio products and reduced to a small number of employees.

In 1948, the U.S. High Commissioner for Germany relaxed restrictions on ELAC and the firm formed a Nautik Division for the design and production of nautical equipment. Kühnhold joined ELAC and initiated research in commercial radar. His work there resulted in patents, included one registered in the United States in 1954. ELAC had major financial problems, resulting in selling its Nautik Division and ending Kühnhold's professional career in the 1960s.

== Sources ==
- Kendal, Brian (2003), "An Overview of the Development and Introduction of Ground Radar to 1945", Journal of Navigation, 56 (3): 343–352, doi:10.1017/S0373463303002406
- Kummritz, H. (1988), "German radar development up to 1945", in Russell Burns (ed.), Development to 1945, Peter Peregrinus Ltd, pp. 209–226, ISBN 0-86341-139-8
- Trenkle, Fritz (1986), Die deutschen Funkmeßverfahren bis 1945, Hüthig, ISBN 3-7785-1400-8
