= Metzels =

- Ortsteil of Wasungen
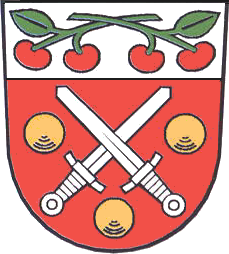
- Coat of arms
- Interactive map of Metzels
- Location within Germany Location within Thuringia
- Coordinates: 50°38′N 10°25′E
- Country: Germany
- State: Thuringia
- District: Schmalkalden-Meiningen
- Town: Wasungen

Area
  - Total: 16.18 km^{2} (6.25 sq mi)
- Elevation: 450 m (1,480 ft)

Population (2017-12-31)
  - Total: 654
  - Density: 40.4/km^{2} (105/sq mi)
- Time zone: UTC+01:00 (CET)
  - Summer (DST): UTC+02:00 (CEST)
- Postal codes: 98639
- Dialling codes: 03693
- Website: www.metzels.de

Metzels (German pronunciation: [ˈmɛtsl̩s]) is a village and a former municipality in the Schmalkalden-Meiningen district of Thuringia, Germany. Since 1 January 2019, it is part of the town Wasungen. It is located on the north-western edge of the Dolmar on a high plateau.

== History ==
The village is first found mentioned in 1228. It originally belonged to the Princely Abbey of Fulda. In the first half of the 15th Century, it was owned by the Henneberg District of Wasungen, which was located in the Franconian Circle. Then from 1680 it belonged to the Duchy of Saxe-Meiningen.

According to 16th Century folklore, a battle was fought at Metzel in 1228 during the war between the Counts of Henneberg and the High Abbey of Würzburg, in which Count Heinrich von Beichlingen and Heinrich II von Sternberg were defeated as allies of the Bishop.

Metzels was home to a case of witch-hunting a man in 1673.

In February 1945, a Halifax bomber of the Royal Air Force was shot down by a German night fighter. Parts of the machine were brought down on the territory of the municipality.

In January 2019, the municipality of Metzels was incorporated into the City of Wasungen.

== Notable people ==
- Johann Gottfried Vierling
