= Johann Nikolaus Tischer =

German composer and pedagogue

- Born: 1707; Böhlen
- Died: 3 May 1774; Schmalkalden
- Occupations: Organist, Composer

Johann Nikolaus Tischer (1707–1774) was a German organist, composer, and teacher of the Baroque and early Classical eras. He is best known for his long tenure as the town organist in Schmalkalden and for his pedagogical influence on Johann Gottfried Vierling.

== Life and education ==
Born in Böhlen, Tischer studied with several notable masters, including the violinist Johann Graf. In 1728, he was appointed as the town organist at the municipal church in Schmalkalden, a position he held for nearly fifty years. He also served as a Kammermusikus (chamber musician) to the court of Hesse-Kassel.

Tischer was an "extraordinarily versatile musician". He studied the organ with Johann Balthasar Rauche in Böhlen (1719) and violin, viola d'amore, and composition with Kapellmeister Schweitzelberg in Arnstadt. He was also a proficient oboist. Before his appointment in Schmalkalden, he served as a regimental oboist to Duke August Wilhelm of Brunswick.

In 1726, Tischer travelled to Leipzig, where he is recorded as having studied with Johann Sebastian Bach. This experience integrated him into the core of the Bach pedagogical lineage, which he later passed on to his own students in Schmalkalden, most notably Johann Gottfried Vierling.

== Works ==
Tischer was a prolific composer whose works were noted for their educational utility and "charming" character. His compositions primarily include keyboard music and suites, often written in an accessible style suited for students and amateurs.

His major published collections include:

- Anmuthige Clavier-Früchte (1740)
- Das vergnügte Ohr und der erquickte Geist (1748)
- Musikalische Zwillinge (seven volumes, 1754)
- Die vier Jahreszeiten
- Leichte und dabey angenehme Clavier-Partien (1763)

He also composed numerous violin sonatas, concertos for various instruments, and sacred vocal music.

- Divertissement Musical, Op. 1–3: Three volumes of keyboard suites.
- Anmuthige Clavier-Früchte (Graceful Keyboard Fruits): Two volumes of suites published in 1740.
- Das vergnügte Ohr und der erquickte Geist (The Delighted Ear and the Refreshed Spirit): A collection of six partitas published in 1748.
- Musikalische Zwillinge (Musical Twins): Seven volumes of concertos for keyboard.
- Die vier Jahreszeiten (The Four Seasons): A set of four keyboard suites, including Der liebliche Frühling (The Lovely Spring).
- Leichte und dabey angenehme Clavier-Partien (Easy and Pleasant Keyboard Partitas): Published in 1763.
- Wehklagendes Kyrie und frohlockendes Halleluja (Lamenting Kyrie and Rejoicing Hallelujah): Published in 1748.

== Legacy ==
Tischer's primary legacy lies in his teaching. He provided the initial musical education for Johann Gottfried Vierling, who would later succeed him as organist in Schmalkalden in 1773.

Tischer's published keyboard works were known to Carl Philipp Emanuel Bach, who used the opening measures of a minuet attributed to Tischer as the theme for his own Minuet in C Major with 5 Variations (Wq 118/3), composed in 1745.
