= Suhl (Werra) =

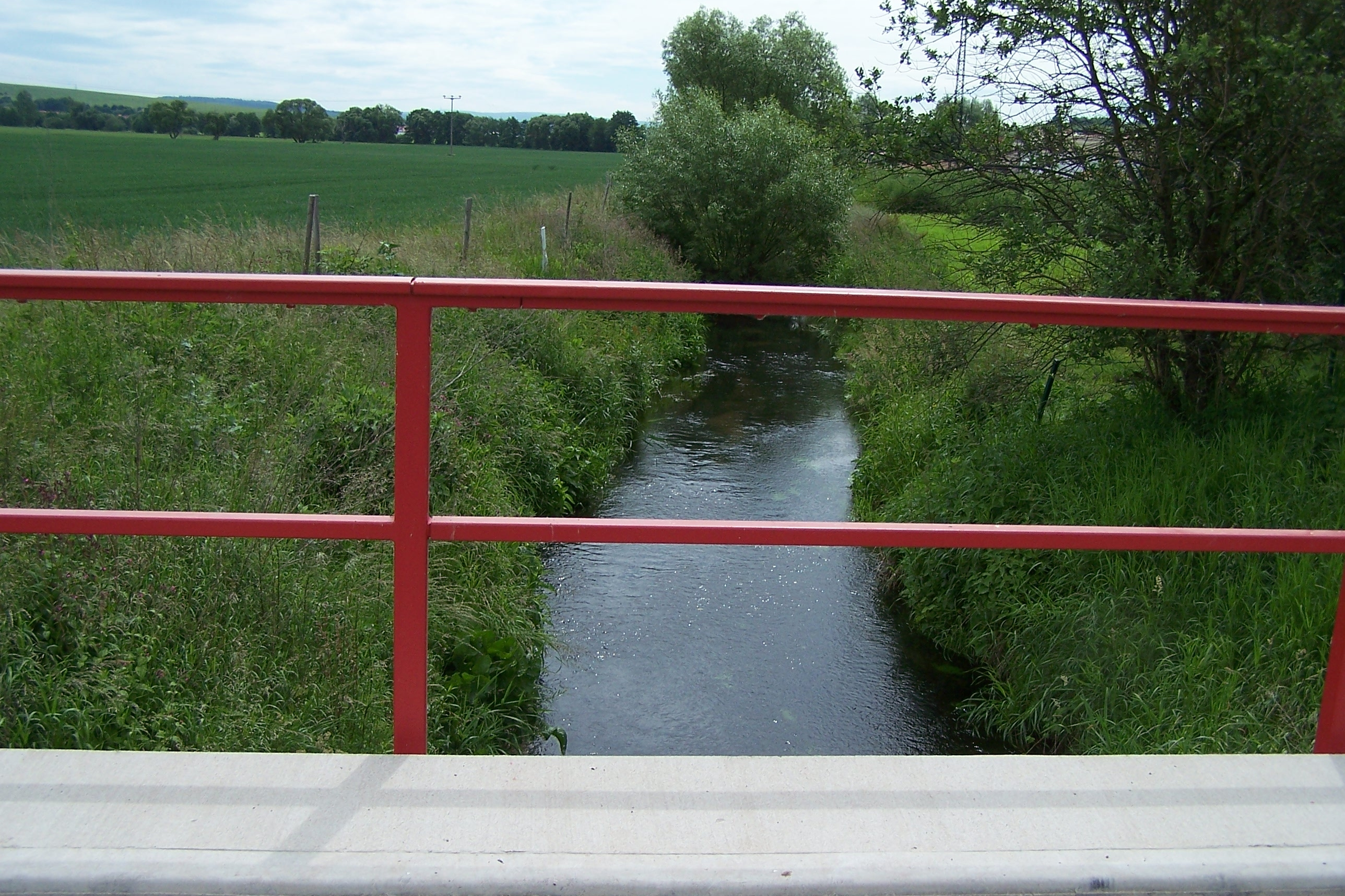

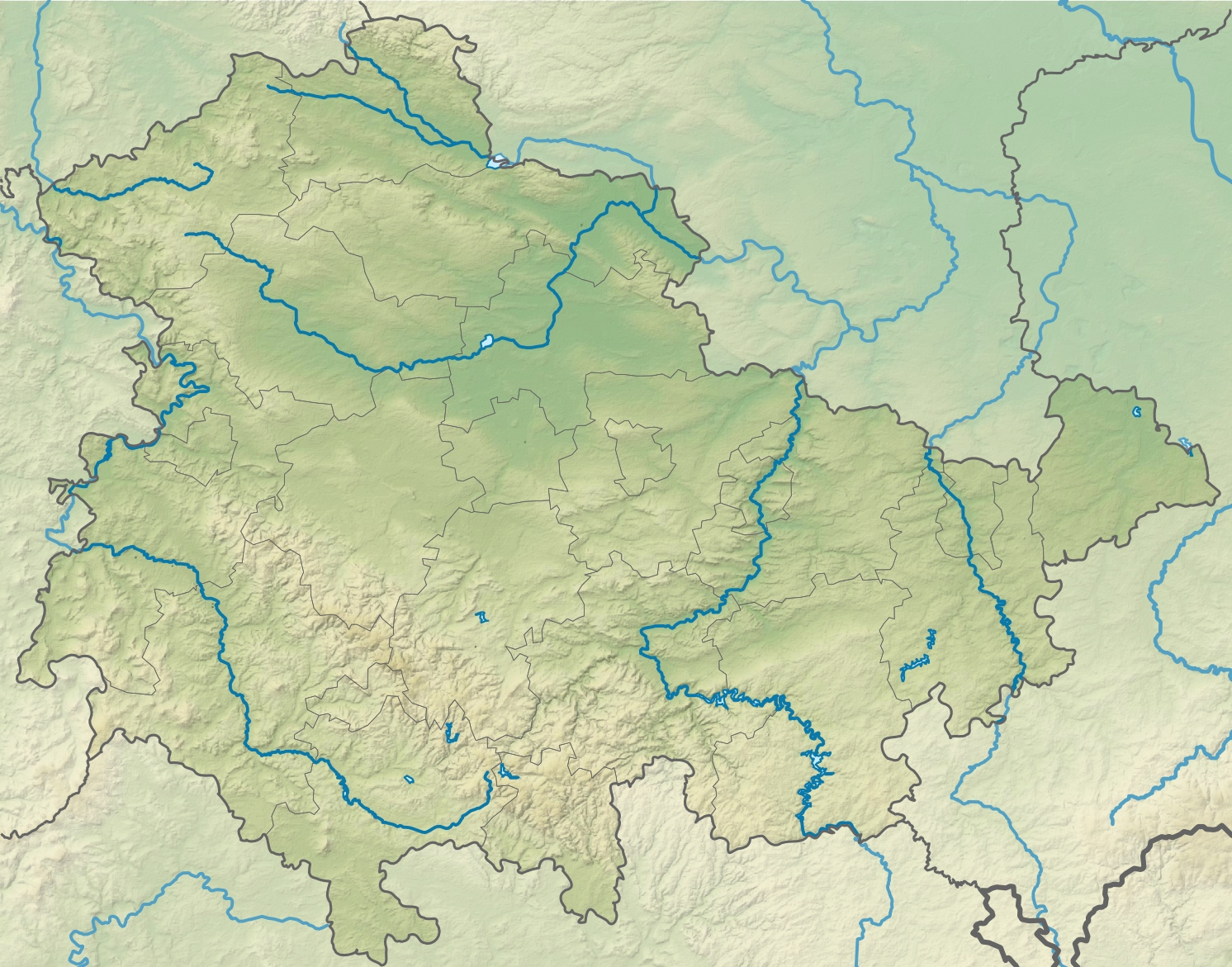
- Suhl (Thuringia)

Location
- Country: Germany
- State: Thuringia

Physical characteristics
- Source
  - elevation: 390 m (1,280 ft)
- Mouth
  - location: Werra
  - coordinates: 50.9505°N 10.0682°E
  - elevation: 208.3 m (683 ft)
- Length: 21.8 km (13.5 mi)

Basin features
- Progression: Werra→ Weser→ North Sea

Suhl (German pronunciation: [zuːl]) is a river of Thuringia, Germany. It flows into the Werra near Berka/Werra.

The river has its source in the municipality of Moorgrund, west of Etterwinden on the western slope of the Pfaffenberg. The Suhl then flows through Kupfersuhl, Ettenhausen an der Suhl, where it is crossed by the Werra railway, and the Lindigshof to Marksuhl. Between Ettenhausen and Lindigshof, the Suhl is dammed up in the Ettenhausen dam, which was built at the end of the 1980s.

Marksuhl is the largest town in the Suhl valley. West of Marksuhl follow the villages of Wünschensuhl, Fernbreitenbach, Hausbreitenbach and Herda, all districts of the Werra-Suhl valley. In Hausbreitenbach the Suhl fed a pond which surrounded the former moated castle of Breitenbach.

Below the Berka industrial estate the Suhl then flows into the Werra between Berka and Gerstungen. The last 500 metres or so of the Suhl are shown on the topographical map as the Kleine Werra, after a former branch of the Werra.

Like almost all small rivers, the Suhl has been used as mill water by the neighbouring communities since the Middle Ages.

== See also ==
- List of rivers of Thuringia
