= Ettenhausen an der Suhl =

- Stadtteil of Bad Salzungen
- Interactive map of Ettenhausen an der Suhl
- Location within Germany Location within Thuringia
- Coordinates: 50°52′50″N 10°13′53″E
- Country: Germany
- State: Thuringia
- District: Wartburgkreis
- Town: Bad Salzungen

Area
  - Total: 5.38 km^{2} (2.08 sq mi)
- Elevation: 277 m (909 ft)

Population (2016-12-31)
  - Total: 389
  - Density: 72.3/km^{2} (187/sq mi)
- Time zone: UTC+01:00 (CET)
  - Summer (DST): UTC+02:00 (CEST)
- Postal codes: 99819
- Dialling codes: 036925
- Vehicle registration: WAK

Ettenhausen an der Suhl (German pronunciation: [ɛtn̩ˈhaʊzn̩ ʔan deːɐ̯ ˈzuːl], lit. 'Ettenhausen on the Suhl') is a village and a former municipality in the Wartburgkreis district of Thuringia, Germany. Since July 2018, it is part of the town Bad Salzungen.
