= Wasungen-Amt Sand =

Municipal association in Thuringia, Germany

- Verwaltungsgemeinschaft
- Map of Schmalkalden-Meiningen highlighting Wasungen-Amt Sand
- Interactive map of Wasungen-Amt Sand
- Location within Germany Location within Thuringia
- Coordinates: 50°40′N 10°22′E
- Country: Germany
- State: Thuringia
- District: Schmalkalden-Meiningen
- Seat: Wasungen
- Subdivisions: 4 municipalities

Area
  - Total: 142.26 km^{2} (54.93 sq mi)

Population (2025-12-31)
  - Total: 8,133
  - Density: 57.17/km^{2} (148.1/sq mi)
- Time zone: UTC+01:00 (CET)
  - Summer (DST): UTC+02:00 (CEST)
- Website: www.vg-wasungen.de

Wasungen-Amt Sand is a Verwaltungsgemeinschaft ("collective municipality") in the district Schmalkalden-Meiningen, in Thuringia, Germany. The seat of the Verwaltungsgemeinschaft is in Wasungen.

The Verwaltungsgemeinschaft Wasungen-Amt Sand consists of the following municipalities:

1. Friedelshausen
2. Mehmels
3. Schwallungen
4. Wasungen
