= Aschenhausen =

- Ortsteil of Kaltennordheim
- Interactive map of Aschenhausen
- Location within Germany Location within Thuringia
- Coordinates: 50°36′N 10°11′E
- Country: Germany
- State: Thuringia
- District: Schmalkalden-Meiningen
- Town: Kaltennordheim

Area
  - Total: 3.64 km^{2} (1.41 sq mi)
- Elevation: 525 m (1,722 ft)

Population (2017-12-31)
  - Total: 136
  - Density: 37.4/km^{2} (96.8/sq mi)
- Time zone: UTC+01:00 (CET)
  - Summer (DST): UTC+02:00 (CEST)
- Postal codes: 98634
- Dialling codes: 036946

Aschenhausen (German pronunciation: [aʃn̩ˈhaʊzn̩]) is a village and a former municipality in the district Schmalkalden-Meiningen, in Thuringia, Germany. Since 1 January 2019, it is part of the town Kaltennordheim.
