= Pleß (mountain) =

Mountain in Germany

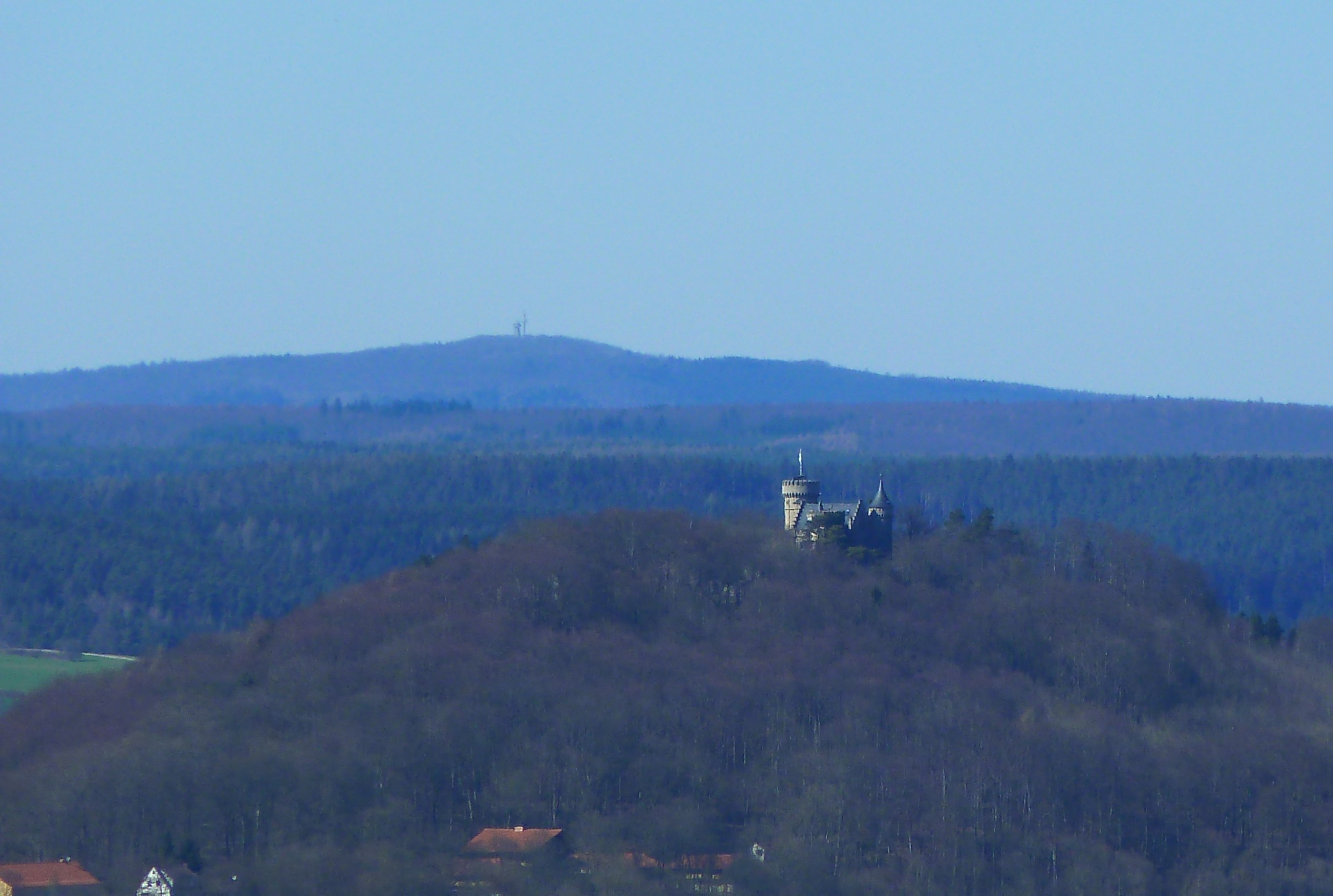
- The Pleß (rear), View from Meiningen (foreground: Landsberg Castle)

Highest point
- Elevation: 645.4 m above sea level (NHN) (2,117 ft)
- Coordinates: 50°44′38″N 10°14′31″E

Geography
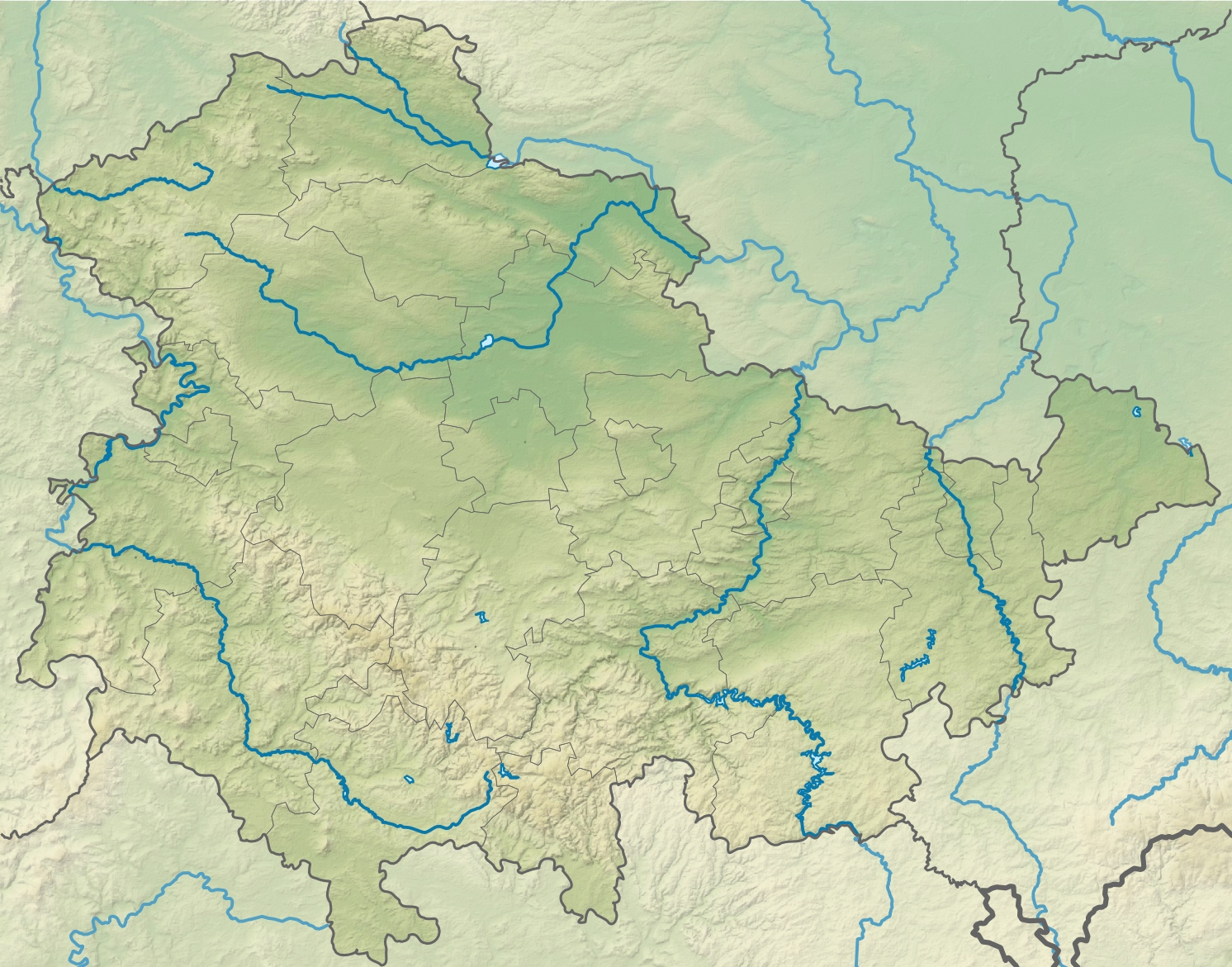
- Location within Thuringia
- Location: Schmalkalden-Meiningen, Thuringia, Germany
- Parent range: Salzungen Werra Highland commonly: Anterior Rhön

Geology
- Mountain type: extinct stratovolcano
- Rock type: basalt

The Pleß is a mountain, 645.4 m above sea level (NHN), in the county of Schmalkalden-Meiningen in the Salzungen Werra Highland in the German state of Thuringia.

== Location ==
The Pleß is generally seen as the northeasternmost mountain of the Anterior Rhön, but is counted by the Bundesanstalt für Landeskunde as part of the adjacent natural region of the Salzung Werra Upland to the northeast. The Thurigian State Office for Geology and the Environment (Thüringer Landesanstalt für Umwelt und Geologie) sees it as part of the Rhön. Geologically it was clearly formed as part of the volcanism of the Rhön, but is surrounded by the bunter sandstone of the Werra Upland.

Among the nearest municipalities are Bad Salzungen to the north. Breitungen to the east-northeast, the nearby Rosa to the south and Urnshausen to the southwest. Seen from the Thuringian Forest which is somewhat further east it is on the left (east-southeast) next to the mountains of Baier, Dietrichsberg (Dietrich) and Öchsenberg (Öchsen).

== Description ==
The Pleß is of basaltic volcanic origin.

At the summit of the Pleß is a viewing tower from which the mountains of the Thuringian Forest and the Rhön, the valley of the Werra and the castle of Wartburg can be seen.

== History ==
The original name of the Pleß was the Bleßberg. However, because there were two Bleßbergs in the Duchy of Saxe-Meiningen, an "upland" Bleßberg in the vicinity of Eisfeld and this "lowland" one - which often led to confusion – the name was changed at the behest of Duke George II at the end of the 19th century to Pleßberg. A short time later, the suffix "-berg" was dropped.

As early as the 19th century the Pleßhaus (north of the summit) and a viewing tower were built. In East Germany the mountain was declared an out-of-bounds area as part of the Bad Salzungen Training Area which extended mainly to the north of the mountain. The Pleßhaus was used as accommodation for the soldiers. Later, a barracks was built on the Pleß, but it stood empty and slowly decayed. Even the viewing tower was demolished.

Keen locals began the preservation of the Pleßhaus. The new Pleßhaus was rebuilt at the Jägerstein. The inn there bears the name Seeblick today.

Following the gradually withdrawal of the Bundeswehr during the 1990s, it became possible to walk in the area again. In March 1996 the municipality of Breitungen purchased the area of the Pleßberg and has since had its own Hausberg. In the wake of that, some time later a new observation tower was built on the Pleß.

== Gallery ==
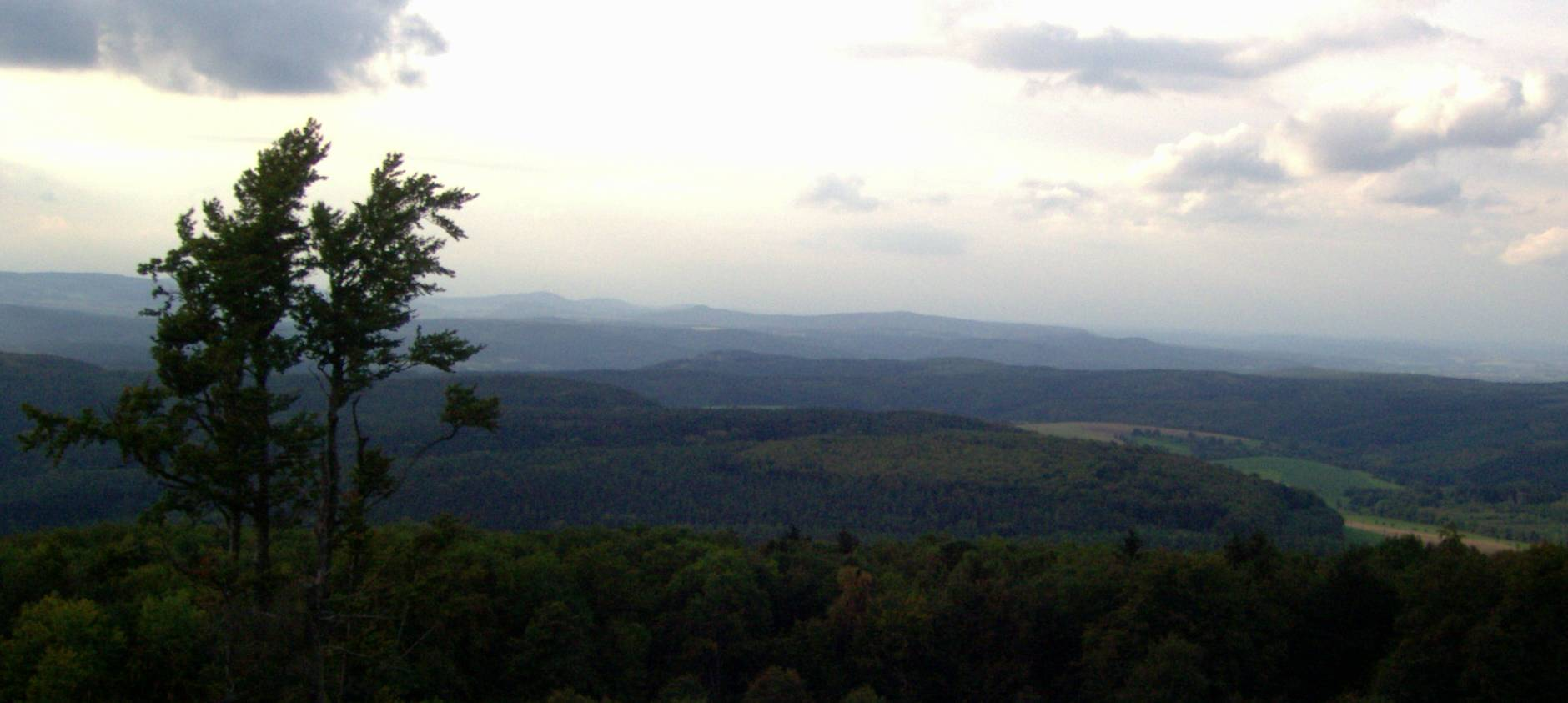
The Pleß seen from Dolmar

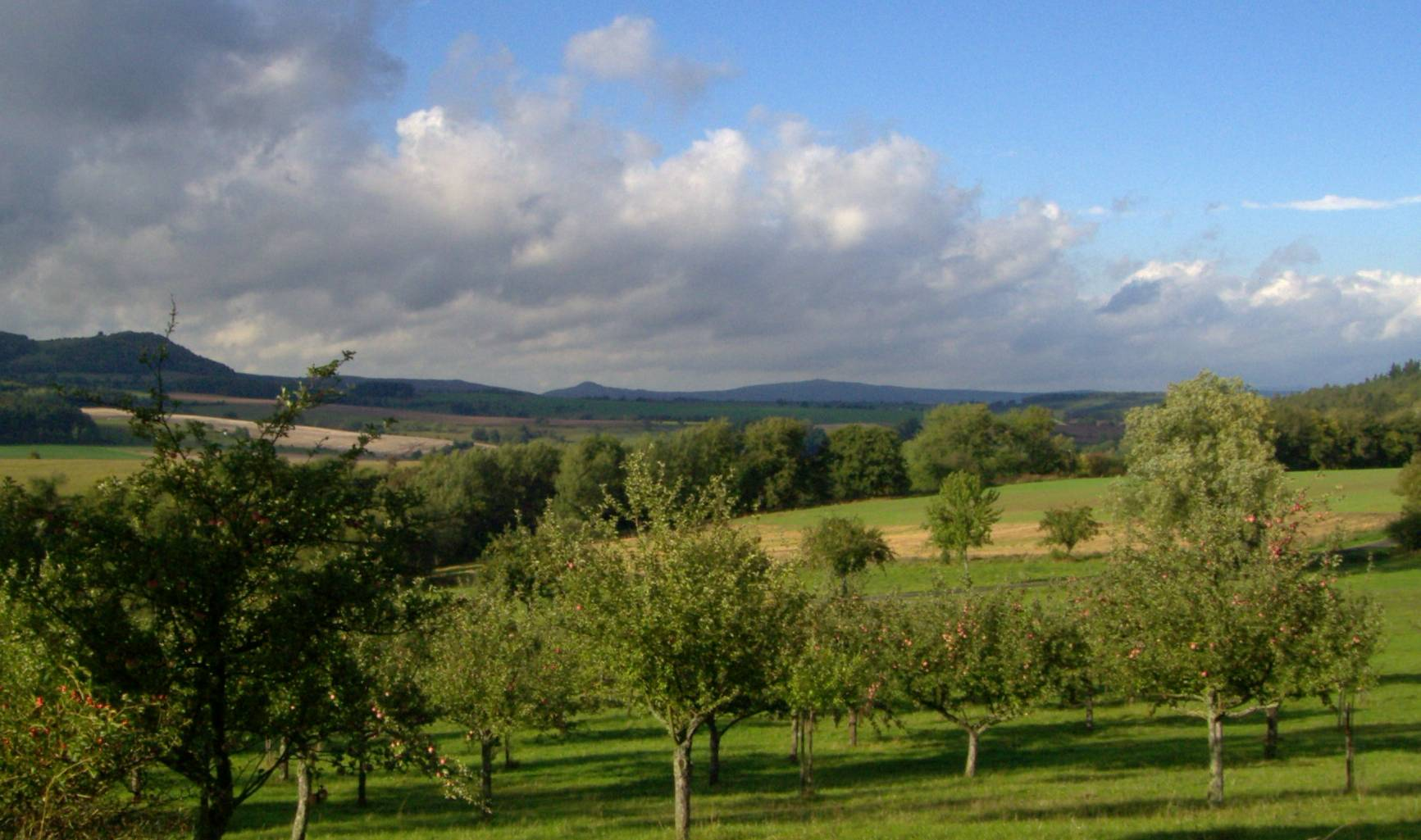
View of the Pleß and Stoffelskuppe (left) from the south

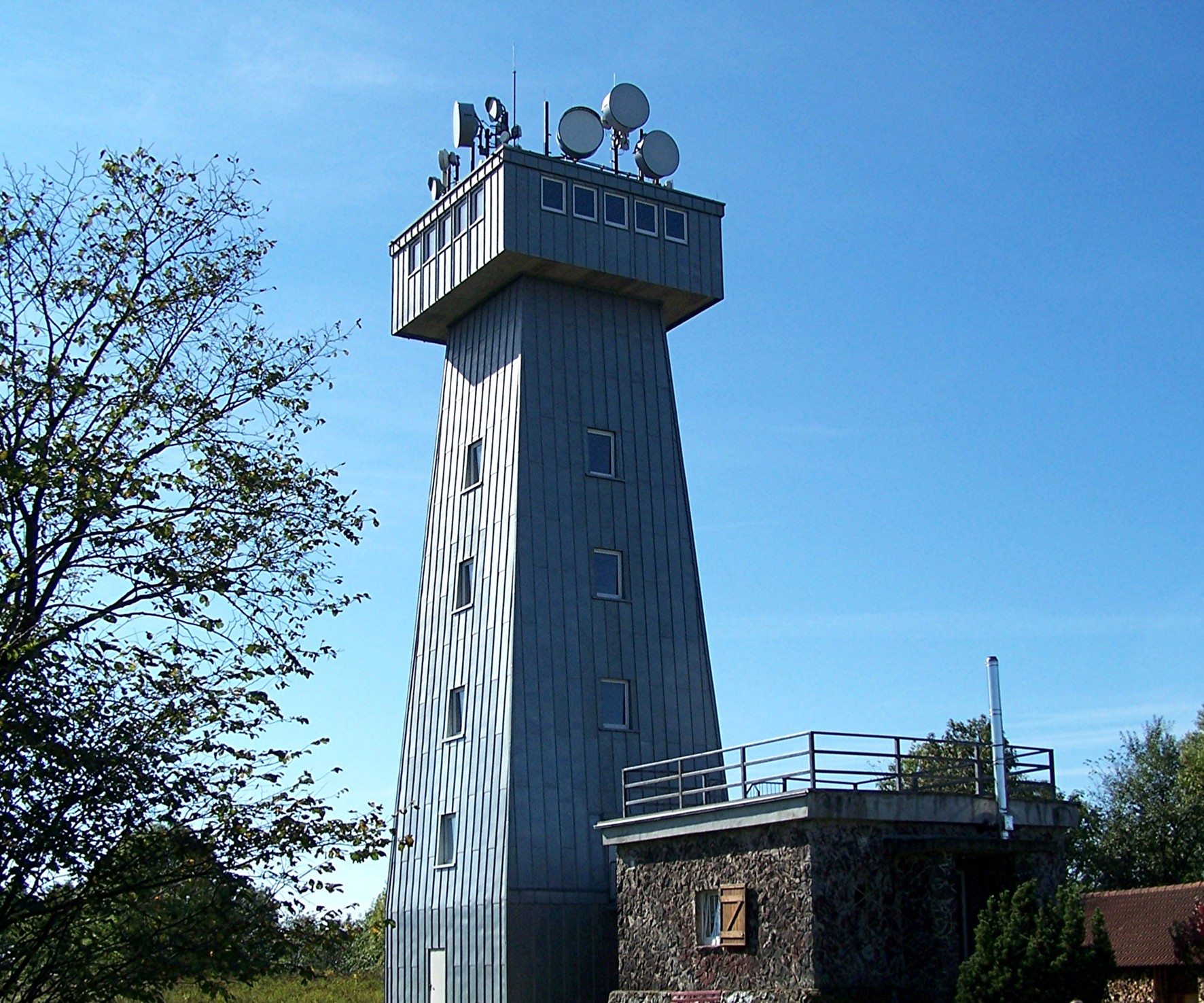
The new viewing tower on the Pleß

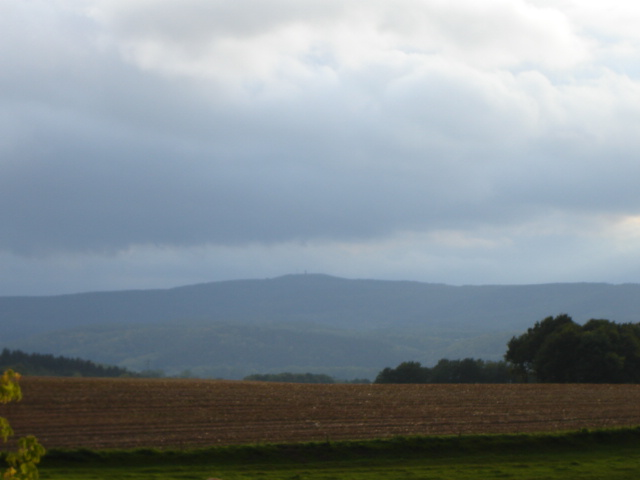
The Pleß seen from the Thuringian Forest

== See also ==
- List of mountains and hills of the Rhön
- Plešivec (German: Pleßberg) in the Czech Ore Mountains

== Maps ==
- 1:50,000 topographic map series: TK50 W Nr.55 - Westlicher Thüringer Wald, Thuringian State Department of Survey and Geoinformation, ISBN 3-86140-265-3
- 1:30,000 hiking map "grünes Herz", ISBN 3-929993-44-9
