= Marian Herda =

Polish ice hockey player

- Born: October 1, 1933 (age 92) Katowice, Poland
- Position: Left wing
- Shot: Left
- Played for: Górnik Katowice; Gwardia Katowice
- National team: Poland
- Playing career: 1948–1956

Marian Herda (1 October 1933 – 10 February 2018) was a Polish retired ice hockey player. He played for Górnik Katowice and Gwardia Katowice during a career that lasted from 1948 until 1956. He also played for the Polish national team at the 1956 Winter Olympics. In 1958 he moved to Krefeld, West Germany.
