= Wahns =

- Ortsteil of Wasungen
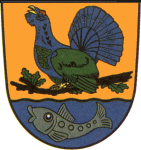
- Coat of arms
- Interactive map of Wahns
- Location within Germany Location within Thuringia
- Coordinates: 50°38′N 10°18′E
- Country: Germany
- State: Thuringia
- District: Schmalkalden-Meiningen
- Town: Wasungen

Area
  - Total: 8.01 km^{2} (3.09 sq mi)
- Elevation: 350 m (1,150 ft)

Population (2017-12-31)
  - Total: 407
  - Density: 50.8/km^{2} (132/sq mi)
- Time zone: UTC+01:00 (CET)
  - Summer (DST): UTC+02:00 (CEST)
- Postal codes: 98634
- Dialling codes: 036941

Wahns (German pronunciation: [ˈvaːns]) is a village and a former municipality in the district Schmalkalden-Meiningen, in Thuringia, Germany. Since 1 January 2019, it is part of the town Wasungen.
