= Schwarzbach (Werra) =

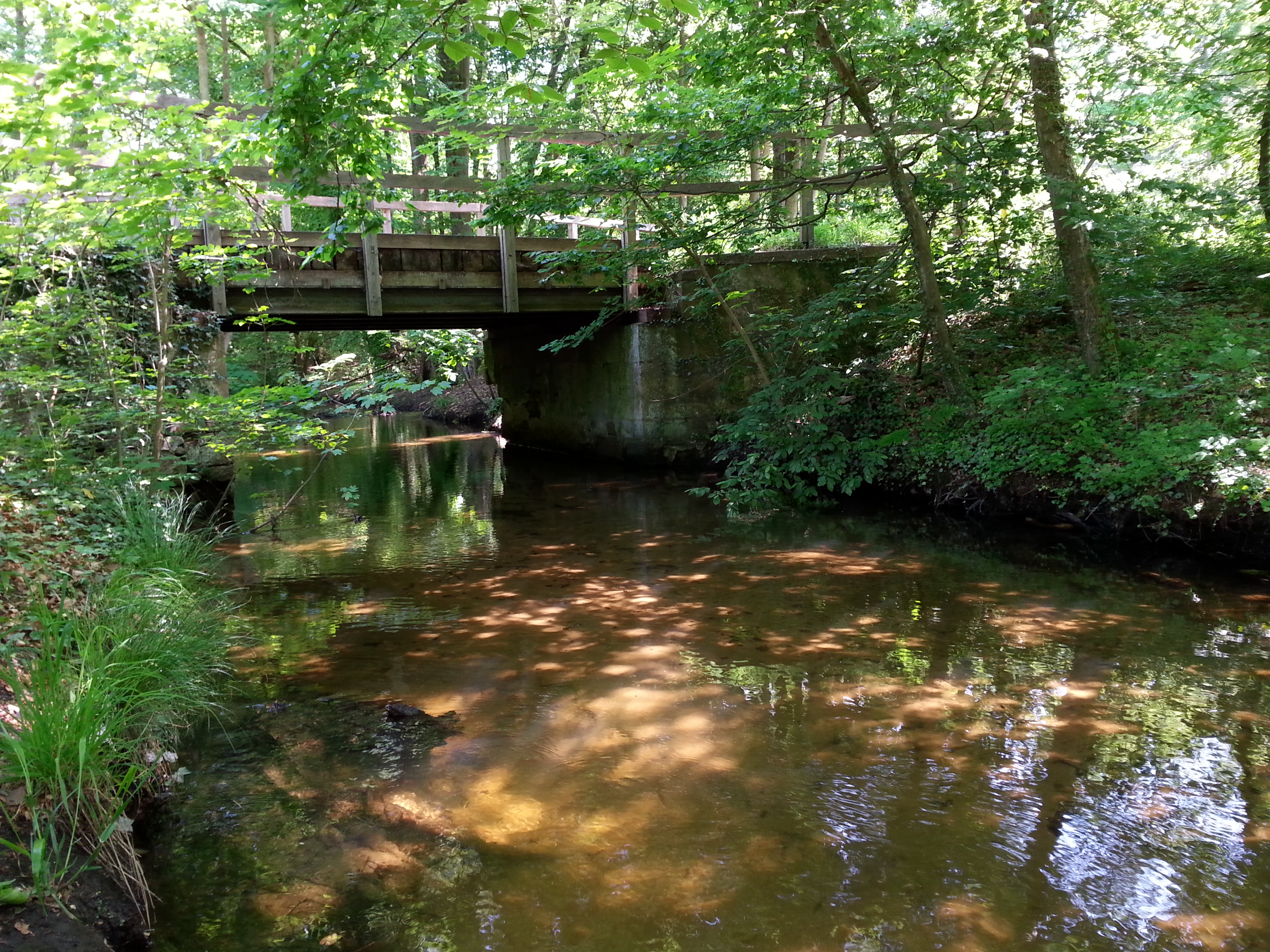
- The Schwarzbach at Mönchbruch

Location
- Country: Germany
- States: Thuringia

Physical characteristics
- Mouth
  - location: Werra
  - coordinates: 50.6762°N 10.3444°E

Basin features
- Progression: Werra→ Weser→ North Sea

Schwarzbach (German pronunciation: [ˈʃvaʁtsˌbax]) is a river of Thuringia, Germany. It is a left tributary of the Werra, which it joins near Wasungen.

== See also ==
- List of rivers of Thuringia
