= Herpf =

- Stadtteil of Meiningen
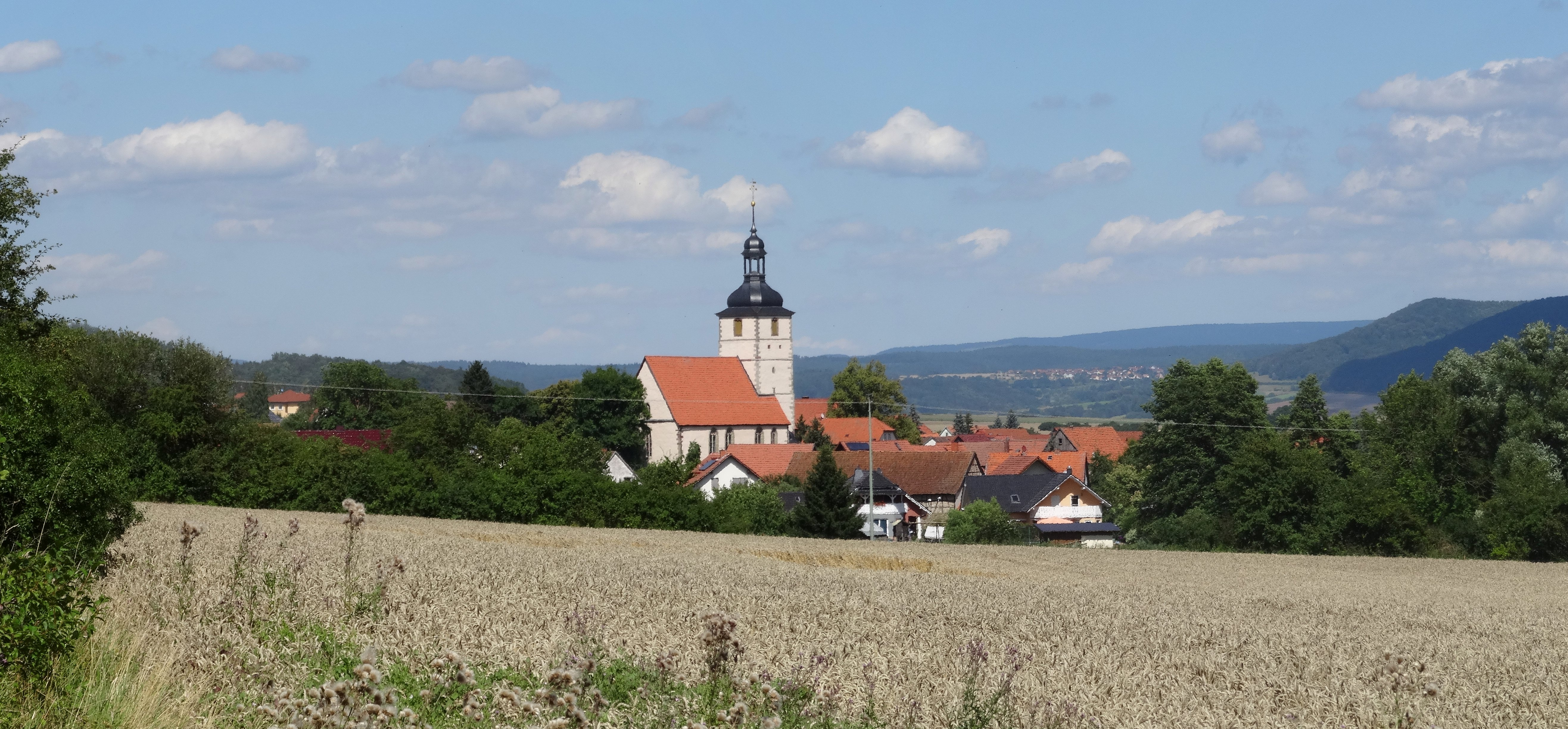
- Interactive map of Herpf
- Location within Germany Location within Thuringia
- Coordinates: 50°35′N 10°20′E
- Country: Germany
- State: Thuringia
- District: Schmalkalden-Meiningen
- Town: Meiningen

Area
  - Total: 18.08 km^{2} (6.98 sq mi)
- Elevation: 320 m (1,050 ft)

Population (2015-12-31)
  - Total: 913
  - Density: 50.5/km^{2} (131/sq mi)
- Time zone: UTC+01:00 (CET)
  - Summer (DST): UTC+02:00 (CEST)
- Postal codes: 98617
- Dialling codes: 036943

Herpf is a part (Stadtteil) of the town of Meiningen in the district Schmalkalden-Meiningen, in Thuringia, Germany. It was an independent municipality until 1 December 2010, when it was merged into Meiningen.
