= Mehmels =

- Municipality
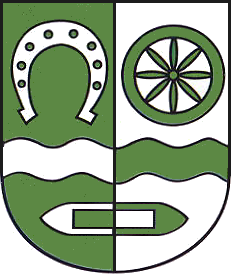
- Coat of arms

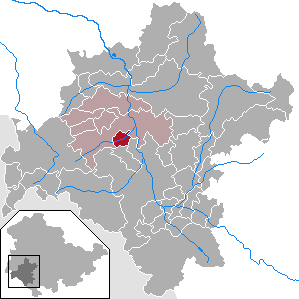
- Location of Mehmels within Schmalkalden-Meiningen district
- Interactive map of Mehmels
- Location within Germany Location within Thuringia
- Coordinates: 50°37′N 10°19′E
- Country: Germany
- State: Thuringia
- District: Schmalkalden-Meiningen
- Municipal assoc.: Wasungen-Amt Sand

Government
  - Mayor (2022–28): René Gramann

Area
  - Total: 6.46 km^{2} (2.49 sq mi)
- Elevation: 310 m (1,020 ft)

Population (2025-12-31)
  - Total: 348
  - Density: 53.9/km^{2} (140/sq mi)
- Time zone: UTC+01:00 (CET)
  - Summer (DST): UTC+02:00 (CEST)
- Postal codes: 98634
- Dialling codes: 036941
- Vehicle registration: SM
- Website: www.mehmels.de

Mehmels is a municipality in the Schmalkalden-Meiningen district of Thuringia, Germany.
