= Hümpfershausen =

- Ortsteil of Wasungen
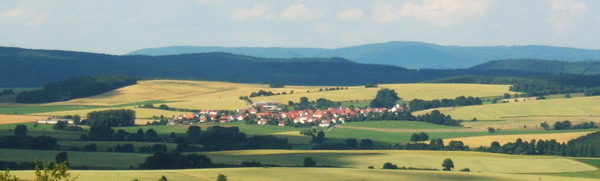
- Interactive map of Hümpfershausen
- Location within Germany Location within Thuringia
- Coordinates: 50°40′N 10°14′E
- Country: Germany
- State: Thuringia
- District: Schmalkalden-Meiningen
- Town: Wasungen

Area
  - Total: 13.3 km^{2} (5.1 sq mi)
- Elevation: 425 m (1,394 ft)

Population (2017-12-31)
  - Total: 418
  - Density: 31.4/km^{2} (81.4/sq mi)
- Time zone: UTC+01:00 (CET)
  - Summer (DST): UTC+02:00 (CEST)
- Postal codes: 98634
- Dialling codes: 036940
- Website: www.huempfershausen.de

Hümpfershausen (German pronunciation: [hʏmpfɐsˈhaʊzn̩]) is a village and a former municipality in the district Schmalkalden-Meiningen, in Thuringia, Germany. Since 1 January 2019, it is part of the town Wasungen.
