= Stepfershausen =

- Ortsteil of Meiningen
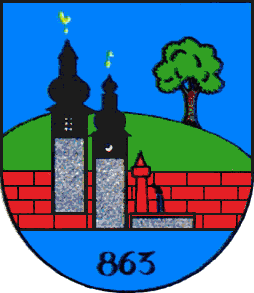
- Coat of arms
- Interactive map of Stepfershausen
- Location within Germany Location within Thuringia
- Coordinates: 50°36′N 10°18′E
- Country: Germany
- State: Thuringia
- District: Schmalkalden-Meiningen
- Town: Meiningen

Area
  - Total: 15.76 km^{2} (6.08 sq mi)
- Elevation: 430 m (1,410 ft)

Population (2018-12-31)
  - Total: 619
  - Density: 39.3/km^{2} (102/sq mi)
- Time zone: UTC+01:00 (CET)
  - Summer (DST): UTC+02:00 (CEST)
- Postal codes: 98617
- Dialling codes: 036943

Stepfershausen (German pronunciation: [ˈʃtɛpfɐsˌhaʊzn̩]) is a village and a former municipality in the district Schmalkalden-Meiningen, in Thuringia, Germany. Since December 2019, it is part of the town Meiningen.

Stepfershausen is situated to the northeast of the Gebaberg, near the Thuringian Forest and the Dolmar mountain. According to the official website of the town Meiningen, the district has around 670 inhabitants.
