= Schwallungen =

- Municipality
- Coat of arms

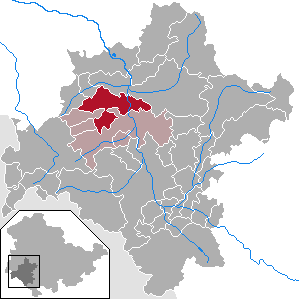
- Location of Schwallungen within Schmalkalden-Meiningen district
- Interactive map of Schwallungen
- Location within Germany Location within Thuringia
- Coordinates: 50°41′33″N 10°21′27″E
- Country: Germany
- State: Thuringia
- District: Schmalkalden-Meiningen
- Municipal assoc.: Wasungen-Amt Sand

Government
  - Mayor (2021–27): Jan Heineck (CDU)

Area
  - Total: 39.79 km^{2} (15.36 sq mi)
- Elevation: 270 m (890 ft)

Population (2025-12-31)
  - Total: 2,172
  - Density: 54.59/km^{2} (141.4/sq mi)
- Time zone: UTC+01:00 (CET)
  - Summer (DST): UTC+02:00 (CEST)
- Postal codes: 98590
- Dialling codes: 036848
- Vehicle registration: SM
- Website: www.schwallungen.de

Schwallungen (German pronunciation: [ˈʃvalʊŋən]) is a municipality in the district Schmalkalden-Meiningen, in Thuringia, Germany.

== Notable people ==
- Rudolf Kühnhold
