= Oberkatz =

Village in Germany

- Ortsteil of Kaltennordheim
- Interactive map of Oberkatz
- Location within Germany Location within Thuringia
- Coordinates: 50°36′N 10°14′E
- Country: Germany
- State: Thuringia
- District: Schmalkalden-Meiningen
- Town: Kaltennordheim

Area
  - Total: 9.11 km^{2} (3.52 sq mi)
- Elevation: 460 m (1,510 ft)

Population (2017-12-31)
  - Total: 239
  - Density: 26.2/km^{2} (67.9/sq mi)
- Time zone: UTC+01:00 (CET)
  - Summer (DST): UTC+02:00 (CEST)
- Postal codes: 98634
- Dialling codes: 036966
- Website: kaltennordheim.de

Oberkatz (German pronunciation: [ˈoːbɐkats], lit. 'Upper Katz', in contrast to "Lower Katz") is a village and a former municipality in the Schmalkalden-Meiningen district of Thuringia, Germany. Since 1 January 2019, it is part of the town Kaltennordheim.
