= Herpf (Werra) =

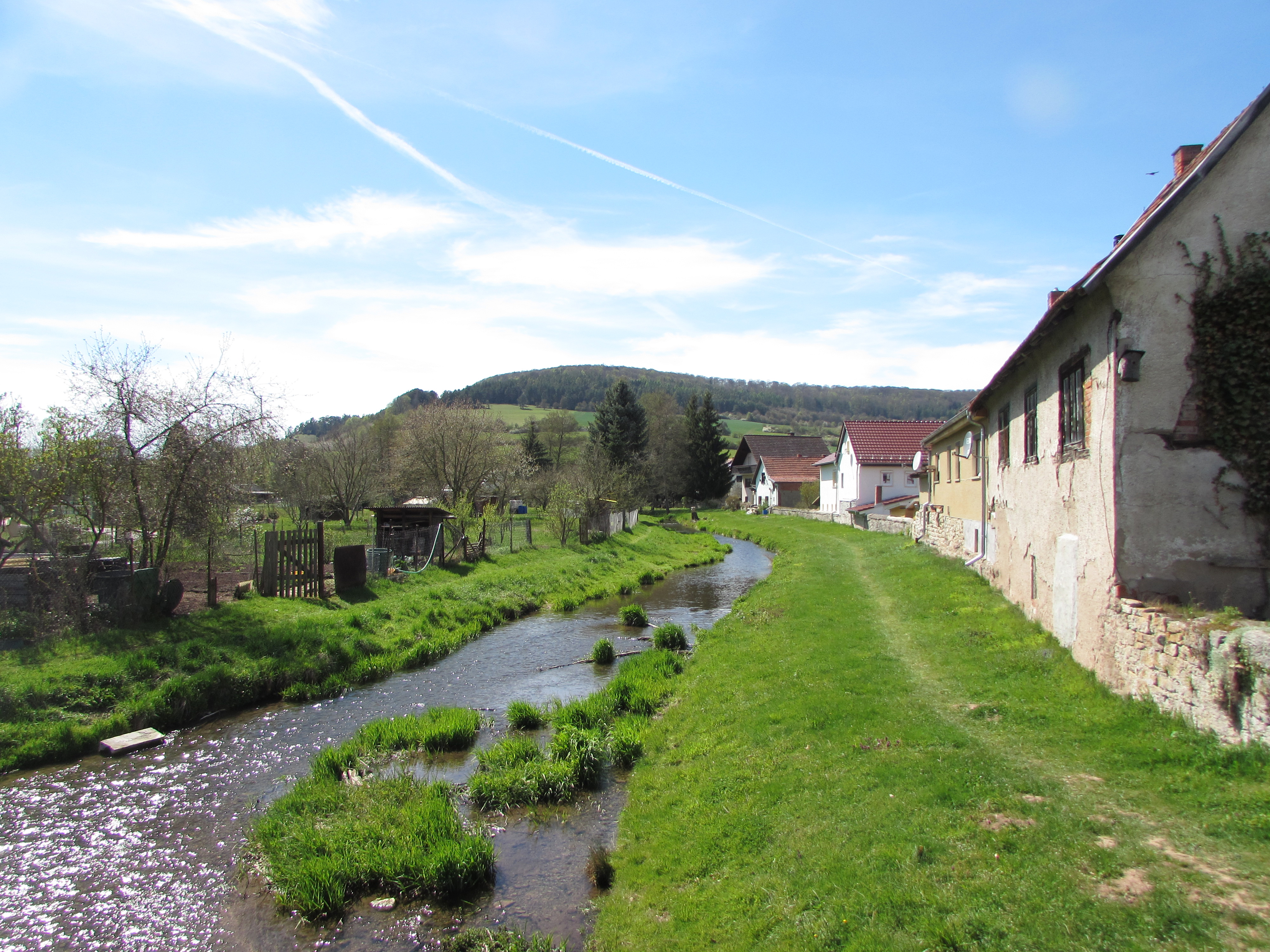

Location
- Country: Germany
- States: Thuringia

Physical characteristics
- Mouth
  - location: Werra
  - coordinates: 50°36′28″N 10°24′01″E

Basin features
- Progression: Werra→ Weser→ North Sea

Herpf is a river of Thuringia, Germany. It flows into the Werra near Walldorf.

== See also ==
- List of rivers of Thuringia
