= Unterkatz =

- Ortsteil of Wasungen
- Interactive map of Unterkatz
- Location within Germany Location within Thuringia
- Coordinates: 50°37′N 10°15′E
- Country: Germany
- State: Thuringia
- District: Schmalkalden-Meiningen
- Town: Wasungen

Area
  - Total: 9.83 km^{2} (3.80 sq mi)
- Elevation: 400 m (1,300 ft)

Population (2017-12-31)
  - Total: 359
  - Density: 36.5/km^{2} (94.6/sq mi)
- Time zone: UTC+01:00 (CET)
  - Summer (DST): UTC+02:00 (CEST)
- Postal codes: 98634
- Dialling codes: 036940

Unterkatz (German pronunciation: [ˈʊntɐkats], lit. 'Lower Katz', in contrast to "Upper Katz") is a village and a former municipality in the district Schmalkalden-Meiningen, in Thuringia, Germany. Since 1 January 2019, it is part of the town Wasungen.
