= Wasungen =

- Town
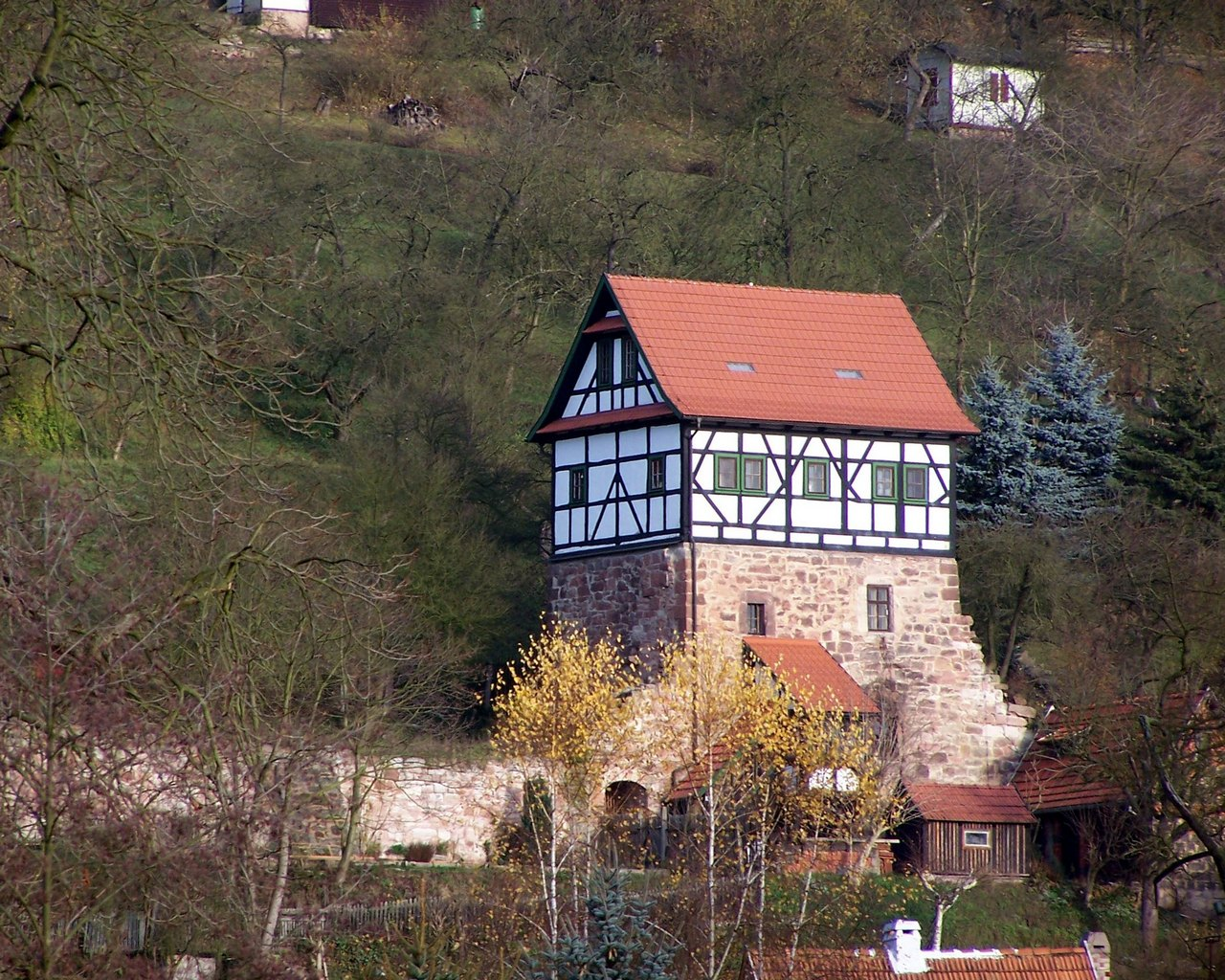
- Pfaffenburg

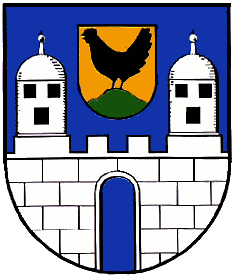
- Coat of arms

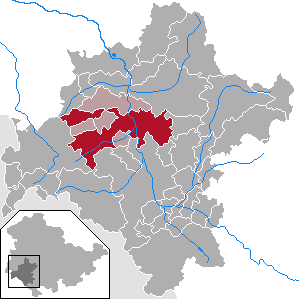
- Location of Wasungen within Schmalkalden-Meiningen district
- Interactive map of Wasungen
- Location within Germany Location within Thuringia
- Coordinates: 50°40′N 10°22′E
- Country: Germany
- State: Thuringia
- District: Schmalkalden-Meiningen
- Municipal assoc.: Wasungen-Amt Sand

Government
  - Mayor (2022–28): Thomas Kästner

Area
  - Total: 89.08 km^{2} (34.39 sq mi)
- Elevation: 270 m (890 ft)

Population (2025-12-31)
  - Total: 5,342
  - Density: 59.97/km^{2} (155.3/sq mi)
- Time zone: UTC+01:00 (CET)
  - Summer (DST): UTC+02:00 (CEST)
- Postal codes: 98634
- Dialling codes: 036941
- Vehicle registration: SM
- Website: www.wasungen.de

Wasungen (German pronunciation: [ˈvaːzʊŋən]) is a town in the Schmalkalden-Meiningen district, in Thuringia, Germany. It is situated on the river Werra, 11 km north of Meiningen. The former municipalities Hümpfershausen, Metzels, Oepfershausen, Unterkatz and Wahns were merged into Wasungen in January 2019.

The Pfaffenburg was built in 1378 and reconstructed in 1974.

== Notable people ==
- Johann Georg Liebknecht
- Johann Valentin Meder
- Melchior Vulpius
