= Oberes Feldatal =

Coordinates: 50.633°N 10.167°E

Oberes Feldatal is a former Verwaltungsgemeinschaft in the district Wartburgkreis in Thuringia, Germany. The seat of the Verwaltungsgemeinschaft was in Kaltennordheim. It was disbanded on 31 December 2013.

The Verwaltungsgemeinschaft Oberes Feldatal consisted of the following municipalities:

1. Andenhausen
2. Diedorf
3. Empfertshausen
4. Fischbach/Rhön
5. Kaltenlengsfeld
6. Kaltennordheim
7. Klings
