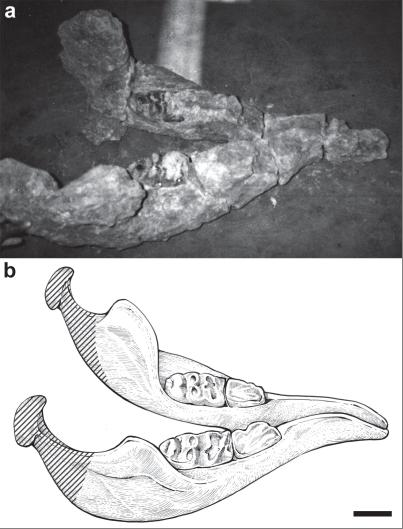
- Mandible photograph and interpretive drawing

Scientific classification
- Domain: Eukaryota
- Kingdom: Animalia
- Phylum: Chordata
- Class: Mammalia
- Order: Proboscidea
- Family: †Mammutidae
- Genus: †Sinomammut; Mothé et al., 2016
- Species: †S. tobieni

Binomial name
- †Sinomammut tobieni Mothé et al., 2016

Synonyms
- Sinomastodon intermedium GuangPu, 2007

= Sinomammut =

Sinomammut Temporal range: Miocene, 12–11 Ma

Extinct genus of mammals

Sinomammut (meaning "Chinese Mammut") is a mammutid proboscidean from the Miocene of China. Only one species, S. tobieni, is known, named in 2016.

== Discovery and naming ==
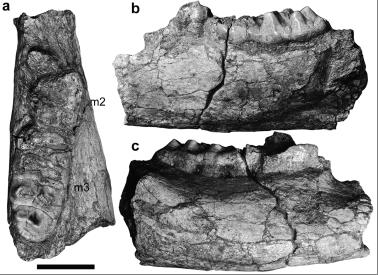
Surviving portion of GIOTC 0984-9-178, as seen from three different angles

It was known from the holotype, specimen GIOTC 0984-9-178, which was a single fragmentary mandible found in the 1990s, however, most of the specimen has been lost, leaving only the right ramus and an in-situ photograph of the mandible. The surviving ramus, known as the "Yanghecun specimen", was collected in 1999 in the Neogene-aged Xihe Linxian Basin in Miocene-aged deposits by Zhao Desi. The left branch of the jaw was lost during the salvage and is only documented by a photo of the fossil in situ.

In 2007, Xie GuangPu, also involved in the initial description, published the find under the scientific name Sinomastodon intermedium. In 2014, GIOTC 0984-9-178 was removed from the genus Sinomastodon but was not placed in another genus, for it was found to have been an indeterminate member of the monotypic Sinomastodontinae family. The type species, Sinomammut tobieni, was named and described by Mothé et al. in 2016.

== Description ==
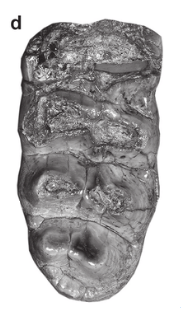
Occlusal view of the third lower molar (m3) of GIOTC 0984-9-178

Sinomammut is so far only known about a single right mandibular branch, which is only fragmentarily preserved at the ascending articular process, the joint surface is missing. It was initially believed to have been a Gomphothere similar to Sinomastodon.

The lower jaw as a whole was relatively robust, the horizontal bone body had a rounded cross-section, to the rear it widened significantly. The symphysis was narrow and long, alveoli for the mandibular tusks were not formed. In the lower jaw are still the second and the third molar. The second is completely chewed off and does not reveal any diagnostic features, but it originally consisted of three transverse groins (trilophodont). The third grinding tooth was already fully formed. It had a length of 16.7 cm and a width of 8.25 cm. On the chewing surface there were four groins. In the outline, it showed a square shape, narrowing backwards, so that the tooth on the fourth groin reached only 6.35 cm wide. Due to the dimensions, the teeth in Sinomammut were rather wide and not as narrow as in the representatives of the Gomphotheriidae as opposed to other mammutids. The chewing surface had the zygodont structure typical of mammutids. Each bar was divided into two half-strips, each consisting of a main hump at the edges of the teeth. This was followed by a smaller hump on the inside of the tooth, both humps were firmly connected to each other by a enamel strip, so that a continuous sharp edge was created. Behind the last groin of the third molar was a small cingulum, a protruding bead of tooth enamel, which at Sinomammut consisted of six small humps. The cingulum continued weakly developed along the inner and outer longitudinal side of the tooth.

Sinomammut was also shown to not have possessed lower tusks, further indicating that it was a separate genus.

== Classification ==
In 2007, Sinomammut was believed to have been a species of Sinomastodon, but further analyses have found it to belong within its own genus. According to a cladogram by Mothé et al. (2016), Sinomammut was found to be the sister taxon to Mammut. Here is their cladogram below:

- Mammutidae
  - Eozygodon
  - - Zygolophodon
    - - Sinomammut
      - Mammut

(Losodokodon, as the oldest known representative of the Mammutidae, is not taken into account here, as it is only known from maxillary teeth.)
