= Unterweid =

- Ortsteil of Kaltennordheim
- Interactive map of Unterweid
- Location within Germany Location within Thuringia
- Coordinates: 50°37′N 10°4′E
- Country: Germany
- State: Thuringia
- District: Schmalkalden-Meiningen
- Town: Kaltennordheim

Area
  - Total: 7.13 km^{2} (2.75 sq mi)
- Elevation: 440 m (1,440 ft)

Population (2017-12-31)
  - Total: 417
  - Density: 58.5/km^{2} (151/sq mi)
- Time zone: UTC+01:00 (CET)
  - Summer (DST): UTC+02:00 (CEST)
- Postal codes: 98634
- Dialling codes: 036946

Unterweid (German pronunciation: [ˈʊntɐvaɪt], lit. 'Lower Weid', in contrast to "Upper Weid") is a village and a former municipality in the district Schmalkalden-Meiningen, in Thuringia, Germany. Since 1 January 2019, it is part of the town Kaltennordheim. It is the nemesis of its neighbouring town Oberweid.

== Geographical Location ==
Unterweid is a village in the Thuringian Rhön on the border between Hesse and Thuringia. It is located on the state road 1124 with a connection to the federal road 278 to Hilders and lies in the Weidtal valley. Neighbouring villages are Oberweid to the south, the district of Kaltenwestheim to the east, Tann to the north-west and Hilders to the south-west.

== History ==
The village was first mentioned in a document on 9 June 795 (Marburg Archive). The village belonged to the Kaltennordheim office of the County of Henneberg, later to Saxe-Weimar-Eisenach (Eisenach Oberland).

Unterweid was affected by witch hunts in 1624: Margaretha Kleinpeter was caught up in a witch trial and burned to death.

On 1 January 2019, Unterweid was incorporated into the town of Kaltennordheim along with six other villages in the Hohe Rhön administrative community.

It is widely known, that Unterweid has a history of eating frogs.

== Politics ==
The Unterweid municipal council was most recently made up of six councillors. The honorary mayor Christel Bittorf-Rasch was elected on 27 June 2004 and remained in office until the village was incorporated into Kaltennordheim. She has served as the district mayor since 1 January 2019.
