= Andenhausen =

- Ortsteil of Kaltennordheim
- Coat of arms
- Interactive map of Andenhausen
- Location within Germany Location within Thuringia
- Coordinates: 50°40′7″N 10°4′33″E
- Country: Germany
- State: Thuringia
- District: Schmalkalden-Meiningen
- Town: Kaltennordheim

Area
  - Total: 1.54 km^{2} (0.59 sq mi)
- Elevation: 560 m (1,840 ft)

Population (2012-12-31)
  - Total: 204
  - Density: 132/km^{2} (343/sq mi)
- Time zone: UTC+01:00 (CET)
  - Summer (DST): UTC+02:00 (CEST)
- Postal codes: 36452
- Dialling codes: 036964

Andenhausen (German pronunciation: [andn̩ˈhaʊzn̩]) is a village and a former municipality in the Schmalkalden-Meiningen district of Thuringia, Germany. Since 31 December 2013, it is part of the town Kaltennordheim.

== Location ==
The community is located in the southern part of the Thuringian Rhön, it belongs to the Oberes Feldatal, which has its administrative headquarters in the city Kaltennordheim.

== Neighboring municipalities ==
The neighboring municipalities are Andenhausen Schleid, Brunnhartshausen, Empfertshausen and the Hessian town of Tann (Rhön).

== History ==
As early as 1185 the village was first mentioned. At that time it was fuldischer possession. From 1274 to 1583 Andenhausen Belonged to the county of Henneberg, the rulers have led the introduction of the Reformation. In the village the men appointed by the court Tann as basic and gentlemen. The Evangelical Church of Andenhausen was built in 1757, it Belonged to the parish as a branch Fischbach / Rhön.

It is with great distress the farmers had expected because of the often harsh climatic conditions, bad weather and bad harvests regularly led to famine, Andenhausen was also a center of the witch-hunt.

With the extinction of the 1583 Henneberger relax between the succession to the Saxon dukes and the Abbey of Fulda, extensive arguments over some parts of the front Rhon, who found only in 1764 to an end. In the Thirty Years' War, the Croats fell Isolanis plundering her frequently over the defenseless populations of the Rhone, which was mostly spared Andenhausen. With the extinction of the 1583 Henneberger relax between succession, the Saxon dukes and the Abbey of Fulda, extensive arguments over some part of the front Rhon, who found only in the year 1764 to an end. After the dissolution of the temporal power of Fulda in 1802, and as a result of the Congress of Vienna 1814–15, the boundaries between Thuringia, Hesse and Bavaria have been established. For the Grand Duchy of Saxe-Weimar-Eisenach were next to the former hen Berg offices Kaltennordheim and Lichtenberg also previously fuldaischen Geisa Mountain and Fish offices and the previously Hessian Ministry Vacha. For the Grand Duchy of Saxe-Weimar were next to the former hen mountain Kaltennordheim offices and Lichtenberg also previously fuldaischen Offices Fischberg and Geisa as well as the previously Hessian Ministry Vacha.

In the 1930s the Nazis also tried to gain influence in the Rhön. The Thuringia state government was charged by job-creation projects to alleviate the plight of the population. We read with great propaganda effort to create housing developments, to expand access roads and paths, stone fields and reforested woods. As has been widely visible testimony of Katzenstein built as a training home in the neighboring Empfertshausen a technical school for traditional crafts Schnitzer was built.

After World War II Andenhausen was a border town until 1989 in the restricted zone and was accessible only by permit. Ring formed around the city border fortifications. The Katzenstein was seized by the GDR government and used as a holiday home of the state.
