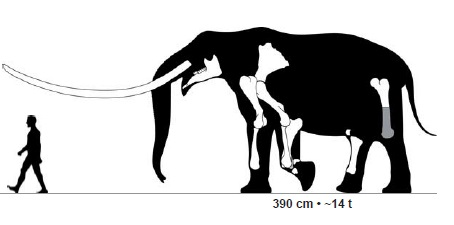
- Size comparison of a specimen from Milia, Greece, and a human

Scientific classification
- Kingdom: Animalia
- Phylum: Chordata
- Class: Mammalia
- Order: Proboscidea
- Superfamily: †Mammutoidea
- Family: †Mammutidae
- Genus: incertae sedis
- Species: †"M." borsoni

Binomial name
- †"Mammut" borsoni (Hays, 1834)

Synonyms
- Mastodon borsoni Hays, 1834; Mastodon (Trilophodon) borsoni; Zygolophodon borsoni

= "Mammut" borsoni =

"Mammut" borsoni Temporal range: Late Miocene–Early Pleistocene

Extinct species of mammutid proboscidean

"Mammut" borsoni (sometimes called Borson's mastodon) is an extinct species of mammutid proboscidean known from the Late Miocene to the beginning of the Early Pleistocene of Eurasia, spanning from western Europe to Anatolia and possibly China. As a member of Mammutidae it is related to the American mastodon (Mammut americanum), though its placement in the genus Mammut is disputed. It is the last known mammutid in Eurasia, and considerably larger than the American mastodon, with the shoulder height and body mass of males suggested to exceed 4 metres (13 ft) and 16 tonnes (35,000 lb) respectively, making it amongst the largest of all proboscideans and largest known land mammals. Its tusks, which could reach over 5 metres (16 ft) in length, are the longest known of any animal.

== Taxonomy and evolution ==
"Mammut" borsoni was first described by American naturalist Isaac Hays in 1834 as Mastodon borsoni, for a tooth discovered near Villanova d'Asti in Piedmont, Italy. It was named after professor Stefano Borson, who had originally attributed the tooth to the species Mastodon giganteum. Since its description it has been attributed to both the genera Zygolophodon and Mammut. The attribution of "M". borsoni to Mammut has been considered questionable, as the type species for Mammut, the American mastodon (Mammut americanum) is known from North America, and there is no clear evidence that there was a migration of Mammut from Eurasia to North America (a hypothesis historically favoured by some authors such as Günther Schlesinger and Heinz Tobien, and still favoured by some modern authors) or vice versa after the initial dispersal of Zygolophodon from Eurasia to North America c. 16 million years ago, with the generally accepted (though not universally so) view being that the similarities between North American Mammut and "M." borsoni are due to separate parallel evolution from Zygolophodon in Eurasia and North America, and that the lineages that gave rise to "M." borsoni and the American mastodons had been separate since the Early Miocene, which would render Mammut polyphyletic if it included "M." borsoni. Due to uncertainty about where the species should be placed, the species continues to be provisionally named "Mammut" borsoni. It has been suggested that "M." borsoni derives from the lineage of Zygolophodon turicensis. Some authors choose to segregate some late Miocene fossils into the species "Mammut" obliquelophus, which has molars essentially identical to the Pliocene "Mammut" borsoni; however, the mandibular symphysis (the fused front-most part) of the lower jaw is somewhat more elongated with larger lower tusks, and the upper tusks are probably shorter.

== Description ==
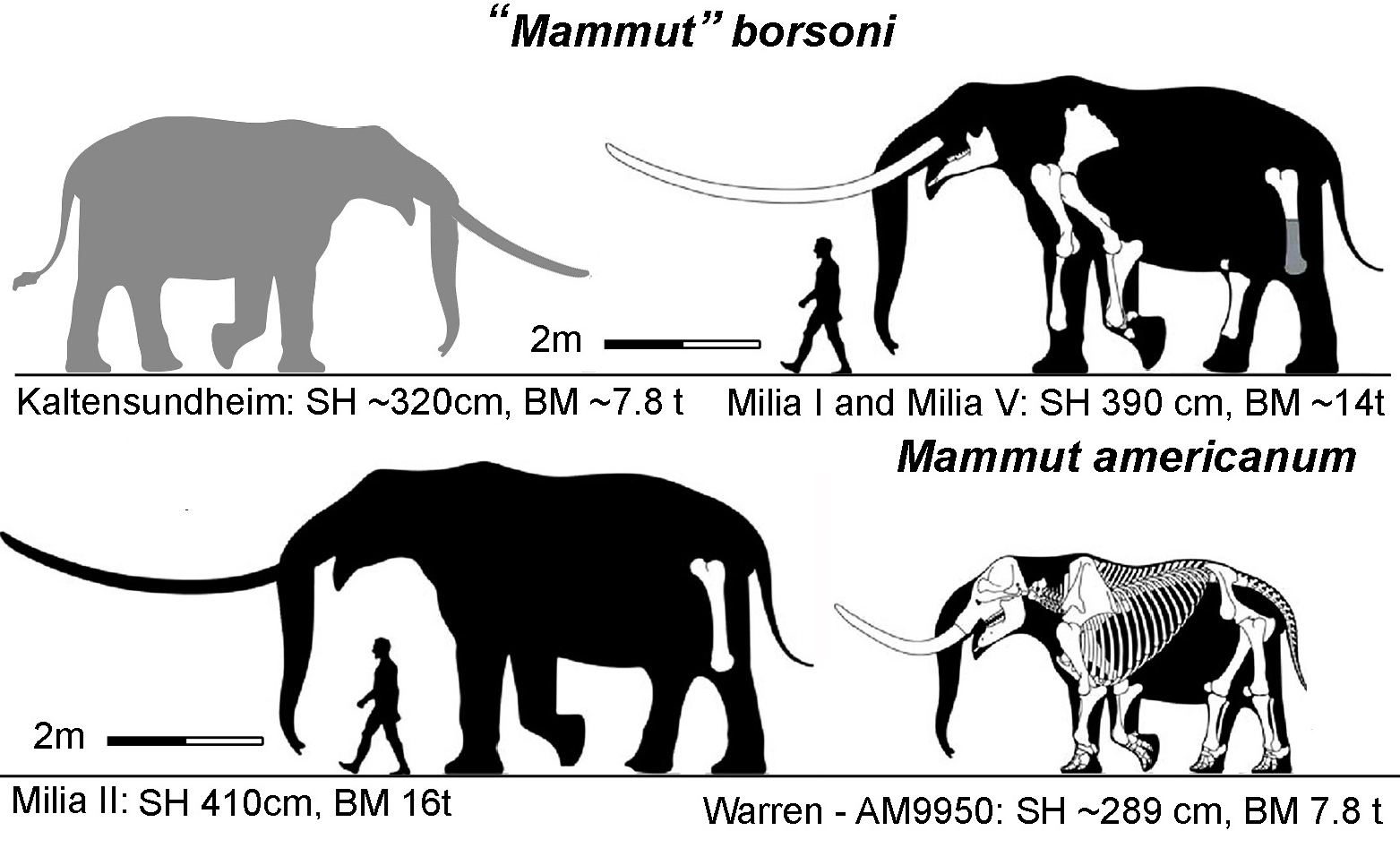
Size comparison of specimens of "Mammut" borsoni (top and bottom left), and a specimen of the American mastodon (Mammut americanum, bottom right), to 1.8 metres (5 ft 11 in) tall human figures

Like many other proboscideans including living elephants, the species is suggested to have been sexually dimorphic, with considerably larger males than females. "Mammut" borsoni is the largest known mammutid, considerably exceeding the American mastodon in size. A 2015 study estimated that some not fully grown, likely male individuals known from partial skeletons found in the vicinity of the village of Milia in northern Greece (Milia I and Milia V) weighed about 14 tonnes (31,000 lb) with a shoulder height of 3.9 metres (12.8 ft), with one specimen from the same locality known from an isolated femur (Milia II) estimated to weigh 16 tonnes (35,000 lb) with a shoulder height of 4.1 metres (13.5 ft); the latter is also estimated to have been the average size of males of the species. Both of these weight estimates are significantly larger than those of any known modern elephant, placing it among the largest land mammals to have ever lived, rivalling Paraceratherium transouralicum in size. A fully grown specimen, suggested to be female due to its size, known from a partial skeleton excavated from a sinkhole near the village of Kaltensundheim, in Thuringia, central Germany in 1958 had a shoulder height of 3.2 metres (10.5 ft) and an estimated body mass of 7.8 tonnes (17,000 lb).

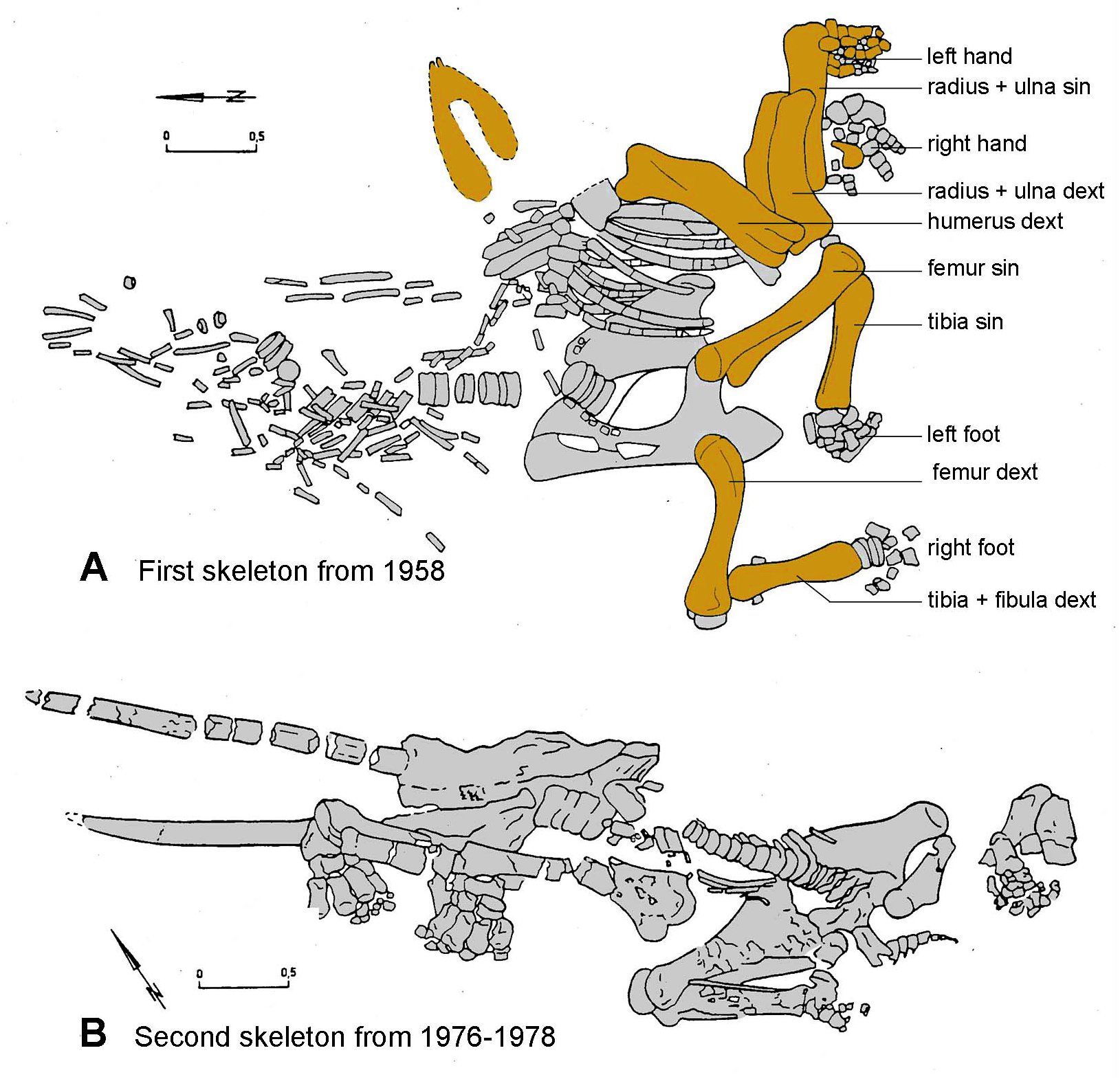
Excavation sketches of two "Mammut" borsoni specimens from Kaltensundheim. A: a 3.2 metre tall probable female excavated in 1958, with gold showing bones whose whereabouts are known. B: An undescribed specimen excavated in 1976-78

The upper tusks lack enamel bands (which are present in the tusks of Zygolophodon turicensis), are straight to slightly upwardly curved, and the longest known amongst proboscideans, with one preserved tusk from a probably male specimen from Milia measuring 5.02 metres (16.5 ft) in length, with an estimated mass in life of around 137 kilograms (302 lb). Females are suggested to have probably had smaller tusks than males, similar to modern elephants. In comparison to earlier mammutids like Zygolophodon, the lower jaw, particularly the front-most part, the mandibular symphysis, is relatively short, but at least in some individuals still bears small lower tusks (around 5 centimetres (2.0 in) in diameter and 15 centimetres (5.9 in) in length in the Kaltensundheim specimen), though some "M. " borsoni individuals appear to have had tuskless lower jaws. The jaws appear to have lacked permanent premolar teeth, which are present in more primitive mammutids.

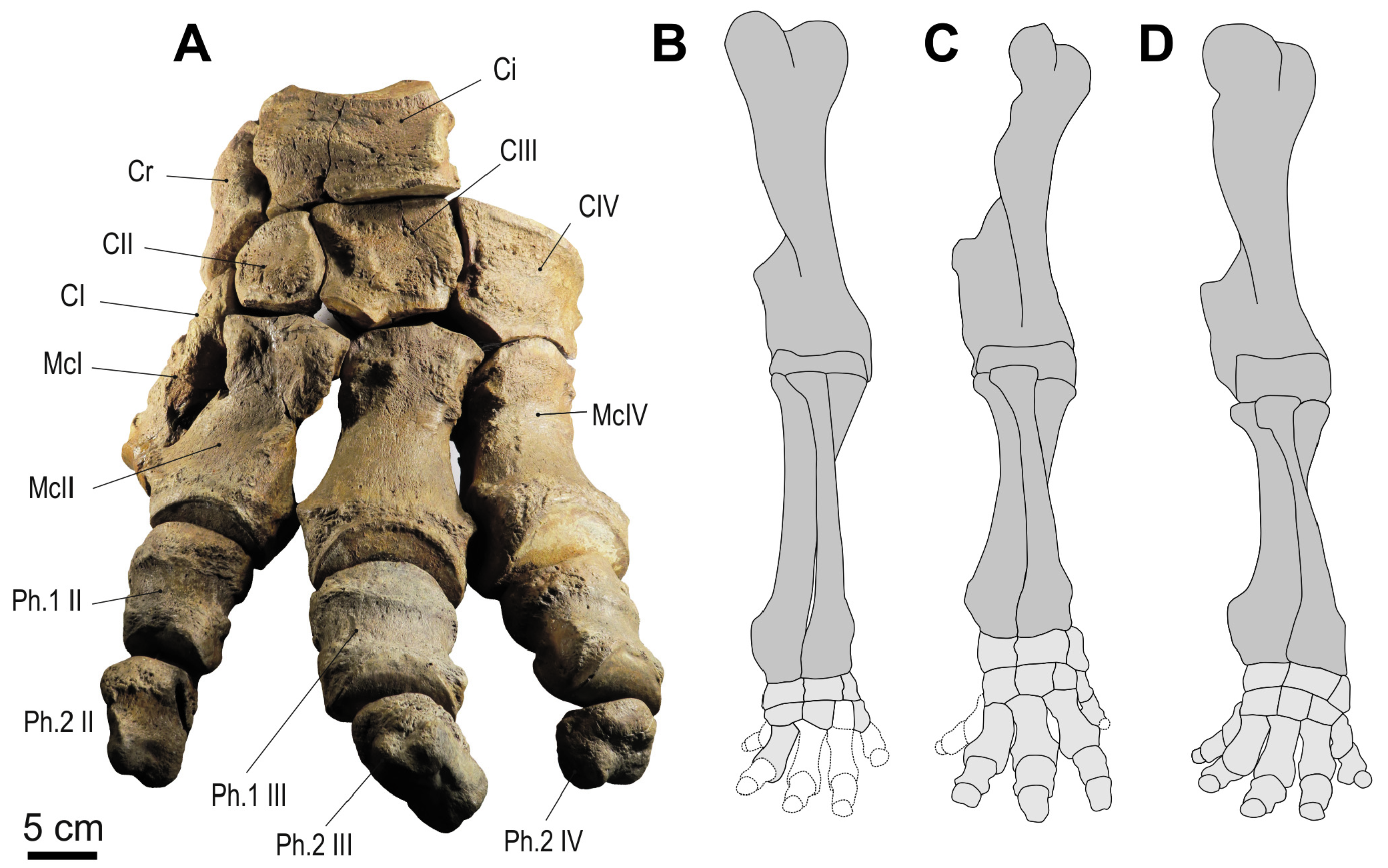
Front foot of the Kaltensundheim specimen (A, left), and a comparison of the forelimb structure of "Mammut" borsoni (C), with Zygolophodon turicensis (B) and the American mastodon Mammut americanum (D)

The anatomy of the ulna, radius, femur, and foot bones of "Mammut" borsoni are more morphologically similar to those of the American mastodon (Mammut americanum) than to Zygolophodon turicensis, though the converse is true for the humerus and tibia, with the morphology of the limb bones being more gracile/less robust than those of the American mastodon. The humerus has a distinctly convex outline in medial view (when viewed from the inner side respective to life position), with the shaft being triangular shaped in cross section. The olecranon process of the ulna where it articulates with the elbow is very robust and projects out to the side (laterally). The intercondylar fossa of the femur is narrower in "M." borsoni than in the American mastodon and more similar to Z. turicensis. The condylus medialis of the tibia where connects to the knee joint with the femur is large. The fibula shaft is relatively thin.

A braincase of the species known from Moldova, which shows that the shape of the endocast (the internal hollow space occupied by the brain) differs somewhat from its counterpart in the American mastodon, with the location of the temporal lobe being prominently developed, and the location of the front tips of the olfactory bulbs being clearly visible, while the tips of the olfactory bulbs are less prominent and often not visible in American mastodon endocasts. Like other mammutids, the encephalization quotient is lower than for modern elephants, indicating a proportionally smaller brain relative to body mass, with the brain of the Moldovan specimen estimated to have weighed approximately 4.7 kilograms (10 lb).

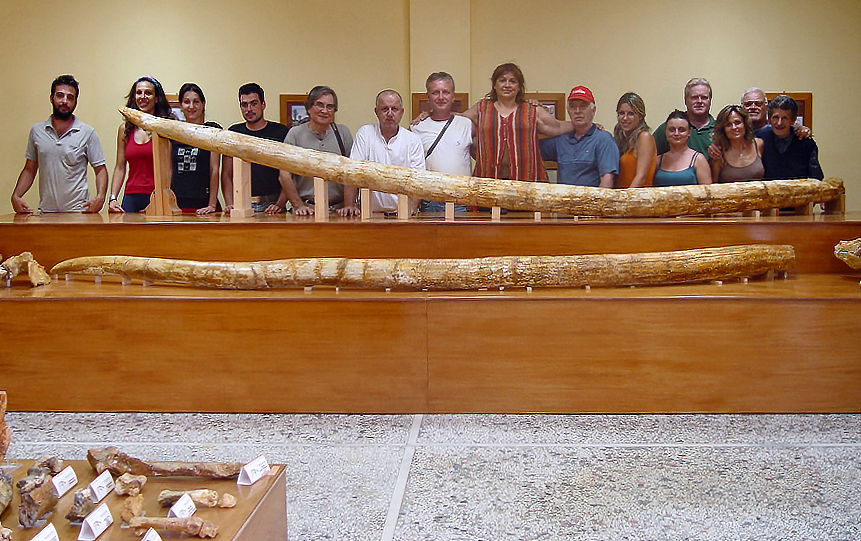
Tusks of "M." borsoni from Milia, Greece, which are the longest tusks ever found

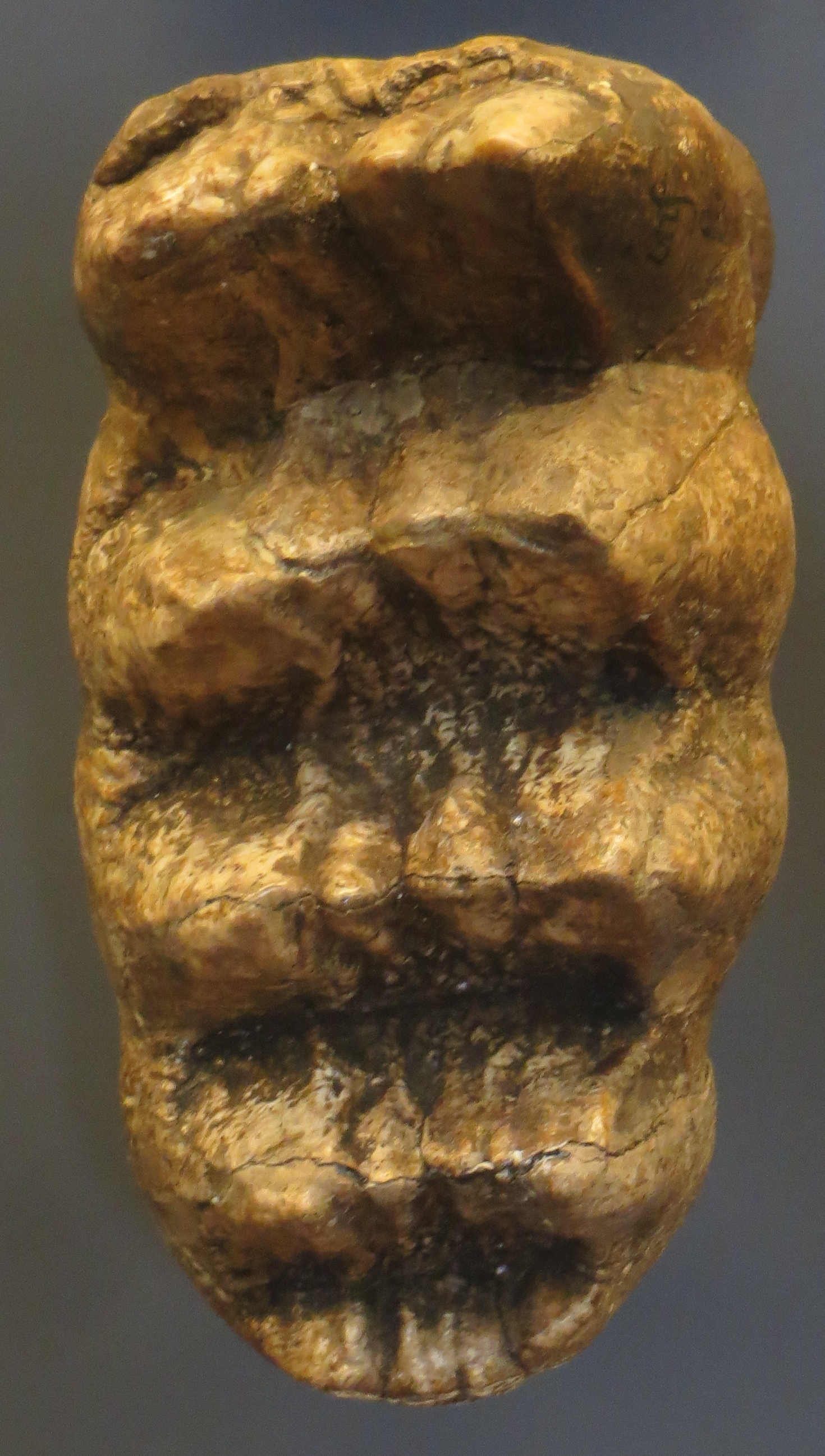
Molar tooth

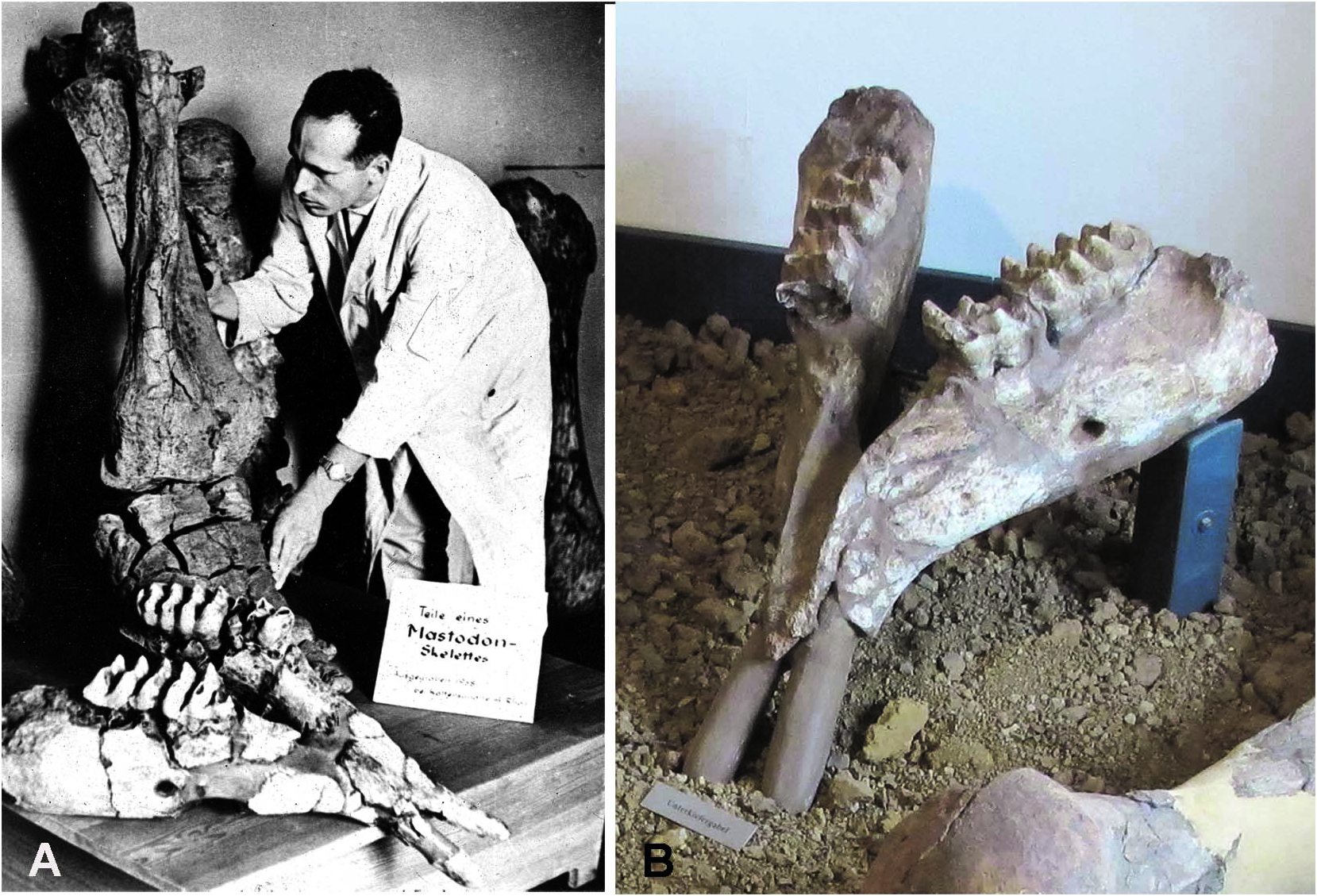
Tusked lower jaw of the Kaltensundheim specimen of "M." borsoni in an archive historical photo with real tusks (left) and a modern photo of the partially restored jaw with replica lower tusks (right)

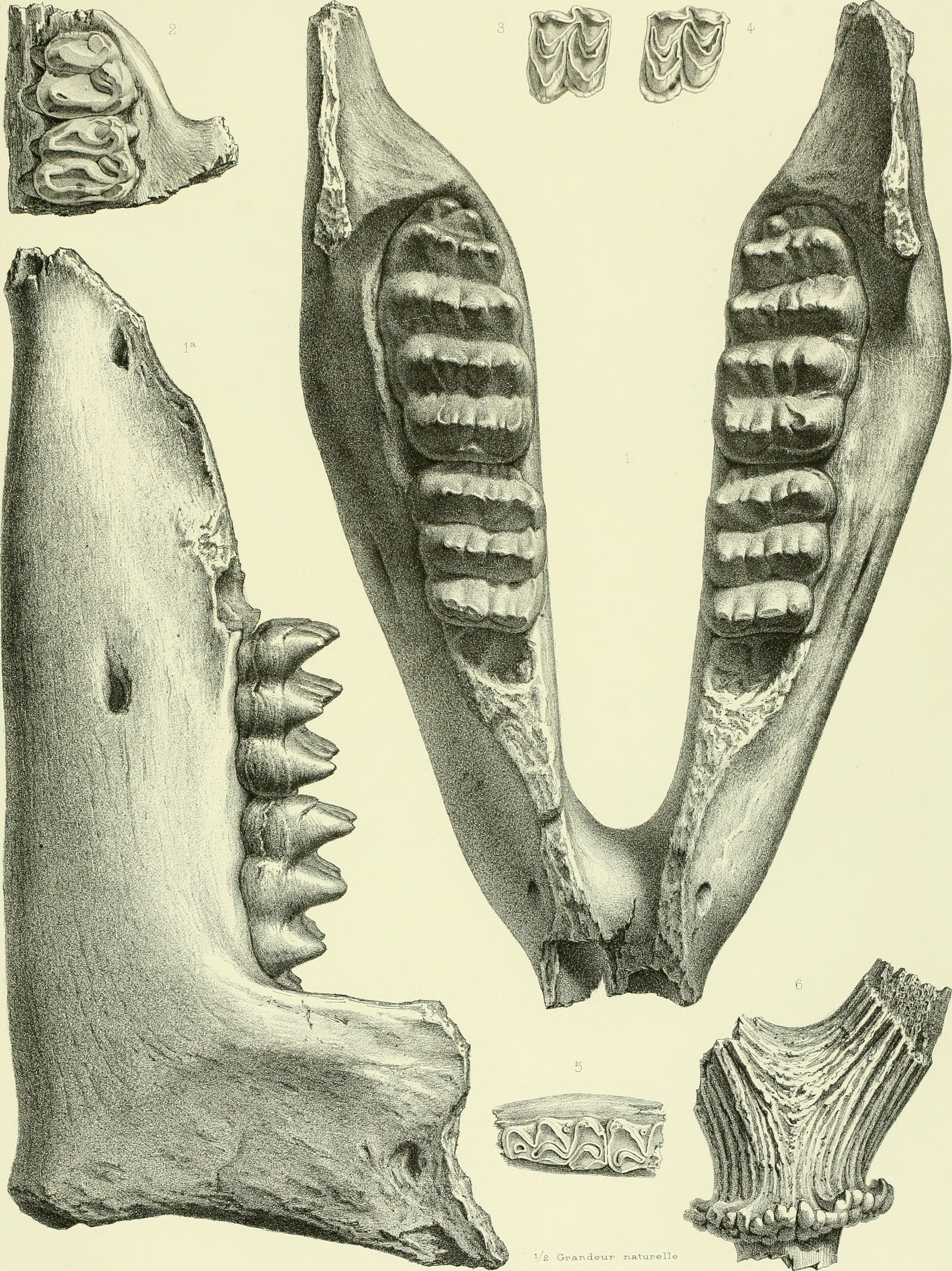
Lithograph of a partial lower jaw of "Mammut" borsoni, alongside other miscellaneous mammal remains

== Ecology ==
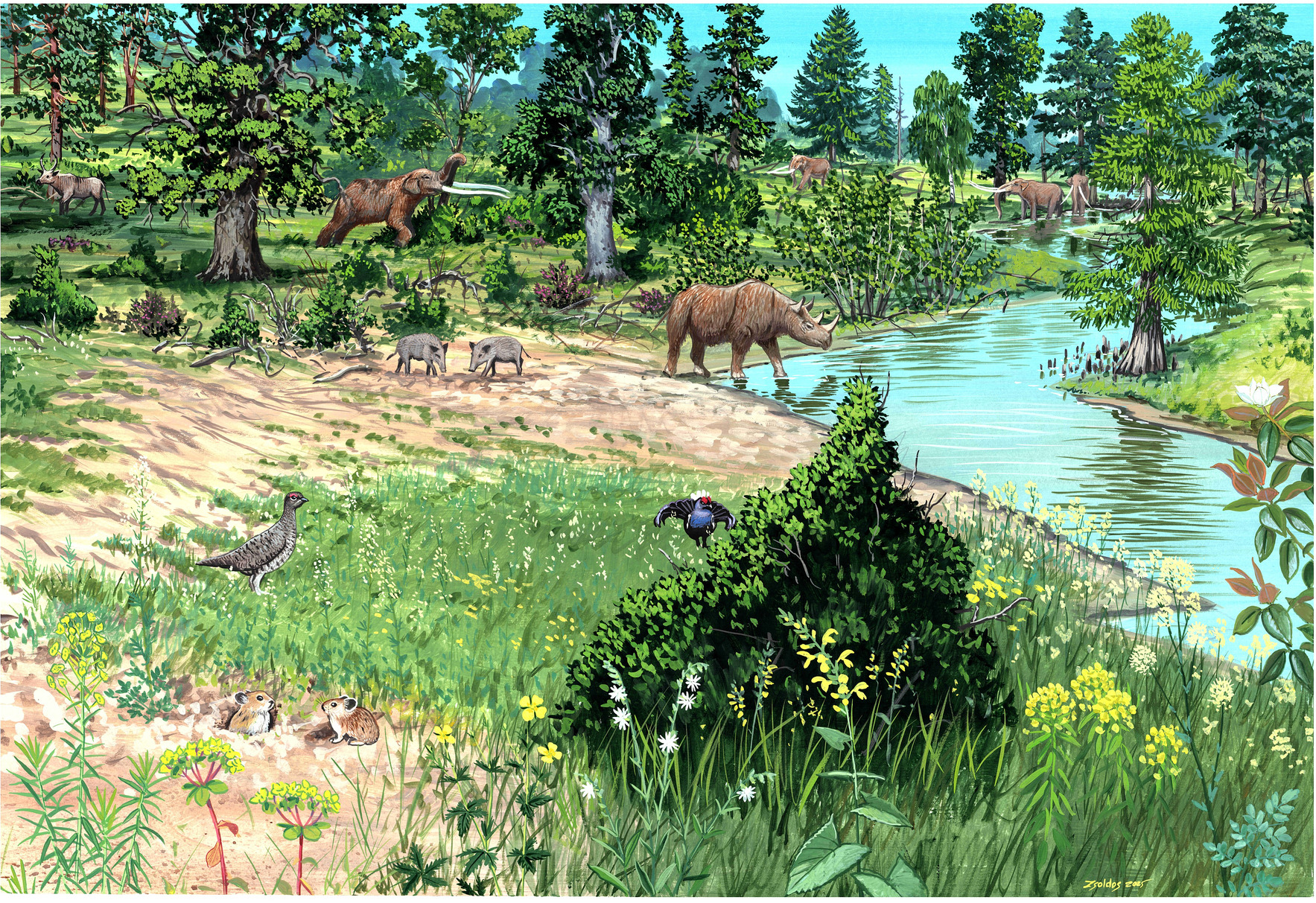
Individuals of "Mammut" borsoni (background upper right) in a Pliocene temperate forested Central European landscape, alongside the fellow proboscidean Anancus arvernensis (upper left), rhinoceros Stephanorhinus etruscus, the pig Sus minor and the bovine Leptobos stenometopon, alongside pikas, ptarmigans and grouse.

Dental microwear and mesowear analysis of specimens from the Pliocene of Romania and England (Red Crag), respectively, as well as isotopic analysis of specimens from Milia, suggest that "M". borsoni was primarily a browser on leaves and twigs of woody plants. In Pliocene Europe, it coexisted with other proboscidean species, including the mammoth Mammuthus rumanus and the "tetralophodont gomphothere" Anancus arvernensis, which also had browsing-based diets.

Other animals that lived alongside "Mammut" borsoni in the late Pliocene of Europe include the tapir Tapirus arvernensis, the monkey Mesopithecus monspessulanus, the bovine Leptobos stenometopon, the pig Sus minor, the deer Pseudodama lyra, the rhinoceros Stephanorhinus elatus, the sabertooth cat Homotherium crenatidens, the hyenas Pliocrocuta perrieri and Chasmaporthetes lunensis, and the giant cheetah Acinonyx pardinensis.

== Distribution and chronology ==
"Mammut" borsoni is known from localities across Europe, spanning from the Iberian Peninsula in the west to Greece and Ukraine in the east. Remains have also been reported from Anatolia (Asian Turkey) and Shanxi in northern China, though it has been argued by some authors that the Chinese remains should be assigned to the separate species M. shansiense. The oldest specimens of the "Mammut" borsoni lineage sensu lato (including remains assigned to "Mammut" obliquelophus) date to the late Miocene (around 9-7 million years ago), while the youngest date to the earliest Pleistocene, around 2-2.5 million years ago (Mammal Neogene zone 17).
