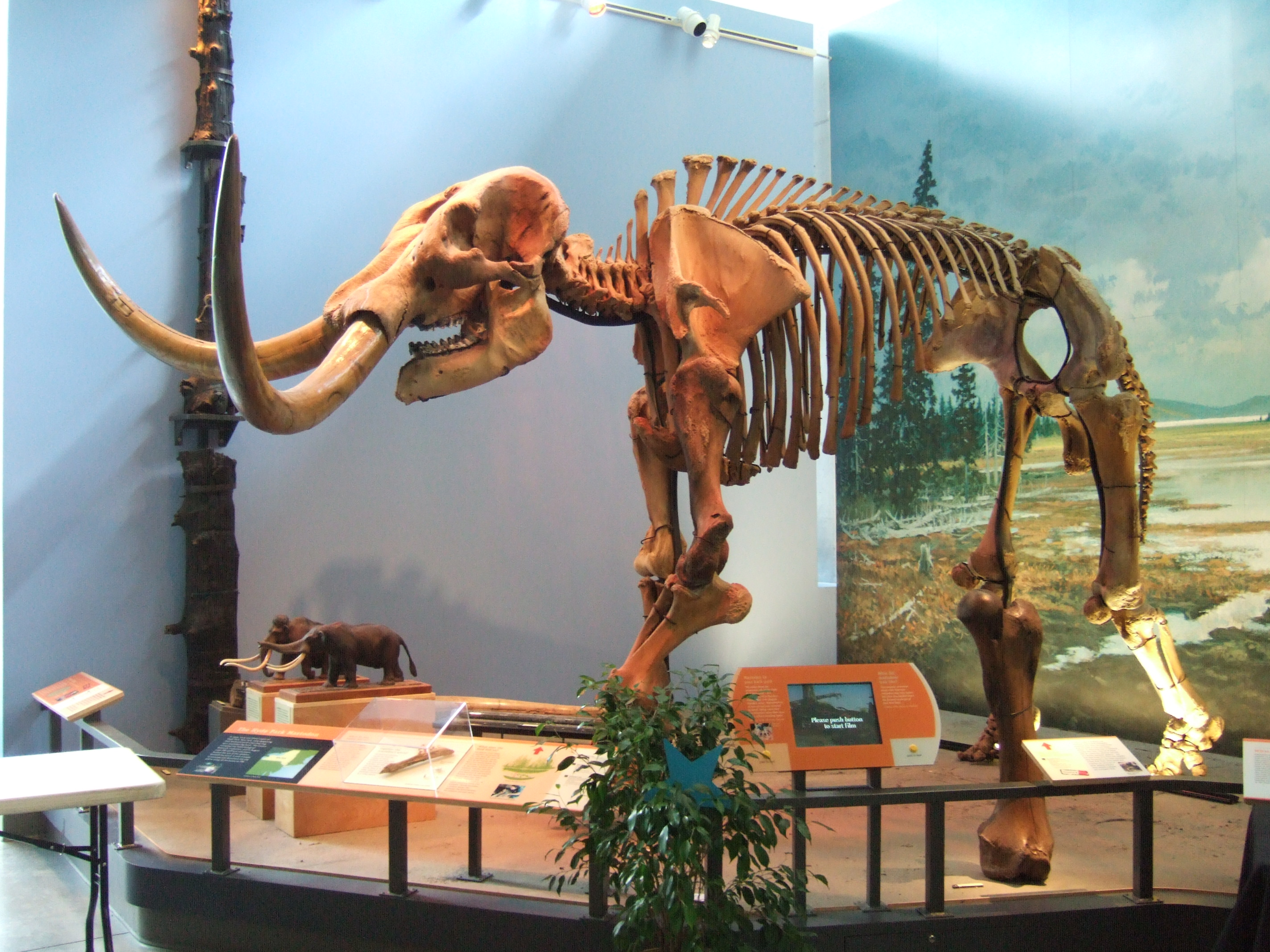
- Mounted American mastodon (Mammut americanum) skeleton, Museum of the Earth

Scientific classification
- Kingdom: Animalia
- Phylum: Chordata
- Class: Mammalia
- Infraclass: Placentalia
- Order: Proboscidea
- Clade: Elephantimorpha
- Clade: †Mammutida
- Superfamily: †Mammutoidea; Hay, 1922
- Family: †Mammutidae; Hay, 1922

Genera
- †Eozygodon Tassy and Pickford, 1983 †Losodokodon Rasmussen & Gutiérrez, 2009 †Mammut Blumenbach, 1799 †Miomastodon? Osborn, 1922 †Sinomammut Mothé et al., 2016 †Zygolophodon Vacek, 1877

Synonyms
- Mastodontidae Gray, 1821

= Mammutidae =

Mammutidae Temporal range: Late Oligocene - Holocene 27.5–0.011 Ma

Extinct family of mammals

Mammutidae is an extinct family of proboscideans belonging to Elephantimorpha. It is best known for the mastodons (genus Mammut) which inhabited North America from the Late Miocene (around 8 million years ago) until their extinction at the beginning of the Holocene around 11,000 years ago. The earliest fossils of the group are known from the Late Oligocene of Africa, around 24 million years ago, and fossils of the group have also been found across Eurasia. The name "mastodon" derives from Ancient Greek μαστός (mastós), meaning "nipple", and ὀδούς (odoús), meaning "tooth", referring to their characteristic teeth.

== Description ==
Mammutids are characterised by their zygodont molars, where pairs of parallel cusps are merged into sharp-sided riges, which are morphologically conservative and differ little between mammutid species. Like other members of Elephantimorpha, mammutids exhibited horizontal tooth replacement like modern elephants. Some authors have argued that horizontal tooth replacement evolved in parallel in mammutids and members of Elephantida (which includes gomphotheres and elephants), though this is uncertain. Compared to modern elephants, the bones of most mammutids were more robust, with the limb bones in particular being massive, with the legs being proportionally shorter than living elephants, while their bodies were proportionally more elongate. Early members of the group like Eozygodon and Zygolophodon had elongate mandibular symphysis (the front-most part) of the lower jaws with lower incisors/tusks (which tend to be flattened and narrow in shape), while in later representatives like Sinomammut and Mammut, the lower incisors/tusks were either lost or only vestigially present, and the lower jaws shortened (brevirostrine). This process happened convergently amongst other elephantimorph proboscideans, including gomphotheres, stegodontids, and elephantids. Mammutids are thought to have had prehensile trunks like those of living elephants, with those of Mammut suggested to have been possibly long enough to reach the ground. The upper tusks in primitive mammutids are relatively small as well as being downward (ventrally) and outward (laterally) curving, while those of mastodons (Mammut) are large and upward curving, often reaching around 3 metres (9.8 ft) in length. The mammutid "Mammut" borsoni is one of the largest of all proboscideans with an estimated average male body weight of 16 tonnes (35,000 lb) making it one of the largest land mammals of all time, with the tusks of this species being the longest known of any animal, reaching over 5 metres (16 ft) in length. The encephalization quotient of mammutids is lower than those of modern elephants, indicating mammutids had proportionally smaller brains relative to body size, though their brains are proportionally larger than those of more primitive non-elephantimorph proboscideans.

Gallery of Mammutidae
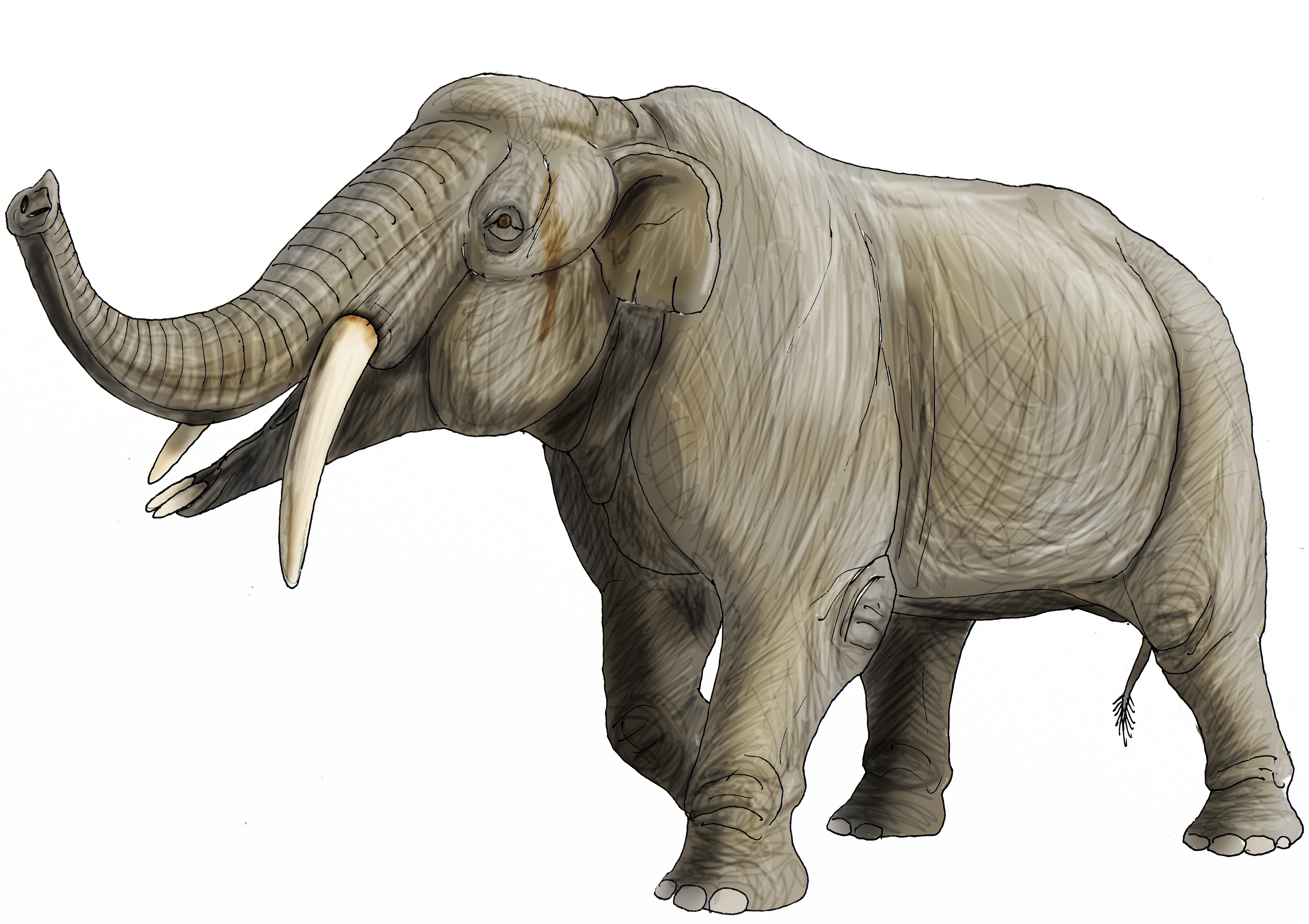
Life restoration of Zygolophodon proavus, showing elongate lower jaw with lower tusks, and downward curving upper tusks

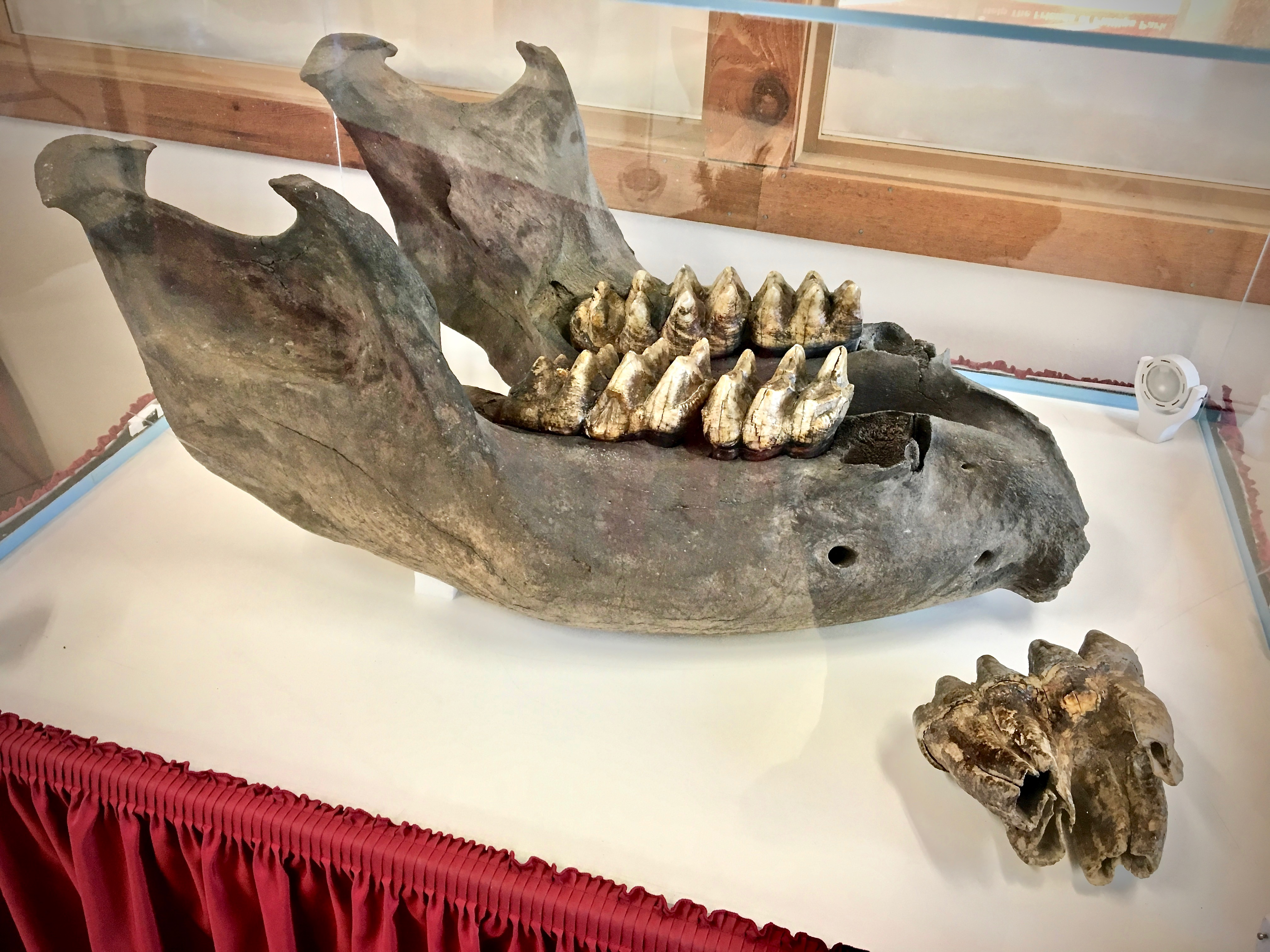
Lower jaw of an American mastodon (Mammut americanum) with teeth

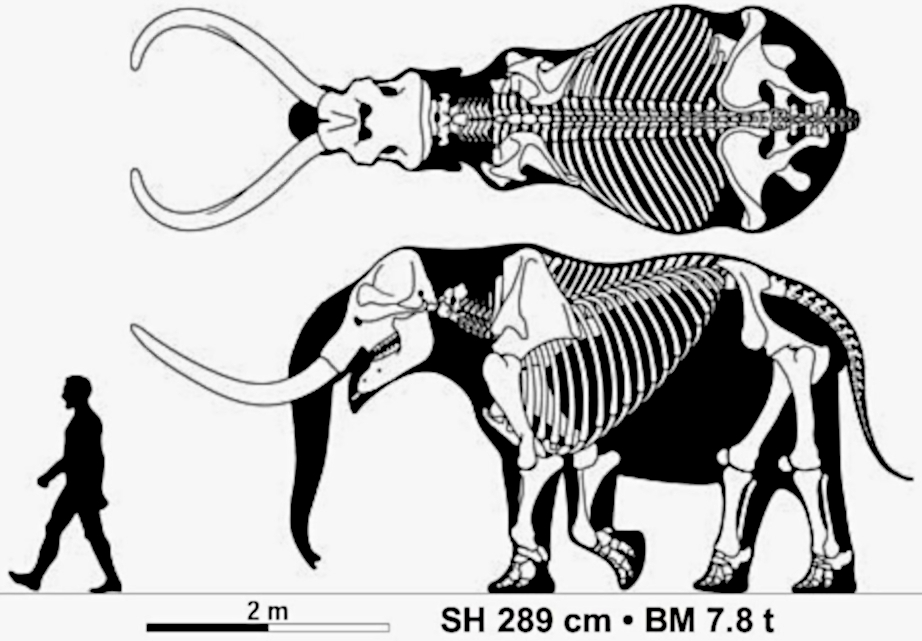
Size an American mastodon (Mammut americanum) bull, compared to a human

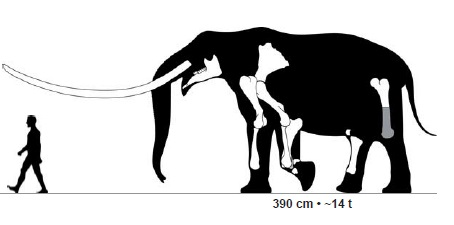
Size of an adult male of "Mammut" borsoni, the largest known mammutid and one of the largest land mammals of all time, compared to a human

== Ecology ==
Members of Mammutidae are thought to have been primarily browsers on the foliage and twigs of trees and shrubs. The jaws of mammutids are adapted to powerful vertical biting (orthal movement) that served to crush food items and to a considerably lesser extent grind it with side-to side movement. Analysis of American mastodon (Mammut americanum) remains suggests that mammutids had a similar social structure to modern elephants, with herds of adult females and juveniles, with adult males living solitarily or in bonding groups with other males, with adult males periodically engaging in musth-like fighting behaviour against other males. Like other elephantimorphs and modern elephants, mammutids are thought to have utilized infrasonic sound for communication, with the morphology of their hyoid bones and inner ear suggesting that they were both capable of hearing and producing infrasonic calls.

== Evolution ==
Mammutids are the most basal group within Elephantimorpha, with gomphotheres and other members of Elephantida like amebelodonts being more closely related to elephants. Cladogram after Li et al. (2024).

- Elephantiformes
  - Phiomia
  - Elephantimorpha
    - Mammutidae
      - Losodokodon
      - - Eozygodon
        - Zygolophodon (ancestral to Mammut)
    - Elephantida
      - Choerolophodontidae
      - - Amebelodontidae (shovel tuskers)
        - "Gomphotheriidae" (paraphyletic, ancestral to Elephantidae)

Mammutids originated in Africa during the Late Oligocene, with the oldest genus Losodokodon dating to around 27.5-24 million years ago. Mammutids belonging to the genus Zygolophodon (as well as possibly other mammutid genera) entered Eurasia across the "Gomphotherium land bridge" during the early Miocene, around 18 million years ago. Mammutid remains are generally rare in Eurasia in comparison to contemporary gomphotheres and deinotheres. During the late early Miocene, around 16.5 million years ago, a population of Zygolophodon entered North America, giving rise to Mammut. The youngest confirmed records of mammutids in Africa date to around 13 million years ago, though possible Late Miocene fossils have been reported from North Africa. At the beginning of the Pleistocene, around 2 to 2.5 million years ago, the last of the Eurasian mammutids, "Mammut" borsoni became extinct, with members of Mammut persisting in North America until the end of the Pleistocene, approximately 11,000 years ago.
