= Oberweid =

- Municipality
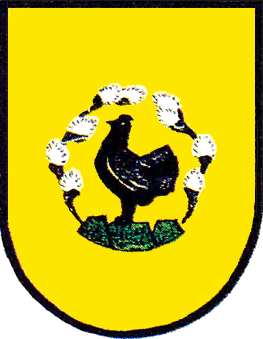
- Coat of arms

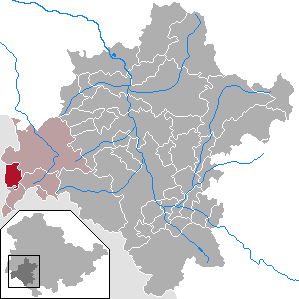
- Location of Oberweid within Schmalkalden-Meiningen district
- Interactive map of Oberweid
- Location within Germany Location within Thuringia
- Coordinates: 50°36′N 10°4′E
- Country: Germany
- State: Thuringia
- District: Schmalkalden-Meiningen
- Municipal assoc.: Hohe Rhön

Government
  - Mayor (2022–28): Tino Hencl

Area
  - Total: 10.25 km^{2} (3.96 sq mi)
- Elevation: 500 m (1,600 ft)

Population (2025-12-31)
  - Total: 475
  - Density: 46.3/km^{2} (120/sq mi)
- Time zone: UTC+01:00 (CET)
  - Summer (DST): UTC+02:00 (CEST)
- Postal codes: 98634
- Dialling codes: 036946
- Vehicle registration: SM
- Website: oberweid.jimdo.com

Oberweid (German pronunciation: [ˈoːbɐvaɪt], lit. 'Upper Weid', in contrast to "Lower Weid") is a municipality in the district Schmalkalden-Meiningen, in Thuringia, Germany. It is part of the Hohe Rhön administrative community, which has its administrative centre in the municipality of Kaltennordheim.

== History ==
The first evidence of human settlement is a stone arrowhead several thousand years old that was found in this century. With the Frankish expansion eastwards, the region became part of the Frankish Empire. Oberweid was first mentioned in 795 in a deed of gift to the Fulda monastery.From 1500 to 1806, the village was part of the Franconian Imperial District. When Count Georg Ernst von Henneberg converted to the Protestant-Lutheran confession in 1544, Oberweid became Protestant. The village belonged to the Kaltennordheim office of the County of Henneberg, later to Saxe-Weimar-Eisenach (Eisenach Oberland). The village had its own parish from 1609 to 2015.

Oberweid was affected by witch hunts from 1629 to 1687: 23 women and two men were tried as witches, 16 people were executed, one woman died under torture and one was punished with expulsion. The first victims were Hans Hauck and his wife Apollonia Hauck in 1629.

For a short time in the 15th century, a glasswork was operated in the village. There were also important art weaving mills and a tapestry factory in the past.

141 men from Oberweid took part in the First World War. Of these, 35 did not return home.

Between 1941 and 1945, numerous farmers in Oberweid employed foreign forced labourers as agricultural labourers. Over 150 Oberweid residents had to take part in the Second World War. Over 60 of them died during the war. In connection with an air raid on Schweinfurt and Nuremberg on 31 March 1944, a Royal Air Force Lancaster crashed below the summit of the Ellenbogen near Oberweid.

On the afternoon of 1 April 1945, Easter Sunday, US troops moved into Oberweid from Unterweid without a fight. Several citizens had already hoisted a white flag on the church tower that morning. This marked the end of the Second World War in this village. In the summer of 1945, the Western Allies withdrew and Oberweid was occupied by Soviet troops.

In 2013 Oberweid was declared the "Official Cat City of Germany" by Rhönkanal.

== Politics ==
=== Municipal Council ===
The Oberweid municipal council is made up of 8 councillors.

- Schützenverein Oberweid 1990 e.V.: 2 Seats
- Freie Wählergemeinschaft (FWG) Oberweid: 3 Seats
- Fußballverein SV Germania Oberweid 1929 e.V.: 3 Seats

=== Mayor ===
The mayor Willi Steineckers was elected on the 5th of June 2016.

== Celebrities ==
- Waldo Dörsch (1928–2012), Sculptor
