= Fischberg Castle =

Fischberg
- Höhn
- Klings und Diedorf (Dermbach)
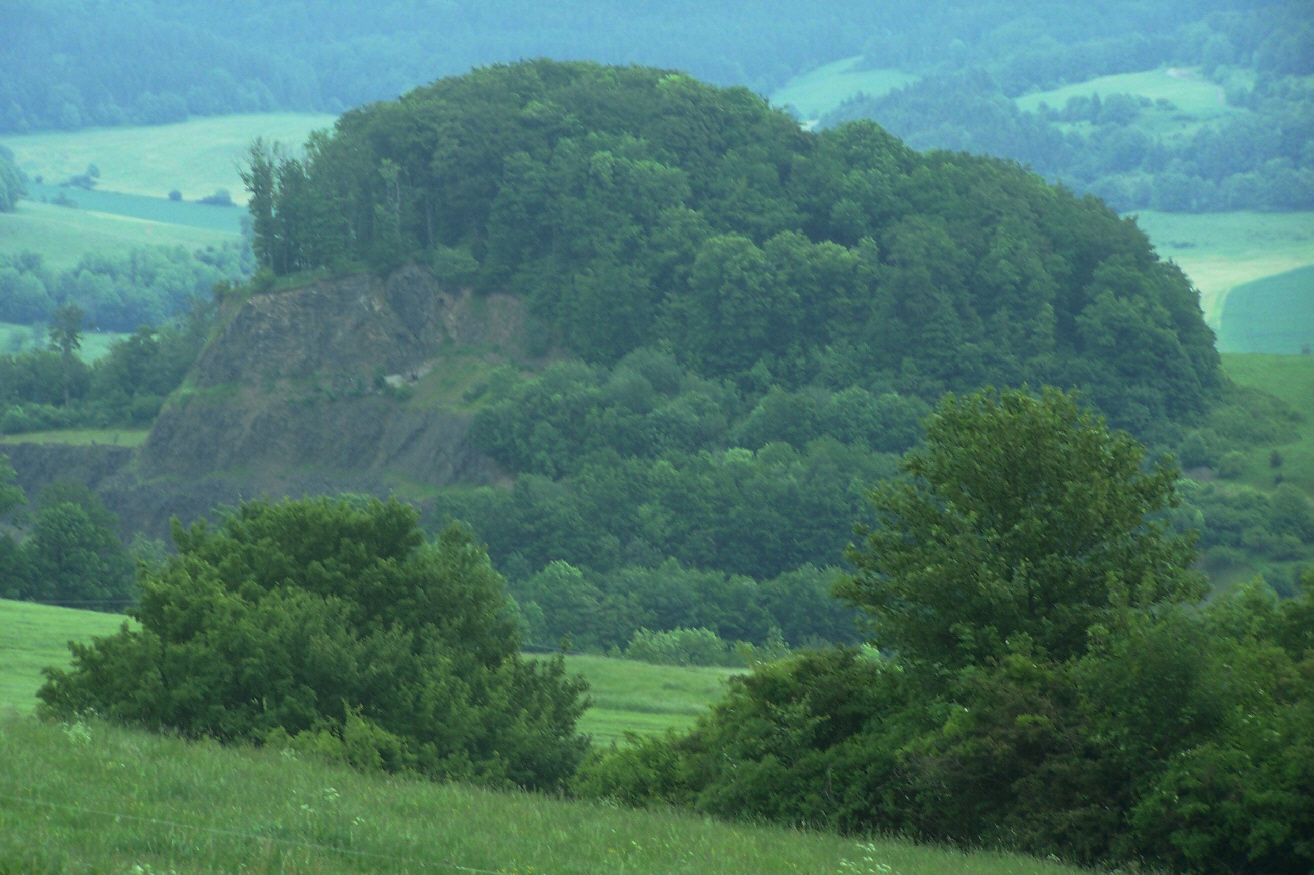
- Fischberg (2009)

Site information
- Type: hill castle, summit location
- Code: DE-TH
- Condition: ditches and wall remains

Location
- Coordinates: 50°39′20″N 10°7′7.89″E
- Height: 510 m above sea level (NN)

Site history
- Built: c. 1100
- Materials: vaulting

Garrison information
- Occupants: counts

Fischberg Castle (Burgruine Fischberg) was a high medieval fortification in the Felda valley that was sited on an exposed hill above the villages of Klings, Fischbach and Diedorf. Its ruins currently stand in the county of Wartburgkreis (Thuringia) - in the Anterior Rhön, part of a mountain region in central Germany.

== Location ==
The ruins of the hilltop castle are located at a height of 510 m above sea level (NN) on the summit of the Höhn, about 800 metres northeast of the centre of Klings and 700 metres southwest of the neighbouring village of Diedorf. The parish boundary between these two villages runs over the castle hill. The western part of the castle site has almost been destroyed by the adjacent rock quarry.

== Description ==
The medieval site was relatively small and, according to the findings from excavations, comprised a bergfried, a main house and a secondary building as well as an enceinte. The castle used the existing banks and ditches of an earlier fortification. The gateway was probably in the south where, even today, a farm track runs up the hill. On the western slopes of the castle hill was a well, by the mule track, that was used by the castle inhabitants.

== Literature ==
- Michael Köhler (2001), Thüringer Burgen und befestigte vor- und frühgeschichtliche Wohnplätze (in German), Jena: Jenzig-Verlag, p. 101, ISBN 3-910141-43-9
- Thomas Bienert (2000), Mittelalterliche Burgen in Thüringen (in German), Gudensberg-Gleichen: Wartberg Verlag, p. 323, ISBN 3-86134-631-1
- Michael Weih (1985), "Was ein Bodendenkmal erzählt: Burg Fischberg in der Rhön", Urgeschichte und Heimatforschung (in German), vol. Heft 22, Weimar, pp. 59–61
- Adalbert Schröter (1989), Land an der Straße. Die Geschichte der katholischen Pfarreien in der thüringischen Rhön (in German), Leipzig: St. Benno Verlag, pp. 77–80, ISBN 3-7462-0430-5
- Bruno Kühn (1854), "Die Geschichte des Amtsbezirks Dermbach", Zeitschrift des Vereins für Thüringische Geschichte und Alterthumskunde (in German), vol. Band 1, Jena: Friedrich Frommann Verlag, pp. 249–296
