= Milea, Grevena =

Milea Μηλέα
- Community
- Location within Greece
- Coordinates: 40°10.8′N 21°28.5′E
- Country: Greece
- Administrative region: Western Macedonia
- Regional unit: Grevena
- Municipality: Grevena
- Municipal unit: Irakleotes

Area
  - Community: 10.077 km^{2} (3.891 sq mi)
- Elevation: 650 m (2,130 ft)

Population (2021)
  - Community: 135
  - Density: 13.4/km^{2} (34.7/sq mi)
- Time zone: UTC+2 (EET)
  - Summer (DST): UTC+3 (EEST)
- Postal code: 510 30
- Area code: +30-2462
- Vehicle registration: PN

Milea (Greek: Μηλέα; also Milia) is a village and a community of the Grevena municipality. Before the 2011 local government reform it was a part of the municipality of Irakleotes, of which it was a municipal district. The 2021 census recorded 135 residents in the village. The community of Milea covers an area of 10.077 km^{2}.

== History ==
Milea was populated by Greek speaking Muslim Vallahades. The 1920 Greek census recorded 190 people in the village, and 15 inhabitants (4 families) were Muslim in 1923. Following the Greek–Turkish population exchange, Greek refugee families in Milea were from Pontus (11) in 1926. The 1928 Greek census recorded 242 village inhabitants. In 1928, the refugee families numbered 11 (36 people).

The village's original position has changed in the early '70s, when it was completely abandoned due to soil instability. The aforementioned village is now called Palia Milea (Greek: Παλιά Μηλέα, which means Old Milea) and it maintains its original architecture where stone is the prevailing material.

== Natural History Museum ==
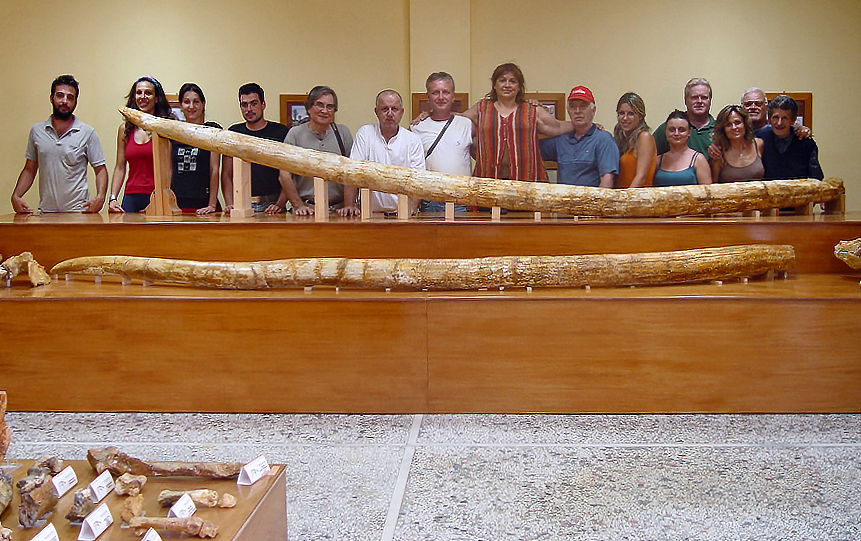
Tusks of "Mammut" borsoni from Milia, the longest tusks ever recorded.

In 1997 an inhabitant called Athanasios Delivos discovered the first pair of tusks by chance, after a heavy rainfall. Their length is 4,39m. Dr. Evaggelia Tsoukala with her colleagues from Aristotle University of Thessaloniki was responsible for the excavations. During the excavations which also continued in the sequential years, a partial skeleton of the mastodont "Mammut" borsoni (Hays, 1834) (Proboscidea) was discovered. The skeleton includes substantial portions of the skull — maxillary area — with left and right molar series, with the longest upper tusks ever found in Greece (4.39 m), the most complete mandible with left and right molar series (M2 + M3) and two lower incisor tusks, as well as post-cranial skeleton. It represents a very large adult of about 40 years in age.

In 2007, Dr. Tsoukala and her team discovered new, longer tusks along with other findings. Their length is 5,02m and they have been awarded the World's Guinness Records Award. The mastodont's age is evaluated at 3.000.000 years. Various other parts of mastodonts and other pre-historic animals were found there. All those findings can be seen at the Natural History Museum of Milia. It already counts more than 15.000 visitors from all over the world.
