= Klings =

- Ortsteil of Kaltennordheim
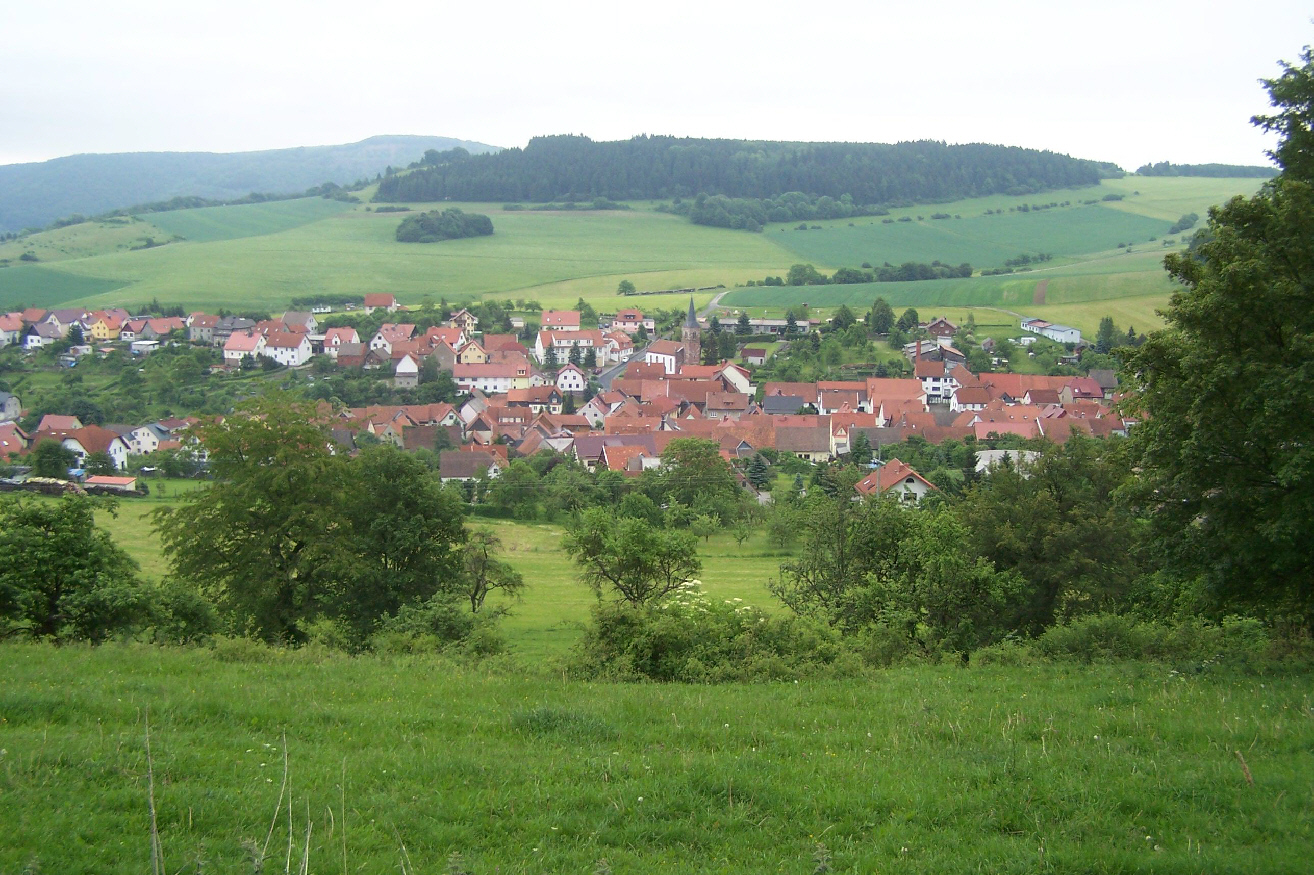

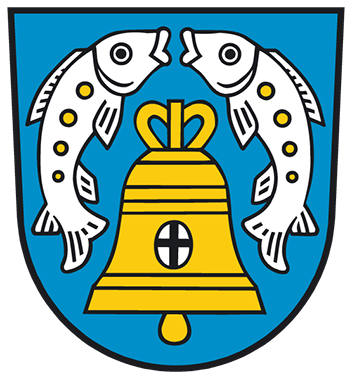
- Coat of arms
- Interactive map of Klings
- Location within Germany Location within Thuringia
- Coordinates: 50°39′N 10°7′E
- Country: Germany
- State: Thuringia
- District: Schmalkalden-Meiningen
- Town: Kaltennordheim

Area
  - Total: 6.51 km^{2} (2.51 sq mi)
- Elevation: 475 m (1,558 ft)

Population (2012-12-31)
  - Total: 464
  - Density: 71.3/km^{2} (185/sq mi)
- Time zone: UTC+01:00 (CET)
  - Summer (DST): UTC+02:00 (CEST)
- Postal codes: 36452
- Dialling codes: 036966
- Vehicle registration: SM

Klings (German pronunciation: [klɪŋs]) is a village and a former municipality in the Schmalkalden-Meiningen district of Thuringia, Germany. Since 31 December 2013, it is part of the town Kaltennordheim.

== See also ==
- Fischberg Castle
