= Massacre Lake =

Lake in the U.S. state of Nevada

- Location within Nevada
- Location: Washoe County, Nevada
- Coordinates: 41°39′12″N 119°36′18″W
- Surface elevation: 1,704 m (5,591 ft)

Massacre Lake is a lake in the northwest of the U.S. state of Nevada. It was named in commemoration of a supposed 1850 massacre of a party of pioneers. However, a later study suggested that the supposed massacre never took place, due to it being absent in contemporary records. As of 2021, the lake is the site of the oldest known mastodon remains in North America, dating to 16.5-16.4 million years ago.
