= Melpers =

- Ortsteil of Kaltennordheim
- Interactive map of Melpers
- Location within Germany Location within Thuringia
- Coordinates: 50°32′58″N 10°8′22″E
- Country: Germany
- State: Thuringia
- District: Schmalkalden-Meiningen
- Town: Kaltennordheim

Area
  - Total: 2.83 km^{2} (1.09 sq mi)
- Elevation: 490 m (1,610 ft)

Population (2017-12-31)
  - Total: 90
  - Density: 32/km^{2} (82/sq mi)
- Time zone: UTC+01:00 (CET)
  - Summer (DST): UTC+02:00 (CEST)
- Postal codes: 98634
- Dialling codes: 036946
- Vehicle registration: SM

Melpers (German pronunciation: [ˈmɛlpɐs]) is a village and a former municipality in the Schmalkalden-Meiningen district of Thuringia, Germany. Since 1 January 2019, it is part of the town Kaltennordheim.

Goethe called it "mein geliebtes Malbers" or my beloved Malbers.
