= Birx, Thuringia =

Birx
- Municipality
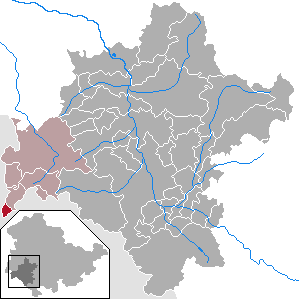
- Location of Birx within Schmalkalden-Meiningen district
- Interactive map of Birx
- Location within Germany Location within Thuringia
- Coordinates: 50°31′N 10°3′E
- Country: Germany
- State: Thuringia
- District: Schmalkalden-Meiningen
- Municipal assoc.: Hohe Rhön

Government
  - Mayor (2022–28): Steffen Hohmann

Area
  - Total: 2.76 km^{2} (1.07 sq mi)
- Elevation: 740 m (2,430 ft)

Population (2025-12-31)
  - Total: 168
  - Density: 60.9/km^{2} (158/sq mi)
- Time zone: UTC+01:00 (CET)
  - Summer (DST): UTC+02:00 (CEST)
- Postal codes: 98634
- Dialling codes: 036946
- Vehicle registration: SM
- Website: www.vgem-hoherhoen.de

Birx is a municipality in the district Schmalkalden-Meiningen, in Thuringia, Germany.
