= Fischbach/Rhön =

- Ortsteil of Kaltennordheim
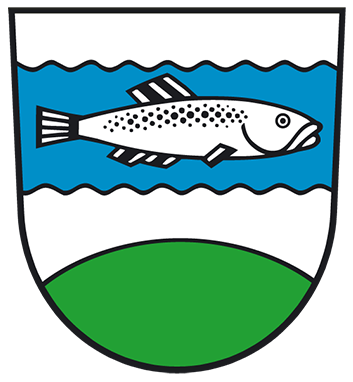
- Coat of arms
- Interactive map of Fischbach/Rhön
- Location within Germany Location within Thuringia
- Coordinates: 50°39′7″N 10°8′30″E
- Country: Germany
- State: Thuringia
- District: Schmalkalden-Meiningen
- Town: Kaltennordheim

Area
  - Total: 7.02 km^{2} (2.71 sq mi)
- Elevation: 410 m (1,350 ft)

Population (2012-12-31)
  - Total: 555
  - Density: 79.1/km^{2} (205/sq mi)
- Time zone: UTC+01:00 (CET)
  - Summer (DST): UTC+02:00 (CEST)
- Postal codes: 36452
- Dialling codes: 036966
- Vehicle registration: SM

Fischbach/Rhön (German pronunciation: [ˈfɪʃbax]) is a village and a former municipality in the Schmalkalden-Meiningen district of Thuringia, Germany. Since 31 December 2013, it is part of the town Kaltennordheim.

== See also ==
- Fischberg Castle
