= Frankenheim =

- Municipality
- Coat of arms

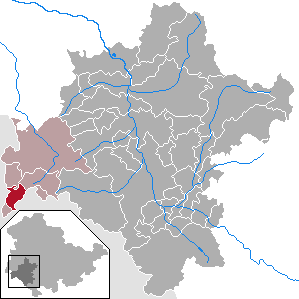
- Location of Frankenheim within Schmalkalden-Meiningen district
- Interactive map of Frankenheim
- Location within Germany Location within Thuringia
- Coordinates: 50°32′N 10°05′E
- Country: Germany
- State: Thuringia
- District: Schmalkalden-Meiningen
- Municipal assoc.: Hohe Rhön

Government
  - Mayor (2022–28): Alexander Schmitt

Area
  - Total: 9.11 km^{2} (3.52 sq mi)
- Elevation: 750–780 m (2,460–2,560 ft)

Population (2025-12-31)
  - Total: 1,029
  - Density: 113/km^{2} (293/sq mi)
- Time zone: UTC+01:00 (CET)
  - Summer (DST): UTC+02:00 (CEST)
- Postal codes: 98634
- Dialling codes: 036946
- Vehicle registration: SM
- Website: www.frankenheim-online.de

Frankenheim is a municipality in the district of Schmalkalden-Meiningen, in Thuringia, Germany.
