= Fritz Röll =

German sculptor

- Born: 16 March 1879; Kaltennordheim, Germany
- Died: 1 August 1956 (aged 77); Kaltennordheim, Germany
- Occupation: Sculptor

Fritz Röll (16 March 1879 – 1 August 1956) was a German sculptor. His work was part of the sculpture event in the art competition at the 1936 Summer Olympics.
