= Hohe Rhön =

- Verwaltungsgemeinschaft
- Map of Schmalkalden-Meiningen highlighting Hohe Rhön
- Interactive map of Hohe Rhön
- Location within Germany Location within Thuringia
- Coordinates: 50°36′N 10°10′E
- Country: Germany
- State: Thuringia
- District: Schmalkalden-Meiningen
- Seat: Kaltennordheim
- Subdivisions: 5 municipalities

Area
  - Total: 137.29 km^{2} (53.01 sq mi)

Population (2025-12-31)
  - Total: 7,775
  - Density: 56.63/km^{2} (146.7/sq mi)
- Time zone: UTC+01:00 (CET)
  - Summer (DST): UTC+02:00 (CEST)
- Website: vghoherhoen.de

Hohe Rhön is a Verwaltungsgemeinschaft ("collective municipality") in the district Schmalkalden-Meiningen, in Thuringia, Germany. The seat of the Verwaltungsgemeinschaft is in Kaltennordheim.

== Municipalities ==
The Verwaltungsgemeinschaft Hohe Rhön consists of the following municipalities:

1. Birx
2. Erbenhausen
3. Frankenheim
4. Kaltennordheim
5. Oberweid
