= Kaltenwestheim =

- Ortsteil of Kaltennordheim
- Interactive map of Kaltenwestheim
- Location within Germany Location within Thuringia
- Coordinates: 50°36′N 10°7′E
- Country: Germany
- State: Thuringia
- District: Schmalkalden-Meiningen
- Town: Kaltennordheim

Area
  - Total: 19.43 km^{2} (7.50 sq mi)
- Elevation: 500 m (1,600 ft)

Population (2017-12-31)
  - Total: 905
  - Density: 46.6/km^{2} (121/sq mi)
- Time zone: UTC+01:00 (CET)
  - Summer (DST): UTC+02:00 (CEST)
- Postal codes: 98634
- Dialling codes: 036946

Kaltenwestheim (German pronunciation: [ˌkaltn̩ˈvɛsthaɪm]) is a village and a former municipality in the Schmalkalden-Meiningen district of Thuringia, Germany. Since 1 January 2019, it is part of the town Kaltennordheim.
