= Kaltensundheim =

- Ortsteil of Kaltennordheim
- Coat of arms
- Interactive map of Kaltensundheim
- Location within Germany Location within Thuringia
- Coordinates: 50°37′N 10°10′E
- Country: Germany
- State: Thuringia
- District: Schmalkalden-Meiningen
- Town: Kaltennordheim

Area
  - Total: 11.8 km^{2} (4.6 sq mi)
- Elevation: 460 m (1,510 ft)

Population (2017-12-31)
  - Total: 795
  - Density: 67.4/km^{2} (174/sq mi)
- Time zone: UTC+01:00 (CET)
  - Summer (DST): UTC+02:00 (CEST)
- Postal codes: 98634
- Dialling codes: 036946
- Website: kaltennordheim.de

Kaltensundheim (German pronunciation: [ˌkaltn̩ˈzʊnthaɪm]) is a village and a former municipality in the district Schmalkalden-Meiningen, in Thuringia, Germany. Since 1 January 2019, it is part of the town Kaltennordheim.
