= Losodokodon =

Losodokodon Temporal range: Late Oligocene ~27–24 Ma

Scientific classification
- Kingdom: Animalia
- Phylum: Chordata
- Class: Mammalia
- Order: Proboscidea
- Family: †Mammutidae
- Genus: †Losodokodon; Rasmussen & Gutiérrez, 2009

Species
- L. losodokius (type)

Extinct genus of mammals

Losodokodon ("Losodok tooth") is an extinct genus of large herbivorous mammals belonging to the family Mammutidae. It was first described in 2009 by David Tab Rasmussen and Mercedes Gutiérrez from fossils found in the Erageleit Formation of northwestern Kenya. Losodokodon lived during the Late Oligocene, between 27 and 24 million years ago. It is known from isolated molars and premolars. Dental mesowear suggests a browsing diet.
