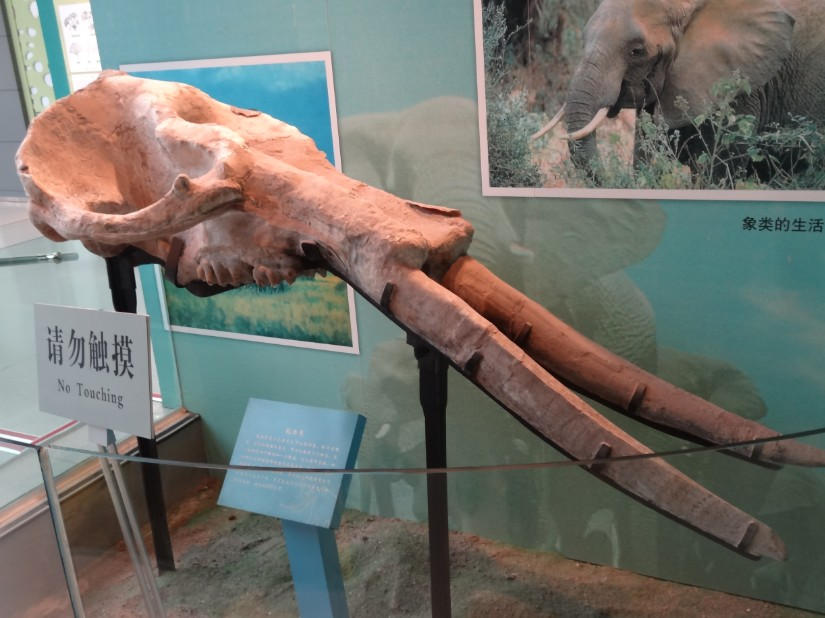
- Skull of Zygolophodon sp. from Laogou, Gansu Province, China
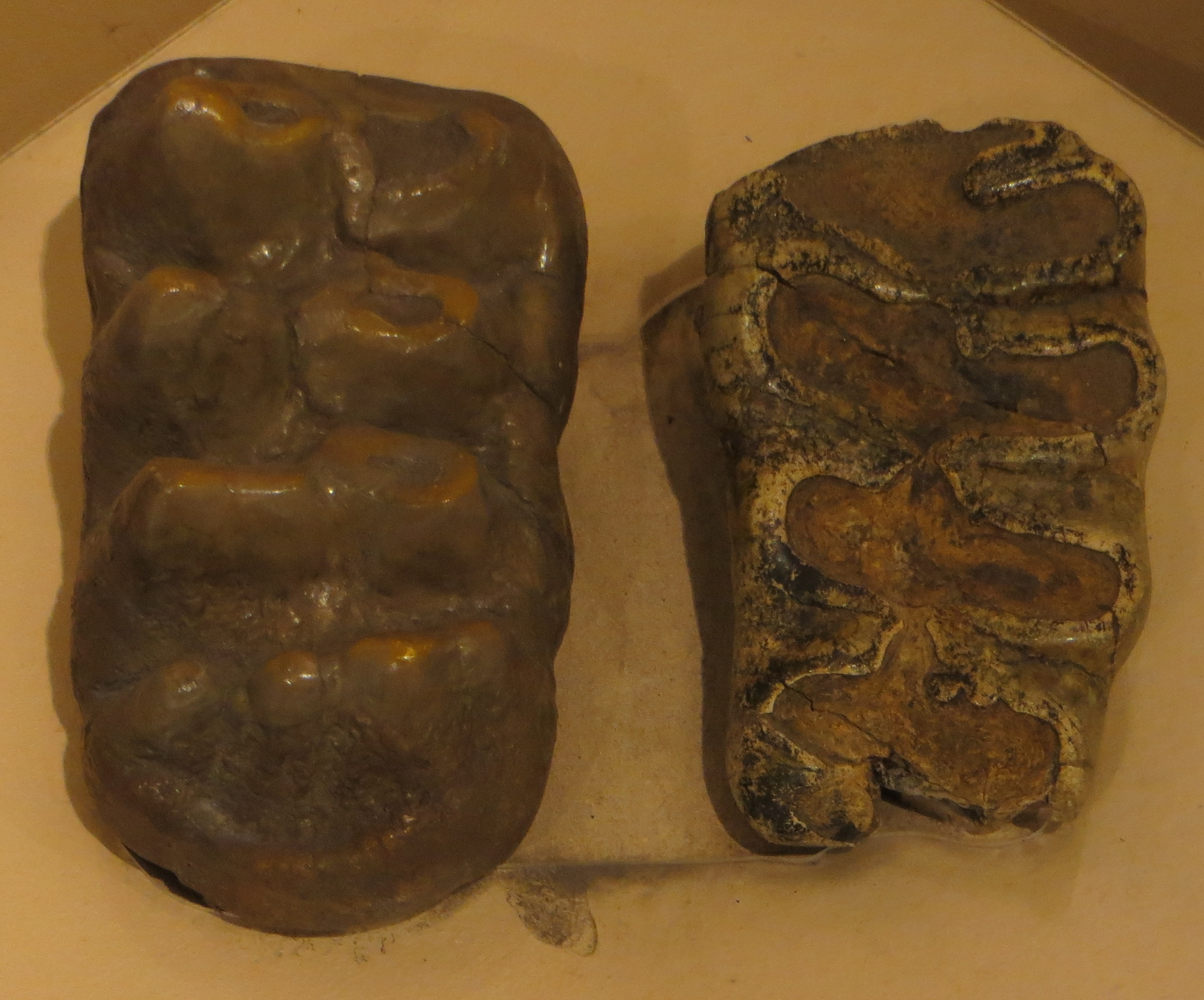
- Molars of Zygolophodon turicensis

Scientific classification
- Kingdom: Animalia
- Phylum: Chordata
- Class: Mammalia
- Order: Proboscidea
- Family: †Mammutidae
- Genus: †Zygolophodon; Vacek, 1877

Type species
- †Mastodon turicensis (Schinz, 1824)

Species
- Z. aegyptensis Sanders & Miller, 2002; Z. atavus Borissiak, 1936; Z. gobiensis Osborn & Granger, 1932; Z. metachinjiensis Osborn, 1929; Z. microgigas Sanders, 2026; Z. proavus Cope, 1873; Z. turicensis Schintz, 1824; Possibly valid species: Z. chinjiensis Chow & Chang, 1978; Z. lufengensis Zhang, 1982; Z. nemonguensis Chow & Chang, 1961

Synonyms
- List: Mastodon proavus Cope, 1873; Mastodon tapiroides Cuvier, 1824; Mastodon turicensis Schnitz, 1824; Mammut tapiroides Cuvier, 1824; Mammut turicensis Schnitz, 1824

= Zygolophodon =

Zygolophodon Temporal range: Early Miocene–Late Miocene

Extinct genus of mammutid proboscidean

Zygolophodon is an extinct genus of mammutid proboscidean that lived during the Miocene in Africa, Eurasia, and North America. It is suggested to be ancestral to Mammut, the genus containing the American mastodons.

== Description ==
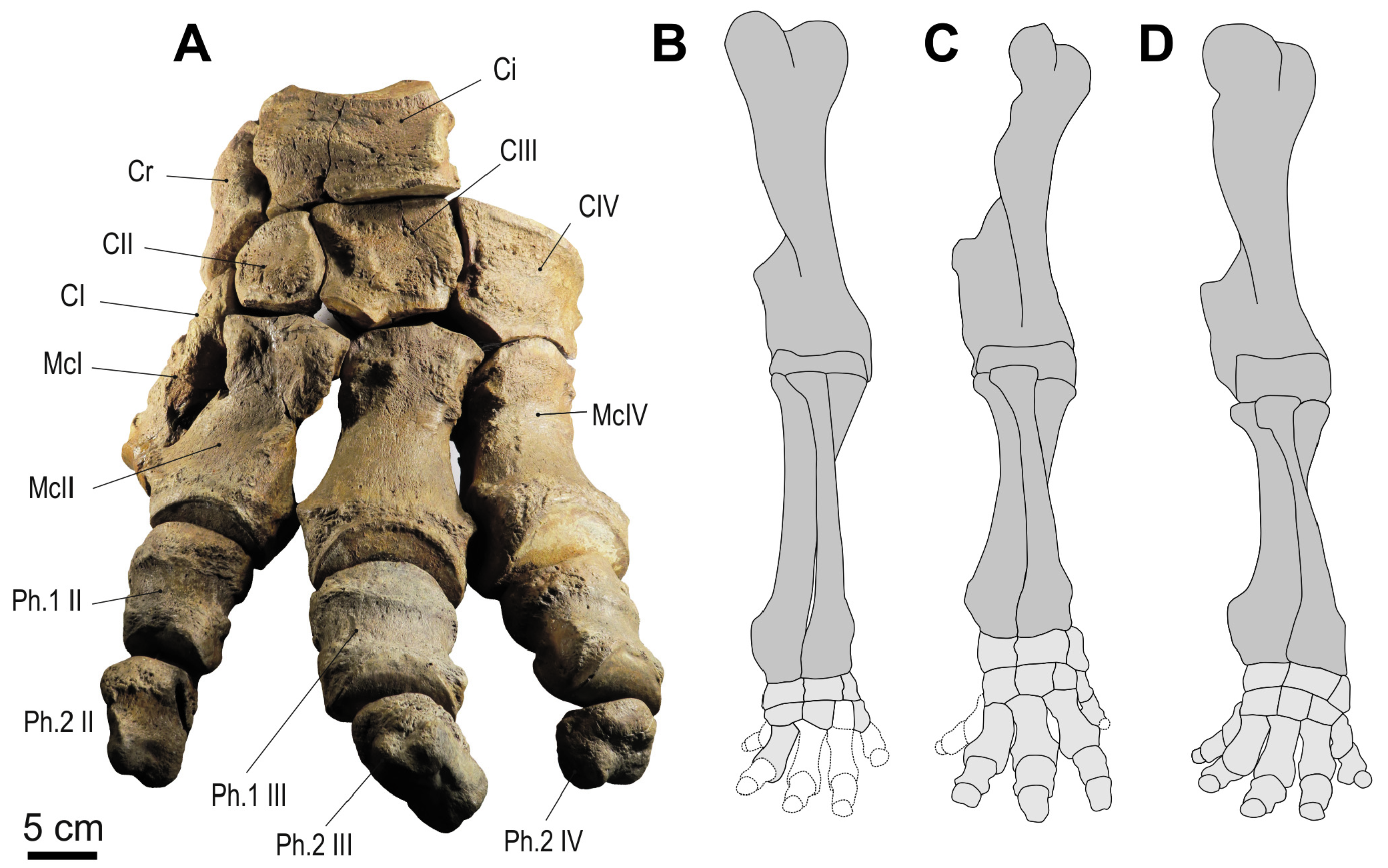
Foot of "Mammut" borsoni (left) and the forelimb anatomy of Zygolophodon turicensis (B), compared to "Mammut" borsoni (C) and the American mastodon (Mammut americanum) (D)

Lower jaw of the "Unity" specimen of Zygolophodon proavus (OMSI 1946.02.1026), showing elongate mandibular symphysis and lower tusks

As with other mammutids, the molars have a zygodont morphology. As is typical for early members of Elephantimorpha, the fused front region of the lower jaw (the mandibular symphysis) is primitively elongate and bears tusks/incisors, similar to Gomphotherium, as exhibited in specimens of species like Z. proavus, but in some individuals of Z. turicensis, the front part of the lower jaw is short and sometimes in addition lacks lower tusks. The upper tusks have enamel bands and are untwisted and downward curving, and outwardly diverge from each other. The jaws retained permanent premolar teeth. Species probably reached similar sizes to the American mastodon, with a shoulder height of 2.5–3 metres (8 ft 2 in – 9 ft 10 in) estimated for the species Z. metachinjiensis.

== Ecology ==
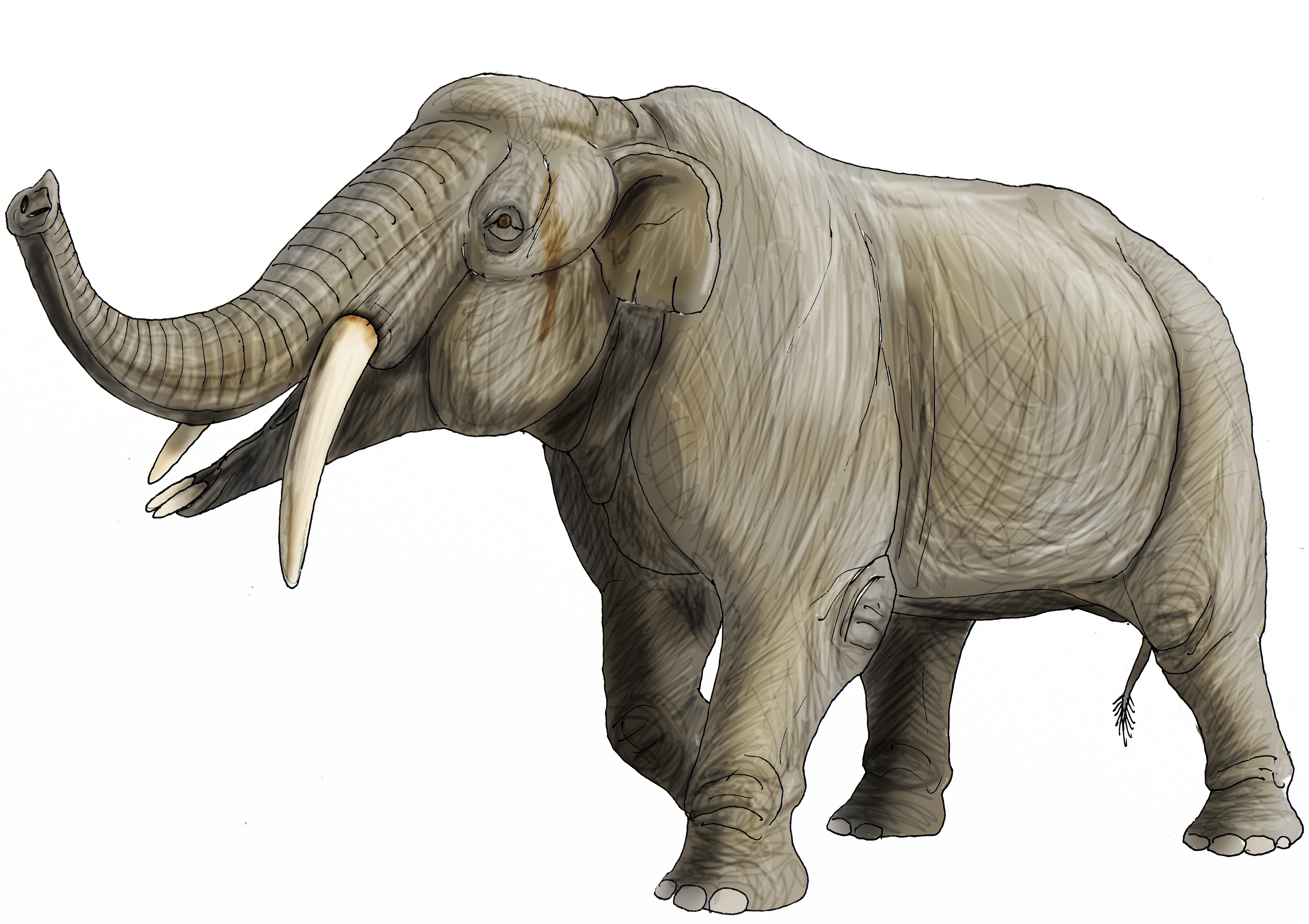
Life restoration of Zygolophodon proavus, the likely ancestor of the American mastodons (Mammut)

Zygolophodon is suggested to have primarily had a browsing-based diet. Its teeth primarily served to vertically chew plant material.

== Taxonomy and evolution ==
Zygolophodon belongs in the family Mammutidae, whose best known member is the American mastodon (Mammut americanum). Due to the conservatism of tooth morphology in Zygolophodon and the fact that most species are only or mostly known from molar teeth, is it difficult to determine the true number of valid species.

The genus likely originated in Africa. The oldest species is Z. aegyptensis, known from Egypt and Namibia, dating to the late Early Miocene-early Middle Miocene. The species Z. turicensis had a widespread distribution in both Africa (Kenya, Tunisia), Anatolia and Europe, dating to the Early-Late Miocene, with its earliest appearance in Europe being approximately 18-17 million years ago, and last appearance in the region dating to around 7-6 million years ago. The youngest confirmed record of Zygolophodon in Africa dates to around 13 million years ago, based on teeth suggested to belong to Z. turicensis found in Kenya, though a possible younger record is known from the Late Miocene of Algeria.

The species Z. tapiroides (Desmarets, 1822) is considered invalid. The taxonomy of East Asian Zygolophodon is uncertain. Tassy et al. (1988) synonymised many Chinese species with Z. gobiensis (including Z. lufengensis, Z. chinjiensis, Z. nemonguensis, Z. gromovae and Z. jiningensis, as well as Miomastodon tongxiensis), with Z. gobiensis also known from Mongolia, but other authors suggest that at least some of these species may be valid. The species Z. atavus is known from the early Middle Miocene of Kazakhstan. The oldest remains of Zygolophodon on the Indian subcontinent are known from the Bugti Hills of Pakistan, dating to around 19-17 million years ago. The species Z. metachinjiensis is known from the mid-Late Miocene (around 13.8 to 12.4 million years ago) of Pakistan. Zygolophodon has also been reported from western India, dating to the mid Miocene, and other probable remains dating to the Late Miocene, around 10 million years old, representing the youngest mammutids on the Indian subcontinent. An indeterminate species has also been reported from Thailand, of uncertain but probably Late Miocene age.

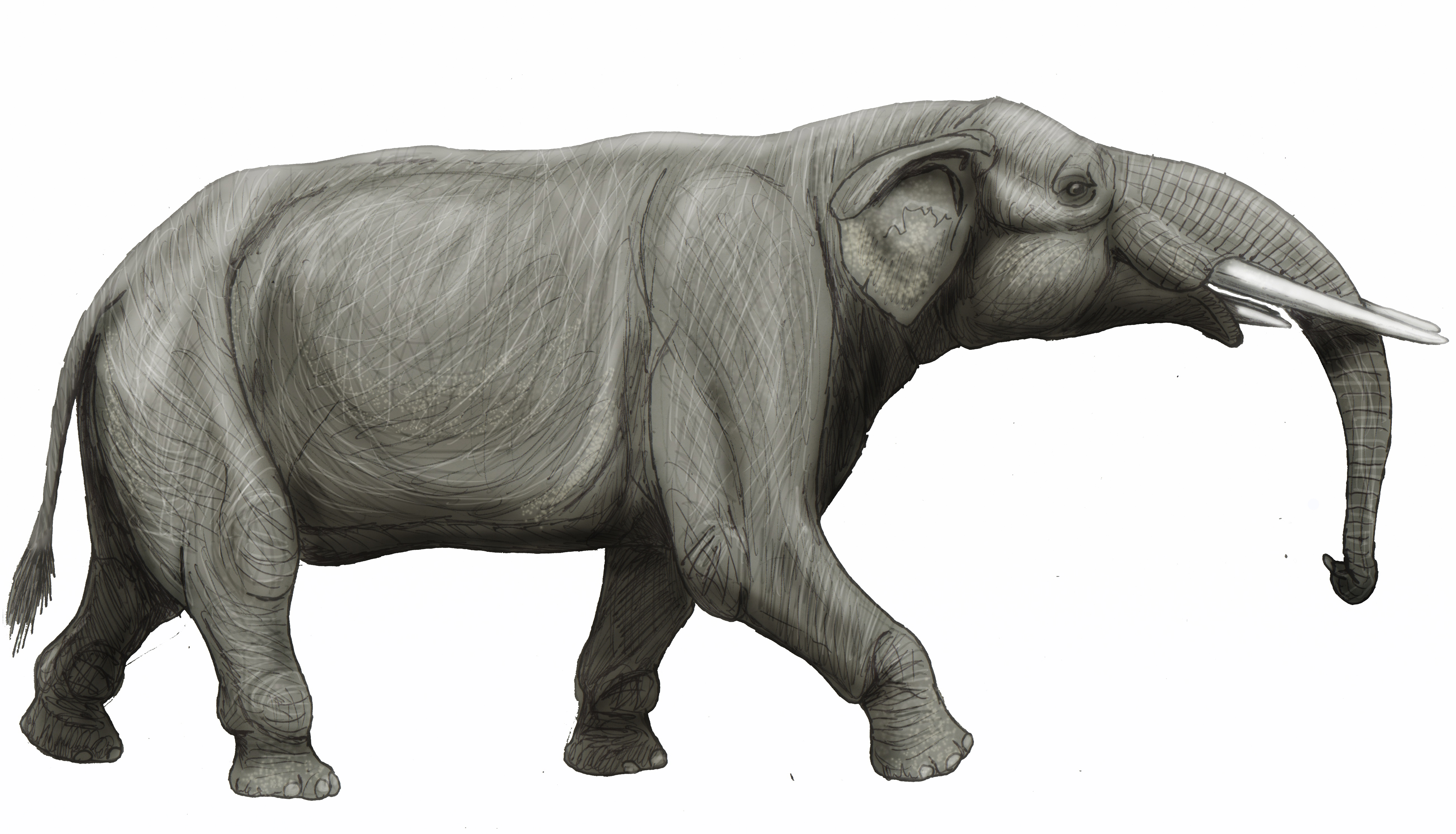
Life restoration of Z. turicensis with a shortened (brevirostrine) lower jaw. Z. turicensis is suggest to be the ancestor of "Mammut" borsoni, one of the largest land mammals ever

Zygolophodon entered North America during the latter part of the Early Miocene (during the late Hemingfordian faunal stage), with the oldest record being a partial tooth from Massacre Lake, Nevada, dating to 16.5-16.4 million years ago. Remains of Zygolophodon are known from across western and central North America during the following Barstovian (including Colorado, California, Montana, Oregon, Nebraska, Nevada, Wyoming and Saskatchewan). Z. proavus currently represents the only known North American species of Zygolophodon. The youngest specimens of Z. proavus date to approximately 11-12 million years ago. The genus Mammut, containing the American mastodons, is thought to be descended from Zygolophodon, most likely Z. proavus. The gigantic Eurasian species "Mammut" borsoni, which is suggested to most likely descend from Z. turicensis, is the youngest member of Mammutidae in Eurasia, persisting from the Late Miocene into the Earliest Pleistocene, around 2.5-2 million years ago. "M." borsoni has sometimes been placed in Zygolophodon, though its taxonomic placement is controversial.

Some authors have suggested placing M. tongxinensis, Z. gobiensis and Z. metachinjiensis within a revived Miomastodon, which was originally described for the North American Miomastodon merriami. Miomastodon is usually treated as a synonym of Zygolophodon (with M. merriami typically considered a synonym of Z. proavus) and other authors have reacted with caution to the proposal.
