= Kaltenlengsfeld =

- Ortsteil of Kaltennordheim
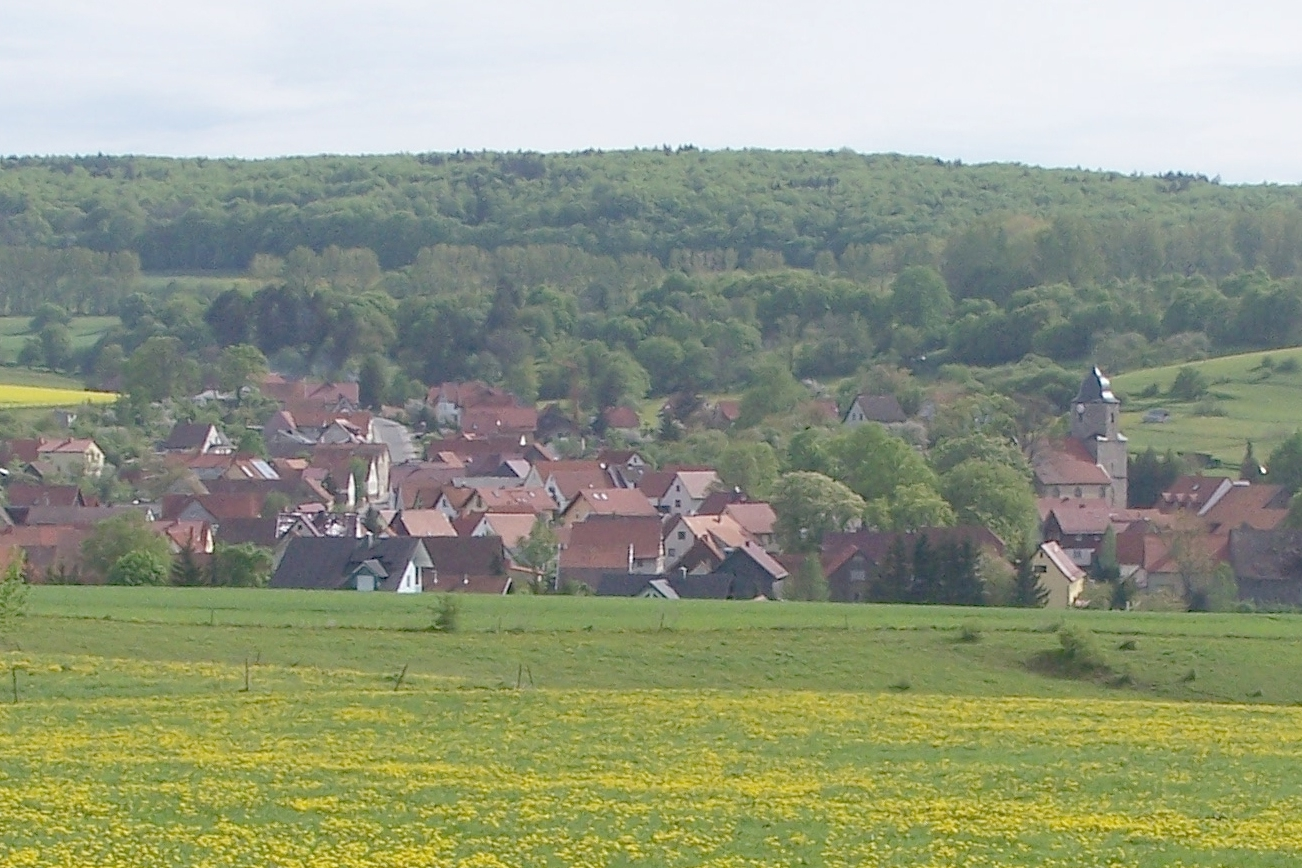
- Interactive map of Kaltenlengsfeld
- Location within Germany Location within Thuringia
- Coordinates: 50°39′N 10°12′E
- Country: Germany
- State: Thuringia
- District: Schmalkalden-Meiningen
- Town: Kaltennordheim

Area
  - Total: 9.73 km^{2} (3.76 sq mi)
- Elevation: 535 m (1,755 ft)

Population (2012-12-31)
  - Total: 416
  - Density: 42.8/km^{2} (111/sq mi)
- Time zone: UTC+01:00 (CET)
  - Summer (DST): UTC+02:00 (CEST)
- Postal codes: 36452
- Dialling codes: 036966
- Vehicle registration: SM
- Website: www.kaltenlengsfeld.de

Kaltenlengsfeld (German pronunciation: [ˌkaltn̩ˈlɛŋsfɛlt]) is a village and a former municipality in the Schmalkalden-Meiningen district of Thuringia, Germany. Since 31 December 2013, it is part of the town Kaltennordheim.
