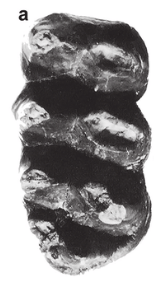
- Occlusal view of the third lower molar (m3) of E. morotoensis

Scientific classification
- Kingdom: Animalia
- Phylum: Chordata
- Class: Mammalia
- Order: Proboscidea
- Family: †Mammutidae
- Genus: †Eozygodon; Tassy & Pickford, 1983
- Species: †E. morotoensis

Binomial name
- †Eozygodon morotoensis Tassy & Pickford, 1983

= Eozygodon =

Eozygodon Temporal range: Early Miocene ~23–16 Ma

Extinct genus of mammal

Eozygodon ( "dawn yoke-tooth") is an extinct genus of proboscidean in the family Mammutidae. It is a monotypic genus that contains the single species E. morotoensis, named in 1983. It is known from the Early Miocene of Africa (Kenya, Uganda, Namibia) and well as possibly the Middle Miocene of China. It is considered a primitive member of the family, retaining a long lower jaw (longirostrine) with lower tusks. The upper tusks are small, and are only slightly divergent from each other. The skull of the young adult (around 24-26 years old in African elephant tooth wear equivalent years) AM 02 from Auchas, Namibia, was around the size of that of a 10 year old American mastodon, around 60 centimetres (2.0 ft) in maximum length. Some authors suggest that Eozygodon could be less closely related to other members of Mammutidae than other mammutids are to Elephantida, making Mammutidae as typically defined paraphyletic.

== Palaeoecology ==
Dental mesowear from East African specimens suggests a browsing diet. δ^{13}C_{enamel} values in E. morotoensis from Moroto were very high.
