= Kaltennordheim =

- Town
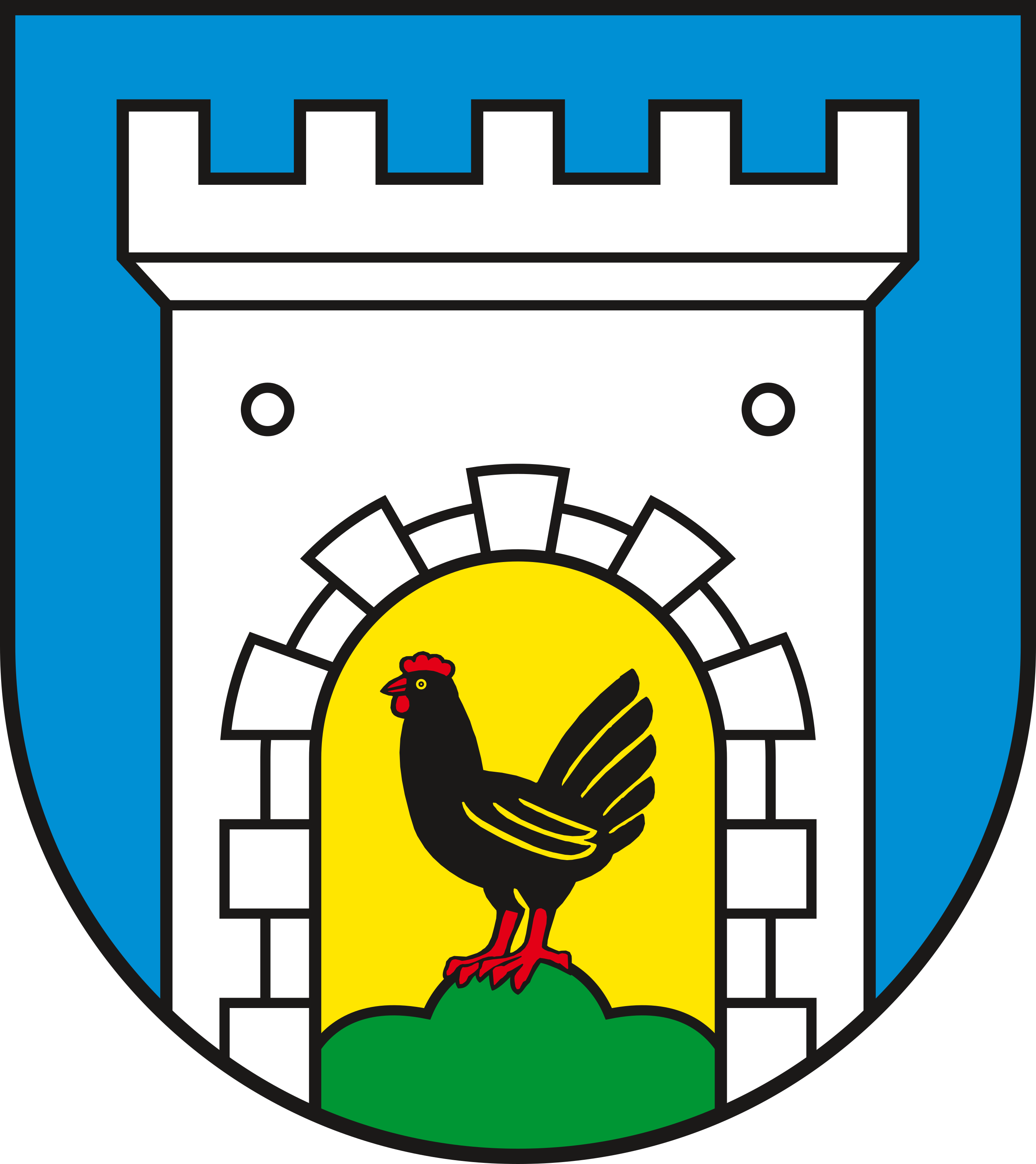
- Coat of arms

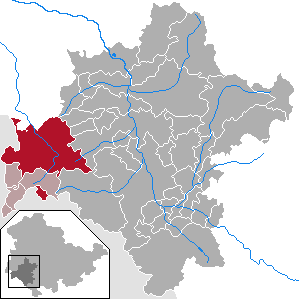
- Location of Kaltennordheim within Schmalkalden-Meiningen district
- Interactive map of Kaltennordheim
- Location within Germany Location within Thuringia
- Coordinates: 50°38′N 10°10′E
- Country: Germany
- State: Thuringia
- District: Schmalkalden-Meiningen
- Municipal assoc.: Hohe Rhön

Government
  - Mayor (2020–26): Erik Thürmer (CDU)

Area
  - Total: 94.41 km^{2} (36.45 sq mi)
- Elevation: 440 m (1,440 ft)

Population (2025-12-31)
  - Total: 5,562
  - Density: 58.91/km^{2} (152.6/sq mi)
- Time zone: UTC+01:00 (CET)
  - Summer (DST): UTC+02:00 (CEST)
- Postal codes: 36452
- Dialling codes: 036966
- Vehicle registration: SM

Kaltennordheim (German: [ˌkaltn̩ˈnɔʁthaɪm]) is a town in the Schmalkalden-Meiningen district, in Thuringia, Germany. It is situated in the Rhön Mountains, 22 km southwest of Bad Salzungen, and 35 km east of Fulda. The former municipalities Aschenhausen, Kaltensundheim, Kaltenwestheim, Melpers, Oberkatz und Unterweid were merged into Kaltennordheim in January 2019. At the same time, Kaltennordheim passed from the Wartburgkreis to Schmalkalden-Meiningen.

== Origin of the name ==
The location was named "Nordheim im Tullifeld" in the middle ages. The prefix "Kalten-" first appeared in the 14th century, likely in reference to the relatively harsh weather in the region which can be attributed to its position south of the Neuberg Dermbach mountain range. Three other nearby towns bear the same prefix: Kaltensundheim, Kaltenlengsfeld and Kaltenwestheim. The prefix also differentiates Kaltennordheim from other towns like Nordheim vor der Rhön.

== History ==
Within the German Empire (1871–1918), Kaltennordheim was part of the Grand Duchy of Saxe-Weimar-Eisenach.

== Notable people ==
- Willy Merkl
- Fritz Röll
