= Gera =

City in Thuringia, Germany

- Town
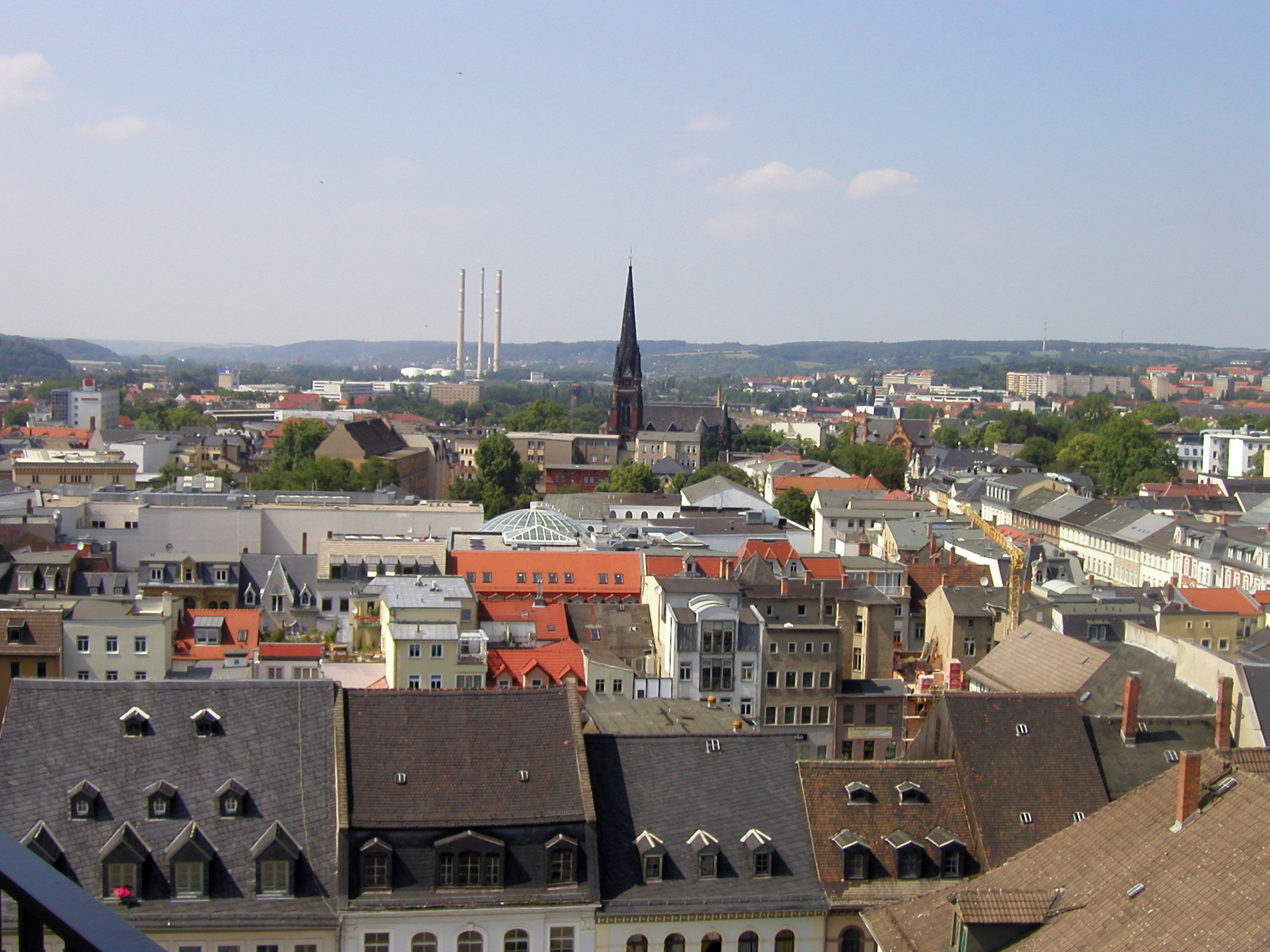
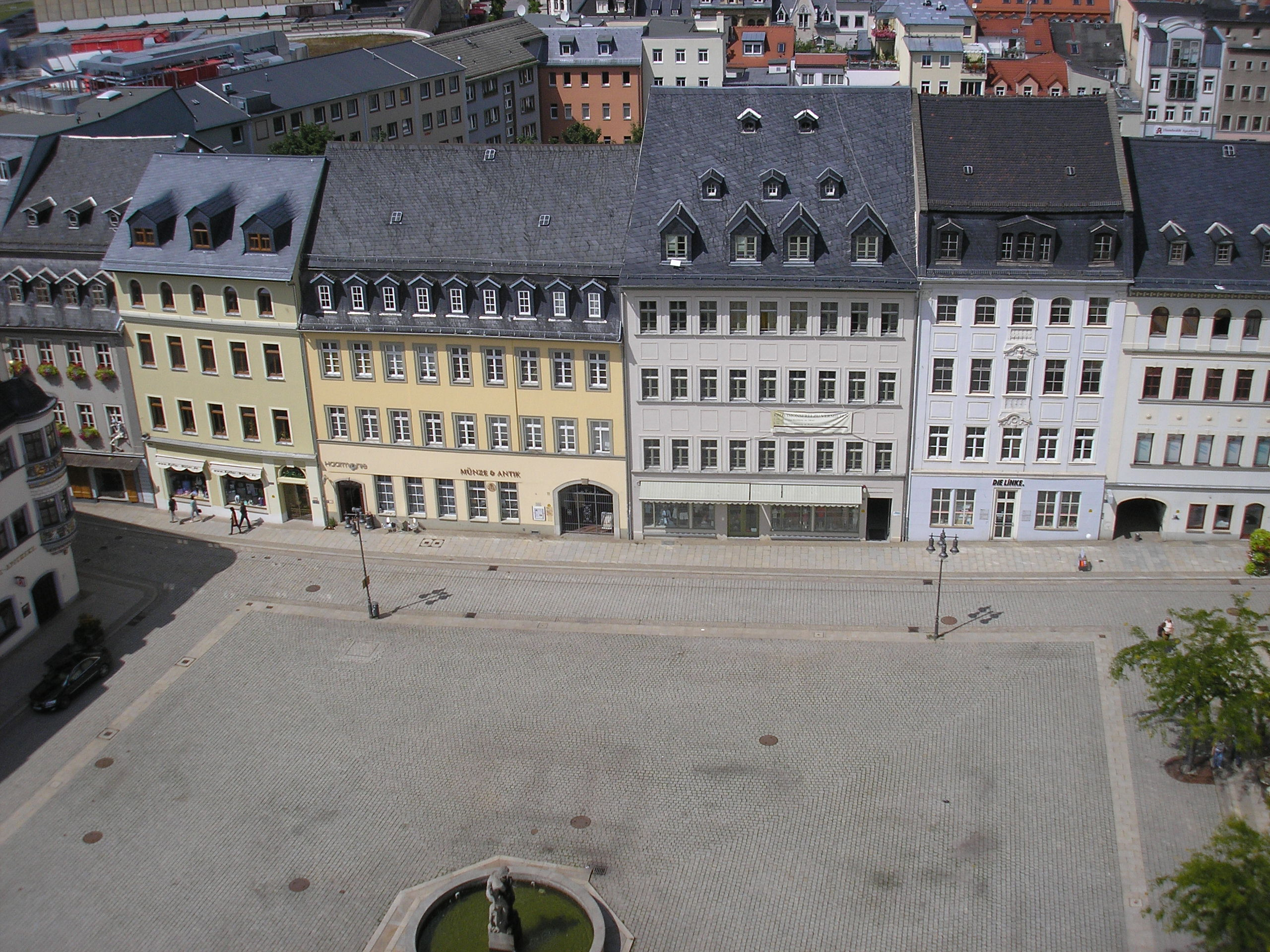
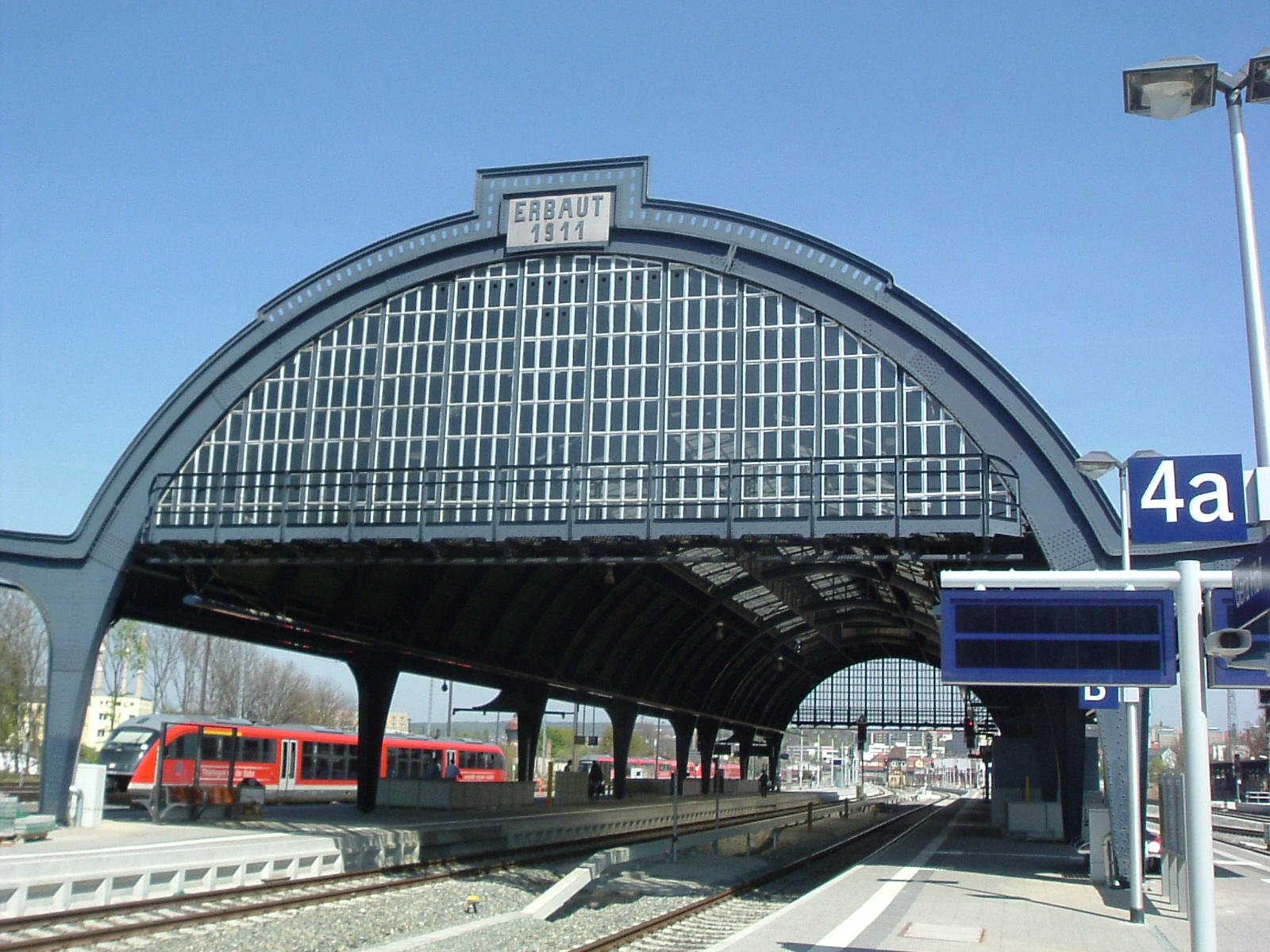
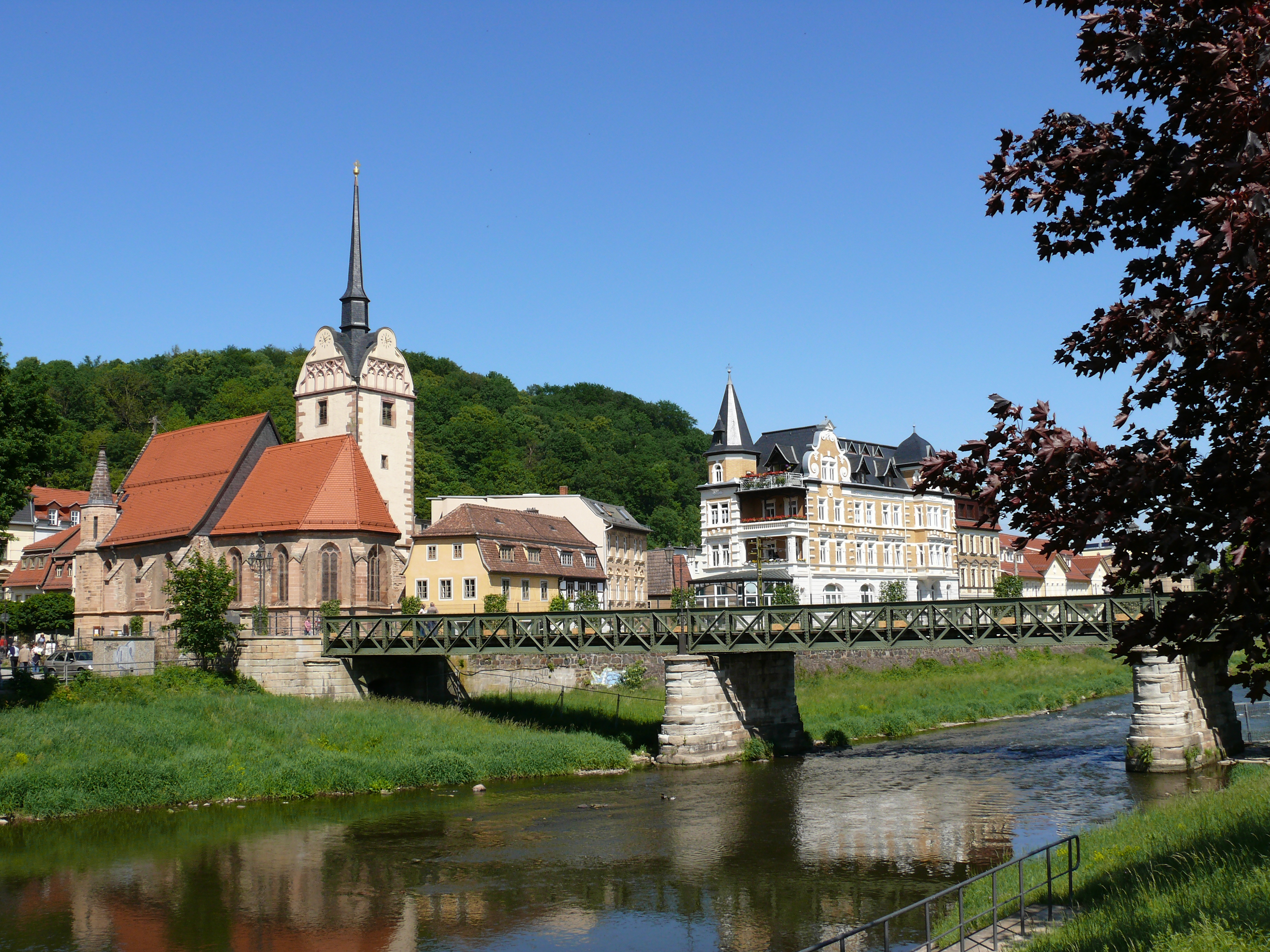
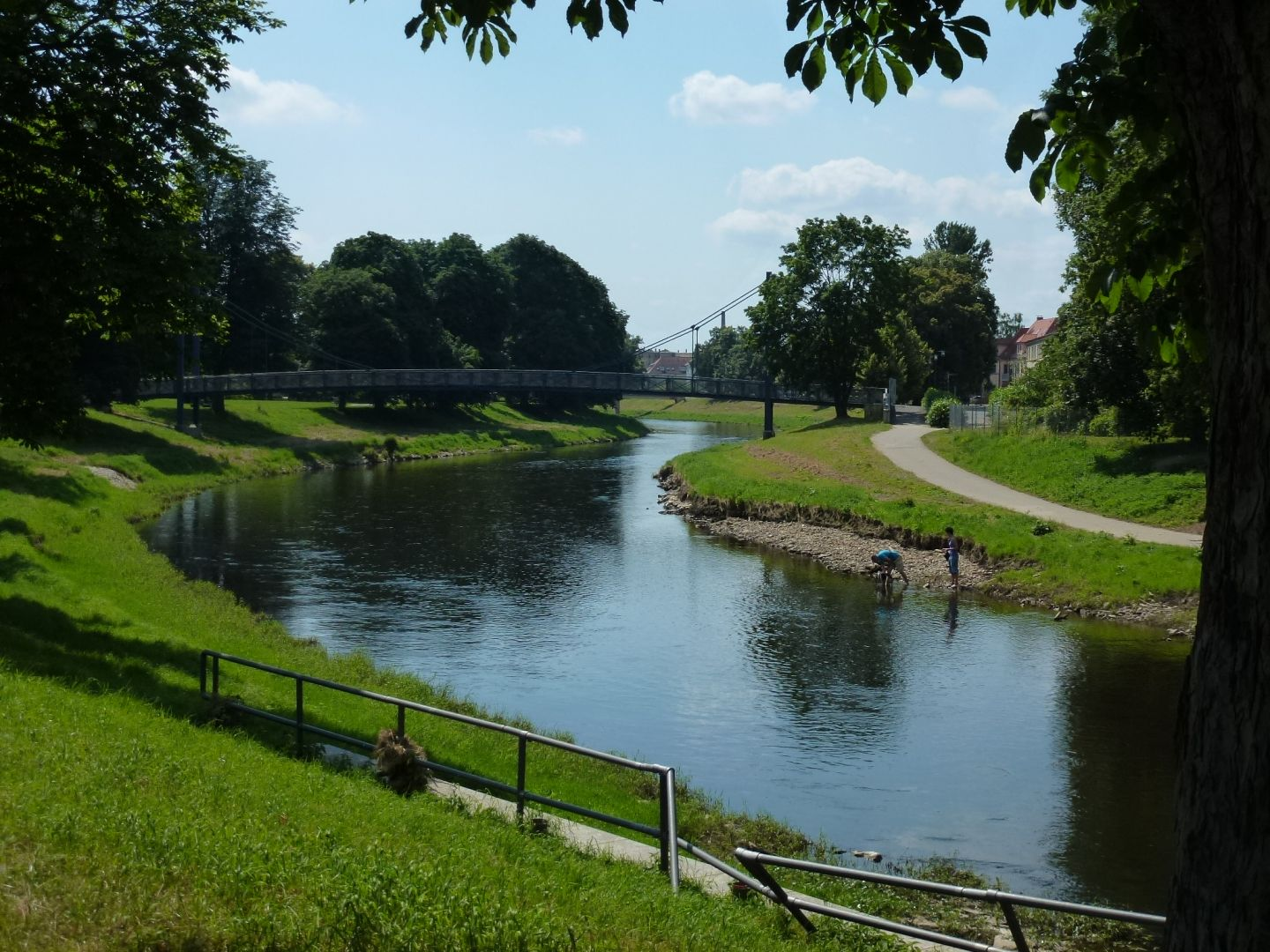
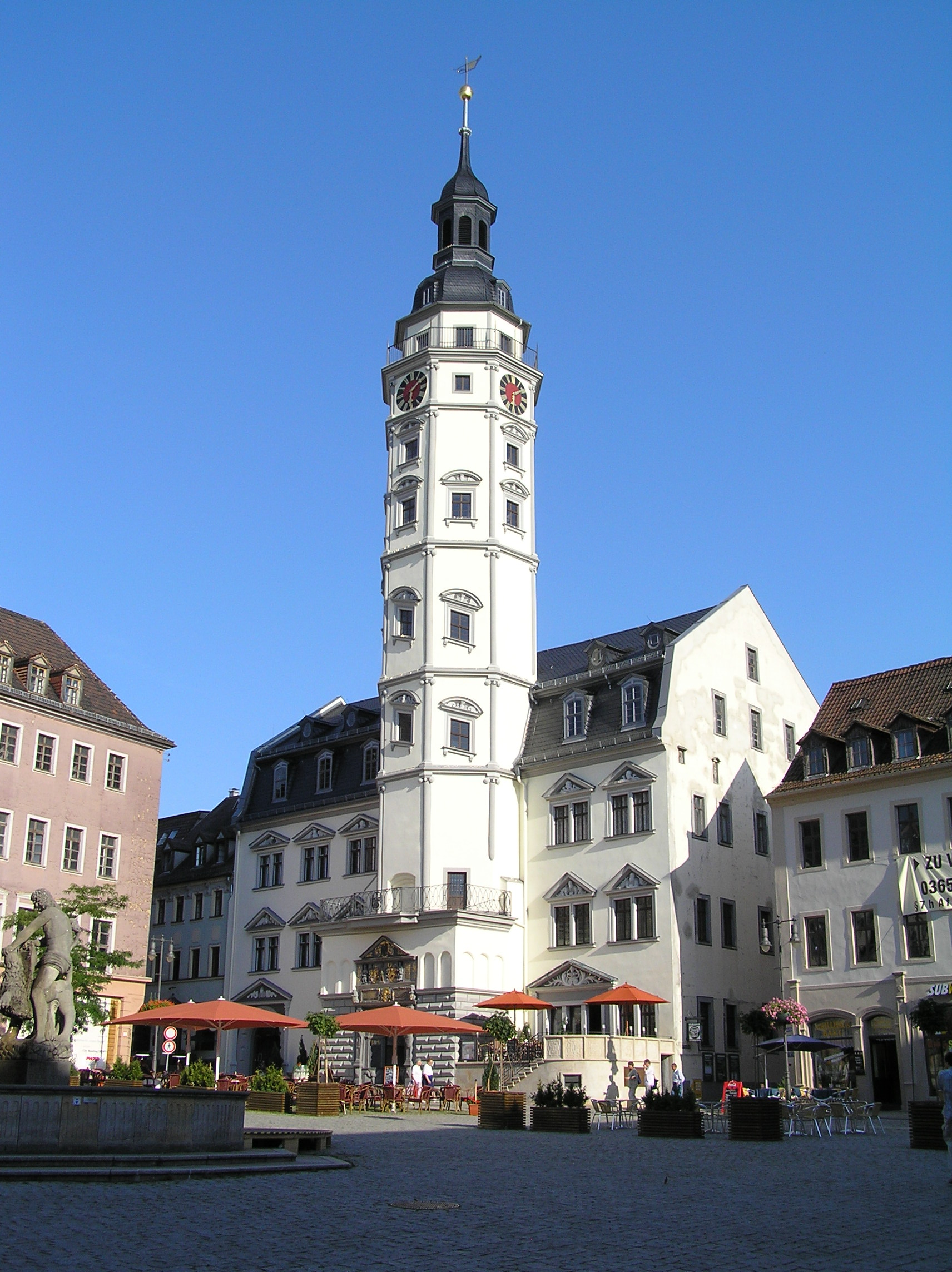
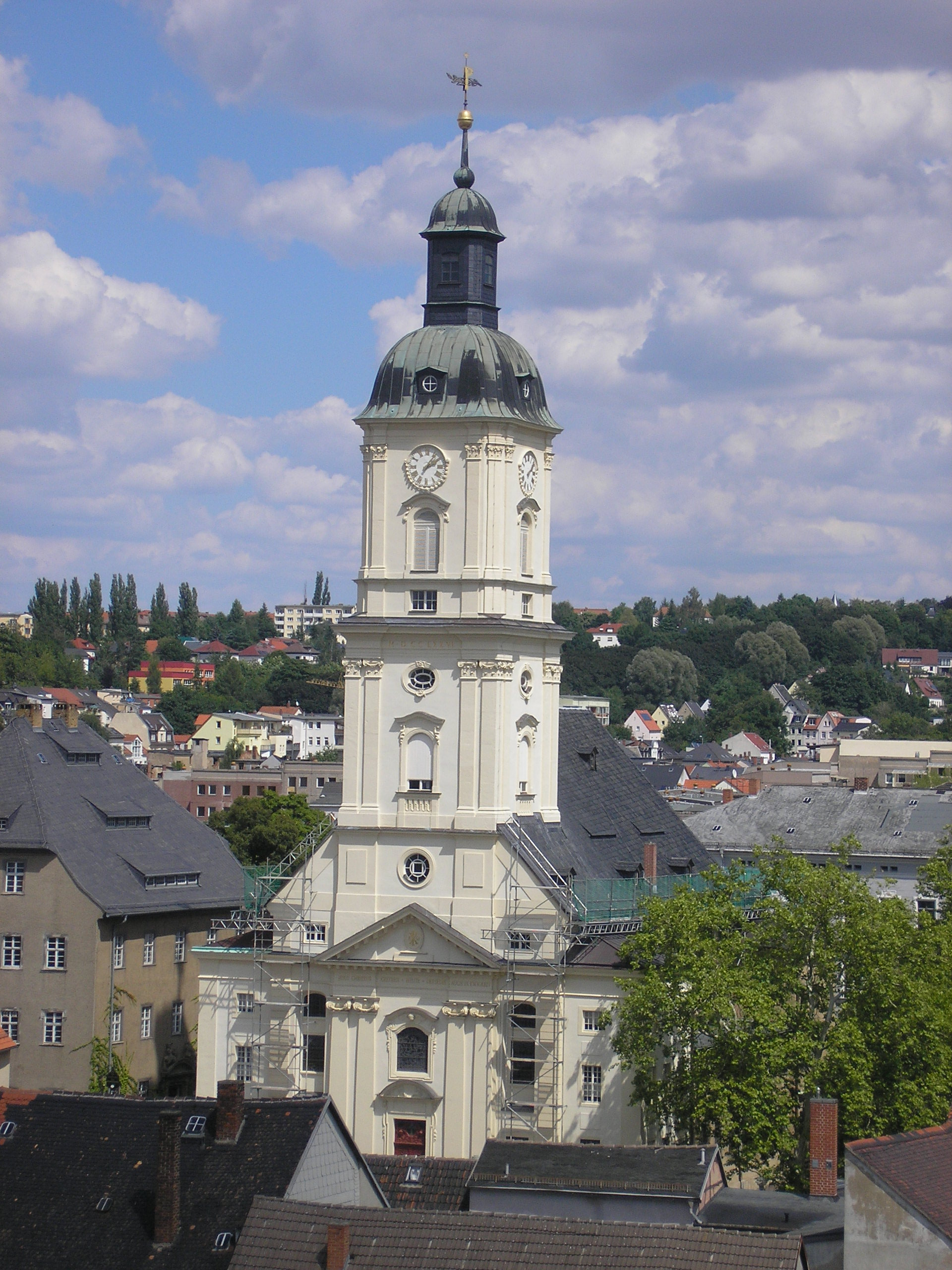
- Clockwise from top: View over the city, Gera Central Station, Textima Footbridge crossing the White Elster, Salvator Church, town hall, view of Gera-Untermhaus with St Mary's Church, market square

- Flag Coat of arms

- Location of Gera within Thuringia
- Interactive map of Gera
- Location within Germany Location within Thuringia
- Coordinates: 50°52′50″N 12°05′00″E
- Country: Germany
- State: Thuringia
- District: Urban district
- First mentioned: 995

Government
  - Mayor (2024–30): Kurt Dannenberg (CDU)

Area
  - Total: 152.19 km^{2} (58.76 sq mi)
- Elevation: 194 m (636 ft)

Population (2025-12-31)
  - Total: 95,608
  - Density: 628.21/km^{2} (1,627.1/sq mi)
- Time zone: UTC+01:00 (CET)
  - Summer (DST): UTC+02:00 (CEST)
- Postal codes: 07545–07557
- Dialling codes: 0365, 0336695
- Vehicle registration: G
- Website: www.gera.de

Gera (German pronunciation: [ˈɡeːʁa]) is a city in the German state of Thuringia. With around 93,000 inhabitants, it is the third-largest city in Thuringia after Erfurt and Jena as well as the easternmost city of the Thüringer Städtekette, an almost straight string of cities consisting of the six largest Thuringian cities from Eisenach in the west, via Gotha, Erfurt, Weimar and Jena to Gera in the east. Gera is the largest city in the Vogtland, and one of its historical capitals along with Plauen, Greiz and Weida. The city lies in the East Thuringian Hill Country, in the wide valley of the White Elster, between Greiz (upstream) and Leipzig (downstream). Gera is located in the Central German Metropolitan Region, approximately 60 kilometres (37 miles) south of Saxony's largest city of Leipzig, 80 km (50 miles) east of Thuringia's capital Erfurt, 120 km (75 miles) west of Saxony's capital Dresden and 90 km (56 miles) north of Bavaria's city of Hof (Saale).

First mentioned in 995 and developing into a city during the 13th century, Gera has historical significance as being one of the main residences of the Ducal House of Reuss and subsequently the capital of the Principality of Reuss-Gera (1848–1918) and of the People's State of Reuss (1918–1920), one of the many microstates the Thuringian region consisted of, before they were unified to form Thuringia in 1920.

Over the 19th century, Gera became a centre of the textile industry and saw a period of rapid growth. In 1952, the city also became an administrative centre in GDR as one of the capitals of Gera administrative district (Bezirk). In 1990, Gera became part of re-established Thuringia. The loss of its administrative functions as well as its industrial core (caused both by structural change among the European textile industry and the economic system change after the German reunification) precipitated the city's slide into an enduring economic crisis.

Since 1990, many of Gera's buildings have been restored and big urban planning programmes like the Bundesgartenschau 2007 were implemented to stimulate Gera's economy. Sights include some retained buildings of the royal residence epoch and many public and private buildings from the economic heyday between 1870 and 1930. The famous painter Otto Dix was born in Gera in 1891.

== History ==
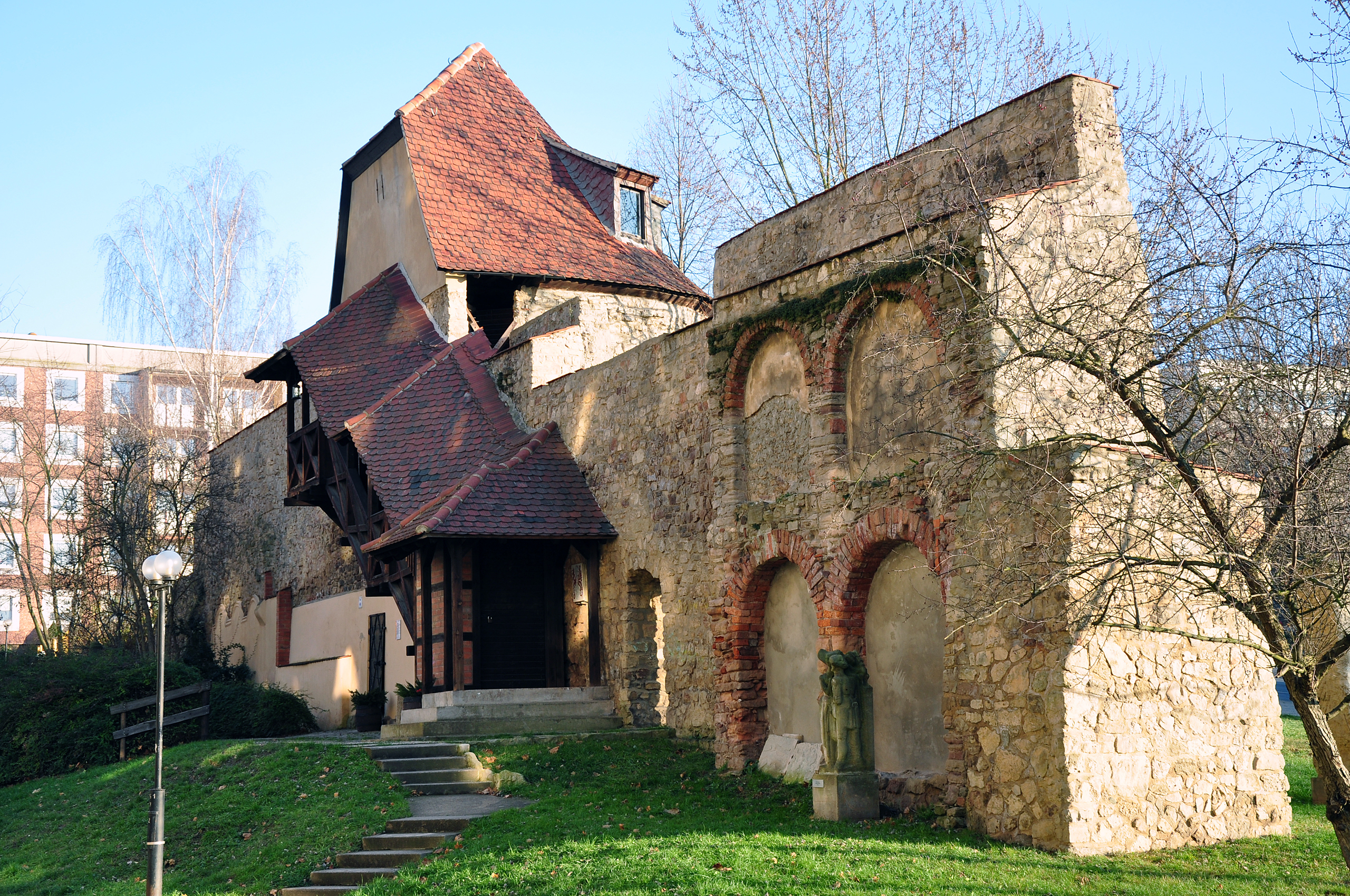
Medieval city wall

=== Middle Ages ===
The place name Gera originally referred to the area of the Elster river valley where the city stands now. The first known documentary mention of Gera dates from 995.

In 999 Emperor Otto III assigned the "province" of Gera to the Quedlinburg Abbey. In turn, the church assigned the protectorship of this area in 1209 to the Vogts of Weida (in German: Vögte von Weida) who served as its administrators. The Vogts of Weida were the ancestors of the Reussians, who ruled Gera until 1918. Gera was first mentioned as a town in 1237, though it is unclear in which year Gera got the municipal law. The small town got circumvallated in the 13th century on an area of 350 x 350 m and the Vogts' city castle was built in the south-western corner at today's Burgstraße. A municipal seal was first used in 1350, the council was first named in 1360 and the town hall was mentioned in 1426. The abbess of Quedlinburg remained the formal sovereign of Gera until 1358, as the Wettins followed her up. The Vogt's couldn't emancipate themselves from Wettin rule. In 1450, Gera was almost totally destroyed during the Saxon Fratricidal War, but it could recuperate quick because the starting textile manufacture brought wealth to the town.

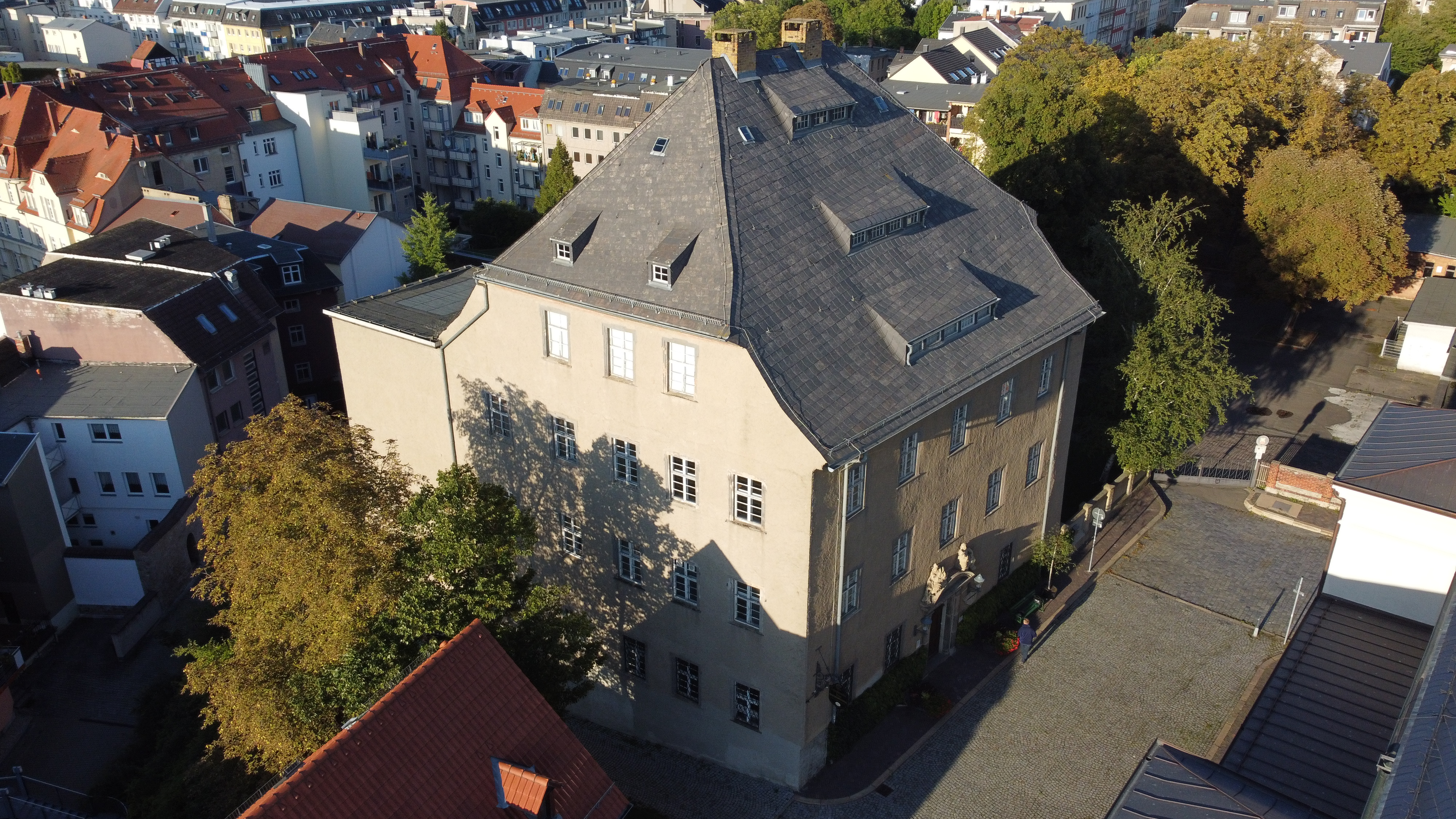
Schreibers' House was the only residential building to survive the town fire of 1780 (aerial view, 2022).

=== Early modern period ===
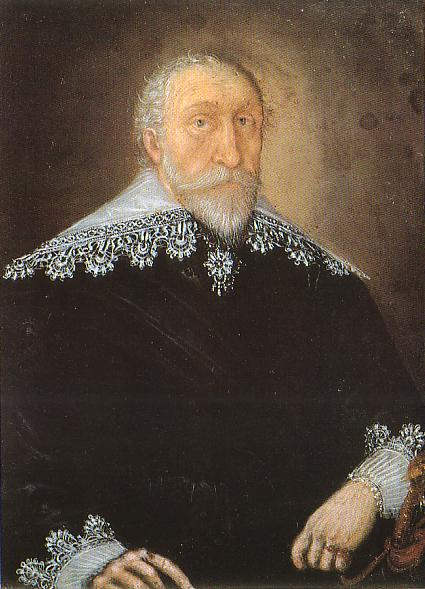
Henry II of Reuss

The Reformation was introduced in Gera in 1533 against the will of the Vogts by the Wettins. After the Schmalkaldic War in 1546, the Wettins lost Gera to the Bohemian Crown, who however had no influence on the city, so that the Vogts or the Reussians (which arose from the Vogts in the mid-16th century) as indeed rulers were strengthened. During the 16th century, some cloth-makers from the Spanish Netherlands migrated to Gera as religious refugees at Count Henry's invitation and raised the textile business in Gera. In the 18th century, there was a first peak in this industry (Putting-out system), which can be seen today at the large agents houses.

In 1673, the Reussians were raised to Imperial Counts which granted them full sovereignty within the Holy Roman Empire; Gera became their royal residence. In 1686 and 1780, big town fires destroyed most buildings in Gera. The town was rebuilt relatively uniform during the 1780s in late-Baroque style, which marks the inner city until today.

In 1806 Napoleon established his Imperial Headquarters at Gera during the War of the Fourth Coalition. From here, on October 12, 1806, the French Emperor purposely sent an arrogant and threatening letter to King Frederick William III of Prussia – a letter that enticed Prussia to war and a crushing defeat at the Battle of Jena a few days later.

=== Since 1815 ===
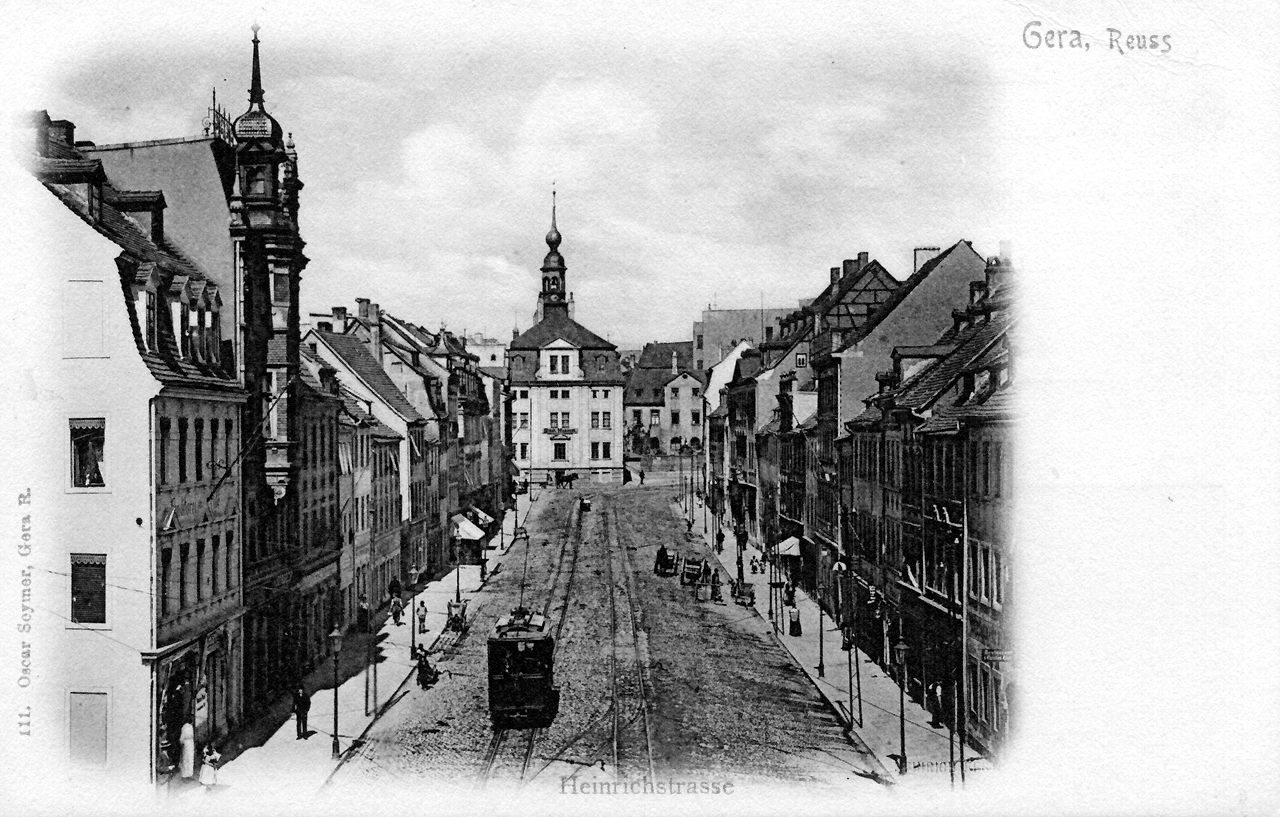
The Heinrichstraße in the 1900s

The Gera line of Reussians died out in 1802, so that it had no royal resident until the new one moved there from Schleiz in 1848. From 1848 to 1918 Gera served as the capital of the Principality of Reuss-Gera. With the industrial revolution in the mid-19th century, Gera grew rapidly, due largely to its textile industry, which saw the first Power loom installed in 1836. In 1859, Gera was first connected by railway to Halle via Zeitz and Weißenfels. During the following decades, rail lines in all directions made Gera to a transport hub, and the town kept growing. The second electric tram in Germany was installed in Gera in 1892.

After World War I, during the German Revolution of 1918–19, the prince of Reuss was forced to abdicate, and the resultant "Republic of Reuss", formed by the union of Reuss-Gera and Reuss-Greiz, became part of the newly founded state of Thuringia in 1920. After the incorporation of some suburbs in the 1910s and 1920s Gera, with some 80,000 inhabitants, was the largest city in Thuringia, although the more centrally located Weimar became its capital.

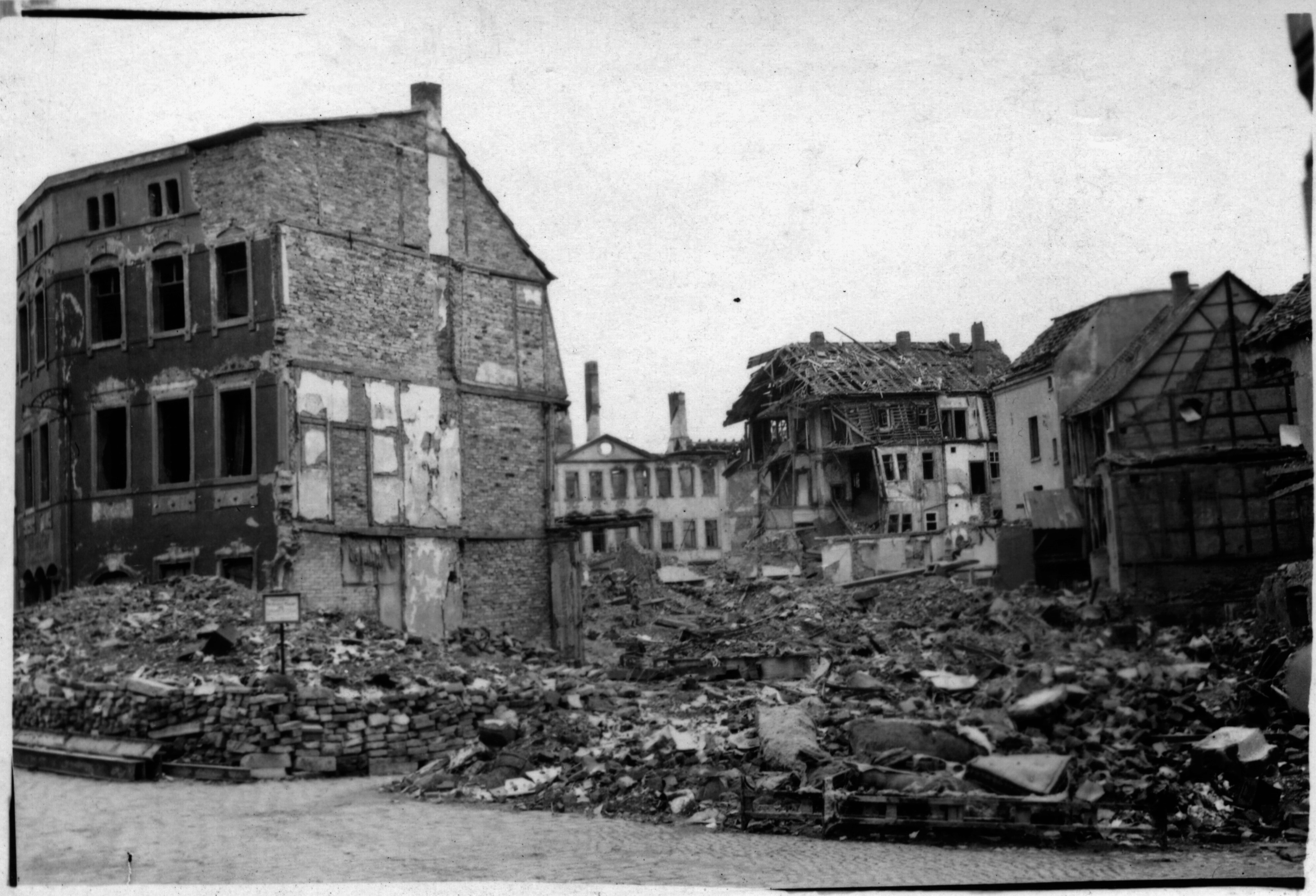
Gera after bombing, 1945

After the Nazi takeover of Germany, the Jewish community of Gera was destroyed, the synagogue burnt down in the Kristallnacht in 1938 and the city's Jews emigrated or were murdered in concentration camps. A month before the end of World War II, on 6 April 1945, U.S. bombing destroyed parts of the city and killed 514 residents. Some 300 buildings were hit, including the Osterstein castle and several historic buildings in city centre, many of which weren't rebuilt after the war, so in present-day nearly half of Gera's buildings date back to before World War II. U.S. forces occupied Gera on 14 April 1945 but were replaced by the Soviets on 1 July 1945.

Gera became part of the GDR in 1949 and was a flash point in the Uprising of 1953 in East Germany as thousands of workers – among them many employees of the Soviet-established Wismut uranium mining entity in the nearby Ore Mountains (Erzgebirge) – demanded higher wages and free elections. The demonstrations were put down by Soviet military forces, including armored units.

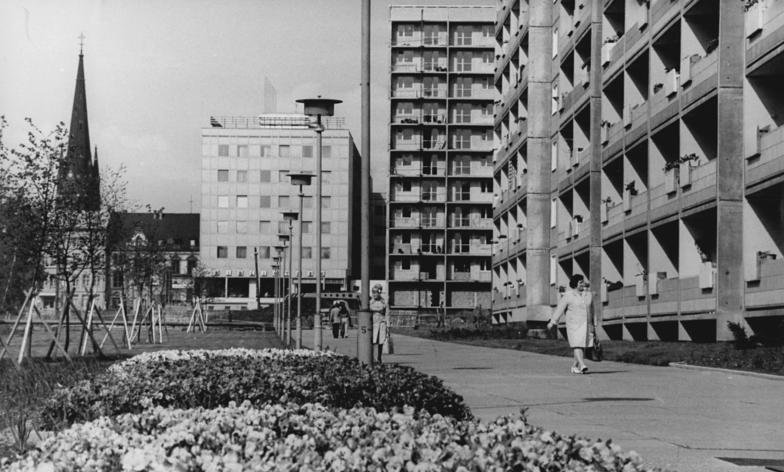
Inner-city Plattenbau architecture in 1974, with St. John's Church in background

With governmental reorganization in East Germany, the city became the capital of the newly created District of Gera in 1952. The population rose during the GDR period, and massive Plattenbau prefabricated apartment blocks, built throughout East Germany, were constructed in Gera.

After German reunification in 1990, Gera became part of the restored state of Thuringia. However, Gera lost most of its administrative functions after reunification, and nearly all the city's factories were closed. This led to a continuing economic crisis with significant unemployment, and the city's population declined from 135,000 in 1990 to less than 100,000 a decade later.

The city hosted the Bundesgartenschau (federal horticultural exhibition) in 2007.

== Geography and demographics ==
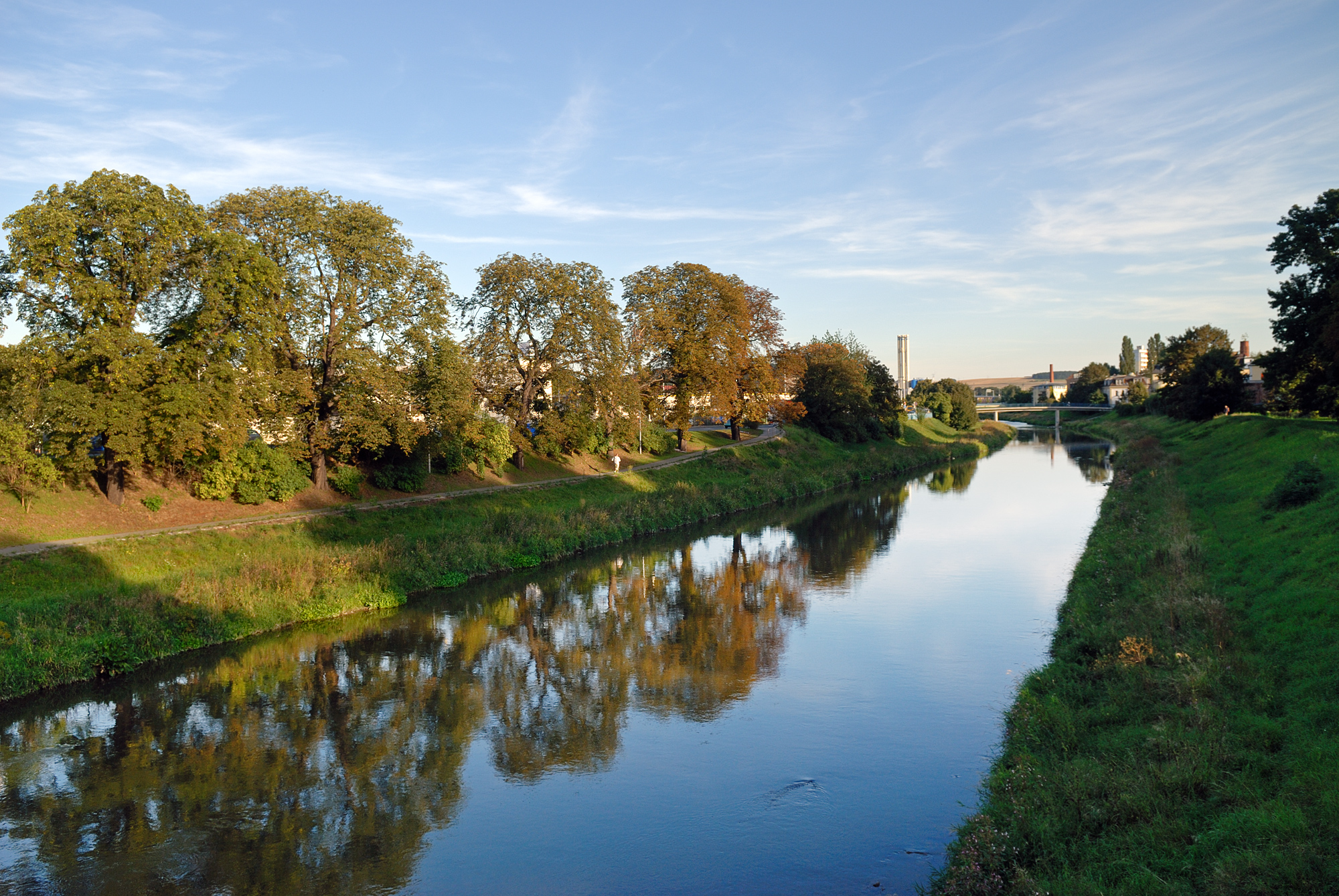
The White Elster river in Gera

=== Topography ===
Gera is located in a smooth-hilly landscape in eastern Thuringia at the White Elster river (progression: Saale→ Elbe→ North Sea), between the Thuringian Highland approx. 50 km (31 mi) in the south-west, the Ore Mountains approx. 50 km (31 mi) in the south-east and the Leipzig Bay approx. 50 km (31 mi) in the north. The municipal territory is marked by the Elster valley, crossing it in south-northern direction. West of the valley, the landscape is more hilly and forested (with the Gera Municipal Forest), whereas the eastern parts are more flat and in agricultural use. The elevation is between 180 metres (the level of the White Elster river) and 354 m (1,161.42 ft) (when measured at Gera-Falka at the furthest southeastern point). Usually the height above sea level for the city appears as 205 m (673 ft) when measured at the market place.

Small tributaries of the White Elster river within the borders of Gera are the Erlbach on the western side and the Wipsenbach, Gessenbach and Brahme on the eastern side.

=== Climate ===
Gera has a humid continental climate (Dfb) or an oceanic climate (Cfb) according to the Köppen climate classification system. Summers are warm and sometimes humid, winters are relatively cold. The city's topography creates a microclimate caused through the basin position with sometimes inversion in winter (quite cold nights under −20 °C (−4 °F)) and heat and inadequate air circulation in summer. Annual precipitation is only 591 millimeters (23.3 in) with moderate rainfall throughout the year. Light snowfall mainly occurs from December through February, but snow cover does not usually remain for long.

Climate data for Gera (1991–2020 normals)
Month	Jan	Feb	Mar	Apr	May	Jun	Jul	Aug	Sep	Oct	Nov	Dec	Year
Record high °C (°F)	15.3 (59.5)	18.9 (66.0)	23.9 (75.0)	29.5 (85.1)	31.5 (88.7)	37.3 (99.1)	37.3 (99.1)	37.5 (99.5)	31.8 (89.2)	28.6 (83.5)	19.2 (66.6)	16.9 (62.4)	37.5 (99.5)
Mean daily maximum °C (°F)	2.8 (37.0)	4.2 (39.6)	8.4 (47.1)	13.9 (57.0)	18.3 (64.9)	21.6 (70.9)	24.2 (75.6)	24.0 (75.2)	19.0 (66.2)	13.4 (56.1)	7.4 (45.3)	3.7 (38.7)	13.4 (56.1)
Daily mean °C (°F)	0.3 (32.5)	1.0 (33.8)	4.3 (39.7)	8.8 (47.8)	13.0 (55.4)	16.3 (61.3)	18.5 (65.3)	18.3 (64.9)	13.9 (57.0)	9.2 (48.6)	4.5 (40.1)	1.3 (34.3)	9.1 (48.4)
Mean daily minimum °C (°F)	−2.4 (27.7)	−2.1 (28.2)	0.5 (32.9)	3.7 (38.7)	7.5 (45.5)	11.0 (51.8)	13.0 (55.4)	13.0 (55.4)	9.4 (48.9)	5.7 (42.3)	1.8 (35.2)	−1.2 (29.8)	5.0 (41.0)
Record low °C (°F)	−26.5 (−15.7)	−25.0 (−13.0)	−20.4 (−4.7)	−8.4 (16.9)	−4.3 (24.3)	0.4 (32.7)	3.6 (38.5)	0.8 (33.4)	−2.1 (28.2)	−7.5 (18.5)	−12.6 (9.3)	−24.8 (−12.6)	−26.5 (−15.7)
Average precipitation mm (inches)	32.5 (1.28)	27.6 (1.09)	38.6 (1.52)	32.3 (1.27)	56.8 (2.24)	67.7 (2.67)	80.5 (3.17)	67.4 (2.65)	60.1 (2.37)	43.8 (1.72)	45.7 (1.80)	39.9 (1.57)	592.8 (23.34)
Average precipitation days (≥ 1.0 mm)	15.5	13.9	16.0	11.7	14.0	13.9	14.7	13.6	12.2	14.0	15.1	15.7	170.3
Average snowy days (≥ 1.0 cm)	12.8	11.2	5.3	0.6	0	0	0	0	0	0.2	2.6	8.3	41
Average relative humidity (%)	84.8	81.6	77.9	71.5	71.8	72.1	69.3	69.8	76.7	82.5	86.5	86.5	77.6
Mean monthly sunshine hours	64.4	81.9	125.2	182.0	213.1	212.7	222.9	212.6	158.6	116.1	65.7	56.0	1,709.2
Source 1: World Meteorological Organization
Source 2: DWD (extremes)

=== Administrative division ===
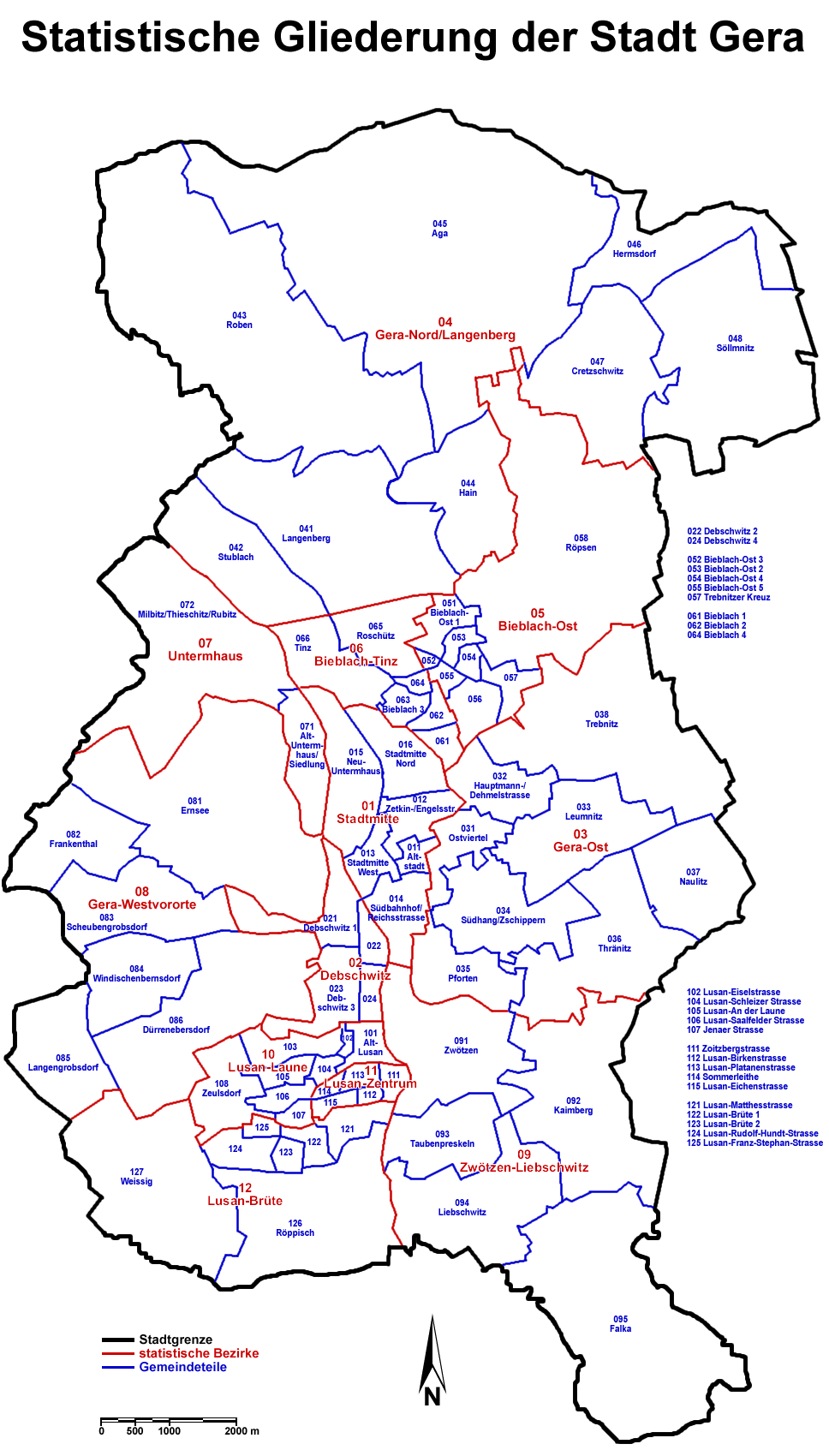
District map

Gera abuts the following municipalities:

- in the Burgenlandkreis district in the north: Wetterzeube and Gutenborn in the federal state of Saxony-Anhalt
- in the Greiz district in the east: Pölzig, Hirschfeld, Brahmenau, Schwaara, Korbußen, Ronneburg, Kauern, Hilbersdorf and Linda; in the south: Endschütz, Wünschendorf, Zedlitz and Hundhaupten; in the west: Saara, Kraftsdorf, Hartmannsdorf and Bad Köstritz
- in the Saale-Holzland district: Silbitz in the north-west.

The 12 statistical districts are:

- 1 – Stadtmitte
- 2 – Debschwitz
- 3 – Gera-Ost
- 4 – Gera-Nord/Langenberg
- 5 – Bieblach-Ost
- 6 – Bieblach/Tinz
- 7 – Untermhaus
- 8 – Gera-Westvororte
- 9 – Zwötzen/Liebschwitz
- 10 – Lusan-Laune
- 11 – Lusan-Zentrum
- 12 – Lusan-Brüte

The main urban quarters are the city centre, Untermhaus (incorporated 1919) in the west, Langenberg (1950), Tinz (1919) and Bieblach (1905) in the north, Leumnitz (1919) in the east, Pforten (1919) and Zwötzen (1919) in the south-east as well as Debschwitz (1912) and Lusan (1919) in the south-west.

=== Demographics ===
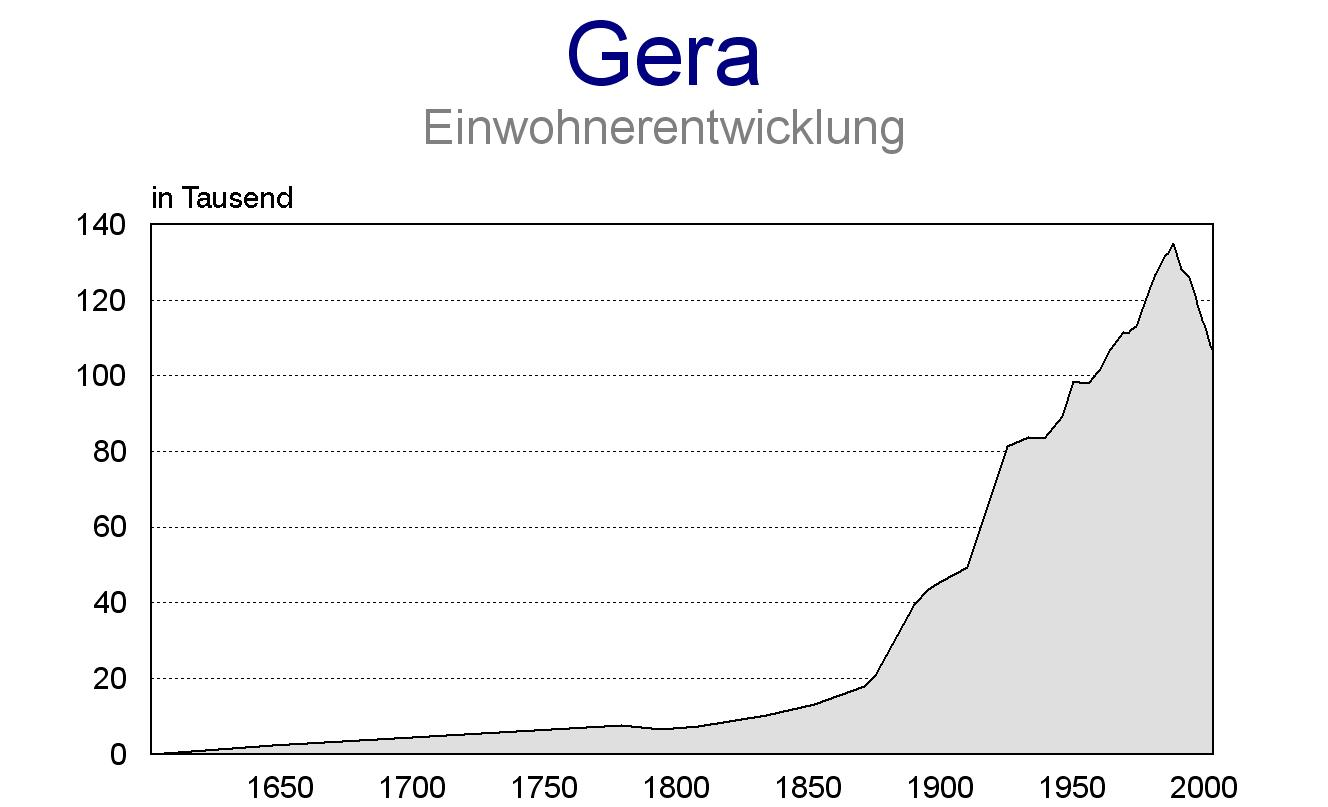
Demographic development until 2003

For centuries, Gera was a small town of about 2,000 inhabitants. As the textile business saw a first peak, the population rose to 7,000 in 1800 and further to 17,000 after the early stage of industrialisation in 1870. Gera's heyday between 1870 and 1930 led to a demographic boom with a population of 83,000 at the end of this phase in 1930. In 1950, Gera had 98,000 inhabitants and the all-time peak was reached in 1988 with a population of 135,000. After the German reunification in 1990, the city saw a significant decline in population, despite the large incorporations of 1994. The population shrunk to 113,000 in 2000 and 95,000 in 2012.

The average decrease of population between 2009 and 2012 was approximately 0.55% p. a, whereas the population in bordering rural regions is shrinking with accelerating tendency. Suburbanization played only a small role in Gera. It occurred after the reunification for a short time in the 1990s, but most of the suburban areas were situated within the administrative city borders. During the 1990s and the 2000s, many inhabitants left Gera to search a better life in west Germany or other major east German cities like Jena or Leipzig. Since 2010, emigration is no big issue anymore. Now, the birth deficit, caused by the high average age of the population, is getting a bigger problem because the immigration isn't sufficient to compensate it yet. Despite urban planning activities to tear down unused flats, vacancy is still a problem with rates around 12% (according to 2011 EU census). A positive side effect for the inhabitants is that Gera has one of the lowest rent levels in Germany.

The birth deficit was 715 in 2012, this is -7.5 per 1,000 inhabitants (Thuringian average: -4.5; national average: -2.4). The net migration rate was +3.6 per 1,000 inhabitants in 2012 (Thuringian average: -0.8; national average: +4.6). The most important regions of origin of Gera migrants are bordering rural areas of Thuringia, Saxony-Anhalt and Saxony as well as foreign countries like Poland, Russia, Ukraine, Hungary, Serbia, Romania and Bulgaria.

Like other eastern German cities, Gera has only a small foreign population: circa 1.6% are non-Germans by citizenship and overall 5.0% are migrants (according to 2011 EU census). Differing from the national average, the biggest groups of migrants in Gera are Russians, Vietnamese people and Ukrainians. During recent years, the economic situation of the city improved a bit: the unemployment rate declined from 22% in 2005 to 11% in 2013, which is still the highest one out of all Thuringian districts. Due to the official atheism in former GDR, most of the population is non-religious. In 2011, 9.8% were members of the Evangelical Church in Central Germany and 2.6% were Catholics, giving Gera one of the lowest shares of religious people in the Western world.

Largest groups of foreign residents
Nationality	Population (31.12.2020)
Syria	1,960
Afghanistan	743
Romania	585
Iraq	358
Russia	272
Poland	203
Bulgaria	187
Somalia	185
Turkey	175
Vietnam	166
Eritrea	157
Serbia	148
Czech Republic	104

== Culture, sights and cityscape ==
=== Museums ===
There are some museums in Gera:

- The Orangerie at Orangerieplatz hosts an exhibition of art from the Middle Ages to the contemporary period.
- The Otto-Dix-Haus (“Otto Dix House”) at Mohrenplatz 4, birthplace and childhood home of the famous artist Otto Dix, has a collection of his drawings, prints, paintings and childhood sketch books, and an exhibition about his life.
- The Museum für Angewandte Kunst (Museum for Applied Arts) at Greizer Straße shows 20th century contemporary art (inside "Ferber House"). It displays collections of Bauhaus ceramics by the artists Otto Lindig und Theodor Bogler; architectural works of Thilo Schoder; and photographs by Aenne Biermann.
- The Museum für Naturkunde (Natural History Museum) at Nicolaiberg hosts a natural history exhibition (inside the "Schreiber House", the oldest building in the city), with its adjacent botanical garden, the Botanischer Garten Gera
- The Stadtmuseum (city museum) at Museumsplatz shows an exhibition of Gera's municipal history.
- The Haus Schulenburg (Schulenburg House) at Straße des Friedens is a factory owner's mansion, built in 1913/14 by the famous architect Henry van de Velde. It hosts topical furniture and decoration and can be visited.

==== Image gallery ====
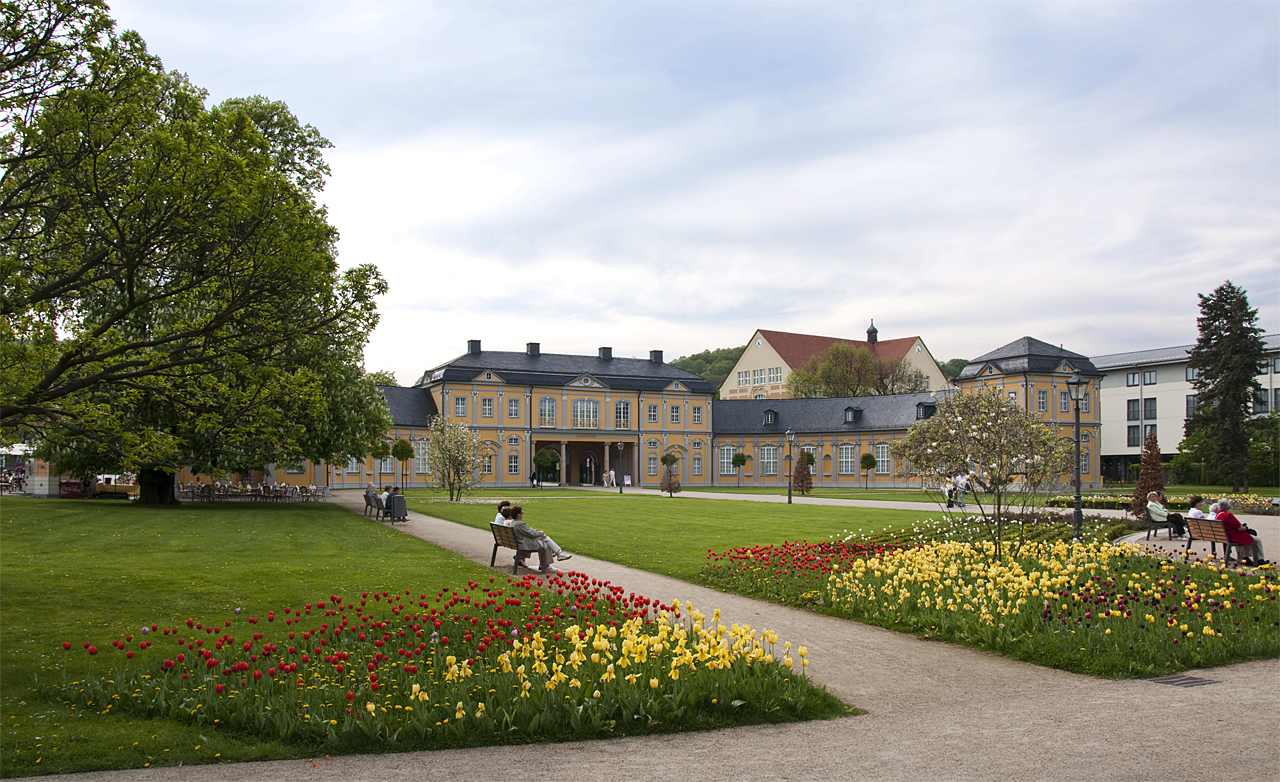
Orangerie

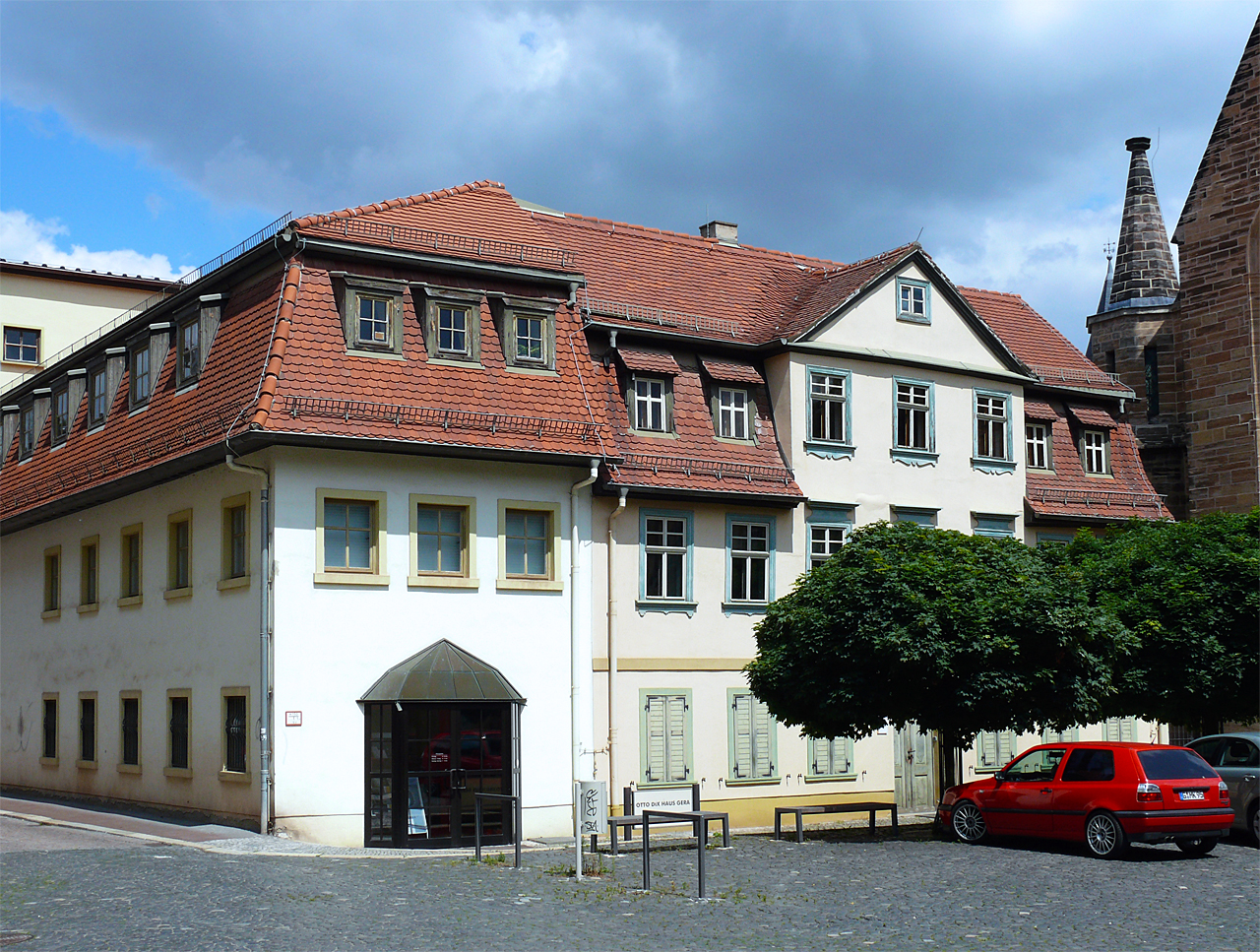
Otto Dix House

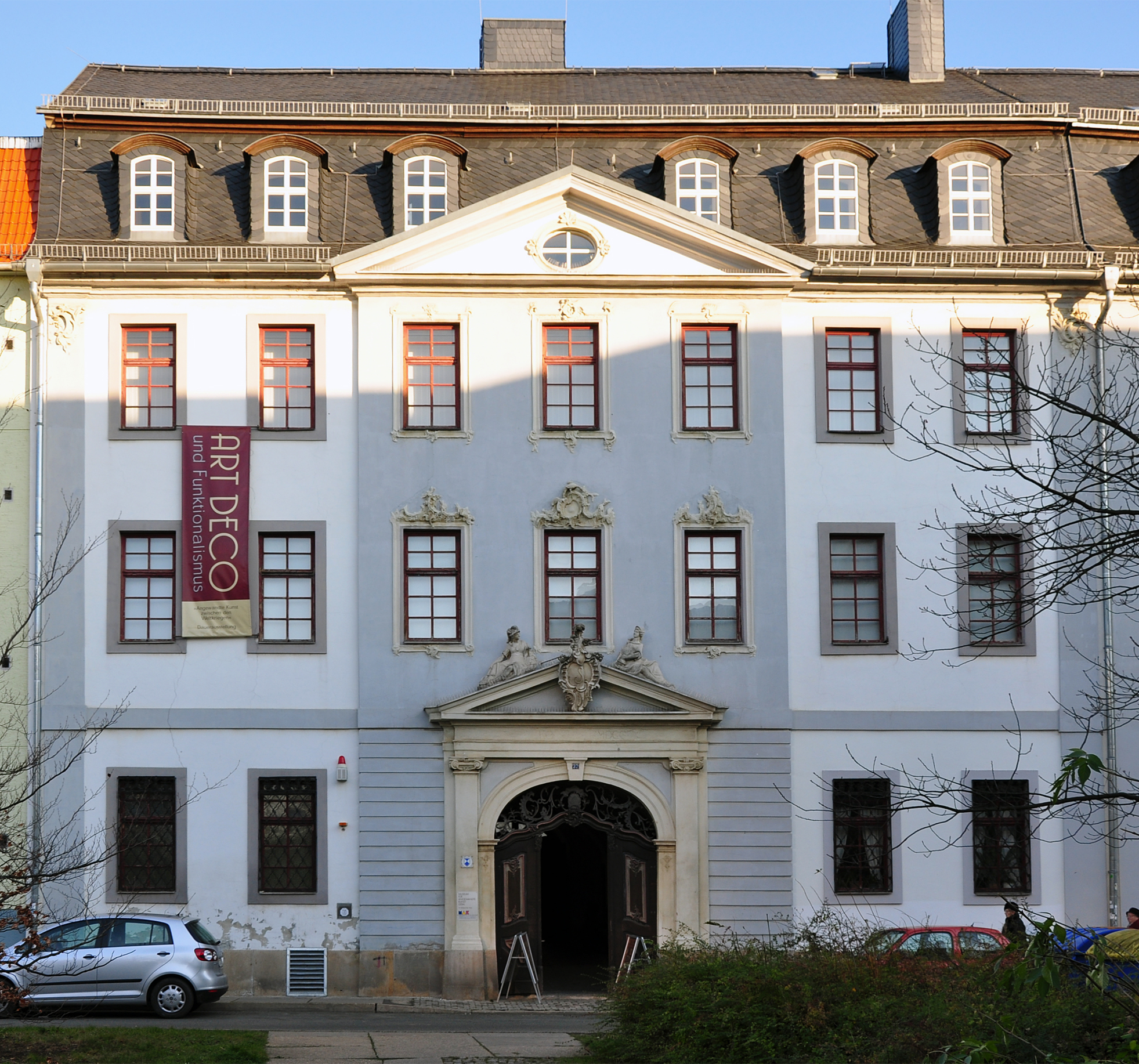
Museum for Applied Arts

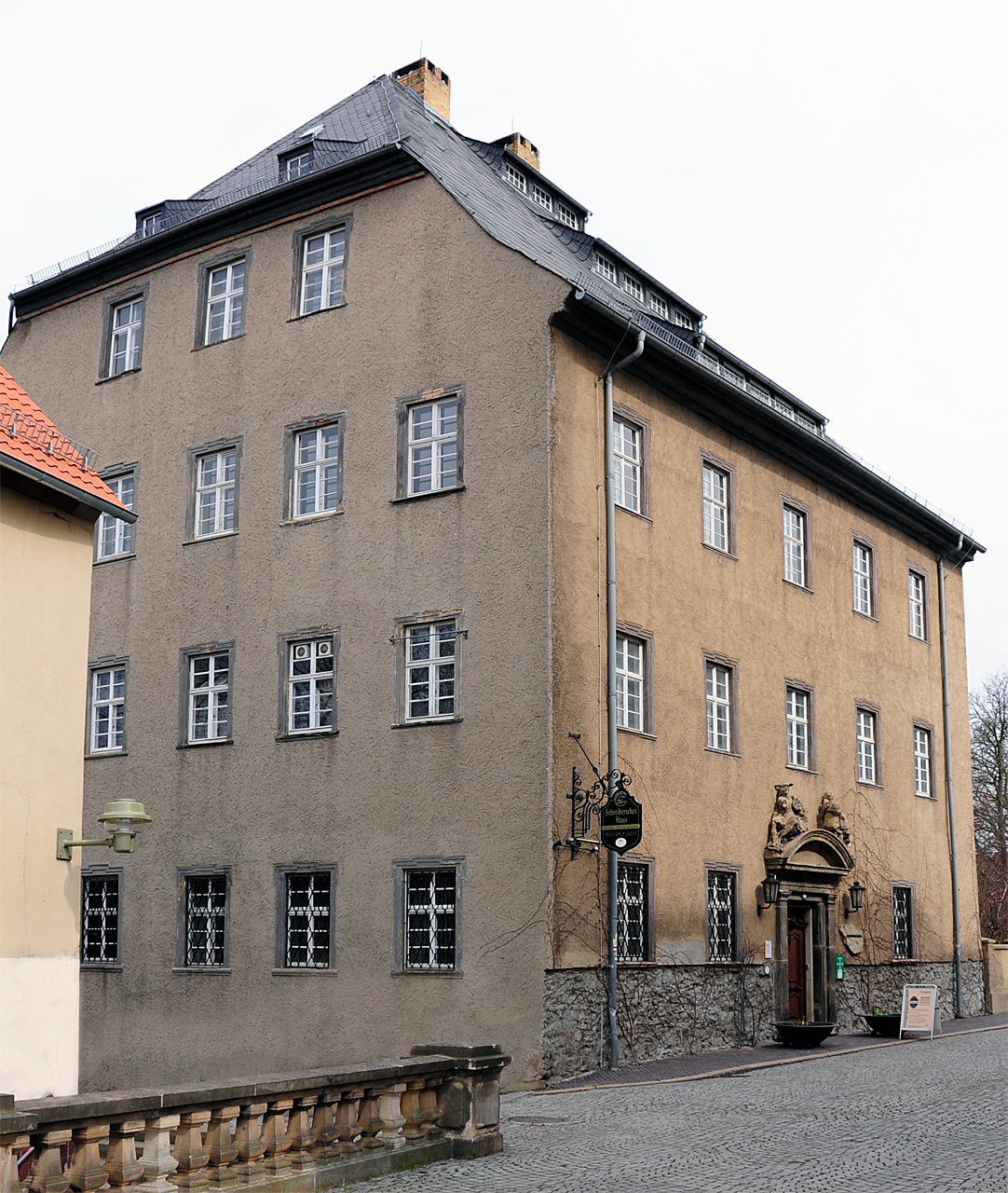
Natural History Museum

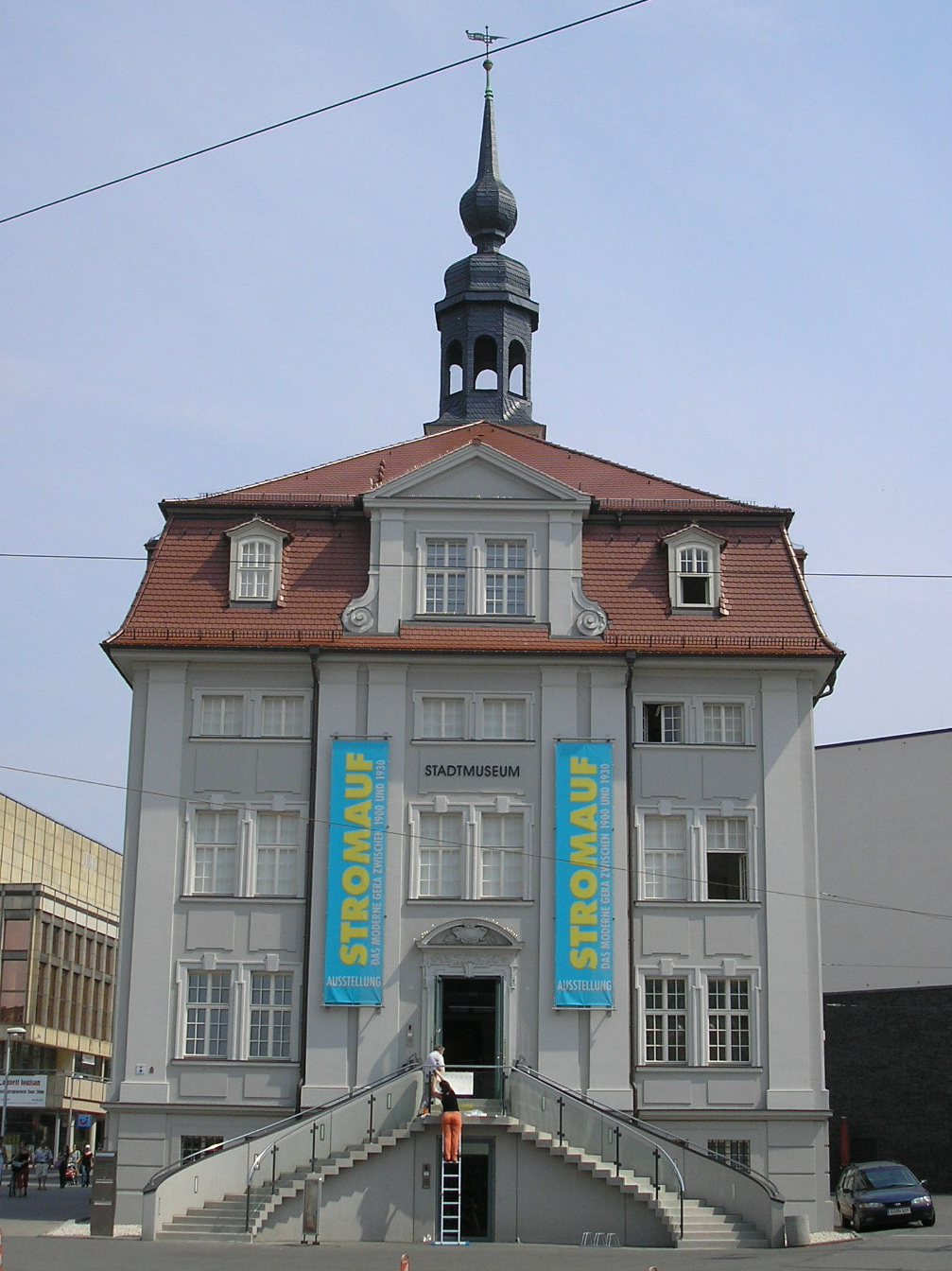
City museum

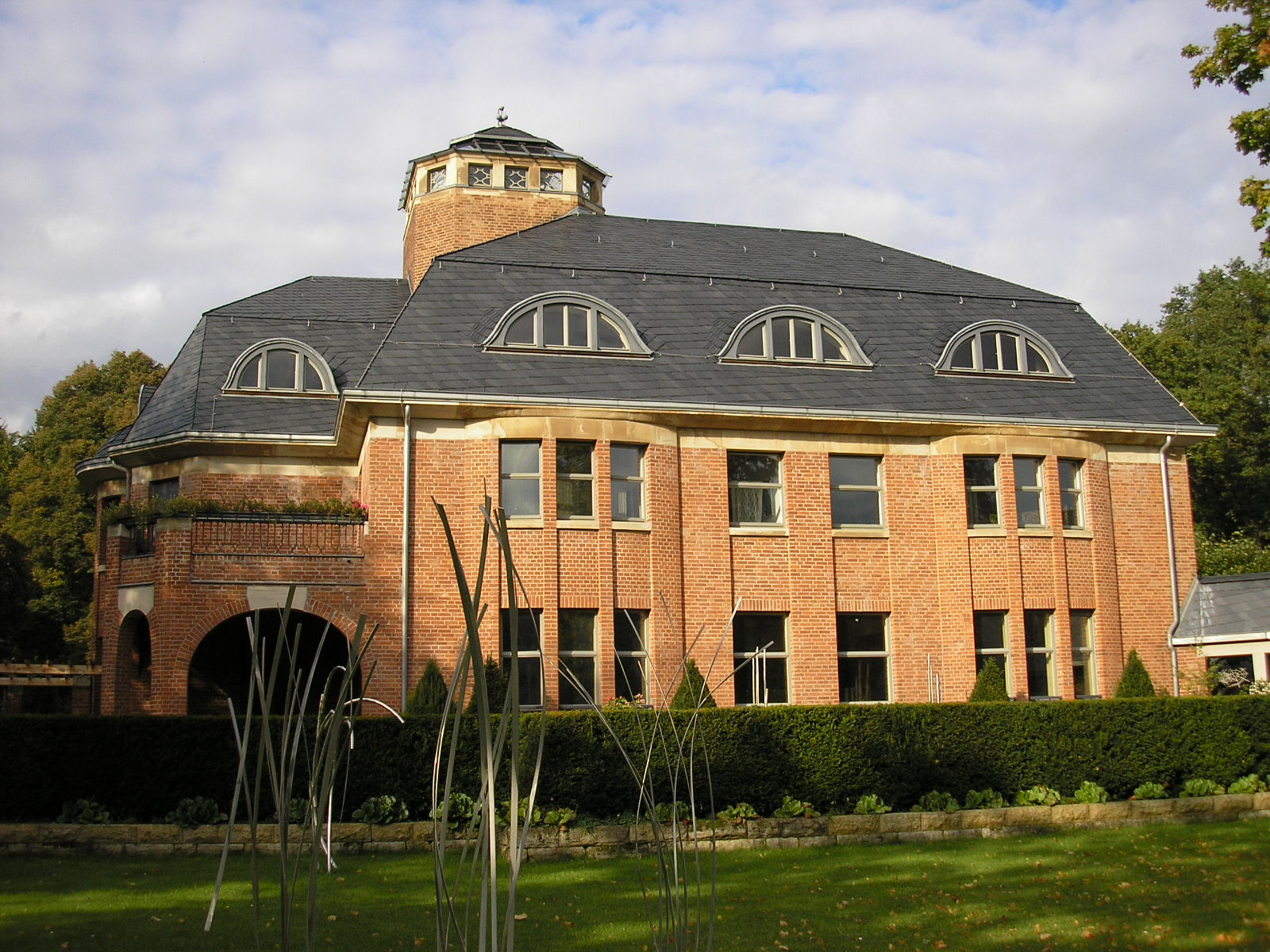
Schulenburg House

=== Cityscape ===
Like its western neighbour-city Jena, Gera is a protracted city along a wide valley in south-northern direction. The historic city centre is quite small and located between Sorge in the north, Nicolaistraße in the east, Stadtgraben in the south and Reichsstraße in the west. It survived World War II, but during the 1960s and 1970s, the GDR government demolished larger inner-city areas to rebuild them with modern concrete architecture, which marks the view of Gera's centre, particularly in the north-west until today. Between 1870 and 1930, the city was largely extended in all directions. As distinct from other German cities, there is no citywide spatial separation between the worker's quarters and the upper-class mansion districts, instead, the mansions and the tenements are situated near to each other, spread over all the districts. The hilly areas and those next to the river and the parks are more upscale, whereas the areas next to the railway and the factories are more working-class styled. Nevertheless, the Gründerzeit architecture is quite diverse and interesting in Gera. Most buildings were extensively refurbished after 1990. Especially Gera's mansion architecture from the 1900s and 1910s is unique. The 1920s brought some modern-style Bauhaus buildings to the then rich city. During the GDR period, urban growth was handled by establishing big Plattenbau settlements on the city's periphery, like the Lusan district in south and the Bieblach district in north. Overall nearly half of Geras buildings date back to World War II.

==== Image gallery ====
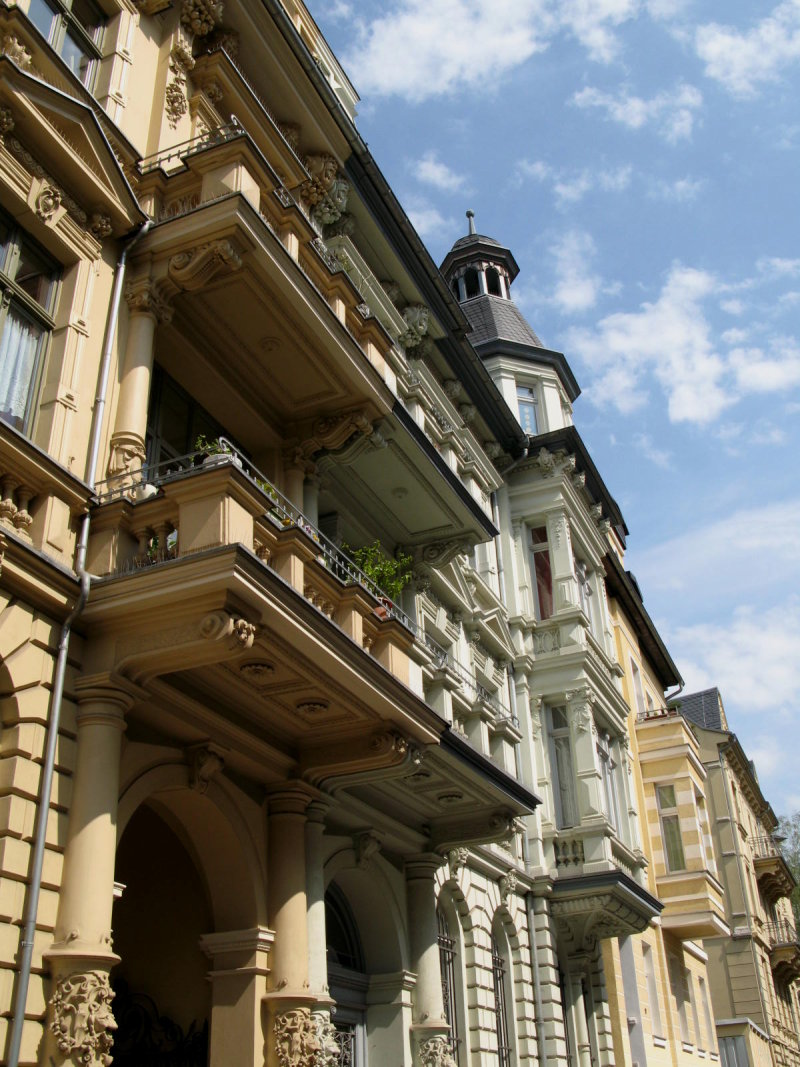
Gründerzeit architecture at Friedrich Engels Street

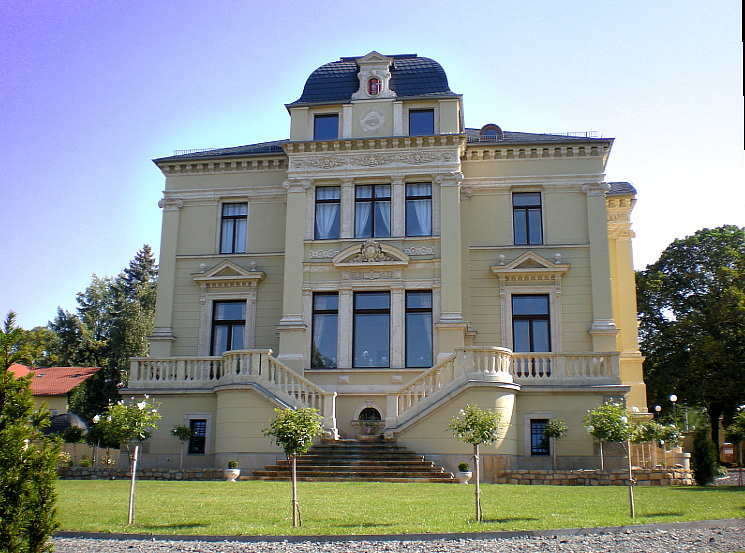
Villa Eichenberg

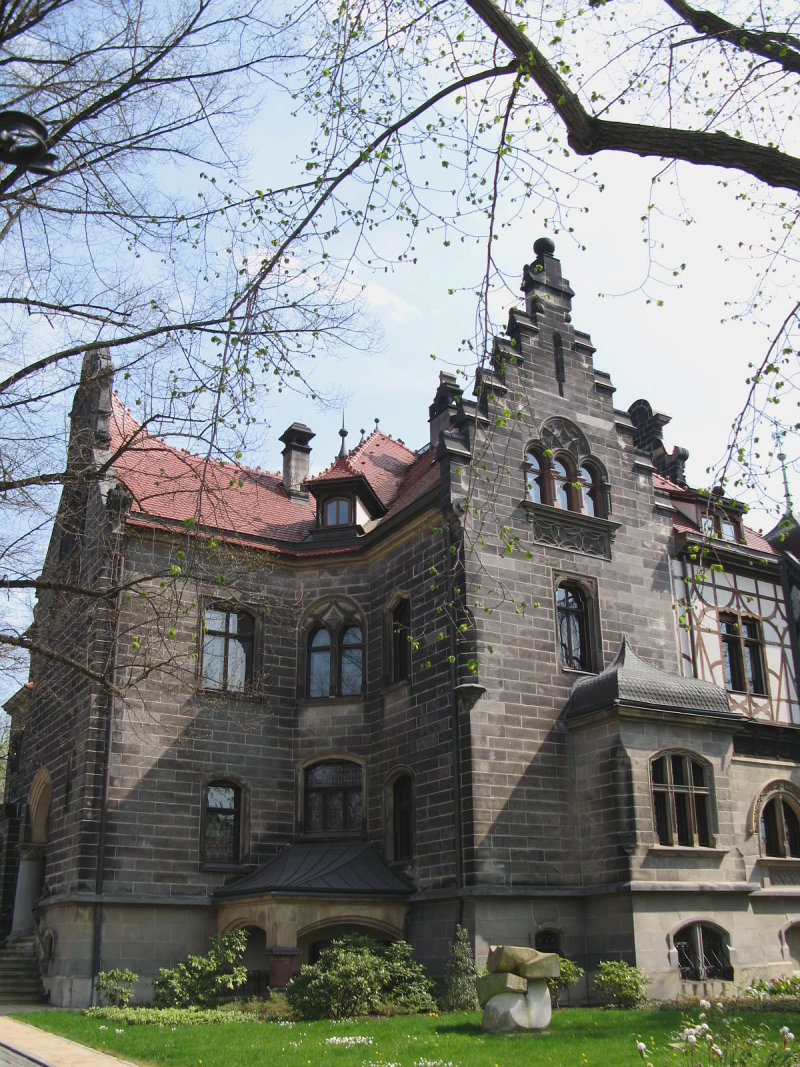
Villa Hirsch

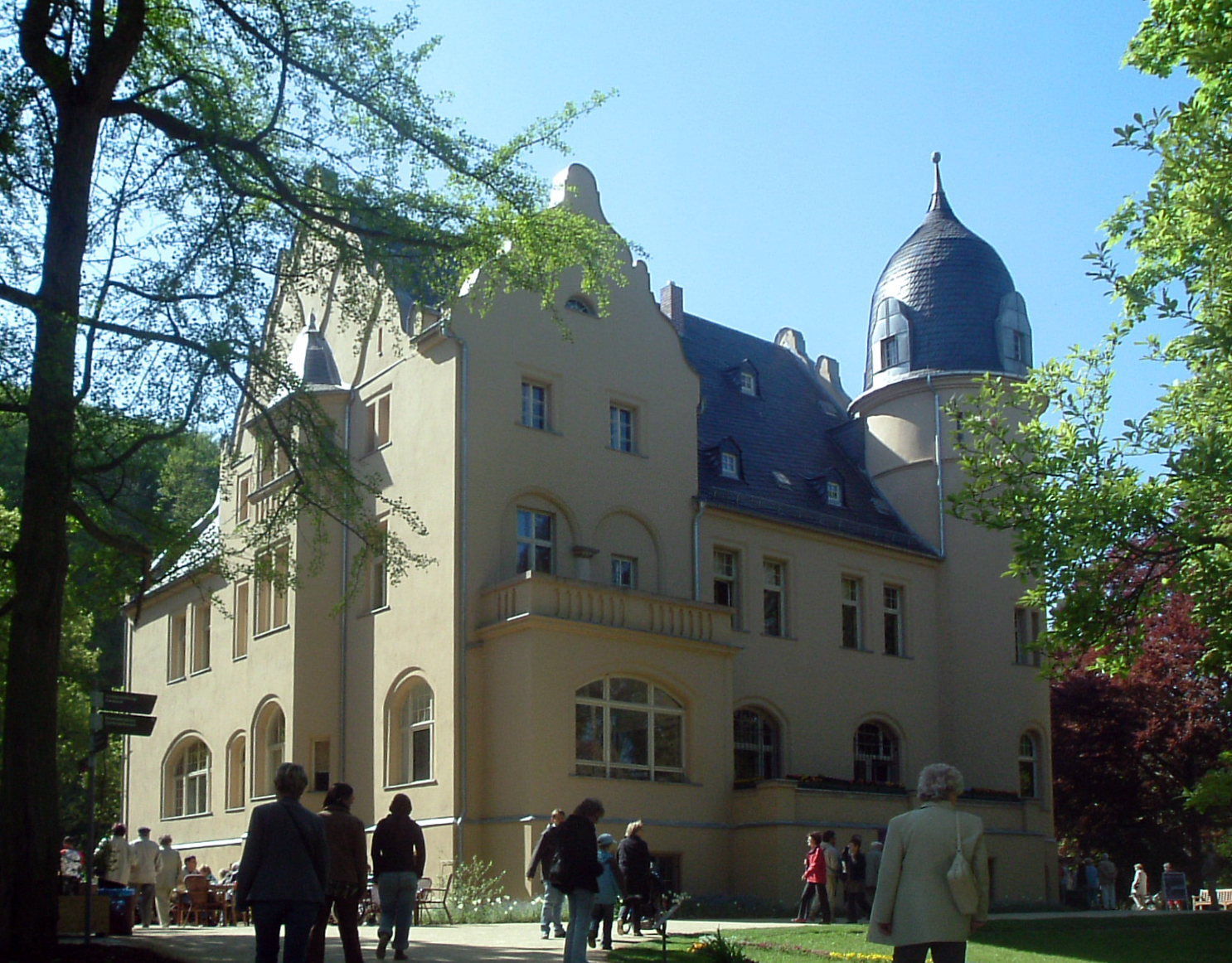
Villa Jahr (1905–1907)

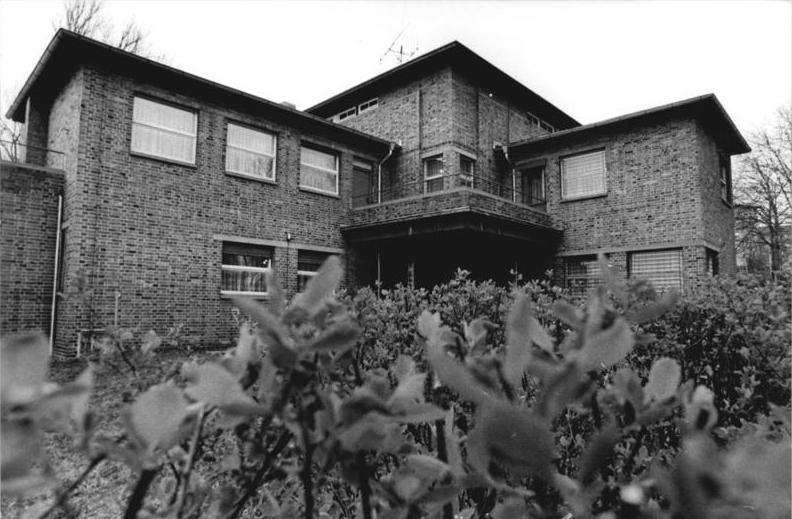
Meyer House (1927)

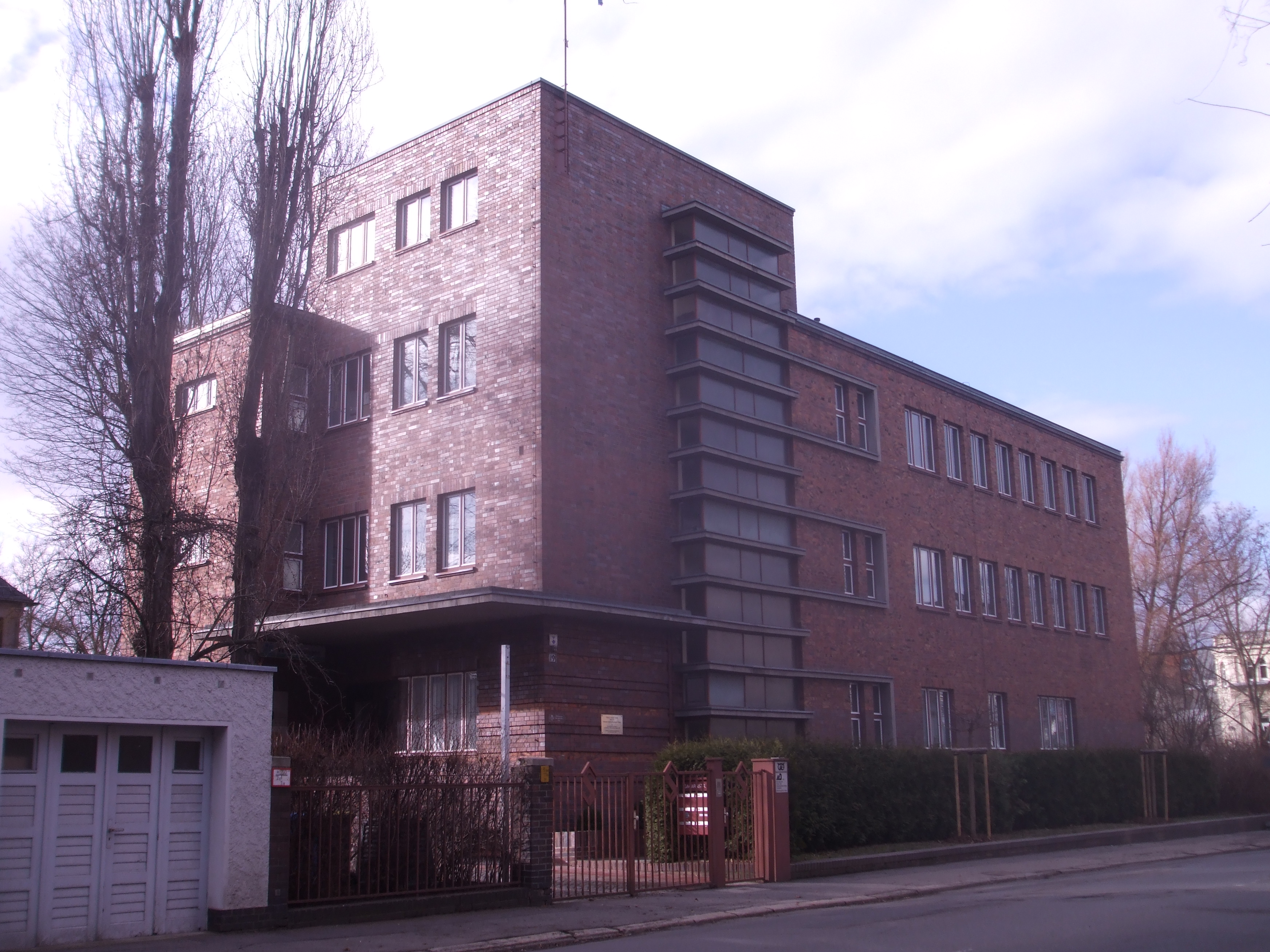
Former Schäfer Hospital, Bauhaus style (1929)

=== Sights and architectural heritage ===
==== Churches ====
- The St. Saviour's Church at Nicolaiberg is the evangelical main church of Gera, built between 1717 and 1720 by David Schatz in Baroque style.
- The Trinity Church at Heinrichstraße is an evangelical parish church (since 1886), built between 1609 and 1611 as cemetery church.
- The St. John's Church at Clara-Zetkin-Straße is an evangelical parish church, built between 1881 and 1885 in neo-Gothic style.
- The St. Mary's Church at Untermhaus district is the evangelical parish church of the former village Untermhaus, built around 1450.
- The St. Elizabeth's Church at Kleiststraße is the catholic parish church of Gera, built in 2000 in modern style as one of only few bigger new churches in Thuringia after 1990.
- The St. Martin's Church at Zwötzen district is an evangelical parish church, built in 1895 in neo-Gothic style.
- The Fourteen Holy Helpers Church at Langenberg district is an evangelical parish church, was rebuilt during the 1750s.

==== Image gallery ====
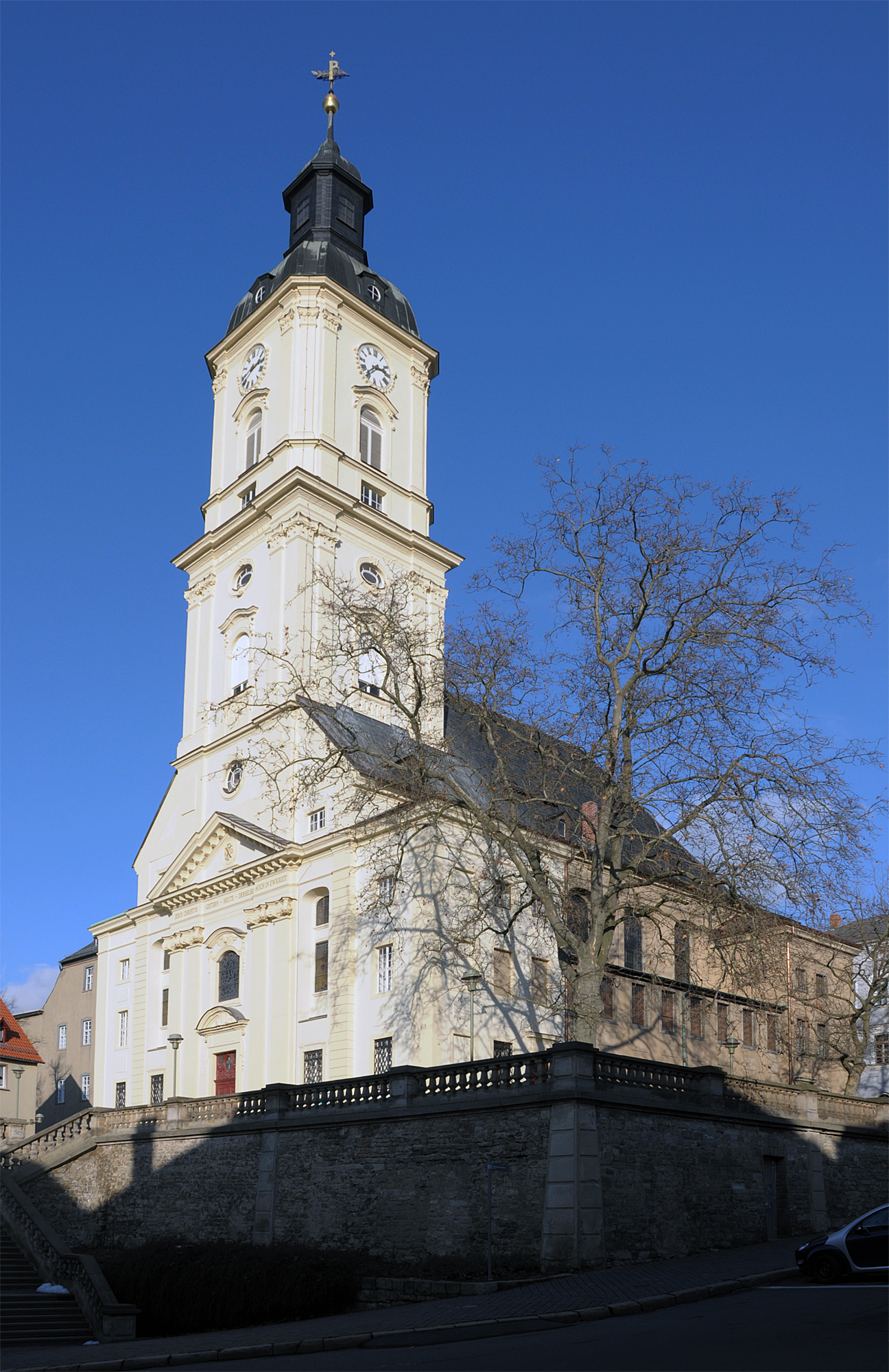
St. Saviour's Church

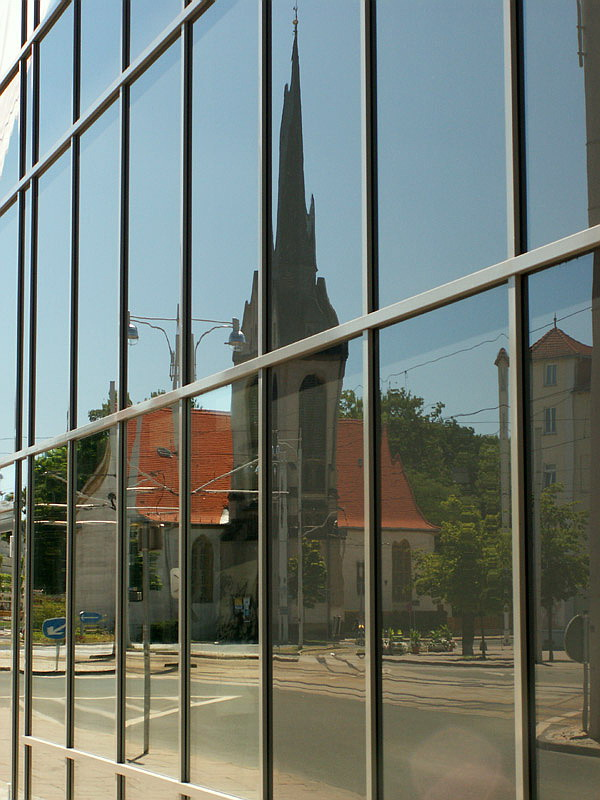
Trinity Church

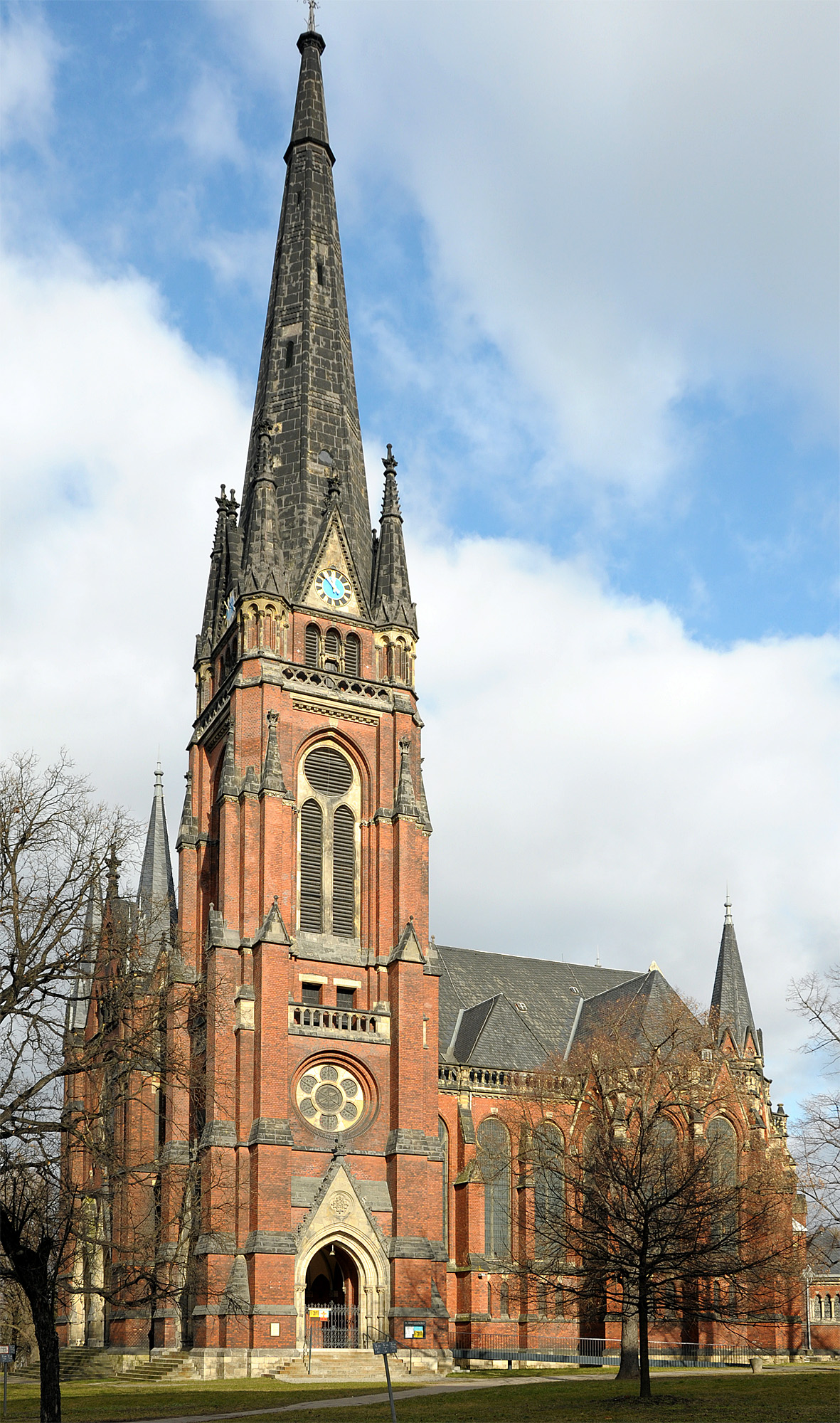
St. John's Church

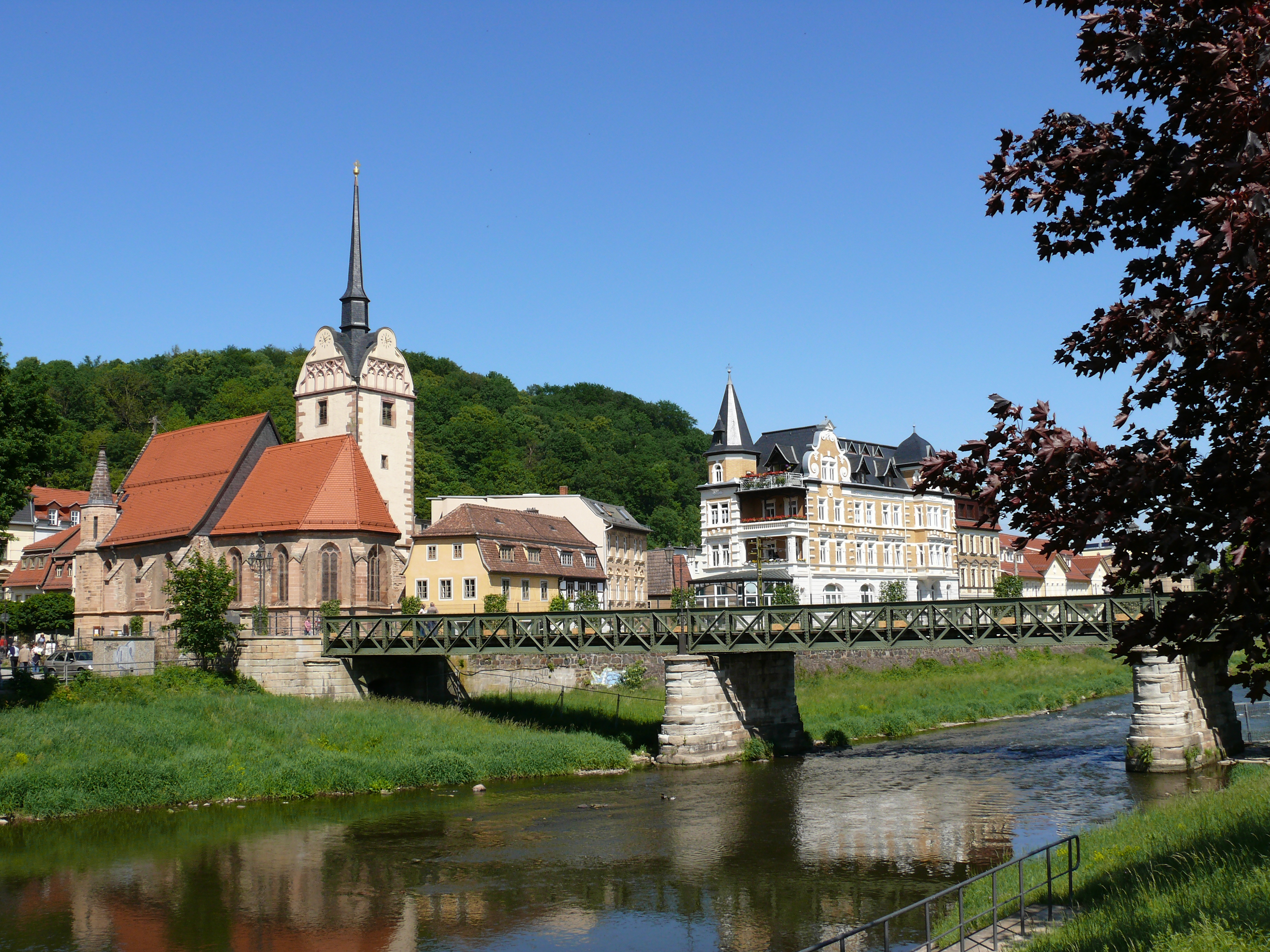
St. Mary's Church

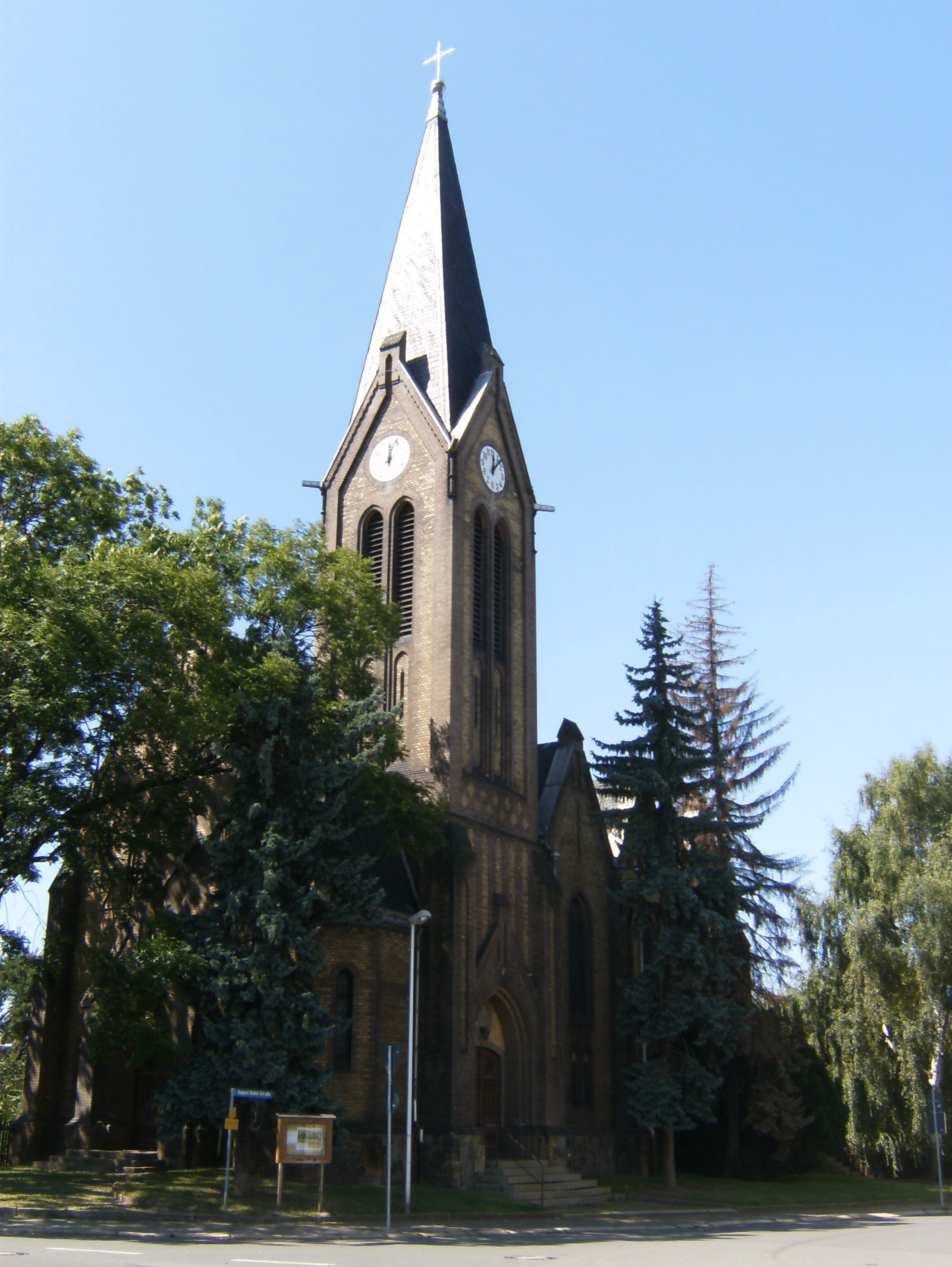
St. Martin's Church

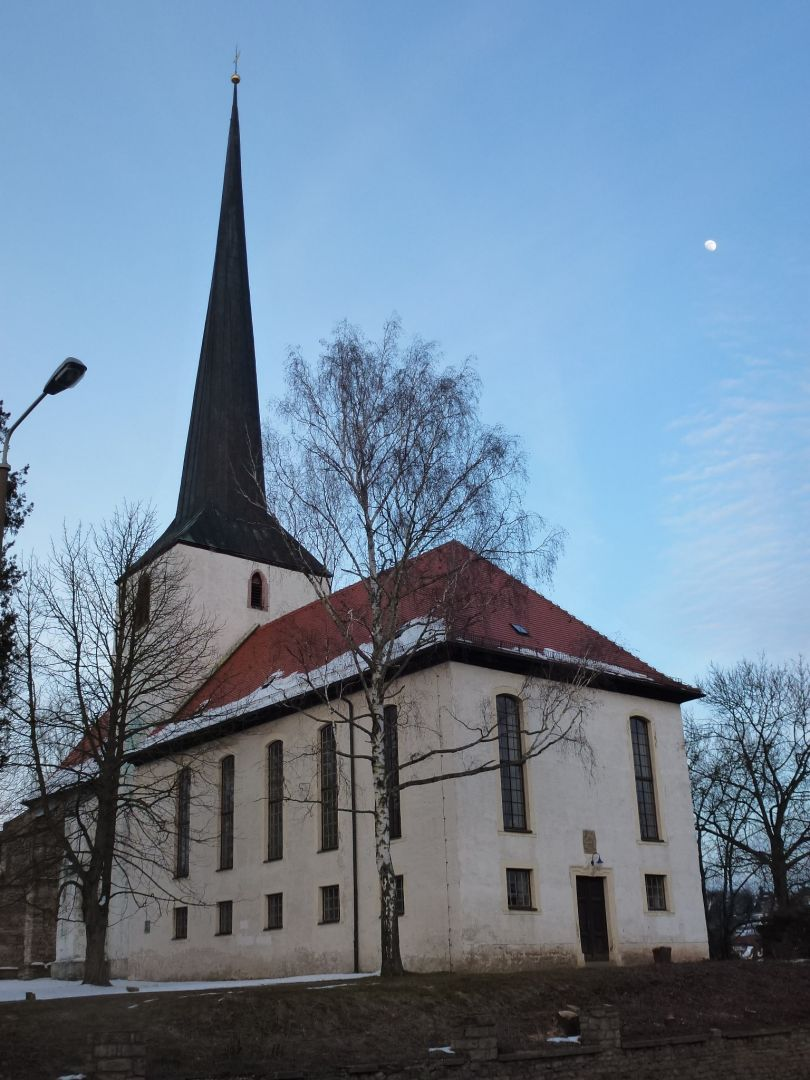
Fourteen Holy Helpers Church

==== Other sights ====
- The town hall at Marktplatz (market square) is one of the biggest Renaissance town halls in Germany with a nearly 60 m high tower, built between 1573 and 1576. The Marktplatz itself forms a good ensemble of 18th century patricians houses in late-Baroque style.
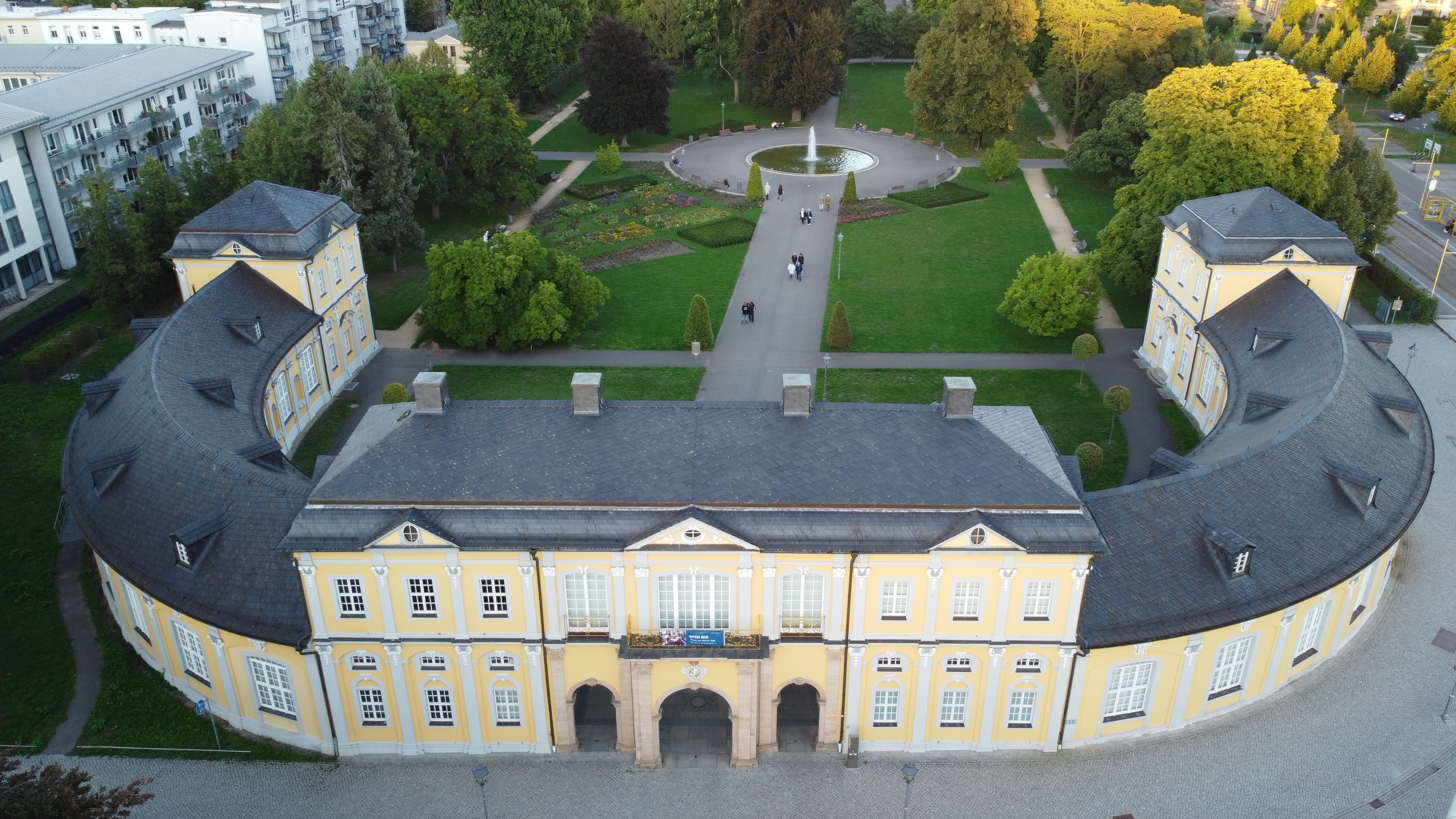
- Orangerie and Küchengarten (aerial view, 2022)
  The Stadttheater (city theatre) at Küchengartenallee is the former royal Reussian theatre, built in 1902 by Heinrich Seeling in neo-Baroque style.
- The Stadtapotheke (city pharmacy) is a Renaissance building at Marktplatz with a beautiful bay, established in 1592.
- The Küchengarten (literally “Kitchen Garden”) with the Orangerie is a park ensemble west of the city centre, established in 1732 by the Reussians.
- The Höhler is a cellar system under the city centre with a length of approx. 9 km (6 mi), established in 17th and 18th century for storing beer. A part can be visited via an entrance at Nicolaiberg 3.
- The Schloss Tinz (Tinz Castle) was the royal summer residence of the Reussians, built in 1748 in Baroque style with a surrounding park.
- The Schloss Osterstein (Osterstein Castle) was the main royal residence of the Reussians, built during the 16th century in Renaissance style. It was hit by bombs in 1945 and partially demolished in 1962. Only the tower remained.
- The city wall was demolished in the 19th century, only a small part at Stadtgraben remained.

==== Image gallery ====
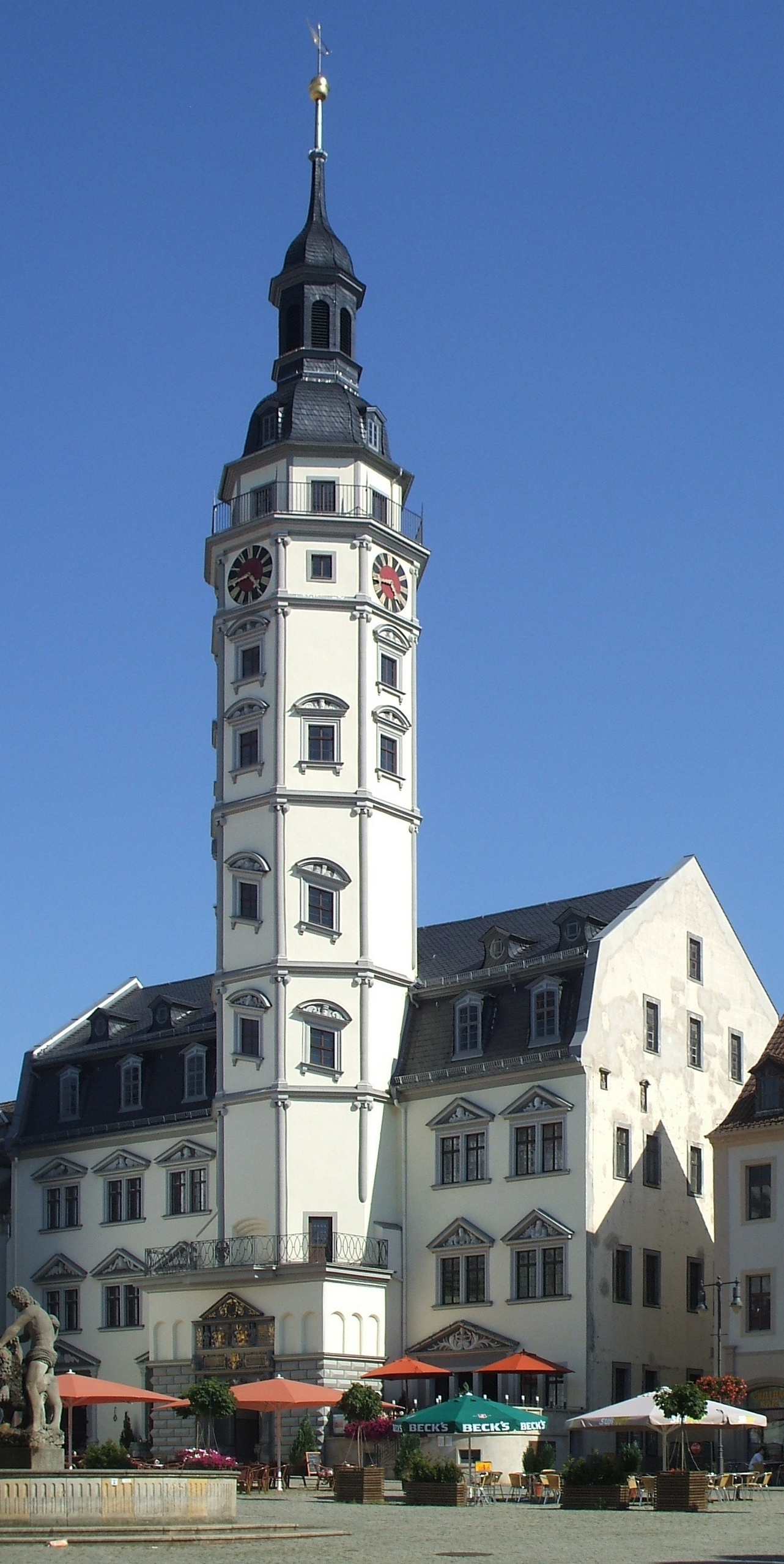
Town hall

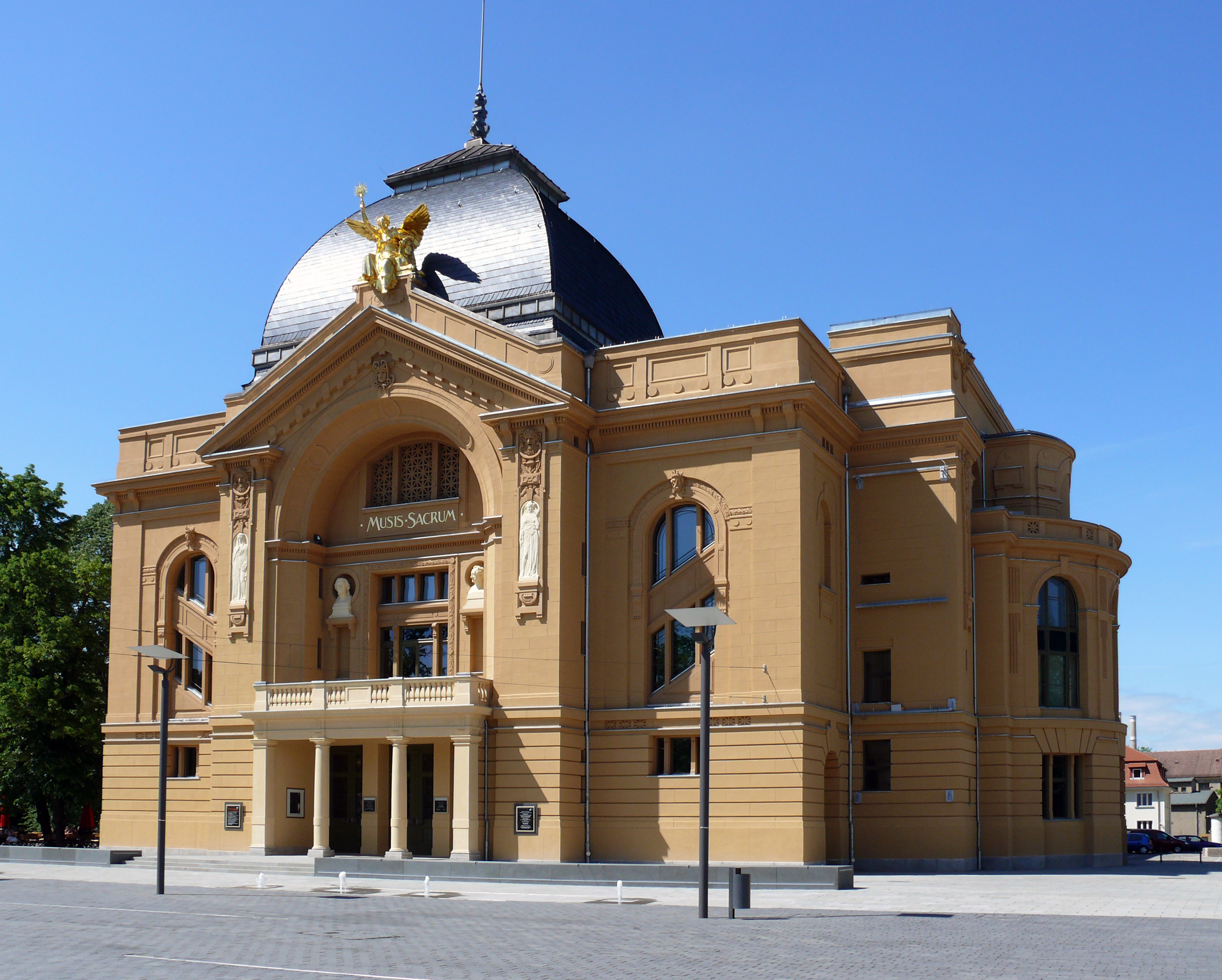
Theatre

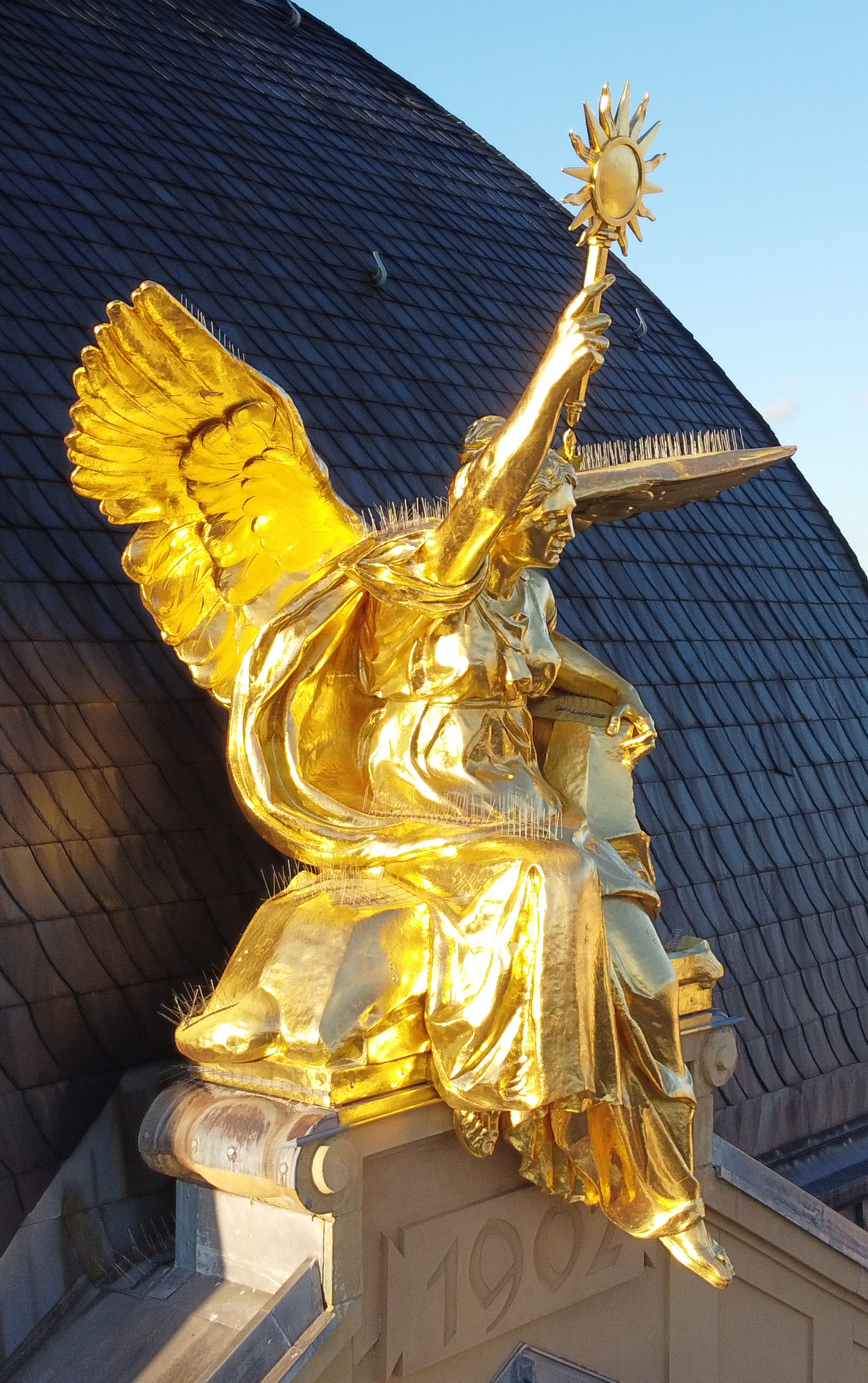
Statue of Genius on the theatre roof

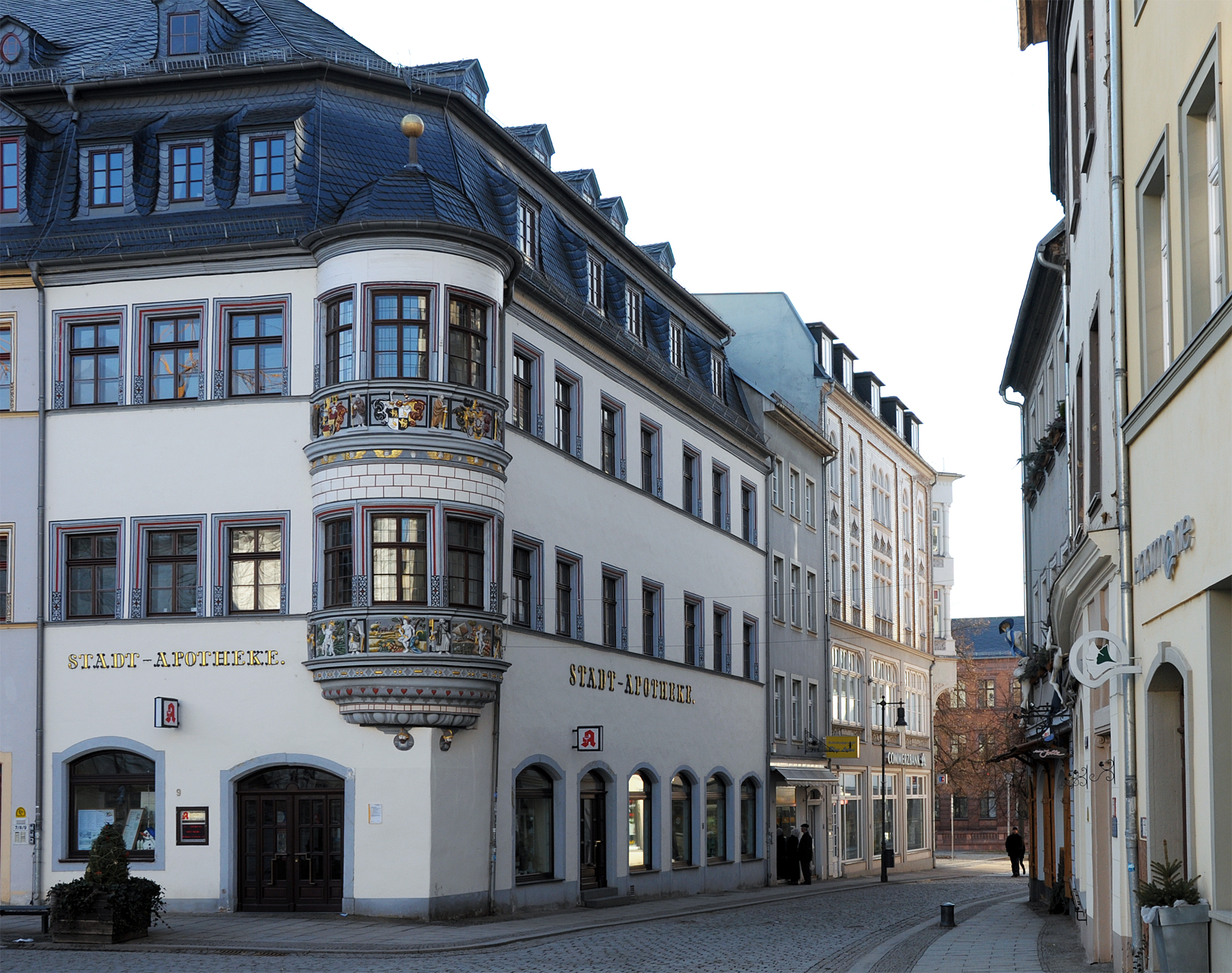
City Pharmacy

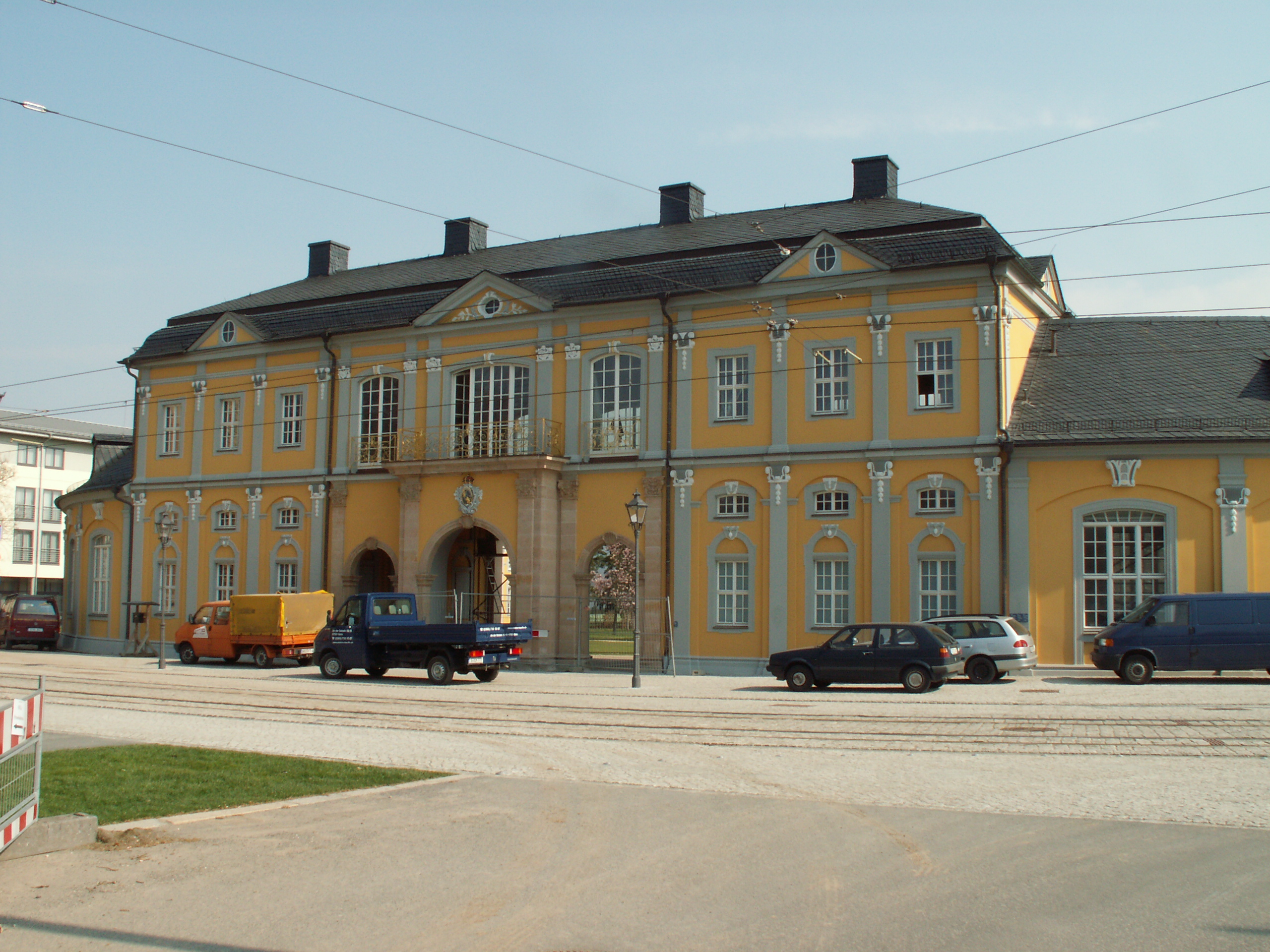
Orangerie at Küchengarten

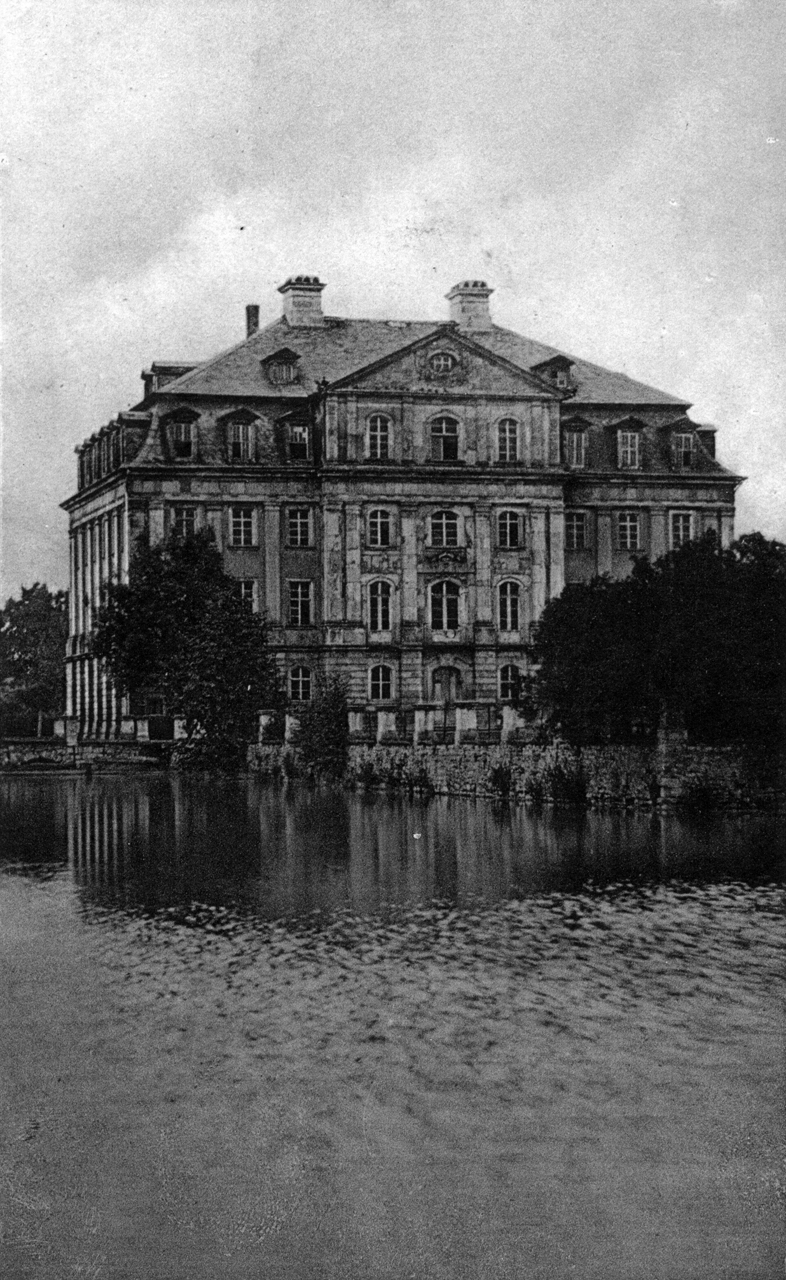
Tinz Castle

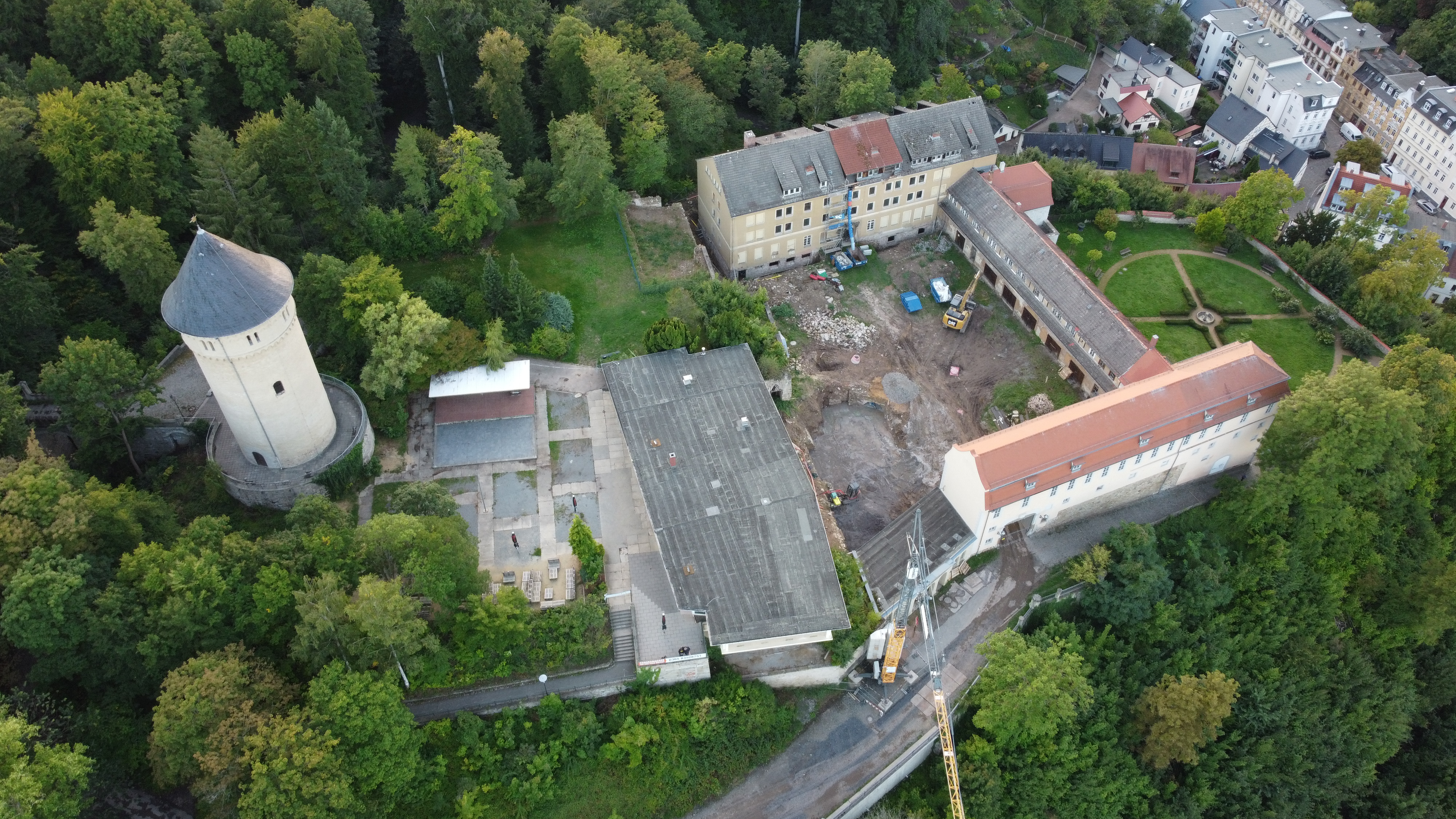
Remains of Osterstein Castle

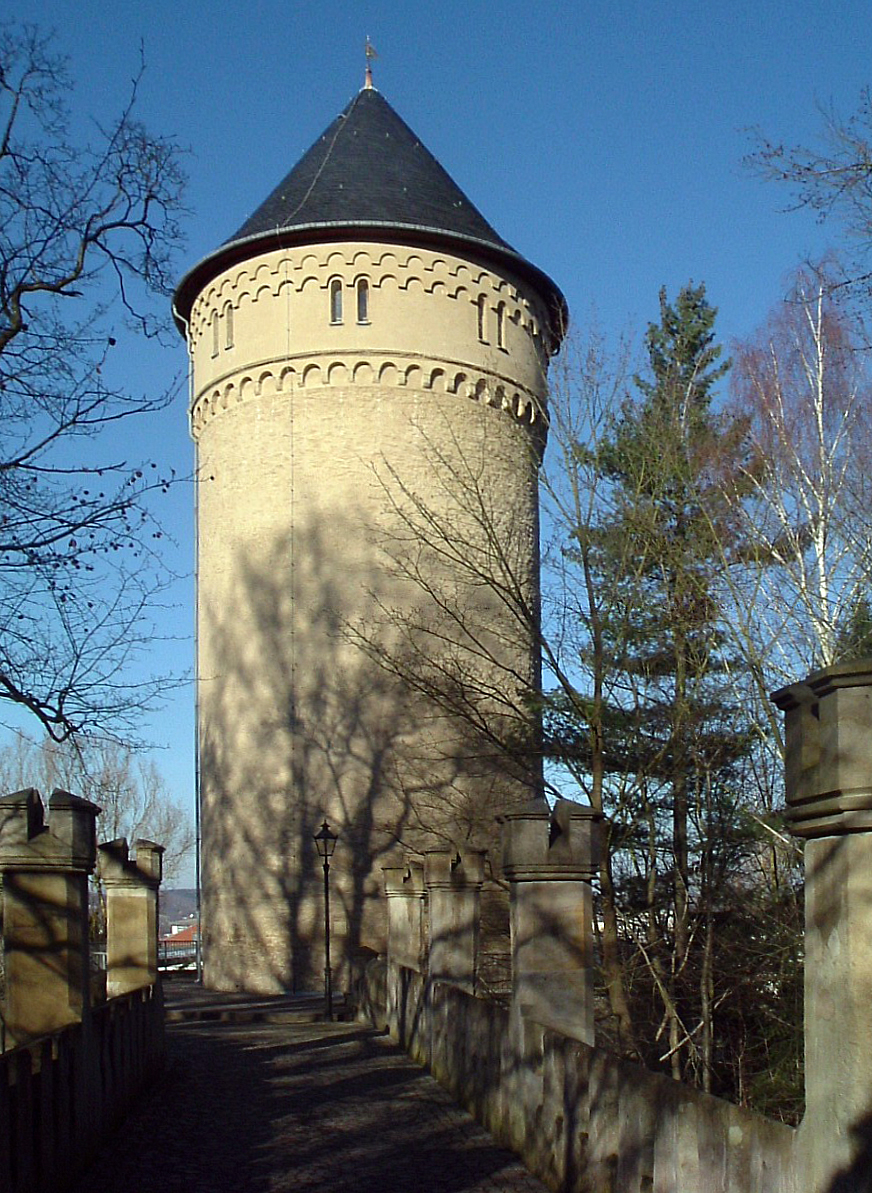
Tower of Osterstein Castle

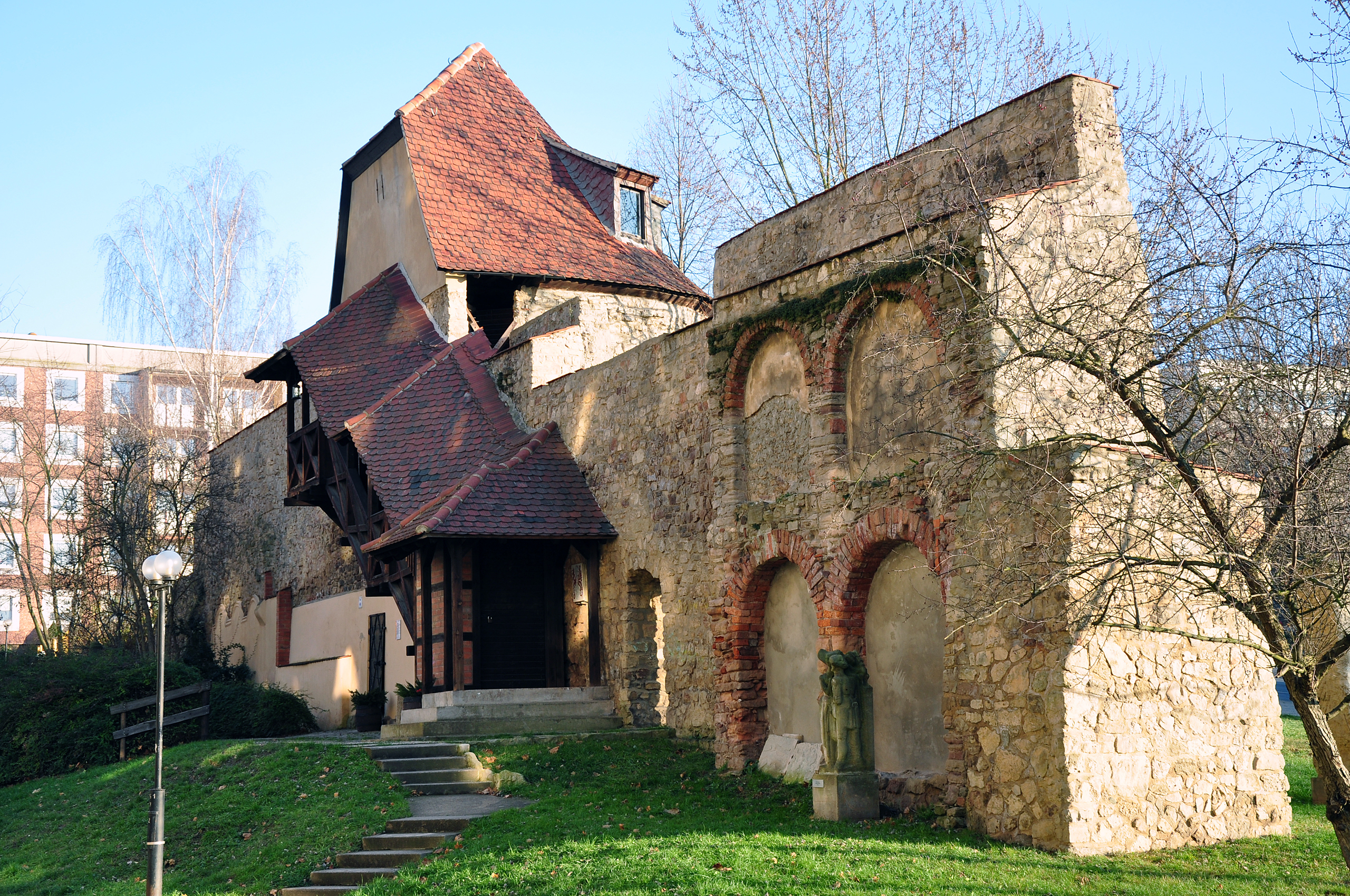
City wall

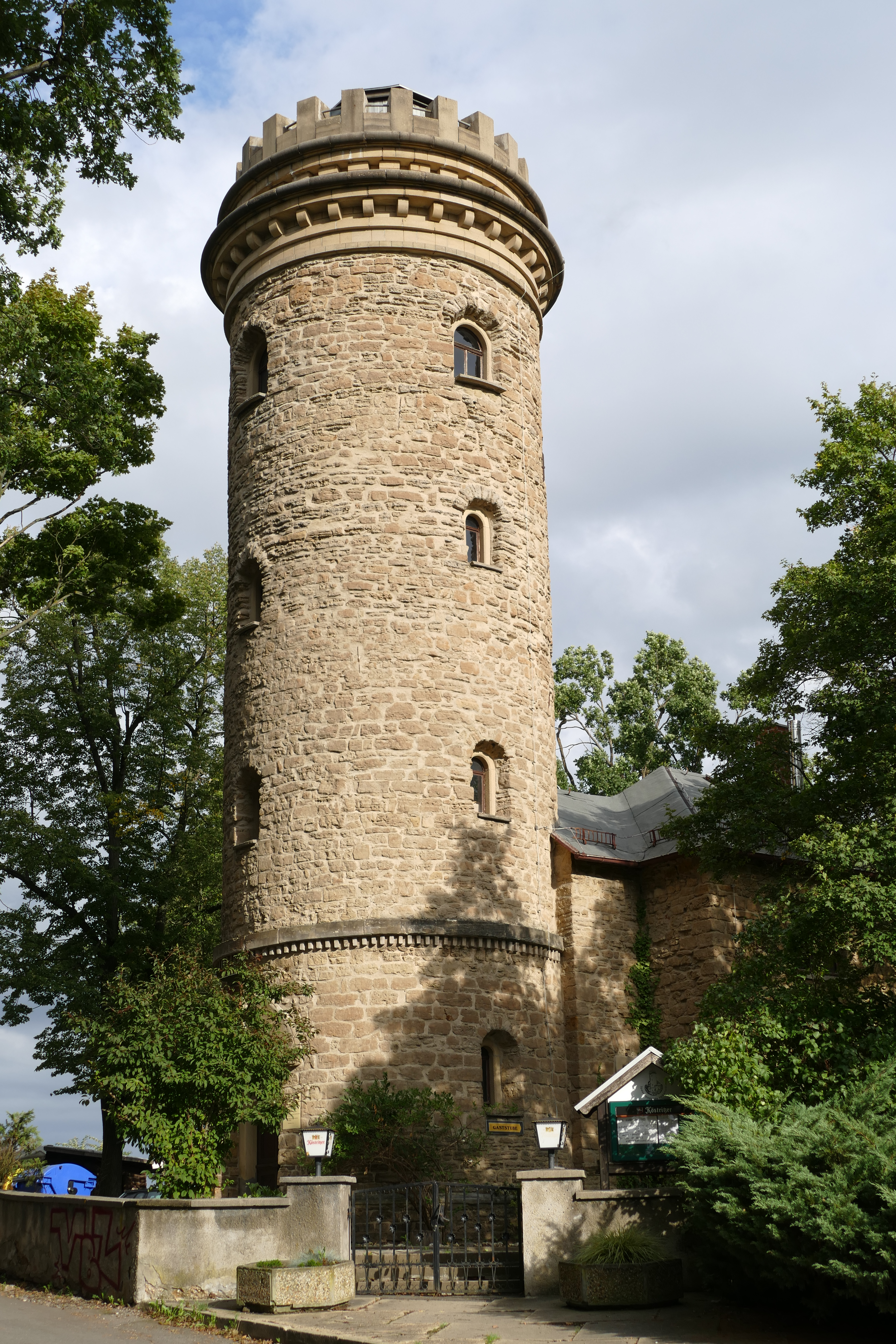
Ferber's Tower

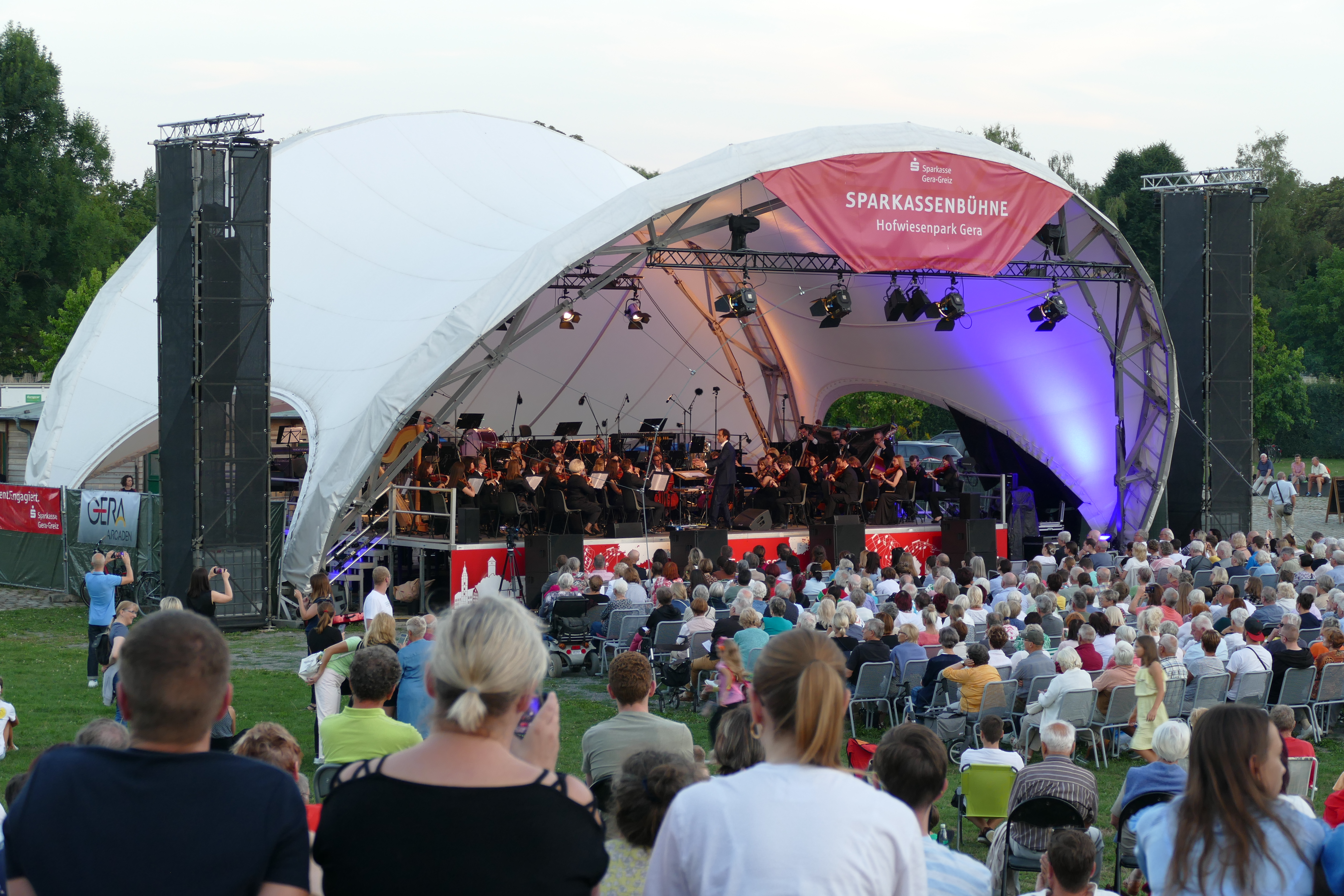
Veolia Stage in Hofwiesenpark

== Economy and infrastructure ==
=== Basic economic data ===
In 2022, 22544 people were employed full-time in Gera with a median salary of EUR 2,595.34. The median wage in Gera is 10% lower compared to eastern Germany.

=== Agriculture, industry and services ===
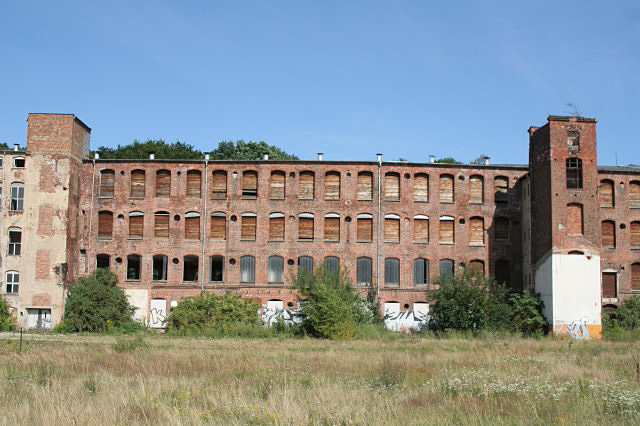
A former textile factory in Gera

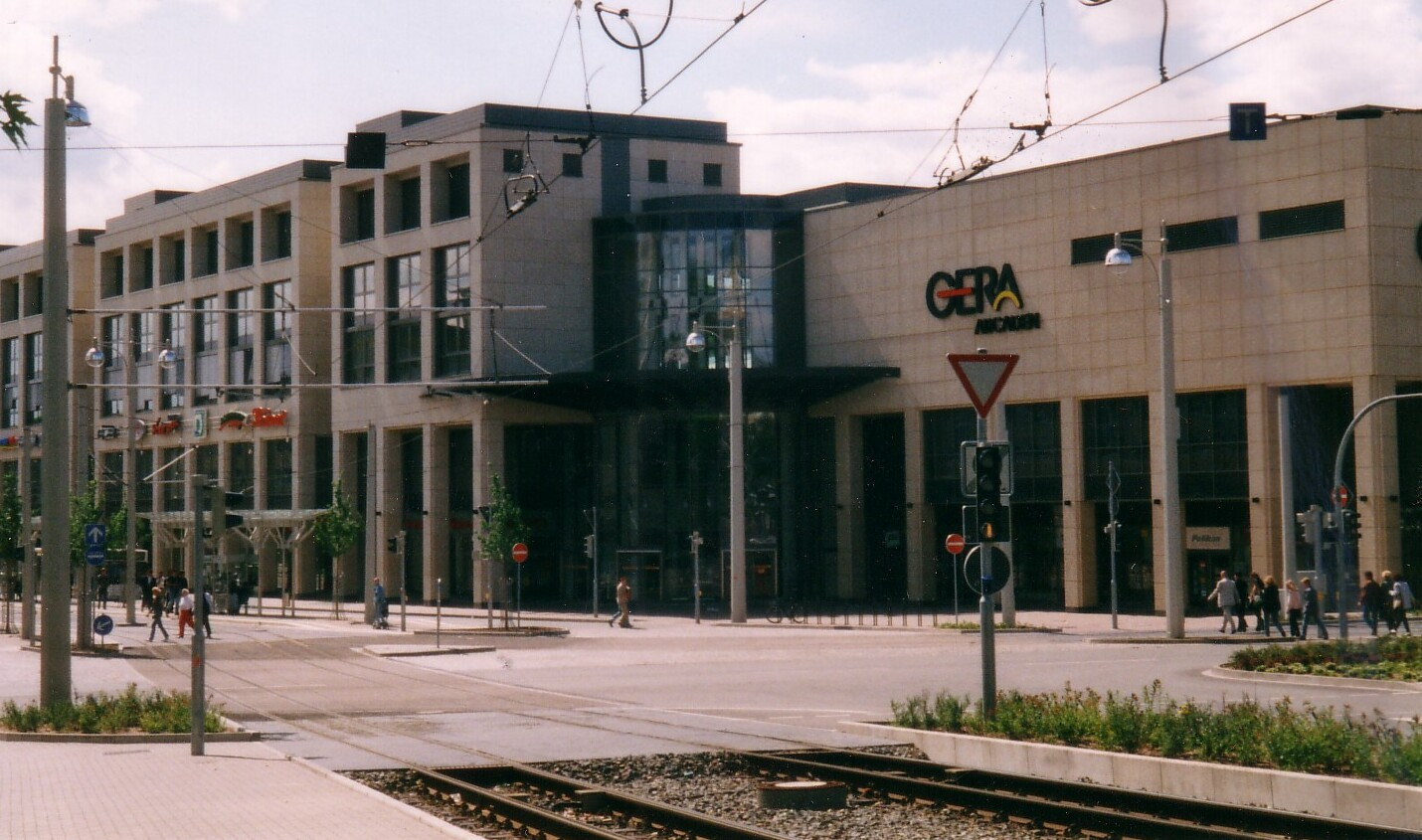
Shopping centre "Gera Arcaden"

Agriculture has some importance in the rural districts of Gera, especially in the northern and eastern city parts. Approximately 57% of the municipal territory is in agricultural use: growing maize, rapeseed and crops as well as pasturing cattle.

The city's economy features industrial machinery (Dagro Gera GmbH), communications (DTKS GmbH, Deutsche Telekom), security locks (Schloßsicherungen Gera GmbH), optics (POG Präzisionsoptik Gera GmbH), electrical equipment (Electronicon Kondensatoren GmbH), and margarine manufacturing (Othüna). Other companies include a compressor manufacturer (Kompressorenwerk Kaeser), a precision-tool maker (SMK-Präzisionsmechanik), and a subsidiary of the construction company Max Bögl. The e-commerce service-provider D+S Europe has a service centre in Gera with several hundred workers, and Rittal, a manufacturer of information-technology enclosures, recently moved from Bad Köstritz to Gera. Some industrial branches operating before 1990 no longer have major importance. Sectors either no longer existing or sharply reduced include those in toolmaking (VEB Wema Union), textiles (VEB Modedruck), textile machinery (VEB Textima), electronic equipment (VEB Elektronik Gera). Other industries that had a presence included VEB Carl Zeiss Jena and a brewery. One important industrial branch had been uranium-ore mining in nearby Ronneburg (Wismut), whereby the region became the Soviet Union's leading uranium supplier. In 2012 Gera had 41 companies with more than 20 workers in the industrial sector, employing 3,400 people and generating an overall turnover of €452 million.

Gera is a supra-centre according to the Central Place Theory in German regional planning. This makes the city a regional centre for retailing, with three major shopping centres: Gera-Arcaden, Amthor-Passage and Elster-Forum. Health services are important, with one of the biggest hospitals in Thuringia, the SRH Waldklinikum. Nevertheless, Gera's economy is weak compared to equal-sized neighbouring cities like Jena or Zwickau. While Jena counts 51,000 and Zwickau 50,000 jobs liable to pay into the German social insurance, Gera had only 35,000 of those full-time jobs in 2012. The commuter balance was +14,000 in Jena and +16,000 in Zwickau, but only +2,000 in Gera, which is one of the lowest ratios among German supra-centres, highlighting the lack of ability of Gera to provide jobs for the region. The unemployment rate reached 11.2% in September 2013 - the highest among all Thuringian districts.

=== Transport ===
==== By rail ====
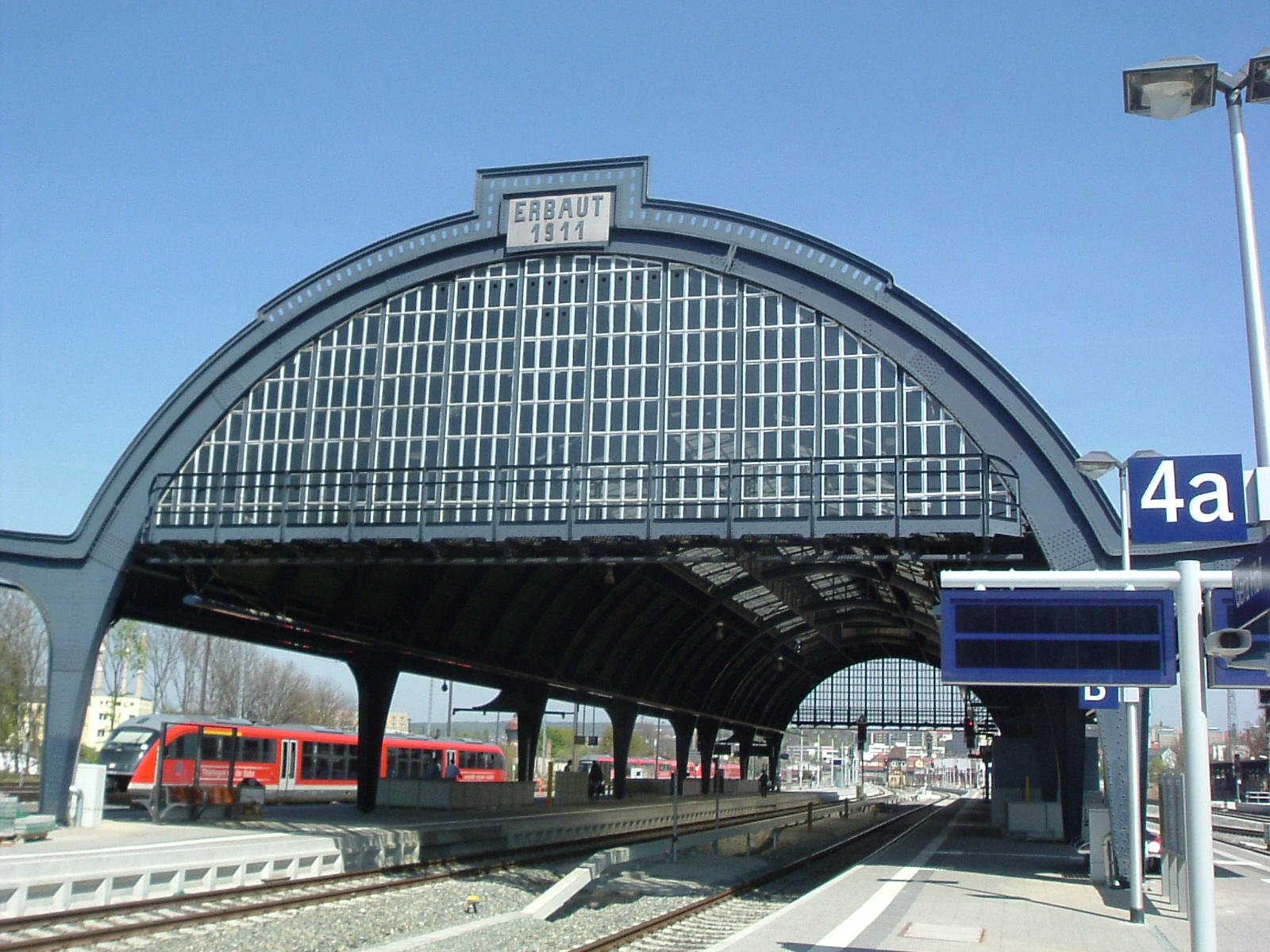
Gera main station hall

Since the late 19th century, Gera has been a hub in the railway network. The first railway ran to the Thuringian Railway in Weißenfels (with connection to Halle) via Zeitz in 1859. Further main lines were opened to Gößnitz (with connection to Chemnitz) in 1865, to Saalfeld in 1871, to Leipzig (via Zeitz) in 1873, to Plauen in 1875, to Weimar (with connection to Erfurt) via Jena in 1876 and to Hof in 1883. The secondary railways to Werdau (opened in 1876) and Meuselwitz (opened via Pölzig in 1901 and via Lumpzig in 1887) are abandoned. Nevertheless, none of these lines are electrified or in use for long-distance trains. Today, there are regional express trains to Göttingen via Jena and Erfurt, to Leipzig via Zeitz, to Altenburg, Glauchau and Zwickau via the Gößnitz line, to Greiz, to Hof and to Saalfeld. Local trains provide connections to Weimar via Jena, Leipzig, Weischlitz (near Plauen), Hof and Saalfeld. The most lines run every two hours, so that there is hourly service (express and local trains in alternation) to most directions. The electrification of the west-eastern mainline Weimar – Jena – Gera – Gößnitz is in discussion for closing that gap in the network and enable Gera's connection to long-distance trains, which can be reached today either via Jena or via Leipzig.

The most important stations in Gera are the Gera main station (former Prussian station), where all the trains stop, and the Gera southern station (former Saxonian station), where all the trains, except the local ones to Weimar, stop. More stations in Gera are Langenberg at the Leipzig line, Zwötzen at the Saalfeld and Hof line as well as Gera Ost and Liebschwitz at the Plauen line. Freight transport by rail is immaterial in Gera since the 1990s.

==== By road ====
The two Autobahnen crossing each other nearby at Hermsdorf junction are the Bundesautobahn 4 (Frankfurt–Dresden) and the Bundesautobahn 9 (Berlin–Munich), which were both built during the 1930s. Furthermore, there are three Bundesstraßen connecting Gera: the Bundesstraße 2 to Zeitz in the north and Hof in the south, the Bundesstraße 7 to Jena (via Eisenberg) in the west and to Altenburg in the east and the Bundesstraße 92 to Plauen (via Greiz) in the south. Important secondary roads run to Altenburg (via Lumpzig), to Werdau (via Linda), to Wünschendorf, to Stadtroda and to Hermsdorf. As part of the Bundesgartenschau 2007, a new bypass road was built in the east to improve the connection of southern city parts to the A 4 and to relieve the city centre from transit traffic.

==== By aviation ====
The closest regional airports are the Leipzig/Halle Airport, about 70 km (43 mi) north and the Erfurt-Weimar Airport, about 90 km (56 mi) west of Gera. The nearest major airport is Berlin Brandenburg Airport, located 260 km (162 mi) north east of Gera. In the eastern part of Gera lies the airfield Gera-Leumnitz meant for private aviation.

==== By bike ====
Cycling is becoming more popular since the construction of quality cycle tracks began in the 1990s. For tourists, there are the Weiße Elster track and the Thuringian city string track (Radweg Thüringer Städtekette). Both connect points of tourist interest, the first along the White Elster valley from the Elster Mountains at the Czech border to Saale river in Halle and second from Eisenach via Erfurt, Weimar, Jena and Gera to Altenburg. For inner city every-day traffic, some cycle lanes exist along several main streets.

==== Trams and buses ====
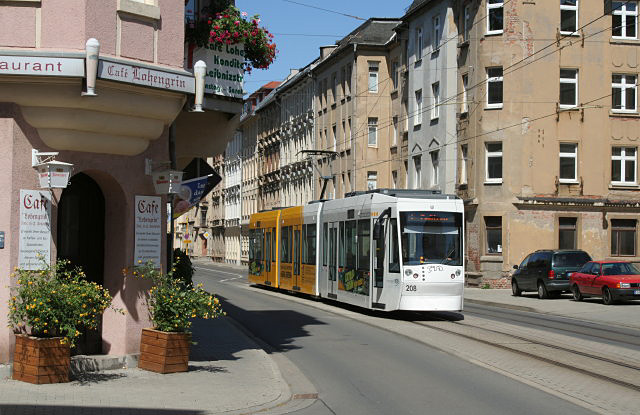
Tram at Leibnitzstraße

The Gera tram network was the second in Germany that launched electrical engines in 1892. Today, there are two long lines, one from Bieblach via city centre to Lusan (line 3) and another one – opened in 2006 – from Untermhaus via city centre to Zwötzen (line 1). The third short line is a connection between Lusan and the Zwötzen railway station (line 2). Another line is planned to connect Langenberg and the northern city parts. On line 3 is one service every 5 minutes, on line 1 every 10 minutes and on line 2 every 20 minutes.

The bus network connects districts without trams as well as neighbouring municipalities that do not have a rail connection.

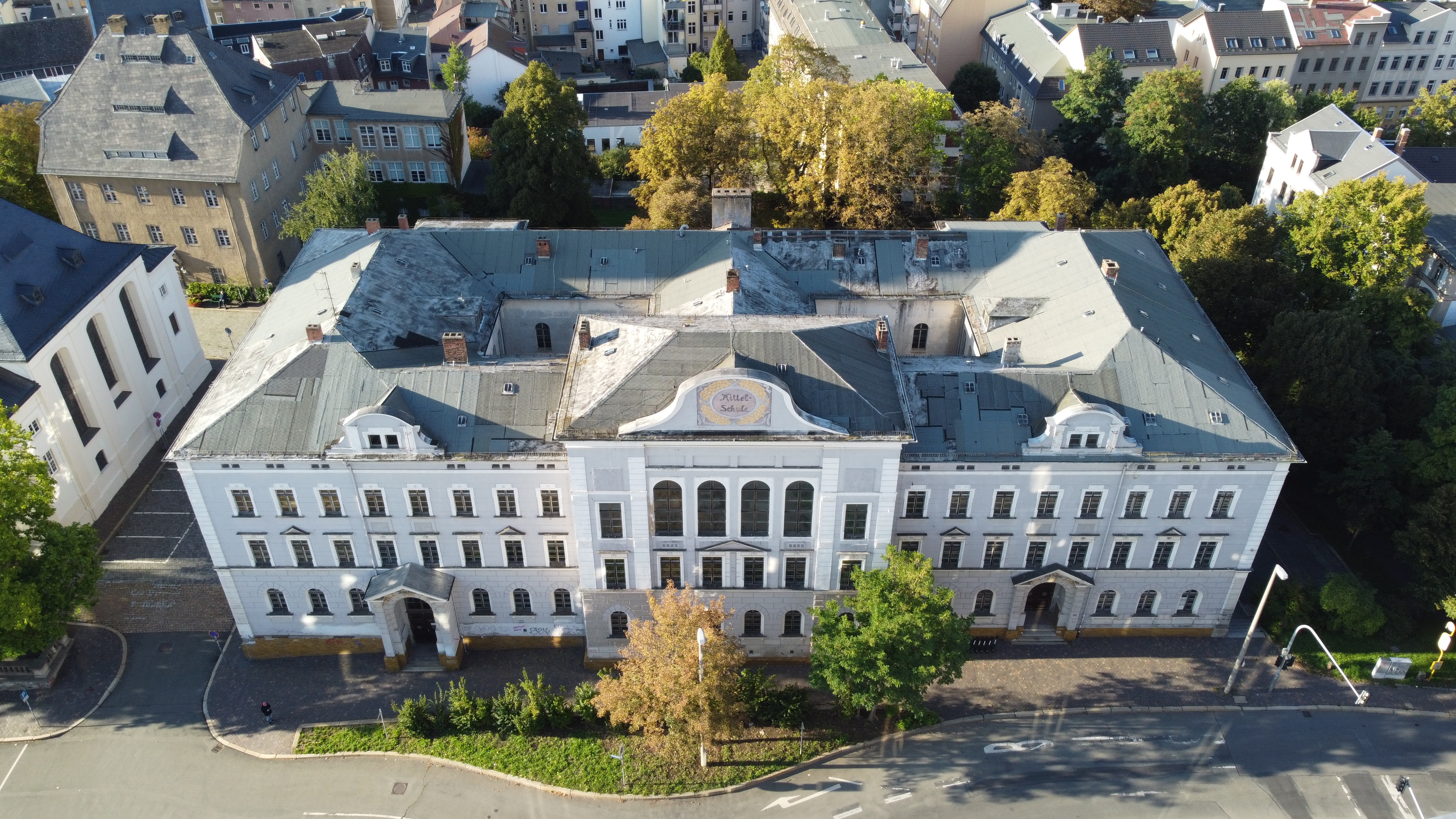
Former building I of Rutheneum school (aerial view, 2022)

=== Education ===
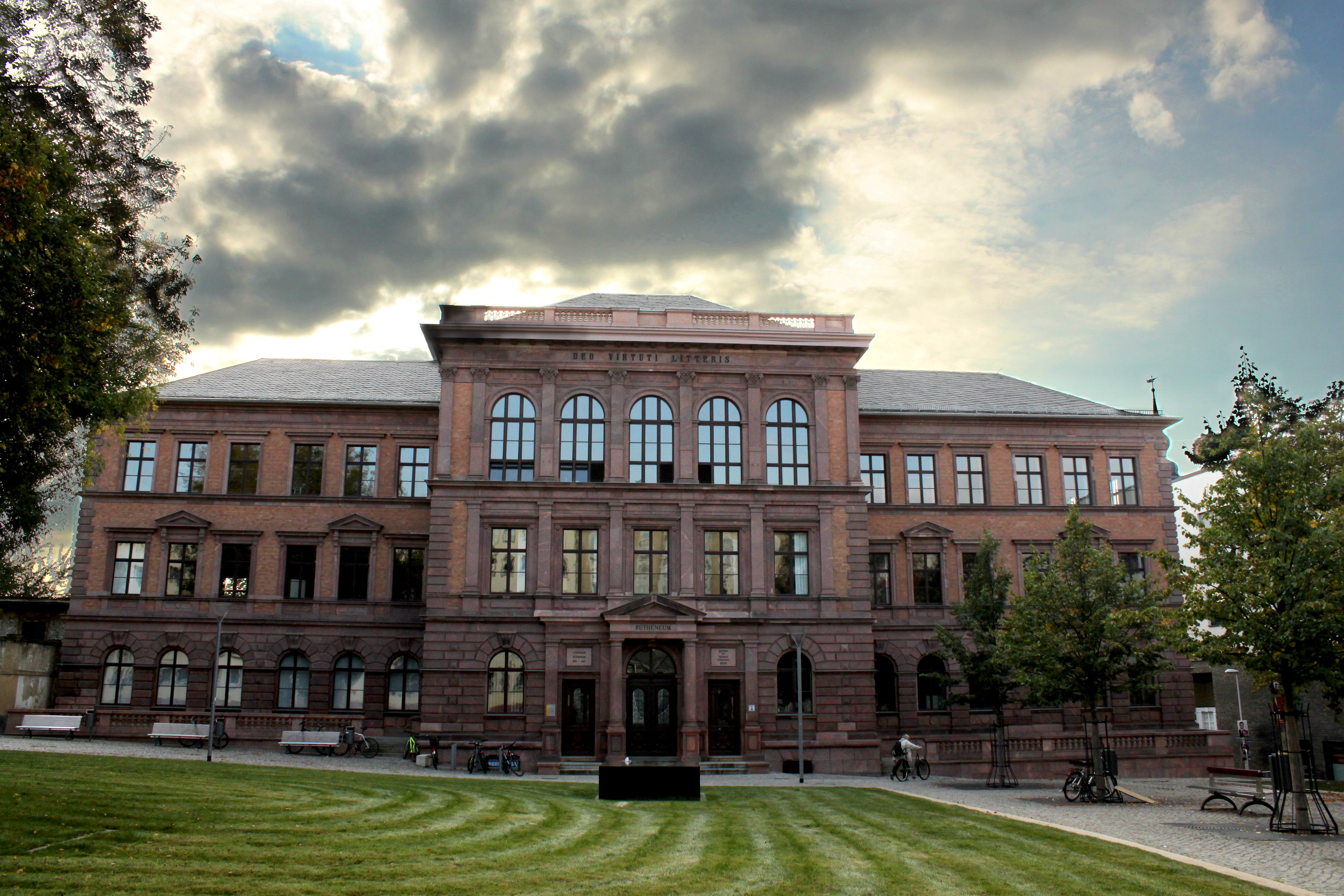
Goethe-Gymnasium/Rutheneum school

Tertiary institutions are the private college SRH Fachhochschule für Gesundheit Gera (university of applied sciences for health) with 500 students and the Gera branch of the Duale Hochschule Gera-Eisenach (cooperative state college) with 850 students locally.

Furthermore, there are four Gymnasiums, all of them are state-owned. The Goethe-Gymnasium/Rutheneum seit 1608 (“since 1608”) focuses on music education as an elite boarding school, in addition to the common curriculum.

== Politics ==
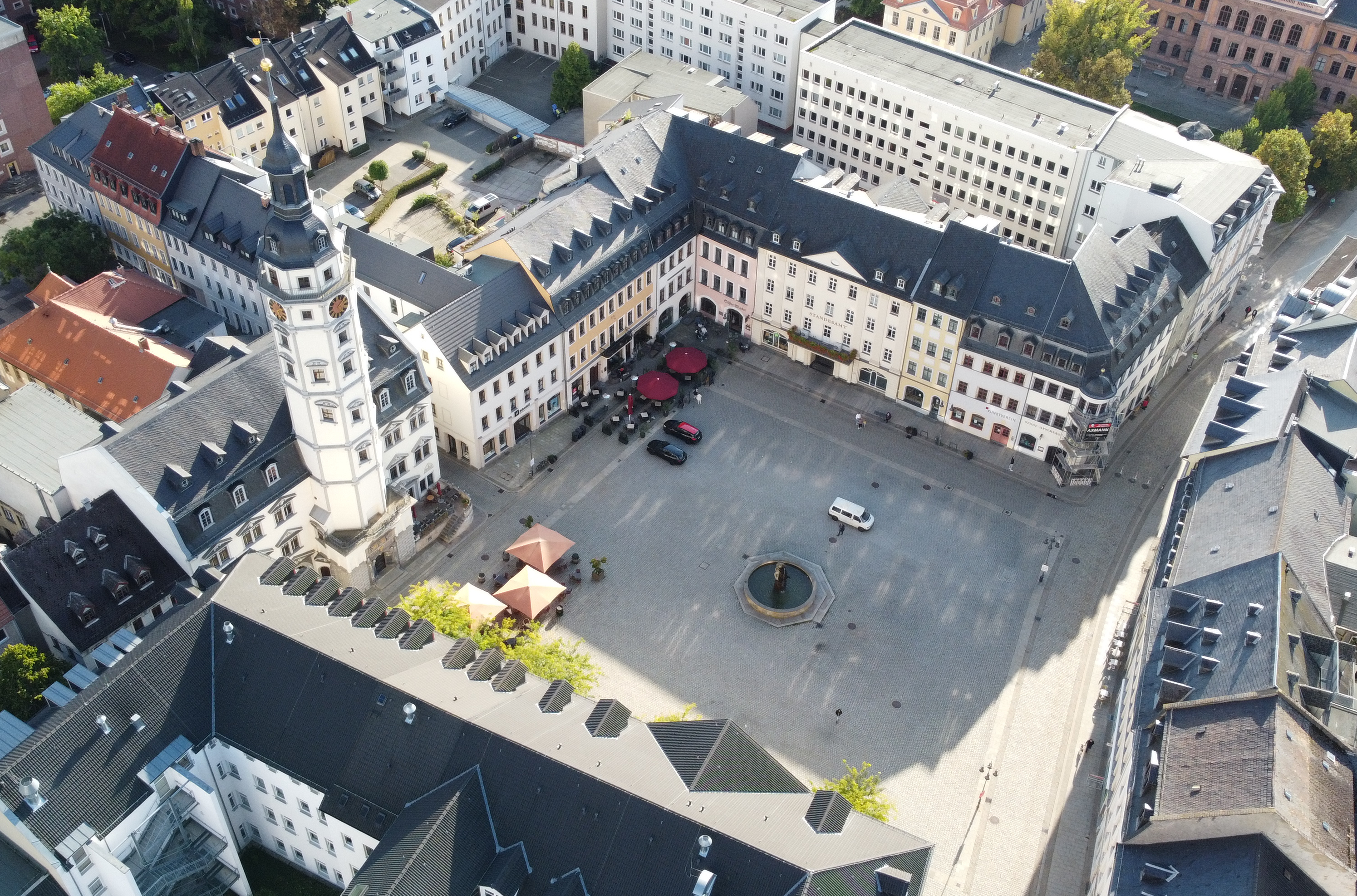
Market square with town hall (aerial view, 2022)

The first freely elected mayor after German reunification was independent Ralf Rauch, who served from 1994 to 2006. He was succeeded by Norbert Vornehm of the Social Democratic Party (SPD), who served from 2006 to 2012. Viola Hahn was elected in 2012, but was defeated seeking re-election in 2018, failing to progress to the second round. Julian Vonarb served from 2018 to 2024 when he was also defeated seeking re-election, succeeded by Kurt Dannenberg (CDU). The most recent mayoral election was held on 26 May 2024, with a runoff held on 9 June, and the results were as follows:

Candidate	Party	First round		Second round	
Candidate	Party	Votes	%	Votes	%
Kurt Dannenberg	Christian Democratic Union	14,407	33.2	24,220	59.3
Julian Vonarb	Independent	13,933	32.3	16,593	40.7
Wieland Altenkirch	Alternative for Germany	10,580	24.4		
Yves Berlinghoff	Independent	3,305	7.6		
David Kaschta	Die PARTEI	1,060	2.4		
Valid votes		43,345	98.8	40,813	97.0
Invalid votes		535	1.2	1,266	3.0
Total		43,880	100.0	42,079	100.0
Electorate/voter turnout		75,088	58.4	74,984	56.1
Source: Wahlen in Thüringen

The most recent city council election was held on 26 May 2024, and the results were as follows:

Party	Lead candidate	Votes	%	+/-	Seats	+/-
Alternative for Germany (AfD)	Harald Frank	43,749	35.1	▲6.3	15	▲3
Christian Democratic Union (CDU)	Christian Klein	20,447	16.4	▲3.5	7	▲1
Alliance Gera	Julian Vonarb	19,843	15.9	New	7	New
The Left (Die Linke)	Andreas Schubert	15,345	12.3	▼6.0	5	▼3
Citizenry for Gera	Ulrich Porst	7,701	6.2	New	3	New
Social Democratic Party (SPD)	Elisabeth Kaiser	7,399	5.9	▼0.5	2	▼1
Alliance 90/The Greens (Grüne)	Nils Fröhlich	4,148	3.3	▼3.4	1	▼2
Die PARTEI (PARTEI)	Ingo Kaschta	2,442	2.0	▼0.7	1	0
Liberal Alliance (LA)	Anne Kathrin Hildebrand	2,070	1.7	▼1.2	1	0
Free Democratic Party (FDP)	Falk Nerger	1,612	1.3	▼1.4	0	▼1
Valid votes		124,756	100.0			
Invalid ballots		1,533	3.5			
Total ballots		44,012	100.0		42	0
Electorate/voter turnout		75,091	58.6	▲2.3		
Source: Wahlen in Thüringen

== Twin towns – sister cities ==
Gera is twinned with:

- Arnhem, Netherlands
- Fort Wayne, United States
- Goražde, Bosnia and Herzegovina
- Kuopio Finland
- Pskov, Russia
- Rostov-on-Don, Russia
- Saint-Denis, France
- Skierniewice, Poland
- Sliven, Bulgaria
- Timișoara, Romania

== Notable people ==
- Heinrich Reinhold (1788–1825), painter and engraver
- Friedrich August Schmidt (1795–1866), painter, lithographer and porcelain painter
- Otto Lummer (1860–1925), physicist
- Otto Dix (1891–1969), painter and printmaker
- Rudolf Paul (1893–1978), politician, President of Thuringia 1945–1947
- Kurt Günther (1896–1947), SA general and Nazi Party politician
- Charlotte Hohmann (1900–1971), magazine editor-in-chief of Die Frau von heute
- Bernhard Wehner (1909–1995), SS-officer (Hauptsturmführer), criminal inspector and journalist
- Dietrich Peltz (1914–2001), Luftwaffe general
- Georg Buschner (1925–2007), football player, head coach East Germany national football team

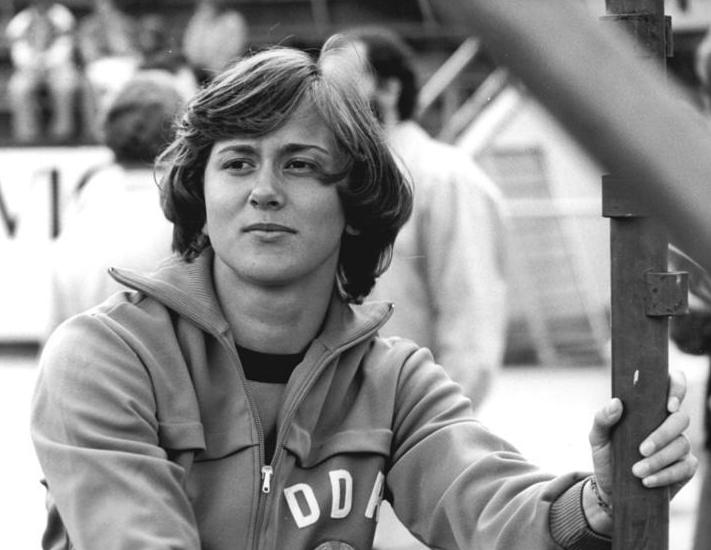
Marlies Göhr in 1978

- Max Frankel (1930–2025), executive editor, New York Times 1986–1994
- Klaus Kropfinger (1930–2016), musicologist
- Helmut Semmelmann (born 1934), politician (SPD), farmer
- Helga Königsdorf (1938–2014), mathematician and author
- Rainer Ortleb (born 1944), politician (FDP), 1990–1991 Federal Minister for Special Affairs and from 1991 to 1994 Federal Minister of Education and Science
- Thilo Sarrazin (born 1945), German politician (SPD), author
- Wolfgang Tiefensee (born 1955), politician (SPD)
- Marlies Göhr (born 1958), athlete
- Olaf Ludwig (born 1960), racing cyclist
- Heike Drechsler (born 1964), Olympic gold medalist long jumper
- Jens Heppner (born 1964), racing cyclist
- Julia Scharf (born 1981), journalist
- John Degenkolb (born 1989), racing cyclist
- Marcel Eckardt (born 1989), snooker referee
- Bianca Schmidt (born 1990), footballer
