= Auma-Weidatal (Verwaltungsgemeinschaft) =

Coordinates: 50.700°N 11.900°E

Auma-Weidatal was a Verwaltungsgemeinschaft ("collective municipality") in the district of Greiz, in Thuringia, Germany. The seat of the Verwaltungsgemeinschaft was in Auma. The Verwaltungsgemeinschaft was disbanded on 1 December 2011, when its constituent municipalities were merged into the towns Auma-Weidatal (formed at the same date) and Zeulenroda-Triebes.

The Verwaltungsgemeinschaft Auma-Weidatal consisted of the following municipalities:

1. Auma
2. Braunsdorf
3. Göhren-Döhlen
4. Merkendorf
5. Silberfeld
6. Staitz
7. Wiebelsdorf
8. Zadelsdorf
