= Berga-Wünschendorf =

- Town
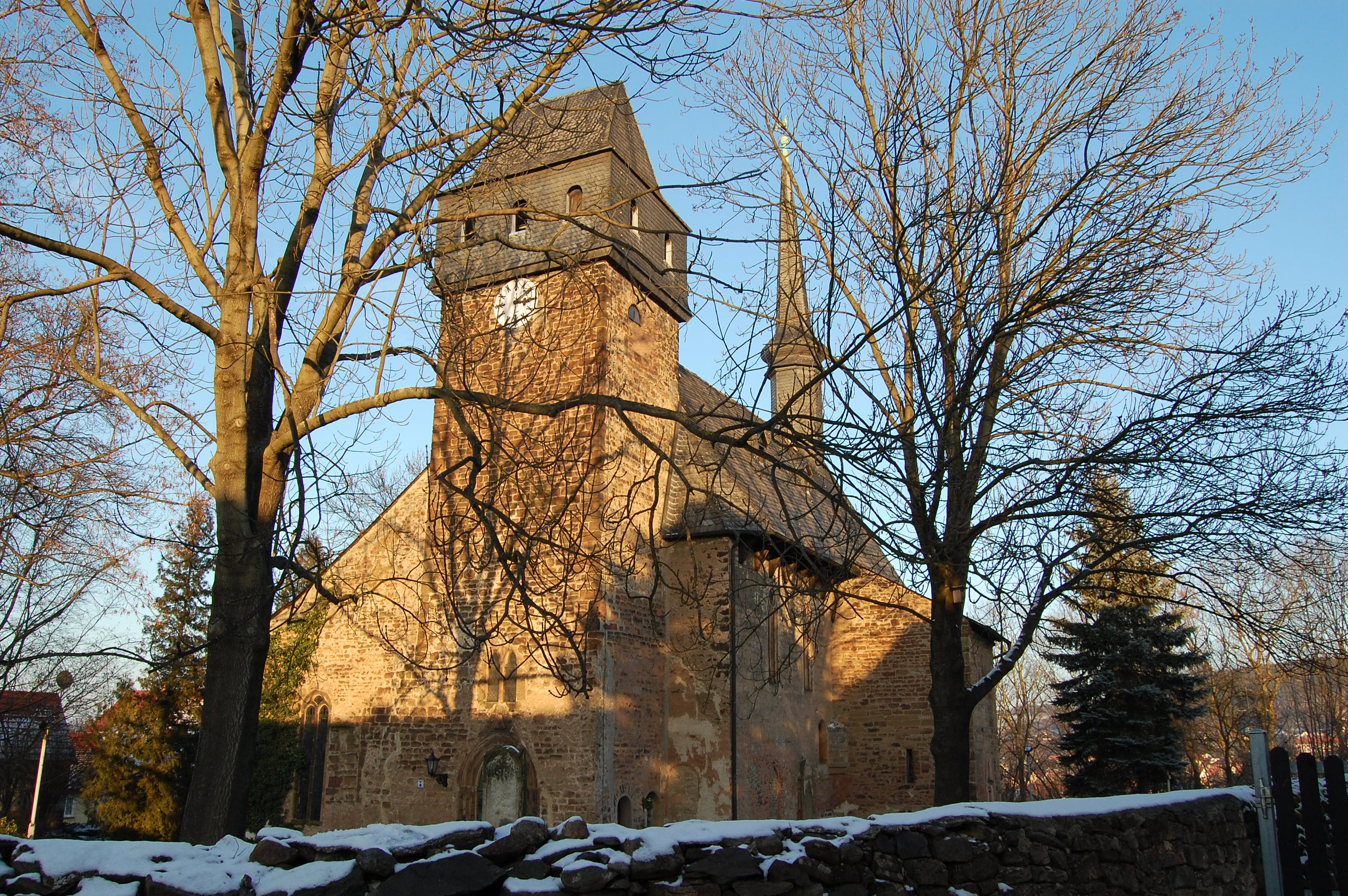
- Church of Saint Vitus
- Interactive map of Berga-Wünschendorf
- Location within Germany Location within Thuringia
- Coordinates: 50°45′N 12°10′E
- Country: Germany
- State: Thuringia
- District: Greiz

Government
  - Mayor (2024–30): Marko Geelhaar

Area
  - Total: 63.02 km^{2} (24.33 sq mi)
- Elevation: 229 m (751 ft)

Population (2025-12-31)
  - Total: 5,840
  - Density: 92.7/km^{2} (240/sq mi)
- Time zone: UTC+01:00 (CET)
  - Summer (DST): UTC+02:00 (CEST)
- Postal codes: 07980, 07570
- Dialling codes: 036623, 036603
- Vehicle registration: GRZ, ZR

Berga-Wünschendorf (German pronunciation: [ˈbɛʁɡa ˈvʏnʃn̩dɔʁf]) is a town in the district of Greiz, in Thuringia, Germany. The municipality consists of 24 Ortsteile.

== Geography ==
=== Geographical location ===
The municipality of Berga-Wünschendorf is located in the southeast of Thuringia, directly on the state border with Saxony.

=== Neighboring communities ===
Adjacent communities are, starting in the north and moving clockwise, Gera, Endschütz, Linda bei Weida, Gauern, Seelingstädt, Mohlsdorf-Teichwolframsdorf, Greiz, Langenwetzendorf, Weida, Teichwitz, Crimla and Zedlitz.

=== Municipal structure ===
Spatially separated, 24 districts belong to Berga-Wünschendorf: Albersdorf, Berga/Elster (with Pöltschen to the south), Clodra, Cronschwitz, Dittersdorf, Eula, Großdraxdorf, Kleinkundorf, Markersdorf, Meilitz, Mildenfurth, Mosen, Obergeißendorf, Pösneck, Tschirma, Untergeißendorf, Untitz, Veitsberg, Wernsdorf, Wolfersdorf, Wunschendorf/Elster, Zickra, Zossen and Zschorta.

== History ==
In July 2022, the local councils of Berga/Elster and Wunschendorf/Elster decided to merge to form the new town of Berga-Wünschendorf on 1 January 2024. In November 2023, criticism of the merger was voiced because members of the Wünschendorf local council saw no advantages from the merger. A citizens' petition against the merger was dismissed by the Gera Administrative Court. The community of Wunschendorf/Elster would leave the administrative community of Wunschendorf/Elster for the merger, which is reverting to its original name. The merger was decided in December 2023 with the Thuringian law for the voluntary reorganization of municipalities belonging to districts in 2024.
