= Berga (disambiguation) =

Berga is a town in Catalonia, Spain.

Berga may also refer to:

- Berga (surname)

== Places ==
- Berga (Thrace) or Berge, a colony of ancient Athens in Thrace
- Berga, Haninge Municipality, an estate and castle in Södermanland, Sweden
  - Berga Naval Base, a naval base on the Baltic Sea south of Stockholm
  - Berga Naval Training Schools
- Berga, Högsby Municipality, a locality in Småland, Sweden
- Berga, Linköping, a residential area in Östergötland, Sweden
- Berga, Saxony-Anhalt, a municipality in Saxony-Anhalt, Germany
- Berga, Thuringia, a town in Thuringia, Germany, and site of a World War II slave labor and concentration camp
  - Berga concentration camp
  - Berga: Soldiers of Another War, a documentary film about the camp by director Charles Guggenheim
- Berga-Wünschendorf, municipality in Thuringia, Germany
- Berga cicli, bicycles manufacture founded in 1913 by Giovanni Paulon in Vicenza, Italy
- Borgo Berga, a neighbourhood in Vicenza, Italy
  - Teatro Berga, a Roman theatre within the above neighbourhood
- Berga Kulle Nature Reserve

== Other ==
- Berġa, the Maltese word for auberge; see Auberges built by the Knights Hospitaller
