= Rückersdorf, Thuringia =

Rückersdorf
- Municipality
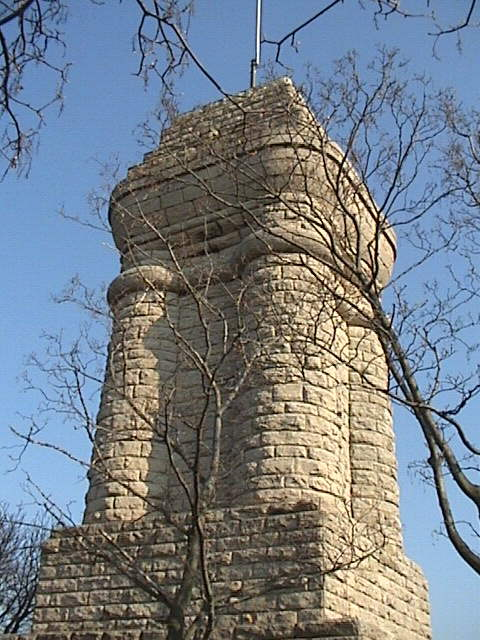

- Coat of arms

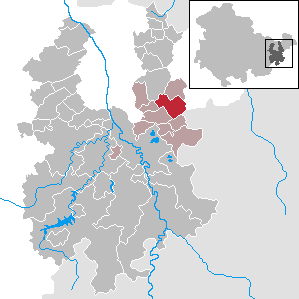
- Location of Rückersdorf within Greiz district
- Interactive map of Rückersdorf
- Location within Germany Location within Thuringia
- Coordinates: 50°49′N 12°13′E
- Country: Germany
- State: Thuringia
- District: Greiz
- Municipal assoc.: Ländereck
- Subdivisions: 3

Government
  - Mayor (2022–28): Axel Jakob

Area
  - Total: 12.45 km^{2} (4.81 sq mi)
- Elevation: 270–373 m (886–1,224 ft)

Population (2025-12-31)
  - Total: 674
  - Density: 54.1/km^{2} (140/sq mi)
- Time zone: UTC+01:00 (CET)
  - Summer (DST): UTC+02:00 (CEST)
- Postal codes: 07580
- Dialling codes: 036602
- Vehicle registration: GRZ

Rückersdorf (German pronunciation: [ˈʁʏkɐsdɔʁf]) is a municipality in the eastern part of the Thuringian landkreis of Greiz and belongs to the Verwaltungsgemeinschaft of Ländereck.

== Geography ==
=== Neighboring Communities ===
Nearby municipalities are Braunichswalde, Hilbersdorf, Kauern, Linda bei Weida, Paitzdorf, and the City of Ronneburg in the Landkreis of Greiz; Heukewalde and Jonaswalde in the Landkreis of Altenburger Land; as well as the City of Crimmitschau in the Saxon Landkreis of Zwickauer Land.

=== Municipal divisions ===
The municipality consists of the villages Rückersdorf, Haselbach and Reust.

== Culture and landmarks ==
Rückersdorf is part of the Diocese of Dresden-Meissen.

The municipality's Bismarck Tower, called the Reuster Turm, is located in Reust. From the site there is a good view of the town and the surrounding countryside. The Reuster Turm is opened on the weekends from Easter to the end of October

== Education ==
Rückersdorf is the location of its Verwaltungsgemeinschaft's elementary school.
