= Ronneburg, Thuringia =

Town in Greiz district, Thuringia, Germany

Ronneburg
- Town
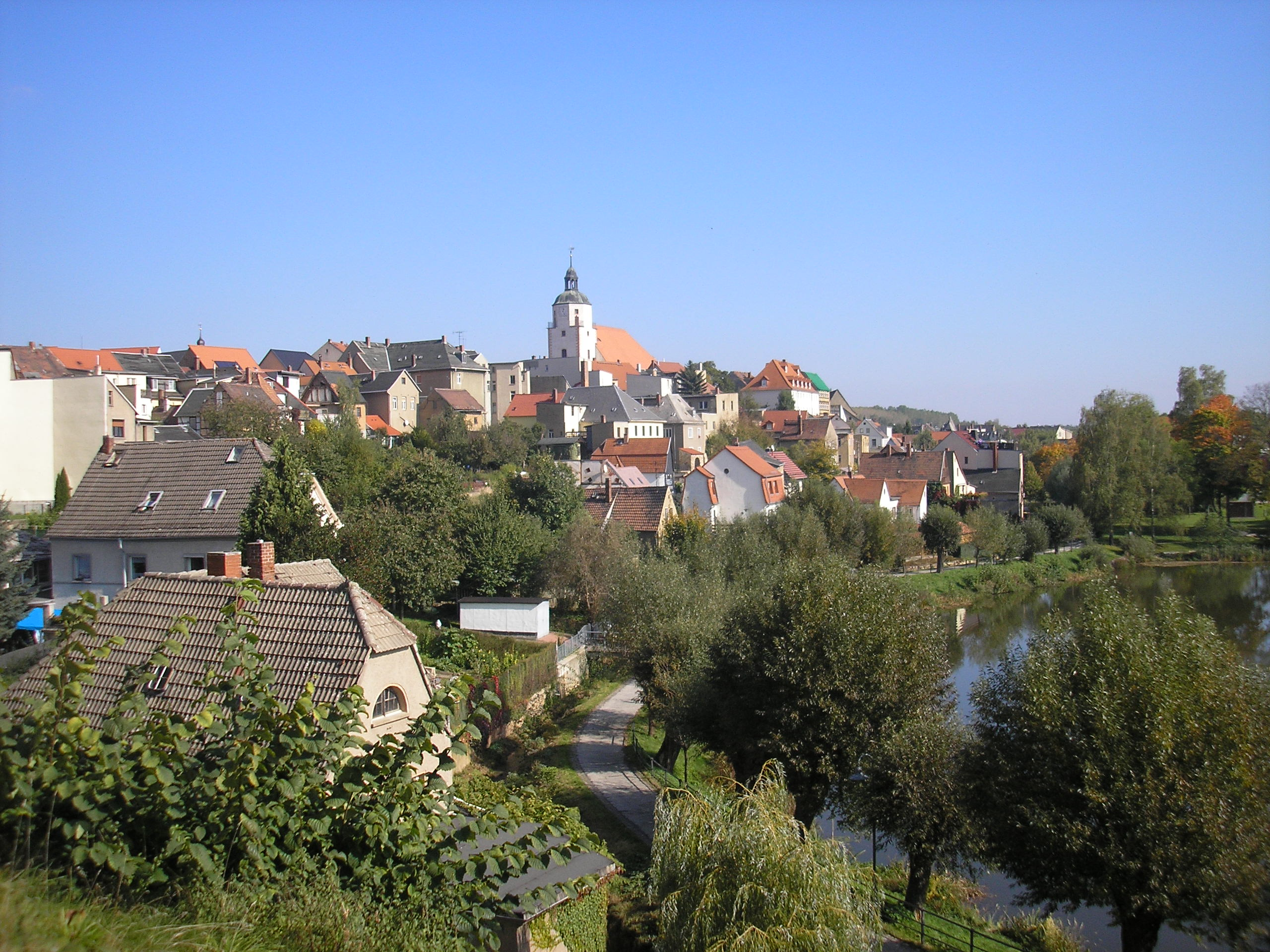
- Old town of Ronneburg

- Coat of arms

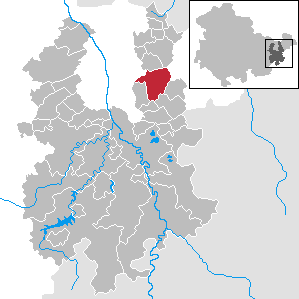
- Location of Ronneburg within Greiz district
- Interactive map of Ronneburg
- Location within Germany Location within Thuringia
- Coordinates: 50°51′49″N 12°10′51″E
- Country: Germany
- State: Thuringia
- District: Greiz
- Subdivisions: 4

Government
  - Mayor (2024–30): André Rüderisch

Area
  - Total: 19.13 km^{2} (7.39 sq mi)
- Elevation: 280 m (920 ft)

Population (2025-12-31)
  - Total: 4,971
  - Density: 259.9/km^{2} (673.0/sq mi)
- Time zone: UTC+01:00 (CET)
  - Summer (DST): UTC+02:00 (CEST)
- Postal codes: 07580
- Dialling codes: 036602
- Vehicle registration: GRZ
- Website: www.ronneburg.de

Ronneburg (German: [ˈʁɔnəbʊʁk]) is a town in the district of Greiz, in Thuringia, Germany. It is situated 7 km east of Gera.

Neighboring municipalities are Großenstein, Hilbersdorf, Kauern, Korbußen, Paitzdorf and Rückersdorf in the district of Greiz, the city of Gera, and Löbichau and Posterstein in the district of Altenburger Land.

== History ==
Ronneburg was mentioned for the first time in 1209 as in the possession of the governors of Weida; was from 1244 in the possession of the governors of Plauen; and in 1304 received town rights. In 1327 Heinrich Reuß von Plauen signed the "Ronneburg Agreement" with other overseers to protect the town against the House of Wettin. Nevertheless, after the ensuing war Ronneburg was part of Vogtland. In 1517 Ronneburg became the property of the Wildenfels family, in 1548 the Dukes of Saxony and in 1826 the Duchy of Saxe-Altenburg.

In 1766 the first mineral springs, which had been discovered 100 years previously, were developed. However, the spa lost its significance before the start of uranium mining by the SDAG bismuth in 1953.

Regionally important, but also relevant from certain economic and social history is the Ronneburg's Schnallensturm (buckle storm) of 1841, an uprising of the Ronneburg weavers against the increasing automation of their trade. The occasion was the attempt by the company Hennig & Volcker to use mechanical looms, which led to their destruction by the angry hand weavers.

Within the German Empire (1871–1918), Ronneburg was part of the Duchy of Saxe-Altenburg.
