= Döhlen =

Döhlen is may refer to the municipal subdivisions:

- Döhlen (Freital), Freital (Saxony, Germany)
- Döhlen (Markranstädt), Markranstädt (Saxony, Germany)
- Döhlen (Seelitz), Seelitz (Saxony, Germany)

== See also ==
- Göhren-Döhlen
- Von Dohlen
