= Merkendorf =

Merkendorf may refer to the following places:

- Merkendorf, Bavaria, a town in Bavaria, Germany
- Merkendorf, Thuringia, a municipality in Thuringia, Germany
- Merkendorf, Austria, a municipality in Styria, Austria
- Merkendorf (Schollach), a village in the municipality of Schollach, Lower Austria
