= Linda bei Weida =

- Municipality
- Coat of arms

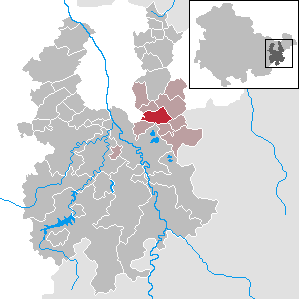
- Location of Linda bei Weida within Greiz district
- Interactive map of Linda bei Weida
- Location within Germany Location within Thuringia
- Coordinates: 50°48′N 12°12′E
- Country: Germany
- State: Thuringia
- District: Greiz
- Municipal assoc.: Ländereck

Government
  - Mayor (2022–28): Alexander Zill

Area
  - Total: 8.81 km^{2} (3.40 sq mi)
- Elevation: 318 m (1,043 ft)

Population (2025-12-31)
  - Total: 416
  - Density: 47.2/km^{2} (122/sq mi)
- Time zone: UTC+01:00 (CET)
  - Summer (DST): UTC+02:00 (CEST)
- Postal codes: 07580
- Dialling codes: 036608
- Vehicle registration: GRZ
- Website: www.gemeinde-linda.de

Linda bei Weida is a German municipality in the Thuringian district of Greiz. It belongs to the Verwaltungsgemeinschaft of Ländereck. Linda is part of the Roman Catholic Diocese of Dresden-Meissen.

== Geography ==
The municipality consists of the villages Linda and Pohlen.

Communities near Linda are Berga (Elster), Braunichswalde, Endschütz, Gauern, Hilbersdorf, and Rückersdorf in the Landkreis of Greiz; as well as the free city of Gera.
