= 1919 Saxe-Altenburg state election =

German state election

The 1919 Saxe-Altenburg state election was held on 26 January 1919 to elect the 40 members of the Landtag of Saxe-Altenburg.

== Results ==
Party	Votes	%	Seats
Social Democratic Party of Germany	58,979	58.55	24
German Democratic Party	24,820	24.64	10
German National People's Party	16,940	16.82	6
Total	100,739	100.00	40
Registered voters/turnout	125,536	–	
Source: Elections in the Weimar Republic,
