= Endschütz =

Municipality in Thuringia, Germany

- Municipality
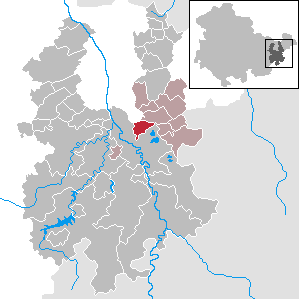
- Location of Endschütz within Greiz district
- Interactive map of Endschütz
- Location within Germany Location within Thuringia
- Coordinates: 50°47′N 12°8′E
- Country: Germany
- State: Thuringia
- District: Greiz
- Municipal assoc.: Ländereck

Government
  - Mayor (2022–28): Heino Vetterlein

Area
  - Total: 5.28 km^{2} (2.04 sq mi)
- Elevation: 279 m (915 ft)

Population (2025-12-31)
  - Total: 323
  - Density: 61.2/km^{2} (158/sq mi)
- Time zone: UTC+01:00 (CET)
  - Summer (DST): UTC+02:00 (CEST)
- Postal codes: 07570
- Dialling codes: 036603
- Vehicle registration: GRZ

Endschütz is a German municipality in the Thuringian district of Greiz. It belongs to the Verwaltungsgemeinschaft of Ländereck.

== Geography ==
=== Neighboring municipalities ===
Communities near Endschütz include the City of Berga (Elster), Linda bei Weida, and Wünschendorf/Elster; as well as the free city of Gera.

=== Municipal subdivisions ===
Endschütz has only one large subdivision, Letzendorf.
