= Hilbersdorf =

- Municipality
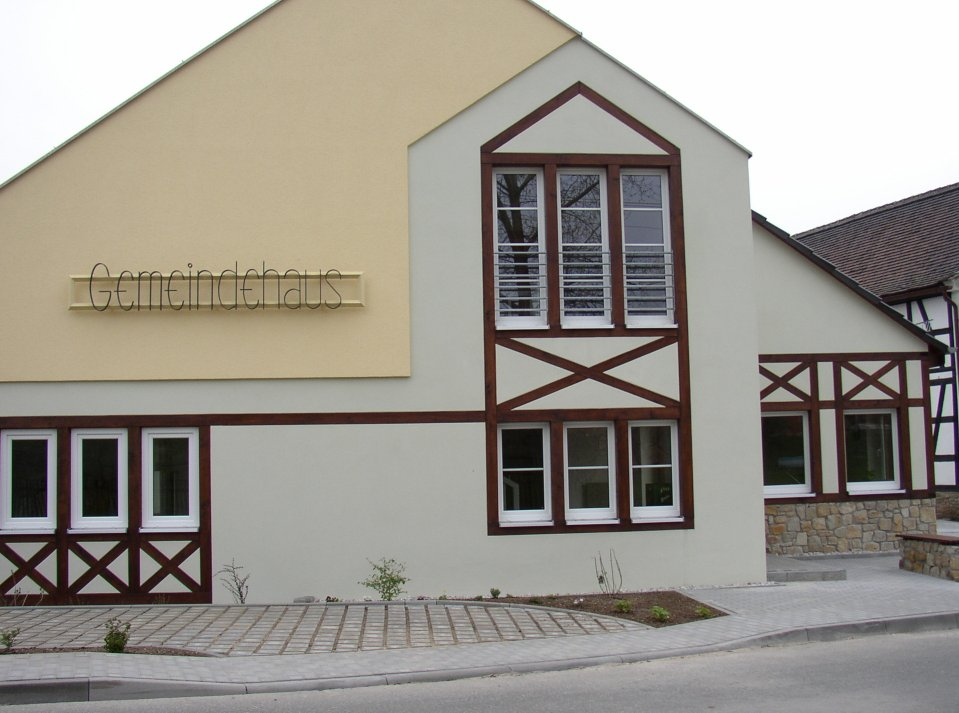

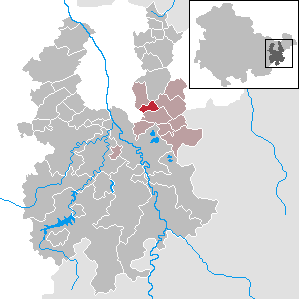
- Location of Hilbersdorf within Greiz district
- Interactive map of Hilbersdorf
- Location within Germany Location within Thuringia
- Coordinates: 50°49′N 12°9′E
- Country: Germany
- State: Thuringia
- District: Greiz
- Municipal assoc.: Ländereck
- Subdivisions: 2 Ortsteile

Government
  - Mayor (2022–28): Rainer Vogel

Area
  - Total: 4.01 km^{2} (1.55 sq mi)
- Elevation: 300 m (980 ft)

Population (2025-12-31)
  - Total: 194
  - Density: 48.4/km^{2} (125/sq mi)
- Time zone: UTC+01:00 (CET)
  - Summer (DST): UTC+02:00 (CEST)
- Postal codes: 07580
- Dialling codes: 036602
- Vehicle registration: GRZ

Hilbersdorf is a German municipality in the Thuringian district of Greiz. It belongs to the Verwaltungsgemeinschaft of Ländereck and lies in upper Wipsetal.

== Geography ==
From Hilbersdorf, one can reach Gera, Linda bei Weida, and Ronneburg in only a few minutes of driving. None of its neighboring communities are more than 10 km away.

=== Neighboring municipalities ===
Communities near Hilbersdorf are Kauern, Linda, Rückersdorf, and the City of Ronneburg in the Landkreis of Greiz; as well as the Free City of Gera.

=== Municipal arrangement ===
Hilbersdorf has two subdivisions: Hilbersdorf and Rußdorf.

== History ==
It is believed that the founding and settlement of the Mildenfurth Cloister at Wünschendorf occurred in the twelfth century. During its turbulent history, the villagers have belonged to Saxony, to Altenburg, and finally to Thuringia. Within the German Empire (1871-1918), Hilbersdorf was divided between four states, with parts of it belonging to the Duchy of Saxe-Altenburg, the Grand Duchy of Saxe-Weimar-Eisenach, the Principality of Reuss-Gera and the Kingdom of Saxony. From 1952 on, the community belonged to the Bezirk of Gera as well as to the Landkreis of the same name. In 1990, the Bezirk Gera was transferred to Thuringia. Subsequently, in 1994, the Kreise in Thuringia were reorganized, with Hilbersdorf going as a result to the Landkreis of Greiz.

== Culture and landmarks ==
Despite the immediate proximity of the Soviet-German Bismuth Co.'s slag heap, it is still possible have a pleasant hike along the Wispe in the direction of Liebschwitz and north to the Reuster Berg. Both the European Long-distance path E11 and the Thuringian Path pass through Rußdorf.
