= Reichstadt =

Reichstadt may refer to

- Reichstadt Agreement, an 1876 pact between Austria-Hungary and Russia
- The German name for Zákupy, a town in the Czech Republic
- Reichstädt, a municipality in Thuringia, Germany

== See also ==
- Duke of Reichstadt
- Reichsstadt
- Reichstag (disambiguation)
