= Franz Köcher =

Franz Köcher (27 December 1916, in Auma – 18 November 2002, in Berlin) was an influential Assyriologist and medical historian.

== Life and work ==
Born in Thuringia, Franz Köcher spent most of his scientific career in Berlin. He is primarily known for his magnum opus "Babylonisch-assyrische Medizin in Texten und Untersuchungen" (BAM). After finishing high school in Gera in 1936, Köcher did his undergraduate work in Ancient History, Near Eastern Philology (Orientalische Philologie) and Philosophy at the Friedrich-Schiller-Universität of Jena. His studies were interrupted by his conscription into the Wehrmacht from October 1938 until the end of World War II. During this time he did manage to attend one semester in the winter of 1941/42 at the Friedrich-Wilhelms-University zu Berlin. After being taken as a prisoner of war by the US Army, he was released after a few weeks and worked as a teacher's assistant, until the University reopened in 1946 and Köcher was able to resume his studies. It was at this time that his teacher Erich Ebeling started to have a decisive impact on Köcher's scientific work.

Ebeling was Köcher’s doctoral advisor for his doctorate, which was awarded in Assyriology, Near Eastern Philology (Orientalische Philologie) and Philosophy in March 1949. The subject of his dissertation was "Incantations against the demoness Lamaštu" (Beschwörungen gegen die Dämonin Lamaštu). From May 1949 on, Köcher first worked as a research assistant and later, beginning in October 1952, as a research associate at the Institute for Oriental Studies (Institut für Orientforschung) of the Deutsche Akademie der Wissenschaften zu Berlin. Due to the construction of the Berlin Wall in 1961, he was forced to abandon his work, since he lived in West Berlin and the Akademie was in the east. Because of his relentless work in the years prior to these events, Köcher had already laid the foundations of his afore mentioned magnum opus. His talent for making hand copies of cuneiform tables quickly became apparent when he assisted Erich Ebeling with his volume "Literarische Keilschrifttexte aus Assur" in 1953. Köcher was introduced to cuneiform medicine through, among others, the work on Ebeling's "Keilschrifttexte zur assyrisch-babylonischen Drogen- und Pflanzenheilkunde" in 1955, which was mostly focused on the pharmacological series URU AN.NA. He kept working on the series even long after his retirement.

Thanks to a scholarship awarded to him by the Deutsche Forschungsgemeinschaft, he was able to continue his work on cuneiform medical texts from December 1961 onwards. In May 1963 Köcher became a research associate at the Institute for the History of Medicine (Institut für Geschichte der Medizin) at the Freie Universität Berlin, where he would spend the remaining nineteen years of his career. After Köcher's habilitation in January 1967, he was granted the venia legendi by the Freie Universität. Until his retirement in March 1983, he was a very active and dedicated teacher who had significant influence on many young physicians, historians and assyriologists alike.

His magnum opus, "Die Babylonisch-Assyrische Medizin in Texten und Untersuchungen (BAM), was of paramount importance for Köcher throughout his entire career and is until today among the most important publications for the study of ancient Near Eastern medicine. Volumes 1 and 2 were published in 1963, volume 3 in 1964, volume 4 in 1971 and the volume 5 and in the year 1980. Volumes 7 and 8 are the work of Markham J. Geller and were published in 2005 and 2015 respectively.
