= Auma-Weidatal =

- Town
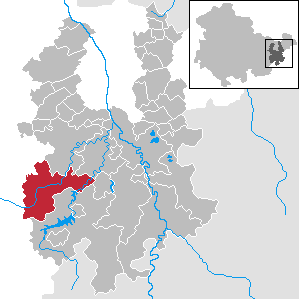
- Location of Auma-Weidatal within Greiz district
- Interactive map of Auma-Weidatal
- Location within Germany Location within Thuringia
- Coordinates: 50°42′N 11°54′E
- Country: Germany
- State: Thuringia
- District: Greiz

Government
  - Mayor (2024–30): Dirk Rüdiger

Area
  - Total: 55.91 km^{2} (21.59 sq mi)
- Elevation: 394 m (1,293 ft)

Population (2025-12-31)
  - Total: 3,324
  - Density: 59.45/km^{2} (154.0/sq mi)
- Time zone: UTC+01:00 (CET)
  - Summer (DST): UTC+02:00 (CEST)
- Postal codes: 07955
- Dialling codes: 036626
- Vehicle registration: GRZ

Auma-Weidatal (German pronunciation: [ˈaʊma ˈvaɪdaˌtaːl]) is a town in the district of Greiz, in Thuringia, Germany. It was named after the town Auma and the river Weida, that flows through the municipality. It was formed on 1 December 2011 by the merger of the former municipalities Auma, Braunsdorf, Göhren-Döhlen, Staitz and Wiebelsdorf. Since January 1996, these and three other municipalities had cooperated in the Verwaltungsgemeinschaft ("collective municipality") Auma-Weidatal. This Verwaltungsgemeinschaft was disbanded on 1 December 2011. The seat of the municipality and of the former Verwaltungsgemeinschaft is in Auma.
