= Kauern =

- Municipality
- Coat of arms

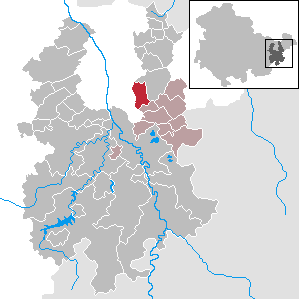
- Location of Kauern within Greiz district
- Interactive map of Kauern
- Location within Germany Location within Thuringia
- Coordinates: 50.845°N 12.145°E
- Country: Germany
- State: Thuringia
- District: Greiz
- Municipal assoc.: Ländereck
- Subdivisions: 3

Government
  - Mayor (2021–27): Jens Schneider

Area
  - Total: 8.32 km^{2} (3.21 sq mi)
- Elevation: 285 m (935 ft)

Population (2025-12-31)
  - Total: 444
  - Density: 53.4/km^{2} (138/sq mi)
- Time zone: UTC+01:00 (CET)
  - Summer (DST): UTC+02:00 (CEST)
- Postal codes: 07554
- Dialling codes: 036602
- Vehicle registration: GRZ
- Website: www.kauern.de

Kauern is a German municipality in the Thuringian Landkreis of Greiz. It belongs to the Verwaltungsgemeinschaft of Ländereck.

== Geography ==
=== Neighboring municipalities ===
Communities near Kauern are Hilbersdorf and Ronneburg in the Landkreis of Greiz, as well as the Free City of Gera.

=== Municipal arrangement ===
Kauern has two subdivisions: Lichtenberg und Loitzsch.

== History ==
Kauern is first mentioned in writing in 1465, when the Lord of Rudenitz was invested with the manor of Kauern. The village of Kauern belonged to the Dukes of Saxe-Altenburg and possessed a tight bond to the nearby city of Ronneburg that developed over the years.

In 1958, the SDAG Wismut began the construction of a uranium ore open-pit mine in Lichtenberg. By 1976 it had formed a 240 meter deep hole. Then the extraction of uranium in the mine was discontinued, because expansion was impossible due to the proximity of Ronneburg and to the Schmirchau mine. In 1990, the mine was partially filled with material from the nearby pits. When Federal Garden Show is held nearby in 2007, it should be completely filled up and integrated into the new landscape of Ronneburg.
