= Bethenhausen =

- Municipality
- Coat of arms

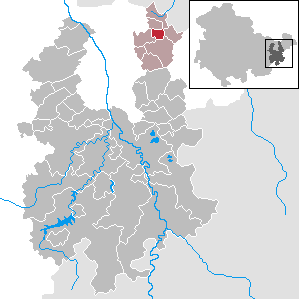
- Location of Bethenhausen within Greiz district
- Interactive map of Bethenhausen
- Location within Germany Location within Thuringia
- Coordinates: 50°55′44″N 12°11′50″E
- Country: Germany
- State: Thuringia
- District: Greiz
- Municipal assoc.: Am Brahmetal
- Subdivisions: 2

Government
  - Mayor (2020–26): Sebastian Saupe

Area
  - Total: 3.08 km^{2} (1.19 sq mi)
- Elevation: 255–292 m (837–958 ft)

Population (2025-12-31)
  - Total: 210
  - Density: 68/km^{2} (180/sq mi)
- Time zone: UTC+01:00 (CET)
  - Summer (DST): UTC+02:00 (CEST)
- Postal codes: 07554
- Dialling codes: 036695
- Vehicle registration: GRZ
- Website: www.vg-brahmetal.de

Bethenhausen is a municipality in the district of Greiz, in Thuringia, Germany. The town is member of the municipal association Am Brahmetal.
