= Harth-Pöllnitz =

- Municipality
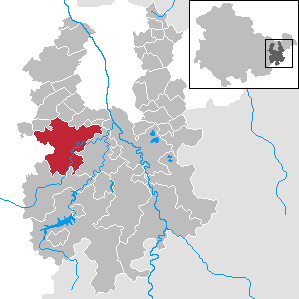
- Location of Harth-Pöllnitz within Greiz district
- Interactive map of Harth-Pöllnitz
- Location within Germany Location within Thuringia
- Coordinates: 50°46′0″N 11°59′24″E
- Country: Germany
- State: Thuringia
- District: Greiz

Government
  - Mayor (2021–27): Gottfried Vorsatz

Area
  - Total: 55.36 km^{2} (21.37 sq mi)
- Elevation: 320 m (1,050 ft)

Population (2025-12-31)
  - Total: 2,622
  - Density: 47.36/km^{2} (122.7/sq mi)
- Time zone: UTC+01:00 (CET)
  - Summer (DST): UTC+02:00 (CEST)
- Postal codes: 07570
- Dialling codes: 036607
- Vehicle registration: GRZ
- Website: www.harth-poellnitz.de

Harth-Pöllnitz is a municipality in the district of Greiz, in Thuringia, Germany.
