= Hirschfeld, Thuringia =

Hirschfeld
- Municipality
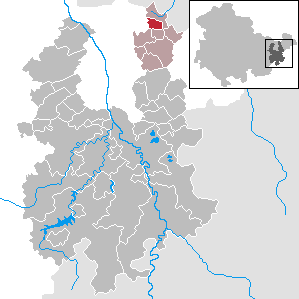
- Location of Hirschfeld within Greiz district
- Interactive map of Hirschfeld
- Location within Germany Location within Thuringia
- Coordinates: 50°56′29″N 12°11′19″E
- Country: Germany
- State: Thuringia
- District: Greiz
- Municipal assoc.: Am Brahmetal

Government
  - Mayor (2022–28): Ingo Giebner

Area
  - Total: 3.74 km^{2} (1.44 sq mi)
- Elevation: 265–292 m (869–958 ft)

Population (2025-12-31)
  - Total: 93
  - Density: 25/km^{2} (64/sq mi)
- Time zone: UTC+01:00 (CET)
  - Summer (DST): UTC+02:00 (CEST)
- Postal codes: 07554
- Dialling codes: 036695
- Vehicle registration: GRZ
- Website: www.vg-brahmetal.de

Hirschfeld (German pronunciation: [ˈhɪʁʃfɛlt]) is a municipality in the district of Greiz, in Thuringia, Germany. The town is member of the municipal association Am Brahmetal.
