= Hohenleuben =

- Town
- Coat of arms

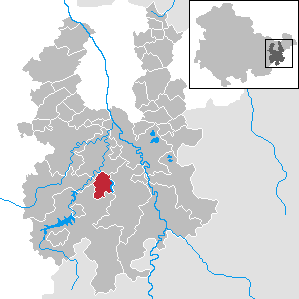
- Location of Hohenleuben within Greiz district
- Interactive map of Hohenleuben
- Location within Germany Location within Thuringia
- Coordinates: 50°43′N 12°3′E
- Country: Germany
- State: Thuringia
- District: Greiz

Government
  - Mayor (2021–27): Stefanie Soch

Area
  - Total: 9.53 km^{2} (3.68 sq mi)
- Elevation: 395 m (1,296 ft)

Population (2025-12-31)
  - Total: 1,373
  - Density: 144/km^{2} (373/sq mi)
- Time zone: UTC+01:00 (CET)
  - Summer (DST): UTC+02:00 (CEST)
- Postal codes: 07958
- Dialling codes: 036622
- Vehicle registration: GRZ

Hohenleuben (German pronunciation: [ˌhoːənˈlɔʏbn̩]) is a town in the district of Greiz, in Thuringia, Germany. It is situated 12 km northwest of Greiz, and 19 km south of Gera.

== History ==
Within the German Empire (1871-1918), Hohenleuben was part of the Principality of Reuss-Gera.
