= Schwaara =

- Municipality
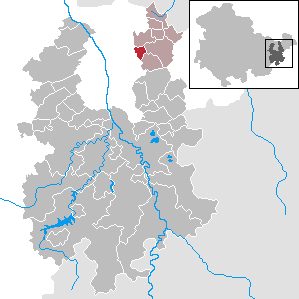
- Location of Schwaara within Greiz district
- Interactive map of Schwaara
- Location within Germany Location within Thuringia
- Coordinates: 50°54′11″N 12°8′34″E
- Country: Germany
- State: Thuringia
- District: Greiz
- Municipal assoc.: Am Brahmetal

Government
  - Mayor (2022–28): Christian Haßmann

Area
  - Total: 3.56 km^{2} (1.37 sq mi)
- Elevation: 240–286 m (787–938 ft)

Population (2025-12-31)
  - Total: 130
  - Density: 37/km^{2} (95/sq mi)
- Time zone: UTC+01:00 (CET)
  - Summer (DST): UTC+02:00 (CEST)
- Postal codes: 07554
- Dialling codes: 0365
- Vehicle registration: GRZ
- Website: www.elektro-matthes.de/vg/sch.htm

Schwaara is a municipality in the district of Greiz, in Thuringia, Germany. The town is member of the municipal association Am Brahmetal.
