= Kraftsdorf =

- Municipality
- Coat of arms

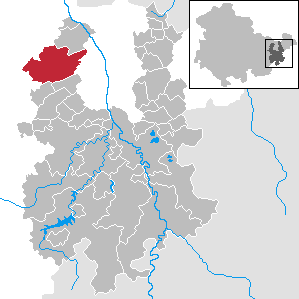
- Location of Kraftsdorf within Greiz district
- Interactive map of Kraftsdorf
- Location within Germany Location within Thuringia
- Coordinates: 50°52′33″N 11°54′50″E
- Country: Germany
- State: Thuringia
- District: Greiz

Government
  - Mayor (2021–27): Bernd Becker

Area
  - Total: 41.21 km^{2} (15.91 sq mi)
- Elevation: 270 m (890 ft)

Population (2025-12-31)
  - Total: 3,646
  - Density: 88.47/km^{2} (229.1/sq mi)
- Time zone: UTC+01:00 (CET)
  - Summer (DST): UTC+02:00 (CEST)
- Postal codes: 07586
- Dialling codes: 036606
- Vehicle registration: GRZ
- Website: www.kraftsdorf.de

Kraftsdorf is a municipality in the district of Greiz, in Thuringia, Germany. It is dispersed in different municipal units with their sub-set of hamlets:

- Kraftsdorf
  - Harpersdorf
  - Kraftsdorf
  - Oberndorf
- Niederndorf
  - Kaltenborn
  - Niederndorf
- Rüdersdorf
  - Grüna
  - Rüdersdorf (with Stübnitz)
- Töppeln
  - Mühlsdorf
  - Pörsdorf
  - Töppeln

== See also ==
- Media related to Kraftsdorf at Wikimedia Commons

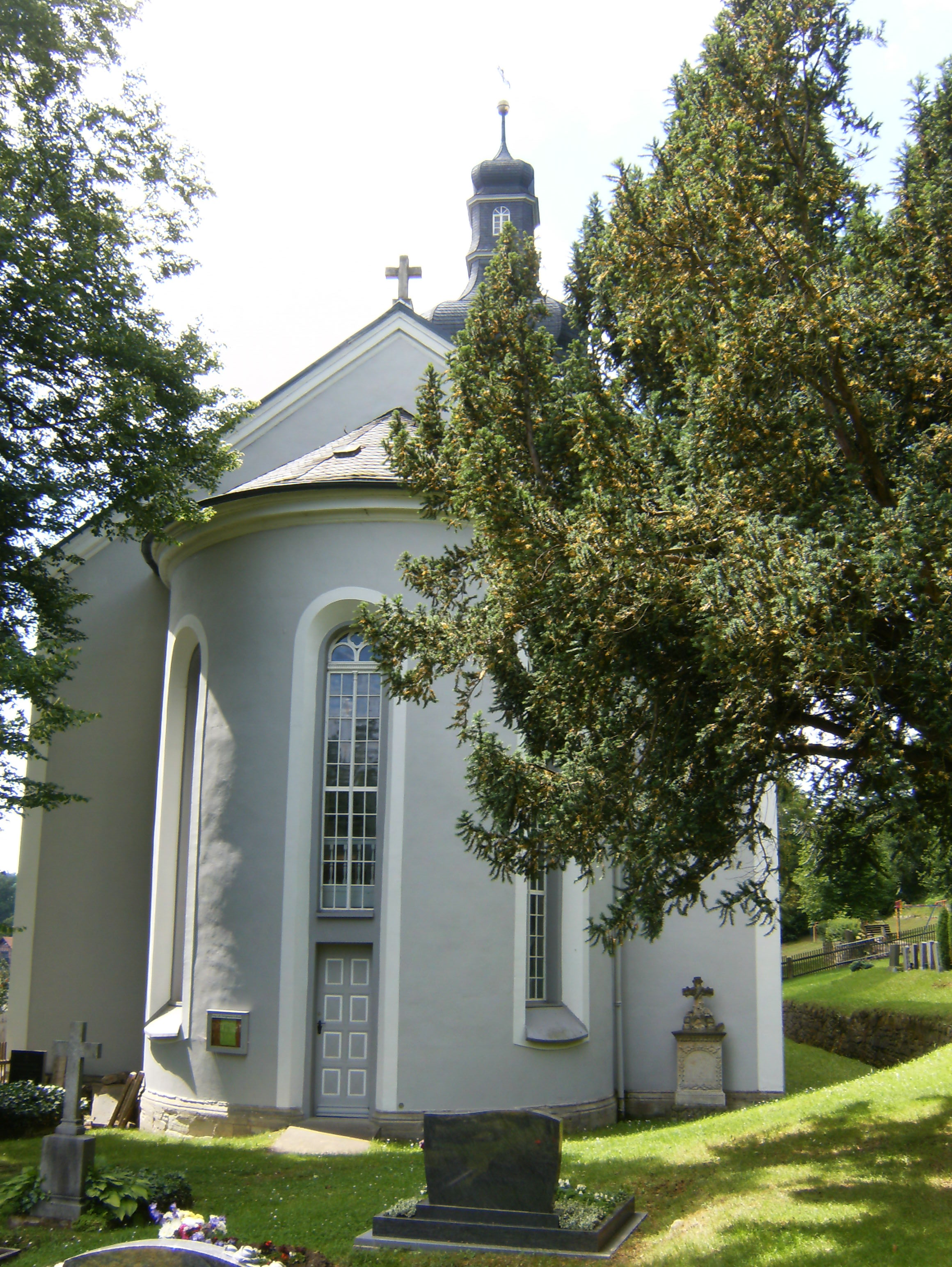
Church in Kraftsdorf
