= Pölzig =

- Municipality
- Coat of arms

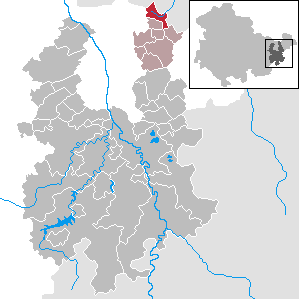
- Location of Pölzig within Greiz district
- Interactive map of Pölzig
- Location within Germany Location within Thuringia
- Coordinates: 50°57′9″N 12°11′52″E
- Country: Germany
- State: Thuringia
- District: Greiz
- Municipal assoc.: Am Brahmetal
- Subdivisions: 4

Government
  - Mayor (2022–28): Klaus-Frieder Heuzeroth

Area
  - Total: 7.75 km^{2} (2.99 sq mi)
- Elevation: 240–295 m (787–968 ft)

Population (2025-12-31)
  - Total: 1,060
  - Density: 137/km^{2} (354/sq mi)
- Time zone: UTC+01:00 (CET)
  - Summer (DST): UTC+02:00 (CEST)
- Postal codes: 07554
- Dialling codes: 036695
- Vehicle registration: GRZ
- Website: www.gemeinde-poelzig.de

Pölzig (German pronunciation: [ˈpœltsɪç]) is a municipality in the district of Greiz, in Thuringia, Germany. It is member of the municipal association Am Brahmetal.
