= Brahmenau =

- Municipality
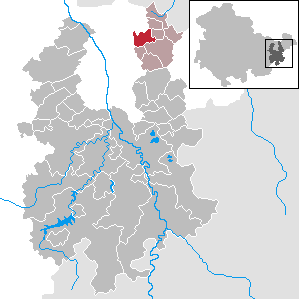
- Location of Brahmenau within Greiz district
- Interactive map of Brahmenau
- Location within Germany Location within Thuringia
- Coordinates: 50°55′N 12°10′E
- Country: Germany
- State: Thuringia
- District: Greiz
- Municipal assoc.: Am Brahmetal
- Subdivisions: 3

Government
  - Mayor (2022–28): Willibald Garscha

Area
  - Total: 6.88 km^{2} (2.66 sq mi)
- Elevation: 220–290 m (720–950 ft)

Population (2025-12-31)
  - Total: 904
  - Density: 131/km^{2} (340/sq mi)
- Time zone: UTC+01:00 (CET)
  - Summer (DST): UTC+02:00 (CEST)
- Postal codes: 07554
- Dialling codes: 036695
- Vehicle registration: GRZ
- Website: www.vg-brahmetal.de/bra.htm

Brahmenau is a municipality in the district of Greiz, in Thuringia, Germany.
