= Staitz =

- Stadtteil of Auma-Weidatal
- Interactive map of Staitz
- Location within Germany Location within Thuringia
- Coordinates: 50°43′N 12°0′E
- Country: Germany
- State: Thuringia
- District: Greiz
- Town: Auma-Weidatal

Area
  - Total: 6.75 km^{2} (2.61 sq mi)
- Elevation: 365 m (1,198 ft)

Population (2010-12-31)
  - Total: 278
  - Density: 41.2/km^{2} (107/sq mi)
- Time zone: UTC+01:00 (CET)
  - Summer (DST): UTC+02:00 (CEST)
- Postal codes: 07950
- Dialling codes: 036622

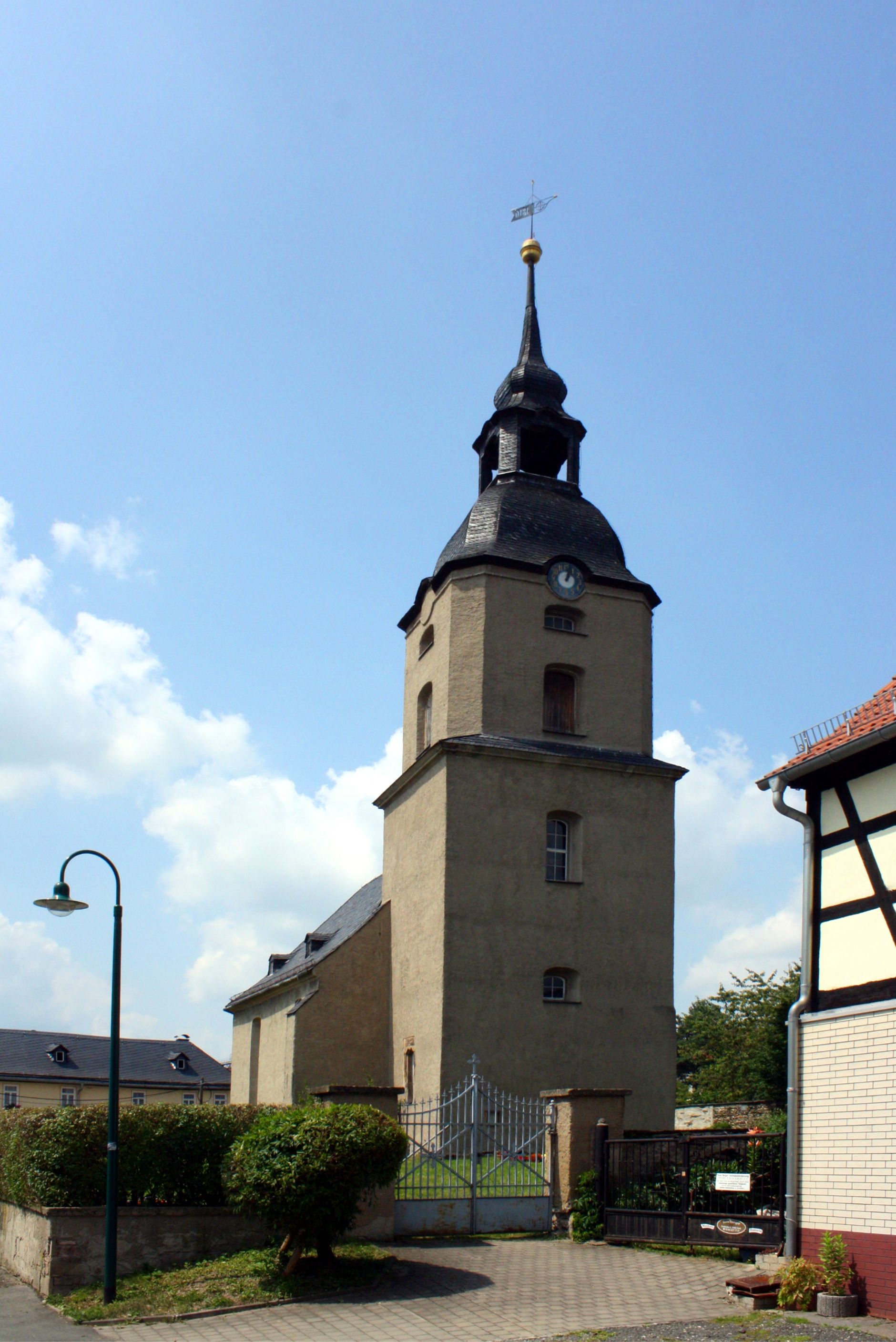
Church in Auma-Staitz near Greiz

Staitz is a village and a former municipality in the district of Greiz, in Thuringia, Germany. Since 1 December 2011, it is part of the municipality Auma-Weidatal.

Staitz is a small village in the district of Greiz in the German state of Thuringia, situated near the Weidatalsperre and within the present-day municipality of Auma-Weidatal. The settlement was first documented on 22 July 1283, when Heinrich the Elder, Vogt of Weida, confirmed a payment associated with Staitz to the Cronschwitz monastery. The village has a long agricultural and rural history, and its name is thought to derive from a Sorbian water-related word associated with a pond. A church was probably first built in 1521, while much of the village, including the church and school, was destroyed by a fire in 1812 and subsequently rebuilt. Staitz was an independent municipality until 1 December 2011, when it became part of Auma-Weidatal as part of a municipal reorganization.
