= Wiebelsdorf =

- Stadtteil of Auma-Weidatal
- Interactive map of Wiebelsdorf
- Location within Germany Location within Thuringia
- Coordinates: 50°43′N 11°57′E
- Country: Germany
- State: Thuringia
- District: Greiz
- Town: Auma-Weidatal

Area
  - Total: 7.26 km^{2} (2.80 sq mi)
- Elevation: 396 m (1,299 ft)

Population (2010-12-31)
  - Total: 259
  - Density: 35.7/km^{2} (92.4/sq mi)
- Time zone: UTC+01:00 (CET)
  - Summer (DST): UTC+02:00 (CEST)
- Postal codes: 07950
- Dialling codes: 036626

Wiebelsdorf is a village and a former municipality in the district of Greiz, in Thuringia, Germany. Since 1 December 2011, it is part of the town Auma-Weidatal.
