= Braunsdorf =

- Stadtteil of Auma-Weidatal
- Interactive map of Braunsdorf
- Location within Germany Location within Thuringia
- Coordinates: 50°44′N 11°55′E
- Country: Germany
- State: Thuringia
- District: Greiz
- Town: Auma-Weidatal

Area
  - Total: 6.18 km^{2} (2.39 sq mi)
- Elevation: 402 m (1,319 ft)

Population (2010-12-31)
  - Total: 230
  - Density: 37/km^{2} (96/sq mi)
- Time zone: UTC+01:00 (CET)
  - Summer (DST): UTC+02:00 (CEST)
- Postal codes: 07955
- Dialling codes: 036482
- Vehicle registration: GRZ

Braunsdorf is a village and a former municipality in the district of Greiz, in Thuringia, Germany. Since 1 December 2011 it has been part of the municipality Auma-Weidatal.
