= Ländereck =

- Verwaltungsgemeinschaft
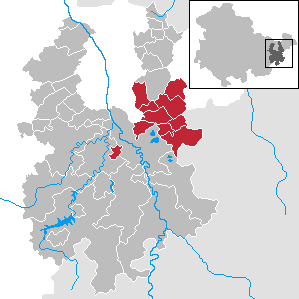
- Map of Greiz highlighting Ländereck
- Interactive map of Ländereck
- Location within Germany Location within Thuringia
- Coordinates: 50°48′N 12°13′E
- Country: Germany
- State: Thuringia
- District: Greiz
- Seat: Seelingstädt
- Subdivisions: 10 municipalities

Area
  - Total: 77.58 km^{2} (29.95 sq mi)

Population (2025-12-31)
  - Total: 4,432
  - Density: 57.13/km^{2} (148.0/sq mi)
- Time zone: UTC+01:00 (CET)
  - Summer (DST): UTC+02:00 (CEST)
- Website: www.vg-laendereck.de

Ländereck (between February 2013 and January 2024: Wünschendorf/Elster) is a Verwaltungsgemeinschaft ("collective municipality") in the district of Greiz, in Thuringia, Germany. The seat of the Verwaltungsgemeinschaft is in Seelingstädt.

The Verwaltungsgemeinschaft Ländereck consists of the following municipalities:

1. Braunichswalde
2. Endschütz
3. Gauern
4. Hilbersdorf
5. Kauern
6. Linda bei Weida
7. Paitzdorf
8. Rückersdorf
9. Seelingstädt
10. Teichwitz
