= Berga (surname) =

Berga is a surname. Notable people with the surname include:

- Ingmar Berga (born 17 July 1984), Dutch male marathon speed skater and inline speed skater
- Josep Berga i Boix (1837–1914), Spanish landscape painter
- Marina Isan Berga (born 1994), Spanish professional racing cyclist
- Max Bergå, Swedish talent agent and co-founder of Marion Vain
- Tatjana Berga (1944–2020), Latvian archaeologist and numismatist
- Carles Berga Vendrell (1945–2021), Catalan composer

== See also ==
- Berga (disambiguation)
- Bergman
