= Silberfeld =

- Stadtteil of Zeulenroda-Triebes
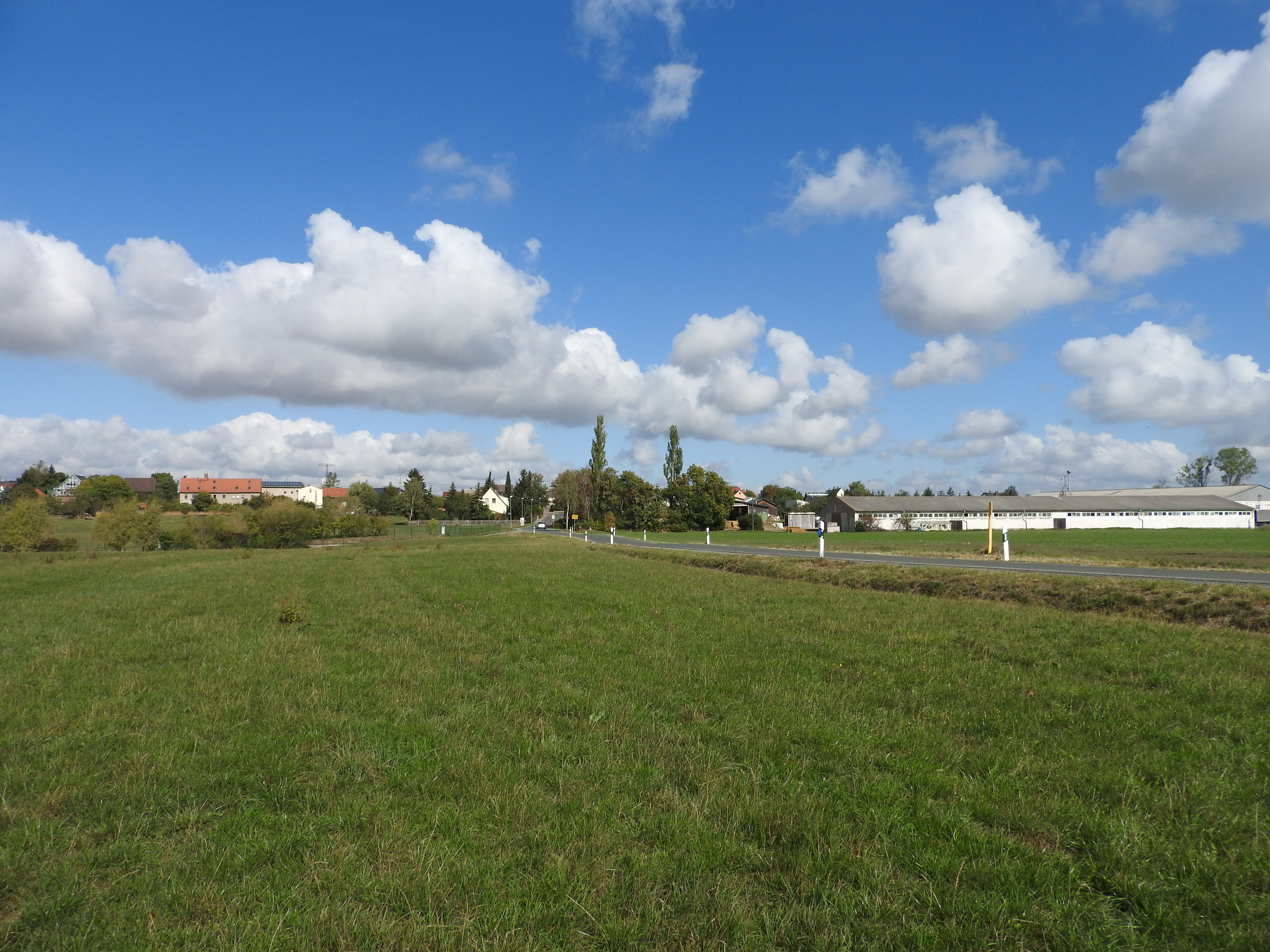
- View of Silberfeld in Thuringia
- Interactive map of Silberfeld
- Location within Germany Location within Thuringia
- Coordinates: 50°40′33″N 11°57′38″E
- Country: Germany
- State: Thuringia
- District: Greiz
- Town: Zeulenroda-Triebes

Area
  - Total: 2.13 km^{2} (0.82 sq mi)
- Elevation: 403 m (1,322 ft)

Population (2010-12-31)
  - Total: 104
  - Density: 48.8/km^{2} (126/sq mi)
- Time zone: UTC+01:00 (CET)
  - Summer (DST): UTC+02:00 (CEST)
- Postal codes: 07937
- Dialling codes: 036628

Silberfeld is a village and a former municipality in the district of Greiz, in Thuringia, Germany. Since 1 December 2011, it is part of the town Zeulenroda-Triebes.
