= Paitzdorf =

- Municipality
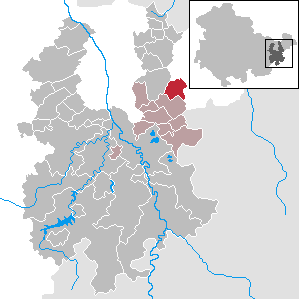
- Location of Paitzdorf within Greiz district
- Interactive map of Paitzdorf
- Location within Germany Location within Thuringia
- Coordinates: 50°51′N 12°13′E
- Country: Germany
- State: Thuringia
- District: Greiz
- Municipal assoc.: Ländereck

Government
  - Mayor (2022–28): Jörg Trillitzsch

Area
  - Total: 8.67 km^{2} (3.35 sq mi)
- Elevation: 275 m (902 ft)

Population (2025-12-31)
  - Total: 405
  - Density: 46.7/km^{2} (121/sq mi)
- Time zone: UTC+01:00 (CET)
  - Summer (DST): UTC+02:00 (CEST)
- Postal codes: 07580
- Dialling codes: 036602
- Vehicle registration: GRZ
- Website: paitzdorf.de

Paitzdorf (German pronunciation: [ˈpaɪtsdɔʁf]) is a German municipality in the Thuringian Landkreis of Greiz. It belongs to the Verwaltungsgemeinschaft of Ländereck.

== Geography ==
=== Neighboring municipalities ===
Communities near Paitzdorf are the City of Ronneburg and Rückersdorf in the Landkreis of Greiz; as well as Heukewalde and Posterstein in the Landkreis of Altenburger Land.

=== Municipal arrangement ===
Mennsdorf is Paitzdorf's only district.

== History ==
Paitzdorf was first mentioned in writing in 1290.

In 1837, around 140 Paitzdorfers left for America, seeking religious freedom. Along with immigrants from Saxony, they founded the communities of Altenburg, Frohna, Wittenberg, Dresden, and Paitzdorf on the Mississippi River in Missouri. This group would later found the Lutheran Church–Missouri Synod.

In 1963, Paitzdorf's windmill, erected in 1792, was torn down.
