= Zadelsdorf =

Neighbourhood of Zeulenroda-Triebes in Thuringia, Germany

- Stadtteil of Zeulenroda-Triebes
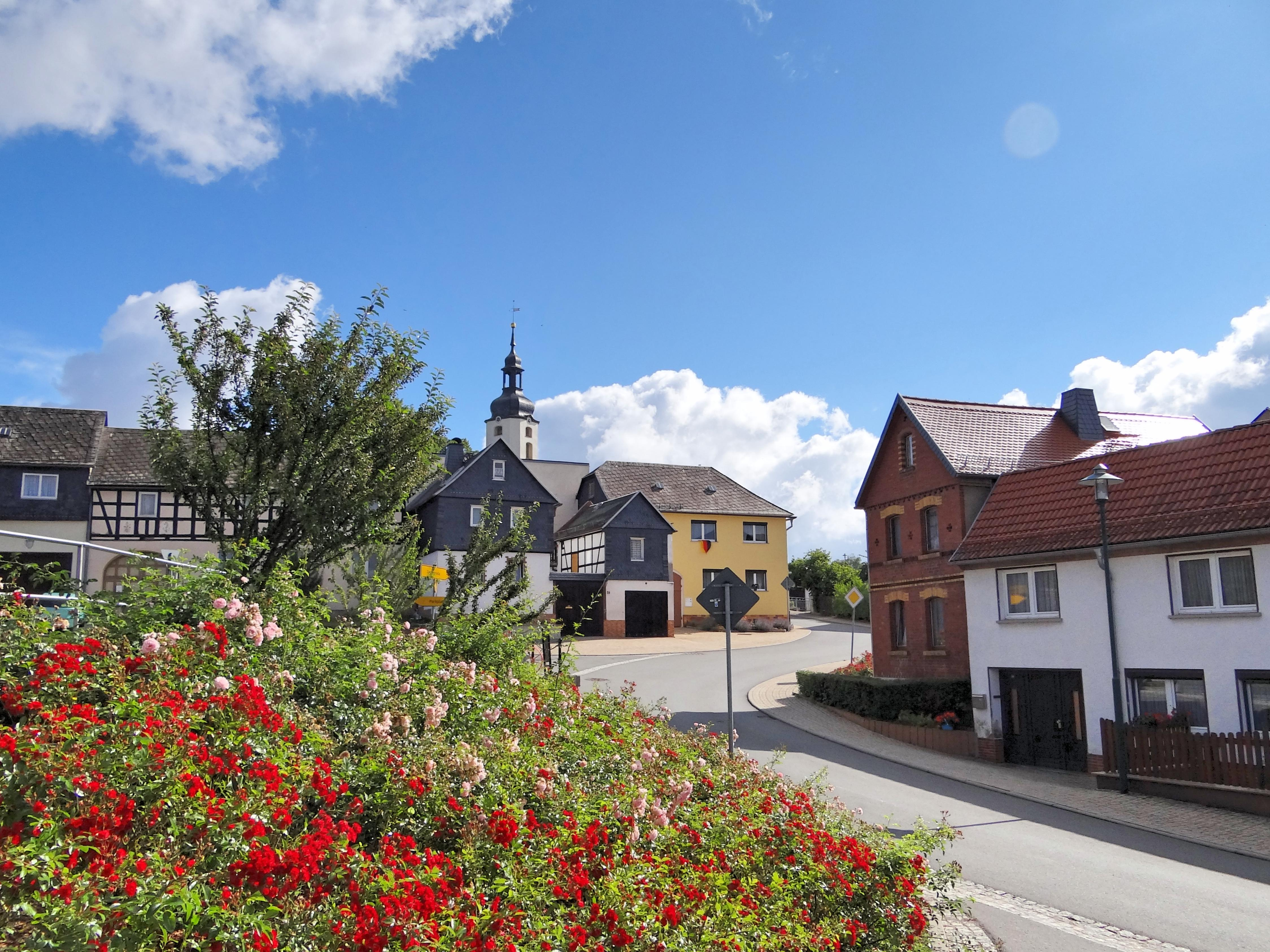
- Zadelsdorf, Germany
- Interactive map of Zadelsdorf
- Location within Germany Location within Thuringia
- Coordinates: 50°39′58″N 11°56′28″E
- Country: Germany
- State: Thuringia
- District: Greiz
- Town: Zeulenroda-Triebes

Area
  - Total: 5.77 km^{2} (2.23 sq mi)
- Elevation: 347 m (1,138 ft)

Population (2010-12-31)
  - Total: 140
  - Density: 24/km^{2} (63/sq mi)
- Time zone: UTC+01:00 (CET)
  - Summer (DST): UTC+02:00 (CEST)
- Postal codes: 07937
- Dialling codes: 036628

Zadelsdorf is a village and a former municipality in the district of Greiz, in Thuringia, Germany. Since 1 December 2011, it has been part of the town Zeulenroda-Triebes.
