= Am Brahmetal =

Municipality in Thuringia, Germany

- Verwaltungsgemeinschaft
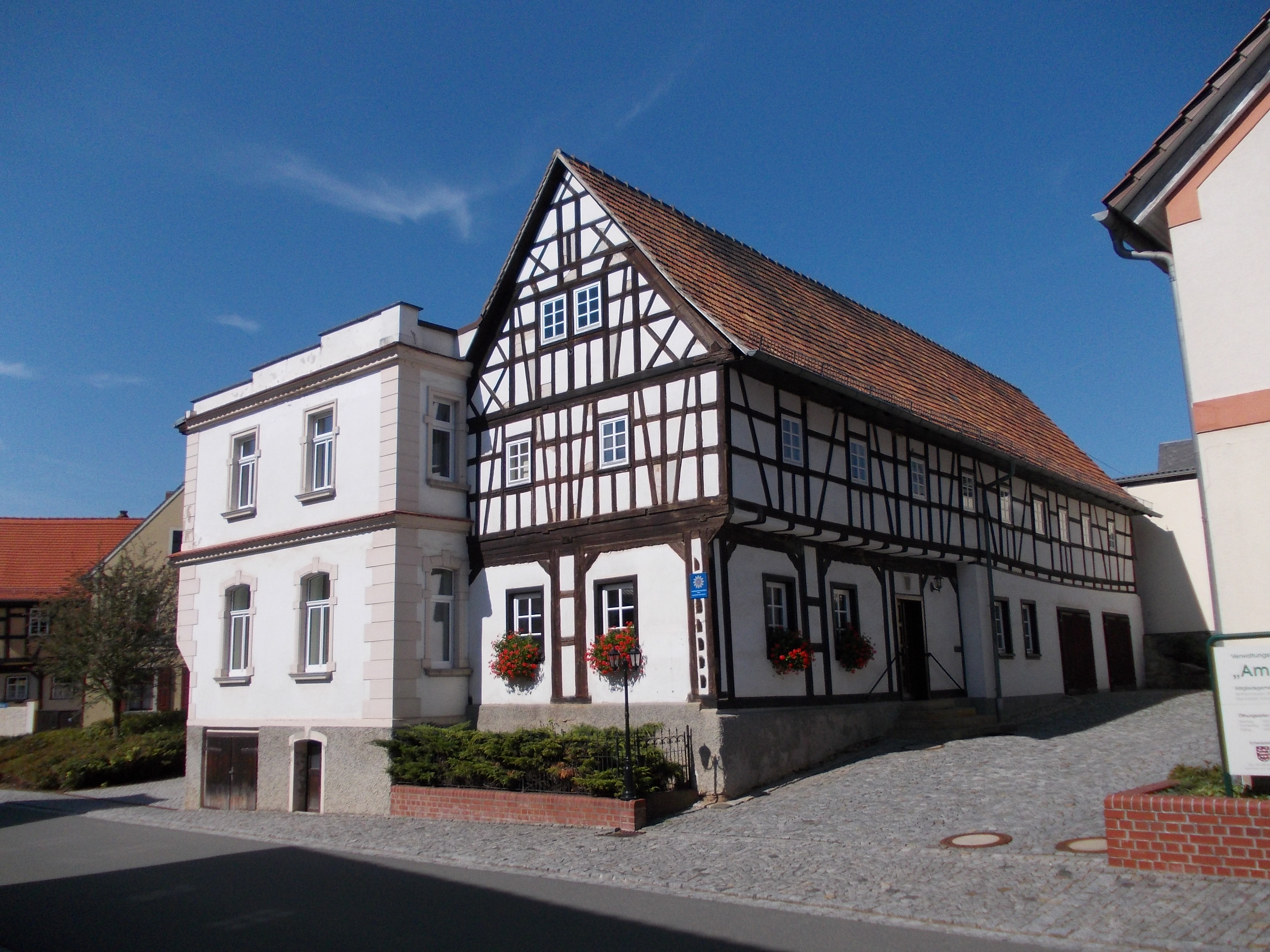
- The town hall in Großenstein

- Map of Greiz highlighting Am Brahmetal
- Interactive map of Am Brahmetal
- Location within Germany Location within Thuringia
- Coordinates: 50°54′N 12°12′E
- Country: Germany
- State: Thuringia
- District: Greiz
- Seat: Großenstein
- Subdivisions: 8 municipalities

Area
  - Total: 51.79 km^{2} (20.00 sq mi)

Population (2025-12-31)
  - Total: 4,295
  - Density: 82.93/km^{2} (214.8/sq mi)
- Time zone: UTC+01:00 (CET)
  - Summer (DST): UTC+02:00 (CEST)
- Website: www.vg-brahmetal.de

Am Brahmetal is a Verwaltungsgemeinschaft ("collective municipality") in the district of Greiz, in Thuringia, Germany. Since 1991 the seat of the Verwaltungsgemeinschaft is in Großenstein. In 1995 the name of the Verwaltungsgemeinschaft changed from Oberes Sprottetal to Am Brahmetal.

The Verwaltungsgemeinschaft Am Brahmetal consists of the following municipalities:

1. Bethenhausen
2. Brahmenau
3. Großenstein
4. Hirschfeld
5. Korbußen
6. Pölzig
7. Reichstädt
8. Schwaara
