= Großenstein =

- Municipality
- Coat of arms

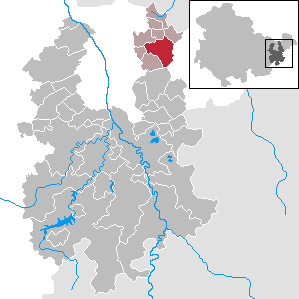
- Location of Großenstein within Greiz district
- Interactive map of Großenstein
- Location within Germany Location within Thuringia
- Coordinates: 50°54′N 12°12′E
- Country: Germany
- State: Thuringia
- District: Greiz
- Municipal assoc.: Am Brahmetal
- Subdivisions: 4

Government
  - Mayor (2022–28): Mario Richter

Area
  - Total: 14.47 km^{2} (5.59 sq mi)
- Elevation: 288 m (945 ft)

Population (2025-12-31)
  - Total: 1,169
  - Density: 80.79/km^{2} (209.2/sq mi)
- Time zone: UTC+01:00 (CET)
  - Summer (DST): UTC+02:00 (CEST)
- Postal codes: 07580
- Dialling codes: 036602
- Vehicle registration: GRZ
- Website: www.vg-brahmetal.de

Großenstein is a municipality in the district of Greiz, in Thuringia, Germany. The town is member of the municipal association Am Brahmetal.
