= Wünschendorf/Elster =

- Stadtteil of Berga-Wünschendorf
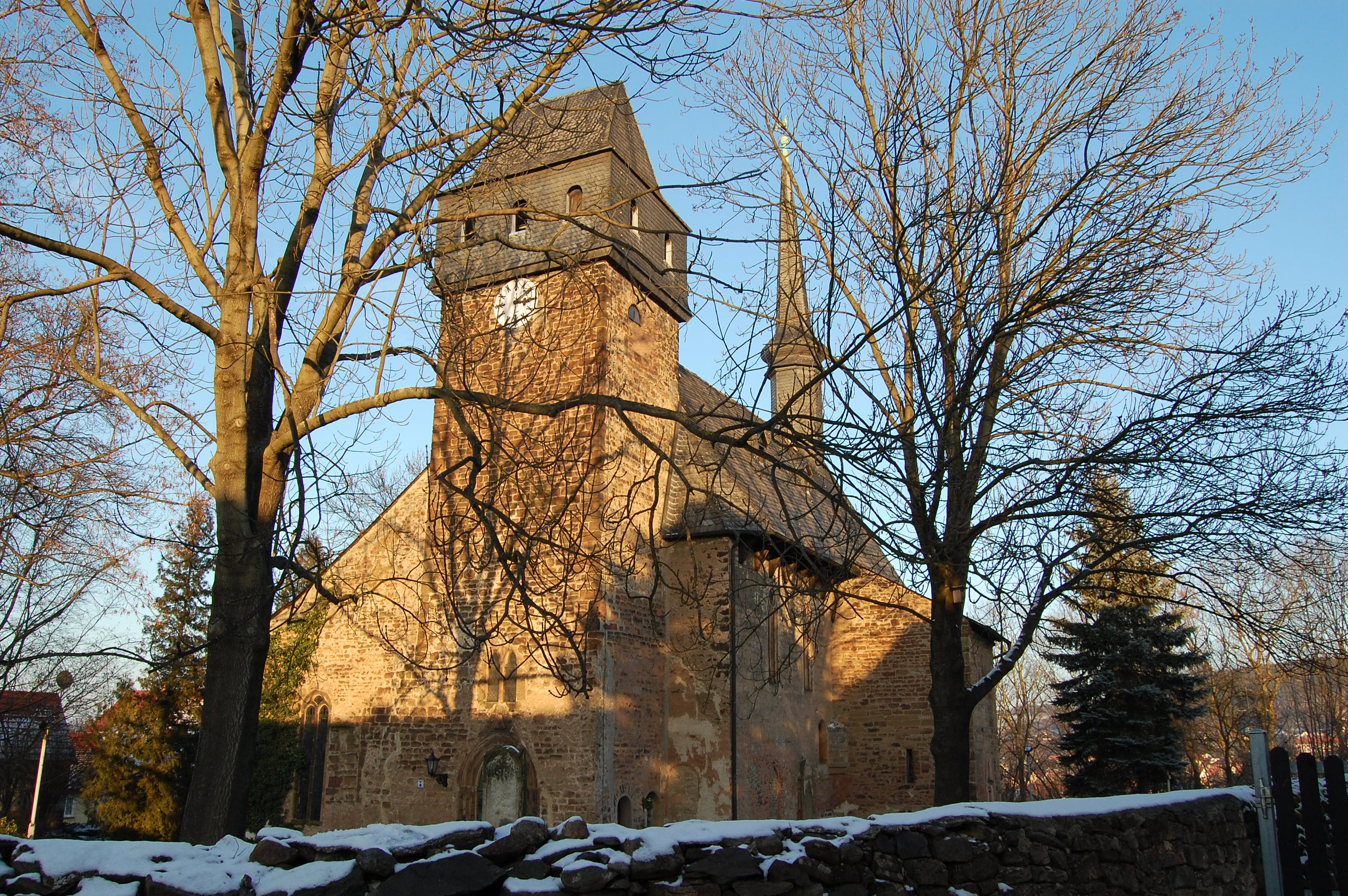
- Church of Saint Vitus

- Coat of arms
- Interactive map of Wünschendorf/Elster
- Location within Germany Location within Thuringia
- Coordinates: 50°47′44″N 12°5′51″E
- Country: Germany
- State: Thuringia
- District: Greiz
- Town: Berga-Wünschendorf

Area
  - Total: 19.5 km^{2} (7.5 sq mi)
- Elevation: 216 m (709 ft)

Population (2022-12-31)
  - Total: 2,773
  - Density: 142/km^{2} (368/sq mi)
- Time zone: UTC+01:00 (CET)
  - Summer (DST): UTC+02:00 (CEST)
- Postal codes: 07570
- Dialling codes: 036603
- Website: www.wuenschendorf.de

Wünschendorf/Elster (German pronunciation: [ˈvʏnʃn̩dɔʁf]) is a village and a former municipality in the district of Greiz, in Thuringia, Germany. On 1 January 2024 it became part of the town Berga-Wünschendorf.
