= Crimla =

- Municipality
- Coat of arms

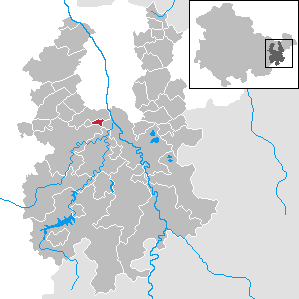
- Location of Crimla within Greiz district
- Interactive map of Crimla
- Location within Germany Location within Thuringia
- Coordinates: 50°48′10″N 12°2′40″E
- Country: Germany
- State: Thuringia
- District: Greiz

Government
  - Mayor (2021–27): Ronny Haupt

Area
  - Total: 1.44 km^{2} (0.56 sq mi)
- Elevation: 280 m (920 ft)

Population (2025-12-31)
  - Total: 268
  - Density: 186/km^{2} (482/sq mi)
- Time zone: UTC+01:00 (CET)
  - Summer (DST): UTC+02:00 (CEST)
- Postal codes: 07557
- Dialling codes: 03 66 03
- Vehicle registration: GRZ
- Website: www.crimla.de

Crimla is a municipality in the district of Greiz, in Thuringia, Germany.
