= Reichstädt =

- Municipality
- Coat of arms

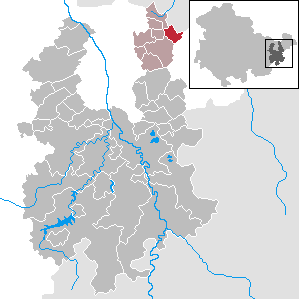
- Location of Reichstädt within Greiz district
- Interactive map of Reichstädt
- Location within Germany Location within Thuringia
- Coordinates: 50°55′30″N 12°14′6″E
- Country: Germany
- State: Thuringia
- District: Greiz
- Municipal assoc.: Am Brahmetal
- Subdivisions: 2

Government
  - Mayor (2019–25): Henryk Mäder

Area
  - Total: 5.03 km^{2} (1.94 sq mi)
- Elevation: 245–287 m (804–942 ft)

Population (2025-12-31)
  - Total: 318
  - Density: 63.2/km^{2} (164/sq mi)
- Time zone: UTC+01:00 (CET)
  - Summer (DST): UTC+02:00 (CEST)
- Postal codes: 07580
- Dialling codes: 036602
- Vehicle registration: GRZ
- Website: www.vg-brahmetal.de

Reichstädt is a municipality in the district of Greiz, in Thuringia, Germany. The town is member of the municipal association Am Brahmetal.
