= Von Dohlen =

Von Dohlen is a surname. Notable people with the surname include:

- Lenny Von Dohlen (1958–2022), American actor
- Tim Von Dohlen, American politician
