= Saxe-Altenburg =

German duchy

Duchy of Saxe-Altenburg (1602–1918) Herzogtum Sachsen-Altenburg
- 1602–1672; 1826–1918
- Top: Flag of Saxe-Altenburg (1893-1918); Bottom: Flag of Saxe-Altenburg (1826-1893) Coat of arms

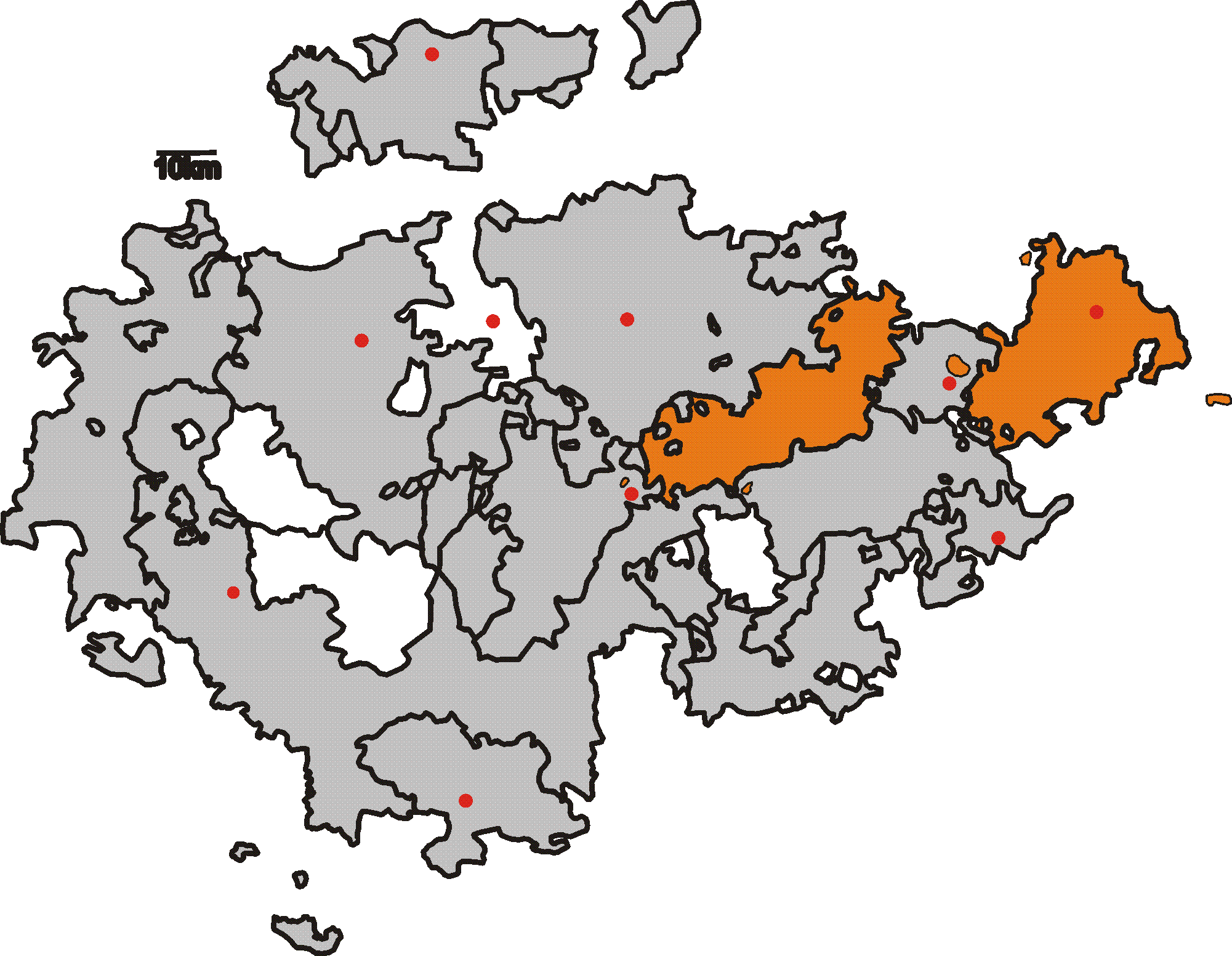
- Saxe-Altenburg within the German Empire The Ernestine duchies after 1825, with Saxe-Altenburg in orange
- Status: State of the Holy Roman Empire, State of the German Confederation, State of the North German Confederation, State of the German Empire
- Capital: Altenburg
- Common languages: German
- Religion: Roman Catholicism
- Government: Duchy (1602–1918)
- Duke
  - 1603–1613: Johann Philipp (first)
  - 1908–1918: Ernst II (last)
- History
  - Saxe-Weimar partitioned: 7 July 1602
  - Personal union with Saxe-Gotha*: 1672–1825
  - Ernestine duchies rearranged, duchy restored: 1826
  - German Revolution: November 1918
  - Merged into Thuringia‡: 1918
Preceded by	Succeeded by
Saxe-Weimar; Saxe-Gotha-Altenburg	Free State of Saxe-Altenburg; Saxe-Gotha-Altenburg
- Today part of: Germany
- * See Saxe-Gotha-Altenburg † As Free State of Saxe-Altenburg ‡ In 1920, Saxe-Altenburg, Saxe-Meiningen, Saxe-Gotha, Saxe-Weimar-Eisenach, Schwarzburg-Sondershausen, Schwarzburg-Rudolstadt and the combined Reuss states merged to form the State of Thuringia.

Saxe-Altenburg (German: Sachsen-Altenburg) was one of the Saxon duchies held by the Ernestine branch of the House of Wettin in present-day Thuringia. It was one of the smallest of the German states with an area of 1323 square kilometers and a population of 207,000 (1905) of whom about one fifth resided in the capital, Altenburg. The territory of the duchy consisted of two non-contiguous territories separated by land belonging to the Principality of Reuss-Gera. Its economy was based on agriculture, forestry, and small industry. The state had a constitutional monarchical form of government with a parliament composed of thirty members chosen by male taxpayers over 25 years of age.

== Territory ==
Saxe-Altenburg had an area of 1,323 km^{2} (510 sq. mi.) and a population of 207,000 in 1905. Its capital was Altenburg.

The duchy consisted of two separate areas: the Ostkreis, containing the cities of Altenburg, Schmölln, Gößnitz, Lucka und Meuselwitz (including the exclave of Mumsdorf), Roschütz, Hilbersdorf, Neukirchen by Waldenburg and Rußdorf by Chemnitz; and the Westkreis, which contained the cities of Eisenberg, Kahla, Orlamünde und Roda (including the exclave of Ammelstädt). The Ostkreis roughly corresponds to the modern Altenburger Land district of Thuringia, plus the area around Ronneburg in Greiz. The Westkreis is now mostly in Saale-Holzland district, with small portions in neighbouring districts. The duchy contained the Pleiße and Saale rivers.

== History ==
The duchy had its origins in the medieval Burgraviate of Altenburg in the Imperial Pleissnerland (Terra Plisensis), a possession of the Wettin Margraves of Meissen since 1243. Following the partition of Leipzig in 1485, Altenburg fell to Ernst, Elector of Saxony, the progenitor of the Ernestine Wettins. After the Capitulation of Wittenberg in 1547, the area around Altenburg went to the Albertine branch, but it was transferred back to the Ernestine Duchy of Saxony by the Treaty of Naumburg in 1554, and then to the Duchy of Saxe-Weimar following the Partition of Erfurt in 1572.

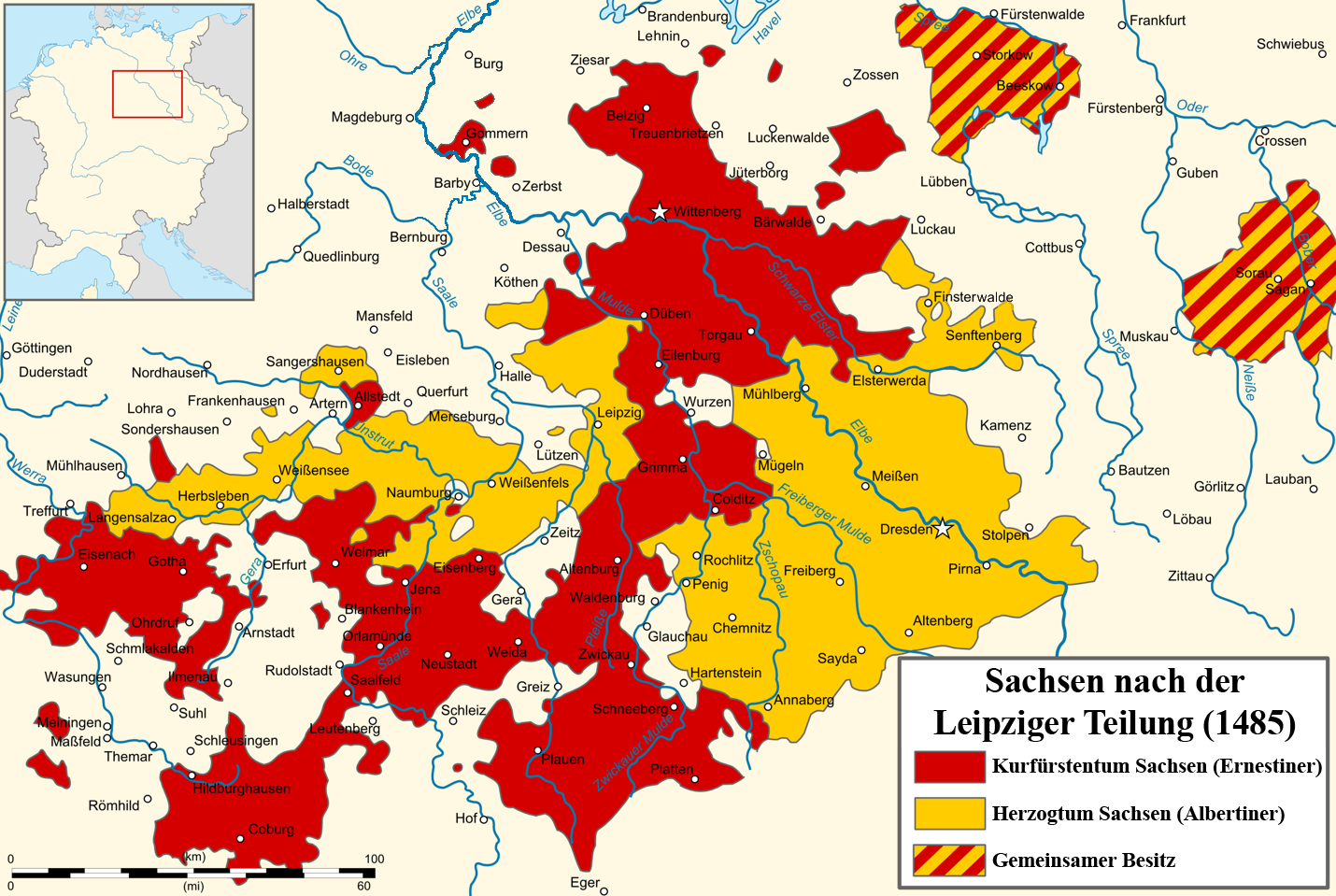
Altenburg within Ernestine domains (red) upon the Treaty of Leipzig (1485)

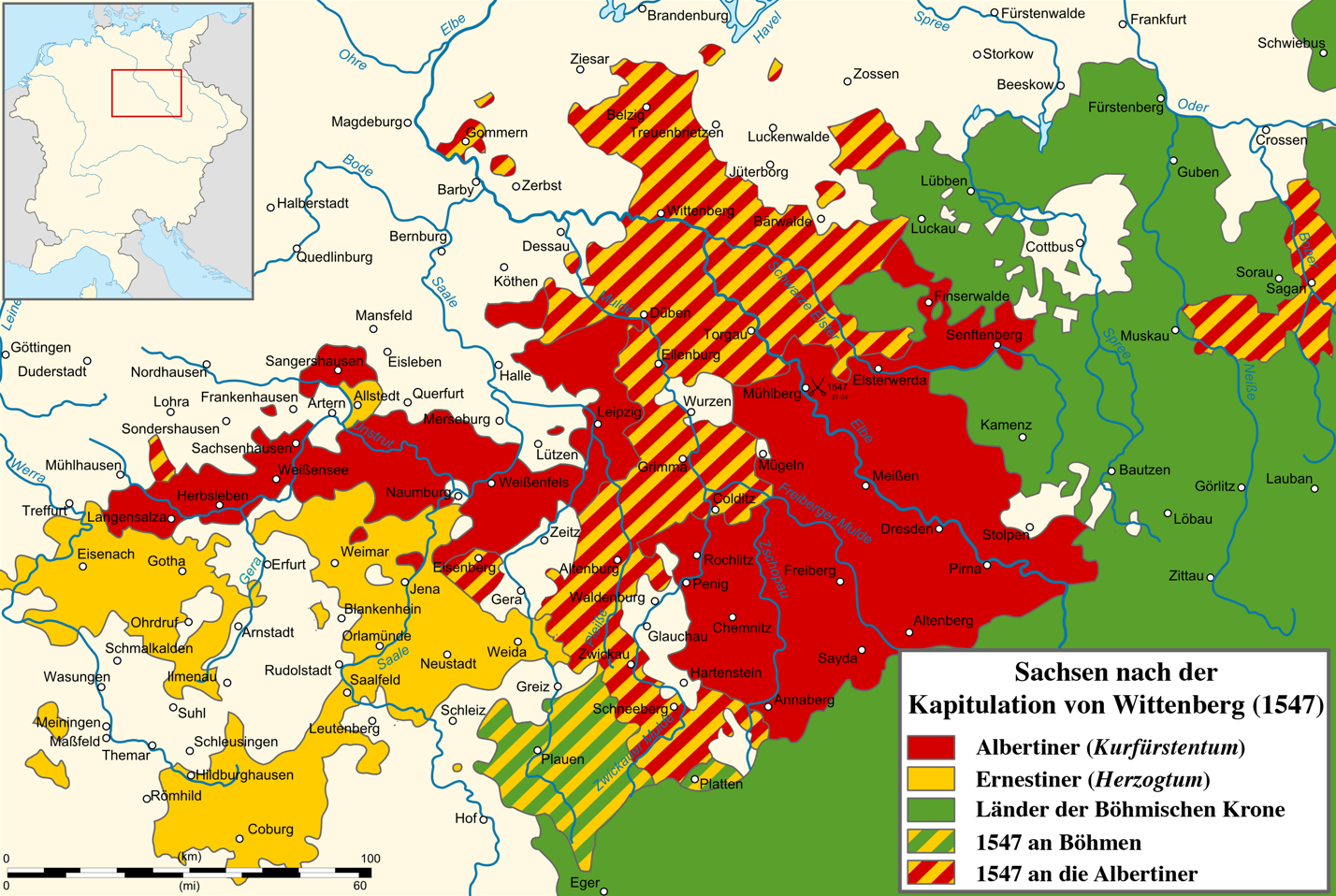
Transfer of Altenburg to Albertine domains (striped) upon the Capitulation of Wittenberg (1547)

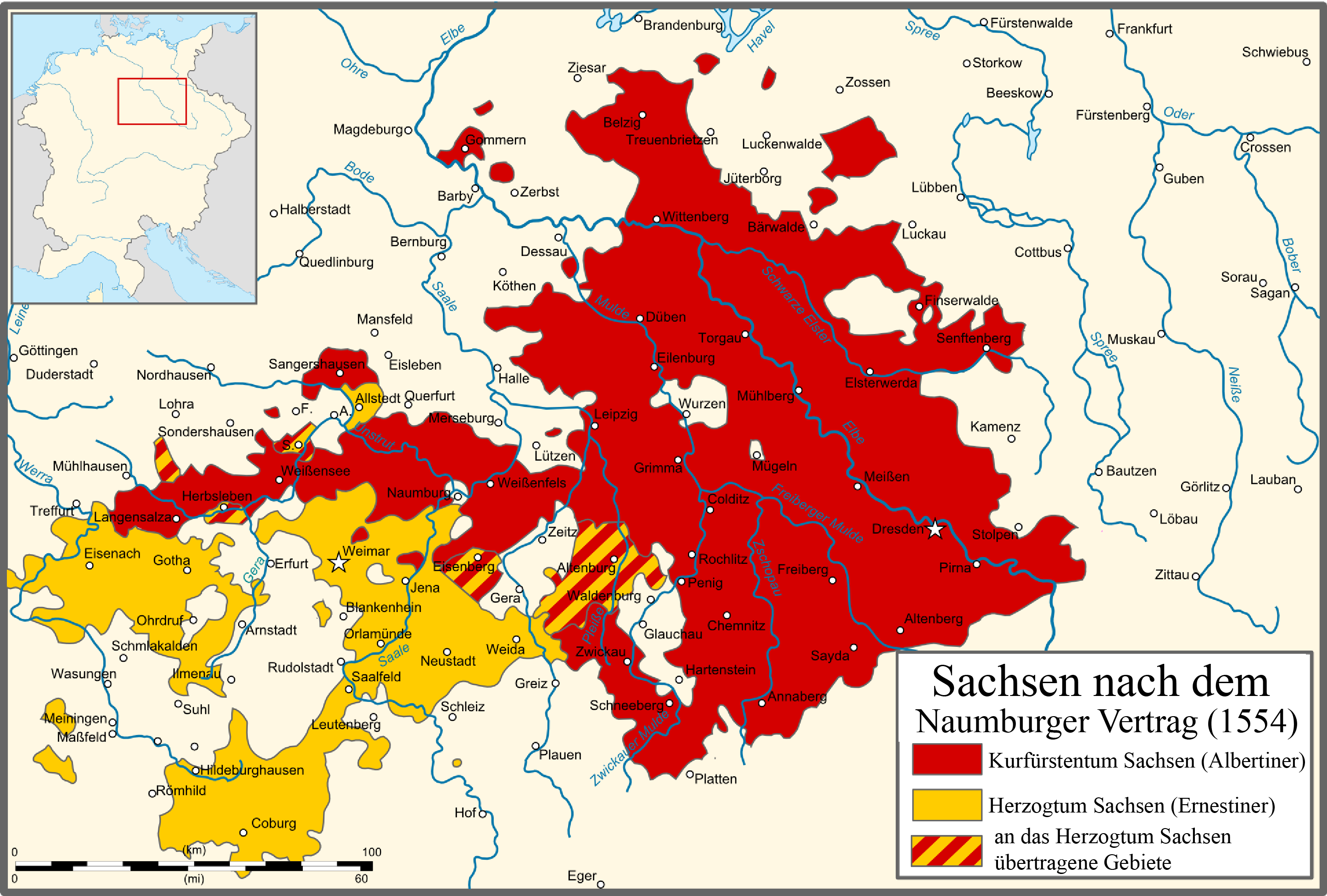
Transfer of Altenburg back to Ernestine domains (striped) upon the Treaty of Naumburg (1554)

When Johann Wilhelm's son and successor Friedrich Wilhelm I died in 1602, the Duchy of Saxe-Weimar passed to his younger brother Johann II. In 1603 Frederick William's eldest son Johann Philipp received the newly created Duchy of Saxe-Altenburg as compensation. It was an Imperial State in its own right, with a vote in the Reichstag, for much of the 17th century until the extinction of its ruling line in 1672 when it was inherited by Ernest I the Pious, the Duke of Saxe-Gotha, who had married the heiress.

Saxe-Altenburg thereafter remained part of Saxe-Gotha-Altenburg until the extinction of that house in 1825, when Gotha and Altenburg were divided up, with Gotha going to the Duke of Saxe-Coburg-Saalfeld and Altenburg to the Duke of Saxe-Hildburghausen, who in exchange gave up Hildburghausen to the Duke of Saxe-Meiningen. This family ruled the duchy until the end of the monarchies in the course of the German Revolution of 1918–19. The succeeding Free State of Saxe-Altenburg became part of the new State of Thuringia when it formed in 1920.

== Dukes of Saxe-Altenburg ==
=== Elder line ===
- Johann Philipp, Duke of Saxe-Altenburg (1603–1639)
- Friedrich Wilhelm II, Duke of Saxe-Altenburg (1639–1669)
- Friedrich Wilhelm III, Duke of Saxe-Altenburg (1669–1672)

Line extinct, inherited by Saxe-Gotha, thereupon Saxe-Gotha-Altenburg

=== Junior line ===
- Frederick, Duke of Saxe-Altenburg (1826–1834) (Previously Duke of Saxe-Hildburghausen)
- Joseph, Duke of Saxe-Altenburg (1834–1848)
- Georg, Duke of Saxe-Altenburg (1848–1853)
- Ernst I, Duke of Saxe-Altenburg (1853–1908)
- Ernst II, Duke of Saxe-Altenburg (1908–1918)

== Gallery ==
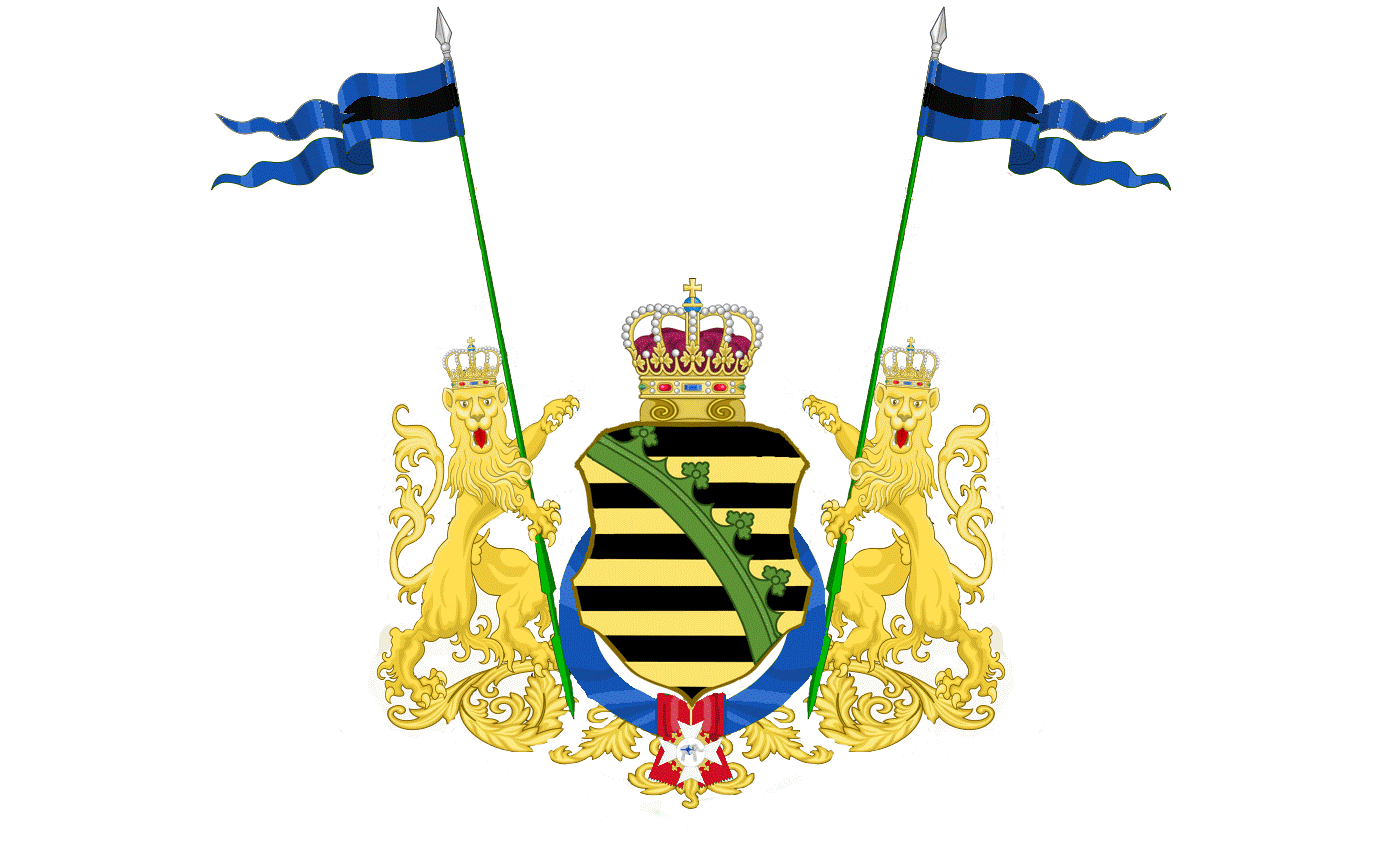
Ducal Standard 1826-1909

Ducal Standard 1909-1918

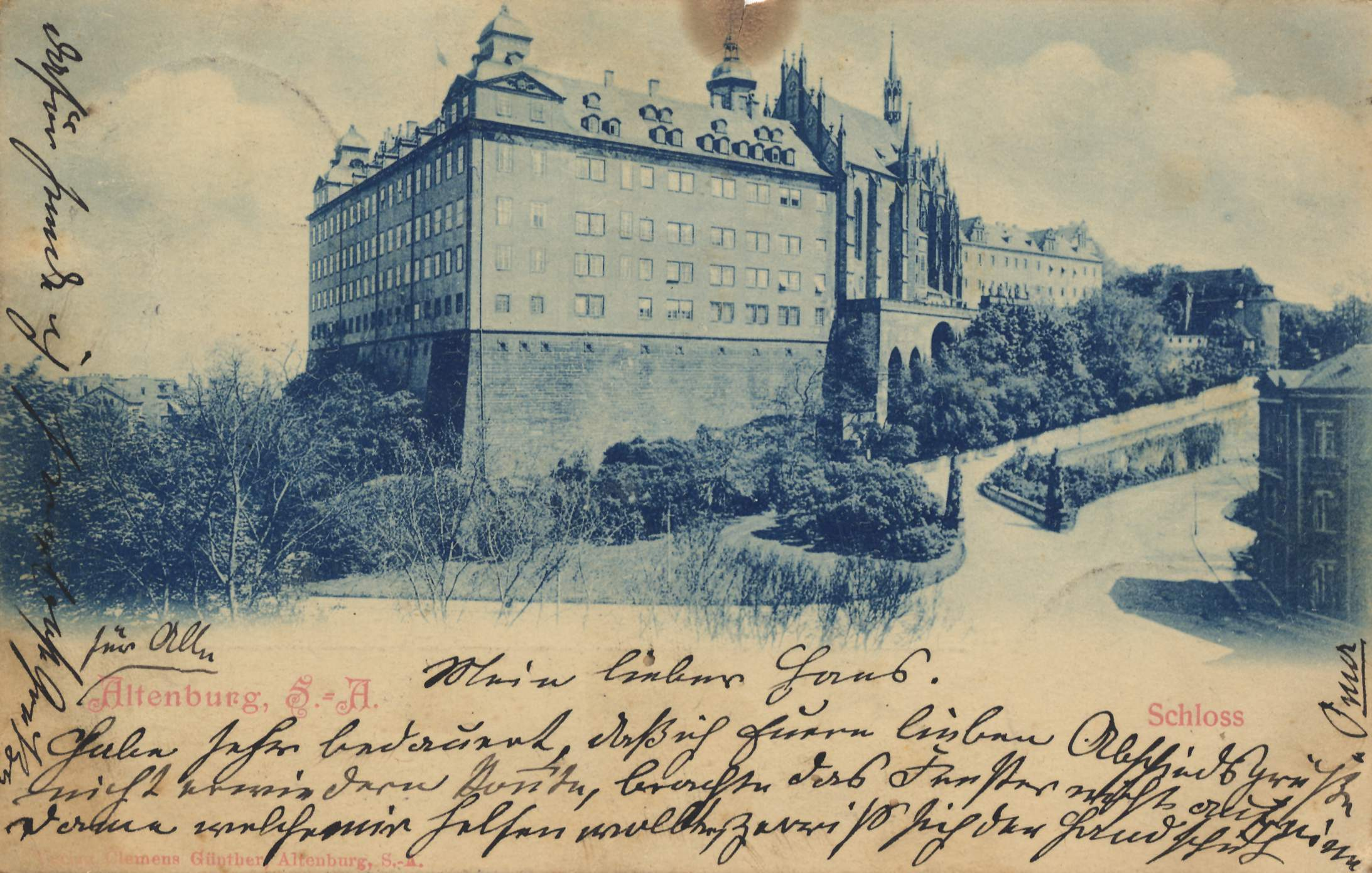
Castle of Altenburg

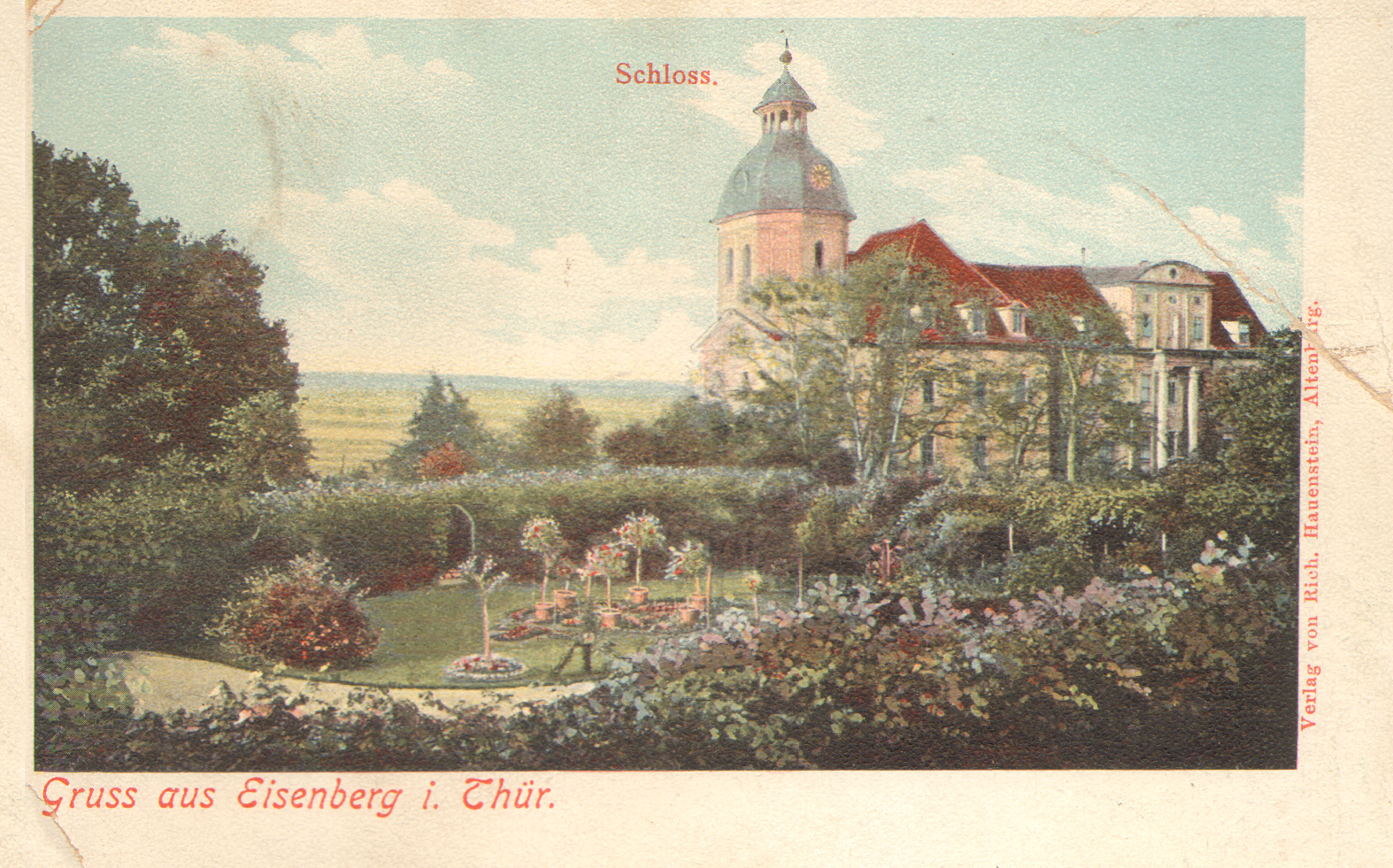
Christiansburg Castle at Eisenberg

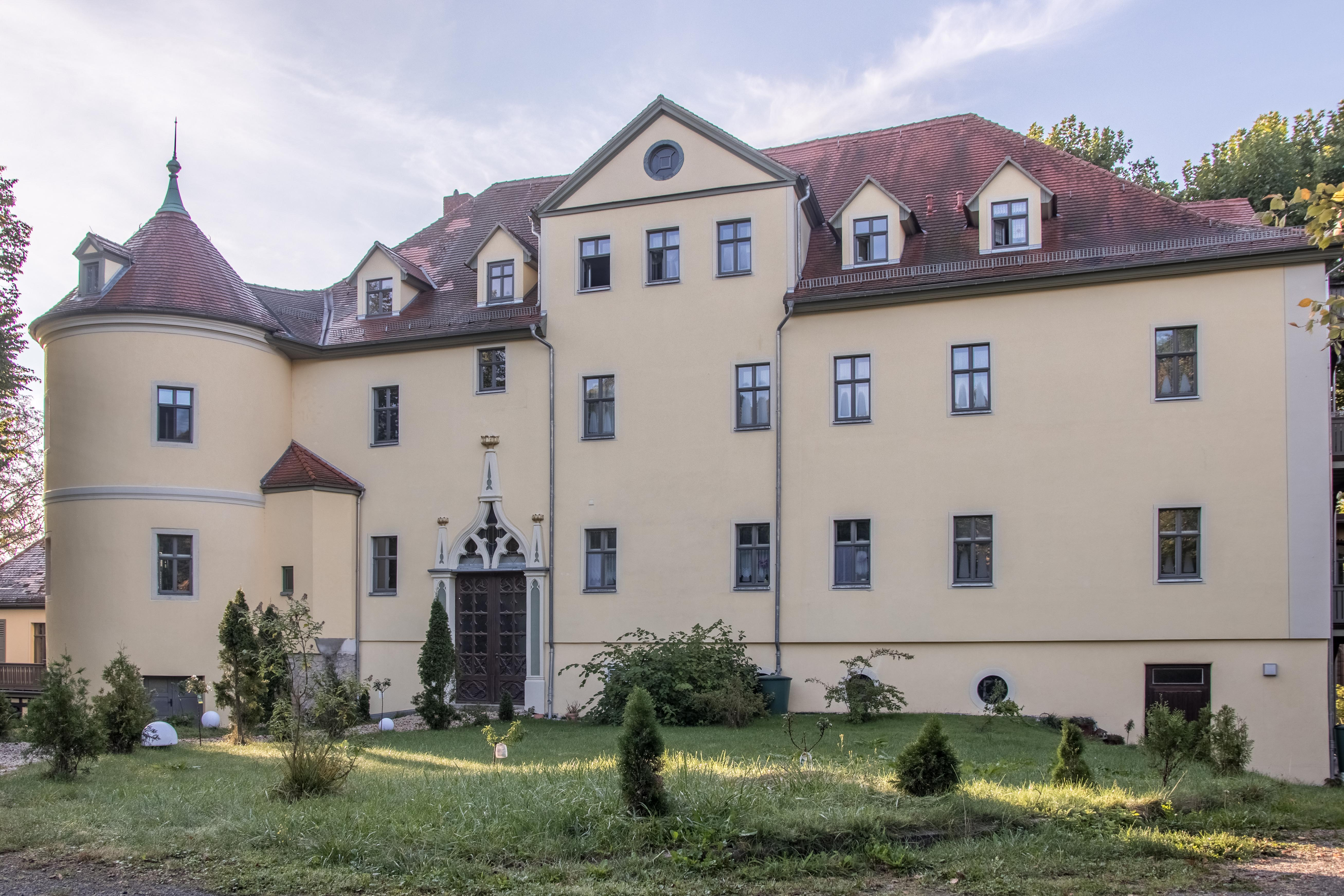
The Old Hunting Lodge at Hummelshain

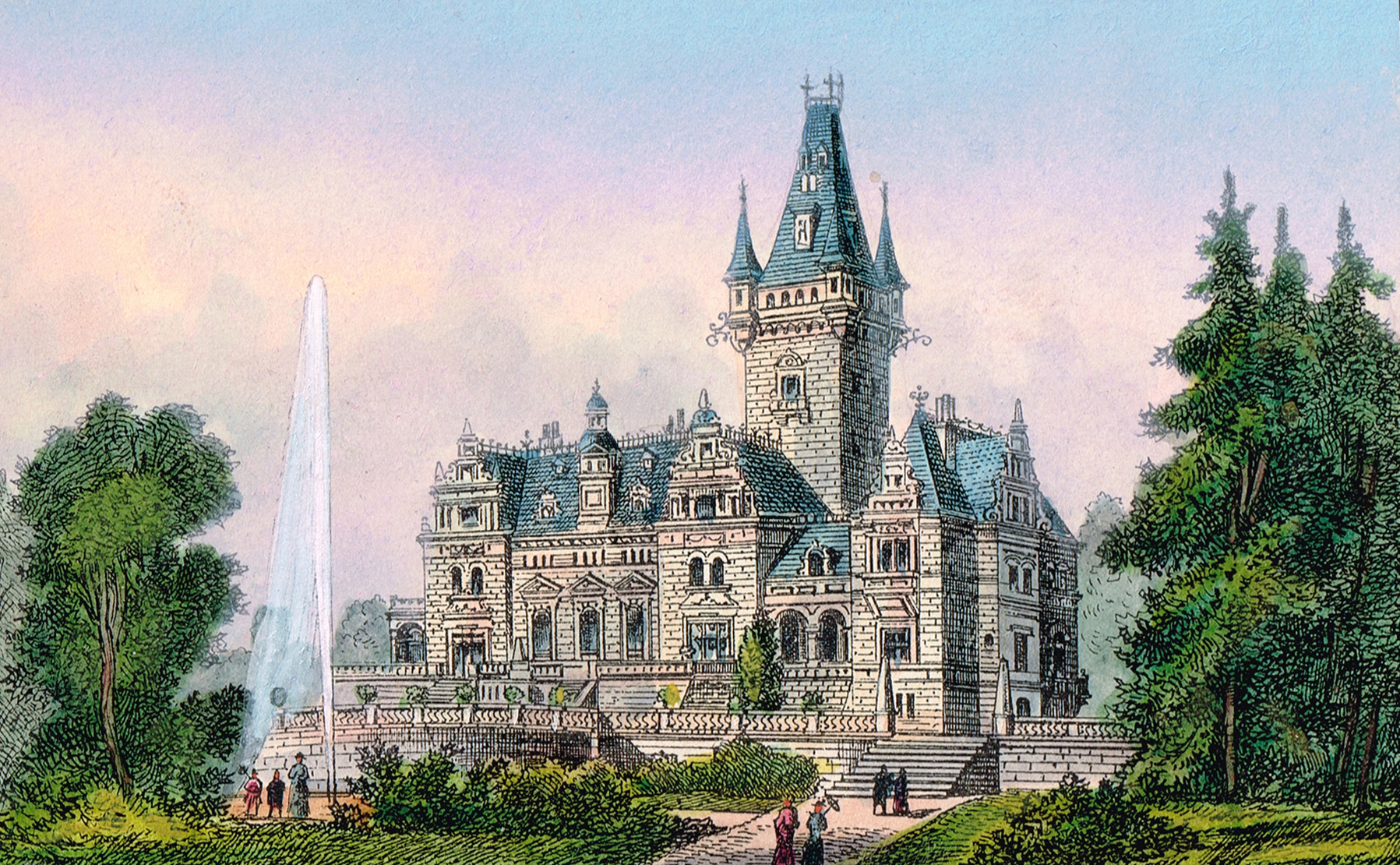
The New Hunting Lodge at Hummelshain

== See also ==
- Ernestine duchies
- History of Thuringia

== Sources ==
- Blaschke, Karlheinz (2002). "Die Leipziger Teilung der wettinischen Länder von 1485". Beiträge zur Verfassungs- und Verwaltungsgeschichte Sachsens: Ausgewählte Aufsätze von Karlheinz Blaschke. Leipzig: Leipziger Universitätsverlag. pp. 323–335.
- Groß, Reiner (2007). Die Wettiner. Stuttgart: Kohlhammer Verlag.
- Tebruck, Stefan (2005). "Zwischen Integration und Selbstbehauptung: Thüringen im wettinischen Herrschaftsbereich". Fragen der politischen Integration im mittelalterlichen Europa. Ostfildern: Jan Thorbecke Verlag. pp. 375–412, 589–591.
- Wilson, Peter H. (2016). Heart of Europe: A History of the Holy Roman Empire. Cambridge: Harvard University Press.
