= Berga Kulle Nature Reserve =

Nature reserve in Södermanland, Sweden

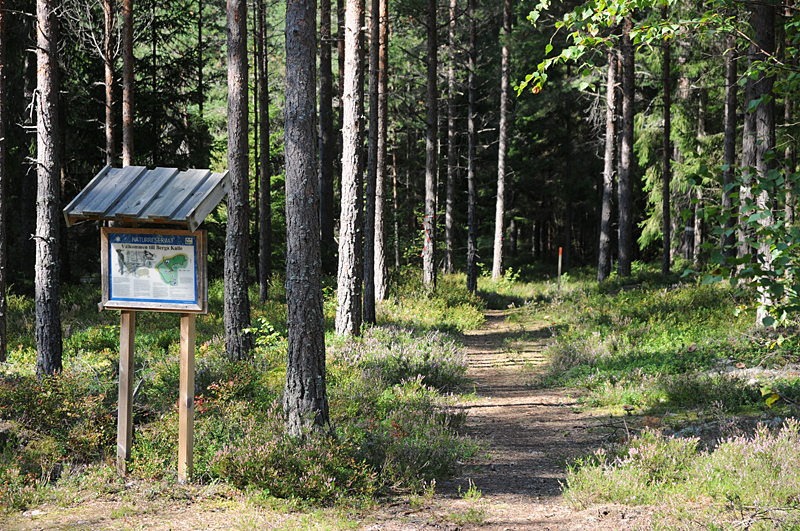

- Location within Södermanland
- Location: Sweden
- Nearest city: Nyköping
- Coordinates: 58°43′49″N 16°48′34″E
- Area: 32.2 ha (80 acres)
- Established: 2003

Berga Kulle Nature Reserve (Swedish: Berga Kulle naturreservat) is a nature reserve in Södermanland County in Sweden. It is part of the EU-wide Natura 2000-network.

The nature reserve consists of a rocky plateau or hill and its surroundings. Large patches of bedrock dominate the hill, where Scots pine grow, often in the form of krummholz.(some specimen are as old as 250 to 300 years). In the south-western part of the nature reserve, moraine characterises the geology, and here the pine trees grow taller and stronger. Towards the north, spruce instead dominate the forest. The whole area also has plenty of coarse woody debris, which is beneficial for the area's biodiversity. The forest is rich in mosses and lichens, and the protection of the moss Buxbaumia viridis is one of the explicit aims of the nature reserve.
