= Merkendorf, Styria =

Merkendorf
- Former municipality
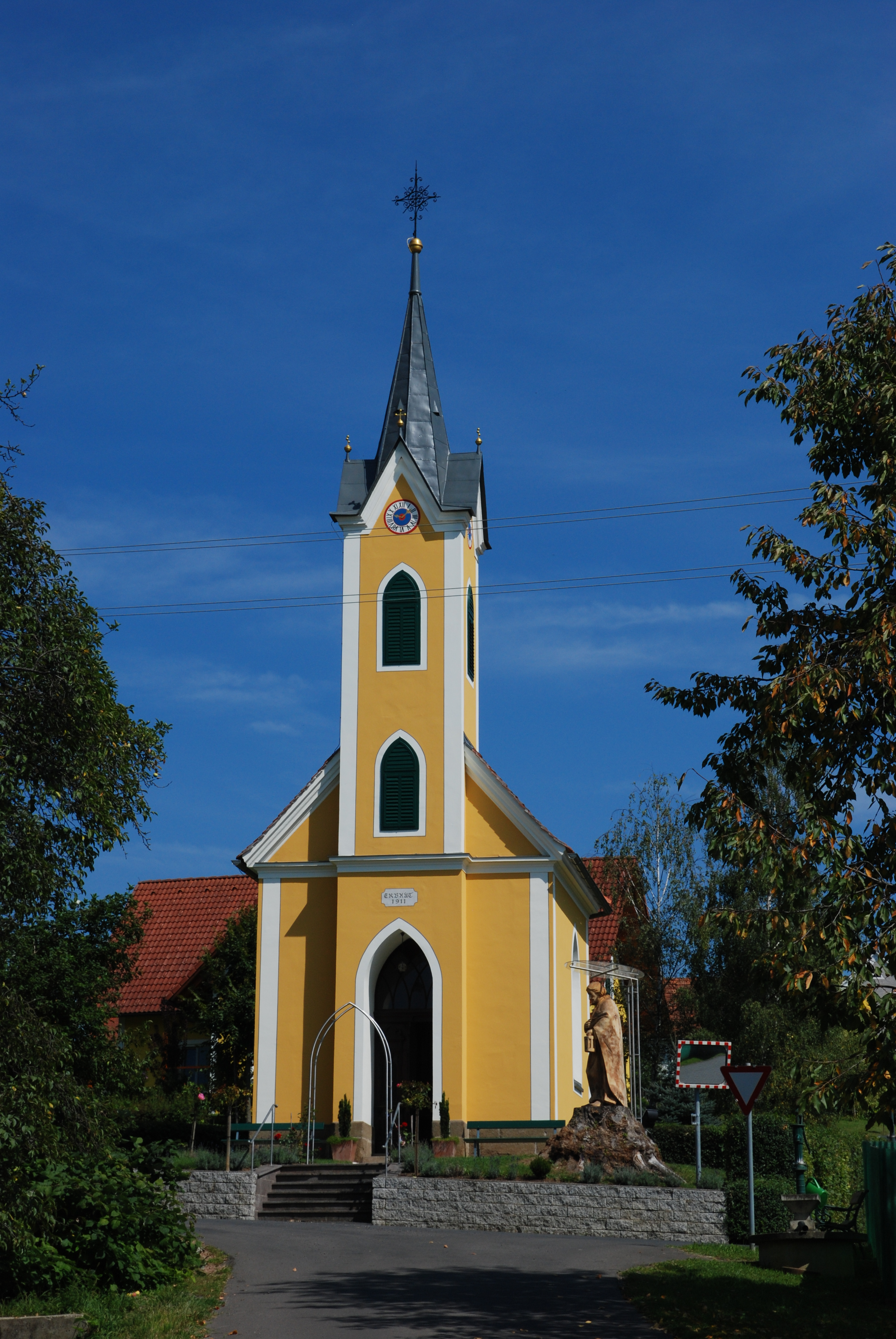
- Chapel in Merkendorf

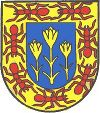
- Coat of arms

- Location within Austria
- Coordinates: 46°51′00″N 15°54′00″E
- Country: Austria
- State: Styria
- District: Südoststeiermark

Area
  - Total: 11.21 km^{2} (4.33 sq mi)
- Elevation: 273 m (896 ft)

Population (1 January 2016)
  - Total: 1,151
  - Density: 102.7/km^{2} (265.9/sq mi)
- Time zone: UTC+1 (CET)
  - Summer (DST): UTC+2 (CEST)
- Postal code: 8344
- Area code: +43 3159
- Vehicle registration: FB
- Website: www.merkendorf.at

Merkendorf (Austrian German: [ˈmɛrkn̩ˌdɔrf]) is a former municipality in the district of Südoststeiermark in the Austrian state of Styria. Since the 2015 Styria municipal structural reform, it is part of the municipality Bad Gleichenberg.

== Population ==
Historical population
Year	Pop.	±%
1869	1,195	—
1880	1,172	−1.9%
1890	1,276	+8.9%
1900	1,284	+0.6%
1910	1,190	−7.3%
1923	1,064	−10.6%
1934	1,102	+3.6%
1939	1,069	−3.0%
1951	1,046	−2.2%
1961	1,106	+5.7%
1971	1,153	+4.2%
1981	1,113	−3.5%
1991	1,080	−3.0%
2001	1,163	+7.7%
2013	1,160	−0.3%
