= Merkendorf, Thuringia =

Merkendorf
- Stadtteil of Zeulenroda-Triebes
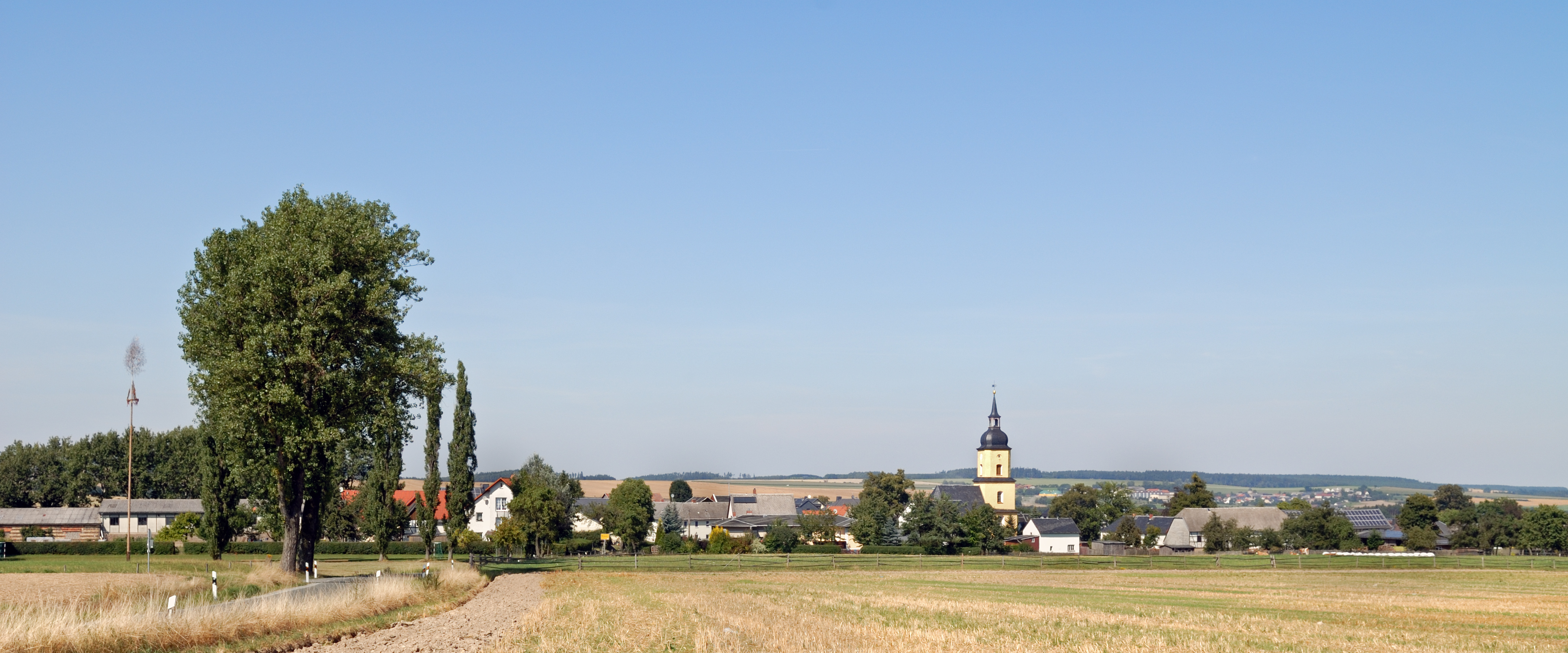

- Coat of arms
- Interactive map of Merkendorf
- Location within Germany Location within Thuringia
- Coordinates: 50°41′24″N 11°58′22″E
- Country: Germany
- State: Thuringia
- District: Greiz
- Town: Zeulenroda-Triebes

Area
  - Total: 9.53 km^{2} (3.68 sq mi)
- Elevation: 375 m (1,230 ft)

Population (2010-12-31)
  - Total: 290
  - Density: 30/km^{2} (79/sq mi)
- Time zone: UTC+01:00 (CET)
  - Summer (DST): UTC+02:00 (CEST)
- Postal codes: 07950
- Dialling codes: 036626

Merkendorf (German: [ˈmɛʁkn̩ˌdɔʁf]) is a village and a former municipality in the district of Greiz, in Thuringia, Germany. Since 1 December 2011, it is part of the town Zeulenroda-Triebes.
