= Teichwitz =

- Municipality
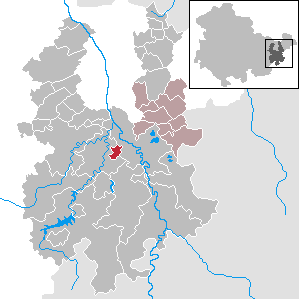
- Location of Teichwitz within Greiz district
- Interactive map of Teichwitz
- Location within Germany Location within Thuringia
- Coordinates: 50°45′28″N 12°5′5″E
- Country: Germany
- State: Thuringia
- District: Greiz
- Municipal assoc.: Ländereck

Government
  - Mayor (2022–28): Steffen Wolff

Area
  - Total: 3.06 km^{2} (1.18 sq mi)
- Elevation: 331 m (1,086 ft)

Population (2025-12-31)
  - Total: 97
  - Density: 32/km^{2} (82/sq mi)
- Time zone: UTC+01:00 (CET)
  - Summer (DST): UTC+02:00 (CEST)
- Postal codes: 07570
- Dialling codes: 03 66 03
- Vehicle registration: GRZ
- Website: www.teichwitz.de

Teichwitz is a municipality in the district of Greiz, in Thuringia, Germany. It is part of the municipal association of Ländereck.
