= Auma =

Town in Thuringia, Germany

- Stadtteil of Auma-Weidatal
- Coat of arms
- Interactive map of Auma
- Location within Germany Location within Thuringia
- Coordinates: 50°42′N 11°54′E
- Country: Germany
- State: Thuringia
- District: Greiz
- Town: Auma-Weidatal

Area
  - Total: 30.98 km^{2} (11.96 sq mi)
- Elevation: 394 m (1,293 ft)

Population (2010-12-31)
  - Total: 3,033
  - Density: 97.90/km^{2} (253.6/sq mi)
- Time zone: UTC+01:00 (CET)
  - Summer (DST): UTC+02:00 (CEST)
- Postal codes: 07955
- Dialling codes: 036626
- Vehicle registration: GRZ
- Website: www.auma-stadt.de

Auma (German pronunciation: [ˈaʊma]) is a town and a former municipality in the district of Greiz, in Thuringia, Germany. Since 1 December 2011, it is part of the municipality Auma-Weidatal. It is situated 24 km southwest of Gera.

== History ==
Within the German Empire (1871-1918), Auma was part of the Grand Duchy of Saxe-Weimar-Eisenach.
