= Seelingstädt =

- Municipality
- Coat of arms

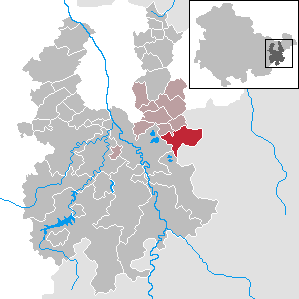
- Location of Seelingstädt within Greiz district
- Interactive map of Seelingstädt
- Location within Germany Location within Thuringia
- Coordinates: 50°47′28″N 12°14′33″E
- Country: Germany
- State: Thuringia
- District: Greiz
- Municipal assoc.: Ländereck
- Subdivisions: 5

Government
  - Mayor (2022–28): Regina Hilbert

Area
  - Total: 17.97 km^{2} (6.94 sq mi)
- Elevation: 295–345 m (968–1,132 ft)

Population (2025-12-31)
  - Total: 1,147
  - Density: 63.83/km^{2} (165.3/sq mi)
- Time zone: UTC+01:00 (CET)
  - Summer (DST): UTC+02:00 (CEST)
- Postal codes: 07580
- Dialling codes: 036608
- Vehicle registration: GRZ

Seelingstädt is a municipality in the district of Greiz, in Thuringia, Germany. It is the seat of the municipal association of Ländereck.
