= Korbußen =

- Municipality
- Coat of arms

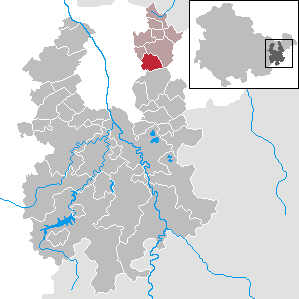
- Location of Korbußen within Greiz district
- Interactive map of Korbußen
- Location within Germany Location within Thuringia
- Coordinates: 50°53′29″N 12°10′16″E
- Country: Germany
- State: Thuringia
- District: Greiz
- Municipal assoc.: Am Brahmetal

Government
  - Mayor (2021–27): Manfred Lamprecht

Area
  - Total: 7.22 km^{2} (2.79 sq mi)
- Elevation: 291 m (955 ft)

Population (2025-12-31)
  - Total: 411
  - Density: 56.9/km^{2} (147/sq mi)
- Time zone: UTC+01:00 (CET)
  - Summer (DST): UTC+02:00 (CEST)
- Postal codes: 07554
- Dialling codes: 036602
- Vehicle registration: GRZ
- Website: www.vg-brahmetal.de

Korbußen is a municipality in the district of Greiz, in Thuringia, Germany. The town is member of the municipal association Am Brahmetal.
