= Gauern =

- Municipality
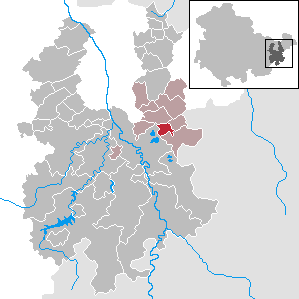
- Location of Gauern within Greiz district
- Interactive map of Gauern
- Location within Germany Location within Thuringia
- Coordinates: 50°47′N 12°12′E
- Country: Germany
- State: Thuringia
- District: Greiz
- Municipal assoc.: Ländereck

Government
  - Mayor (2022–28): Stefan Mattis

Area
  - Total: 3.67 km^{2} (1.42 sq mi)
- Elevation: 303 m (994 ft)

Population (2025-12-31)
  - Total: 121
  - Density: 33.0/km^{2} (85.4/sq mi)
- Time zone: UTC+01:00 (CET)
  - Summer (DST): UTC+02:00 (CEST)
- Postal codes: 07580
- Dialling codes: 036608
- Vehicle registration: GRZ

Gauern (German pronunciation: [ˈɡaʊɐn]) is a municipality in the district of Greiz, in Thuringia, Germany. It is part of the municipal association of Ländereck. Gauern has a population of 121 people (Dec. 2022).
