= Braunichswalde =

- Municipality
- Coat of arms

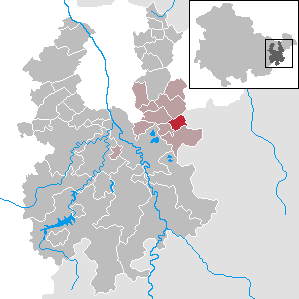
- Location of Braunichswalde within Greiz district
- Interactive map of Braunichswalde
- Location within Germany Location within Thuringia
- Coordinates: 50°48′N 12°13′E
- Country: Germany
- State: Thuringia
- District: Greiz
- Municipal assoc.: Ländereck

Government
  - Mayor (2022–28): Philipp Moser (CDU)

Area
  - Total: 5.18 km^{2} (2.00 sq mi)
- Elevation: 325 m (1,066 ft)

Population (2025-12-31)
  - Total: 611
  - Density: 118/km^{2} (305/sq mi)
- Time zone: UTC+01:00 (CET)
  - Summer (DST): UTC+02:00 (CEST)
- Postal codes: 07580
- Dialling codes: 036608
- Vehicle registration: GRZ

Braunichswalde is a municipality in the district of Greiz, in Thuringia, Germany. It is part of the municipal association of Ländereck.
