= Berga, Thuringia =

Berga
- Stadtteil of Berga-Wünschendorf
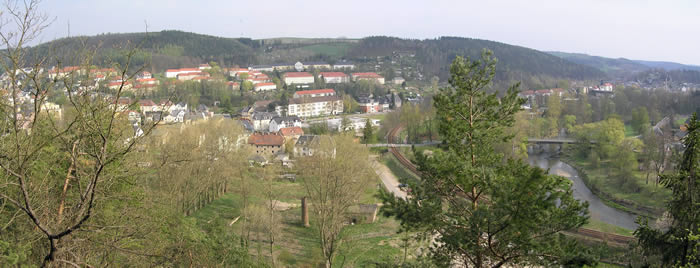

- Coat of arms
- Interactive map of Berga
- Location within Germany Location within Thuringia
- Coordinates: 50°45′N 12°10′E
- Country: Germany
- State: Thuringia
- District: Greiz
- Town: Berga-Wünschendorf

Area
  - Total: 43.52 km^{2} (16.80 sq mi)
- Elevation: 229 m (751 ft)

Population (2022-12-31)
  - Total: 3,218
  - Density: 73.94/km^{2} (191.5/sq mi)
- Time zone: UTC+01:00 (CET)
  - Summer (DST): UTC+02:00 (CEST)
- Postal codes: 07980
- Dialling codes: 036623
- Website: Stadt-Berga.de

Berga/Elster (German pronunciation: [ˈbɛʁɡa]) is a former town in the district of Greiz, in Thuringia, Germany. On 1 January 2024 it became part of the town Berga-Wünschendorf. It is situated on the White Elster river, 14 km southeast of Gera.

== History ==
Within the German Empire (1871–1918), Berga/Elster was part of the Grand Duchy of Saxe-Weimar-Eisenach.

== Berga concentration camp ==
During World War II, a slave labor camp called "Berga an der Elster" was operated here to dig 17 tunnels for an underground ammunition factory. Workers were supplied by Buchenwald concentration camp and from a POW camp, Stalag IX-B; the latter contravened the provisions of the Third Geneva Convention and the Hague Treaties. Many prisoners died as a result of malnutrition, sickness (including pulmonary disease due to dust inhalation from tunnelling with explosives), and beatings, including 73 American POWs.

== Personalities ==
- Hans Bastian I. von Zehmen (1598–1638), Saxon colonel of the Leibregiment, commander of Magdeburg
- Gerhard Schot (1866–1961), geographer and oceanographer, born in the district of Tschirma

== See also ==
- List of subcamps of Buchenwald
- Project Riese
- Soldiers and Slaves (2005)
