= Greiz (district) =

Coordinates: 50°45′N 12°05′E

- District
- Flag Coat of arms
- Country: Germany
- State: Thuringia
- Capital: Greiz

Government
  - District admin.: Ulli Schäfer (CDU)

Area
  - Total: 845.97 km^{2} (326.63 sq mi)

Population (31 December 2022)
  - Total: 96,381
  - Density: 110/km^{2} (300/sq mi)
- Time zone: UTC+01:00 (CET)
  - Summer (DST): UTC+02:00 (CEST)
- Vehicle registration: GRZ, ZR
- Website: www.landkreis-greiz.de

Greiz (/ɡraɪts/ gryts) is a Kreis (district) in the east of Thuringia, Germany. Neighboring districts are (from the west clockwise) Saale-Holzland, Saale-Orla, district-free city Gera, the Burgenlandkreis in Saxony-Anhalt, Altenburger Land, and the two Saxon districts Zwickau and Vogtlandkreis.

== History ==
Historically the area of the district was part of the Vogtland, named after the title Vogt given to the local rulers in the 13th century. Only two lines of the Reuß family survived from that time, with one principality based in Greiz, and the other in Gera and Schleiz. In 1919 both were merged into the Volksstaat Reuß, which then became part of Thuringia in 1920.

A subcamp of the Buchenwald concentration camp was located at Berga/Elster during World War II. It was an SS joint venture, in which inmates dug tunnels and laid railway tracks for the Schwalbe V project.

The district in its current form was created on 1 July 1994, when the districts Gera-Land, Zeulenroda and the previous district Greiz were merged.

== Geography ==
In the south of the district are the mountains of the Thuringian Slate Mountains (Thüringer Schiefergebirge) and the Ore Mountains, with the river valley of the Weiße Elster going through the district from south to north.

== Coat of arms ==
Both the lion as well as the crane in the top part of the coat of arms derive from the coat of arms of the Reuß families and their principalities. In the bottom is a part of the coat of arms of Saxony, as a small part of the district belonged to the Duchies of Saxony.

== Towns and municipalities ==
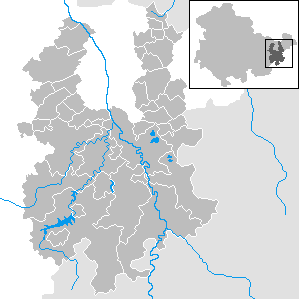
Clickable map of towns and municipalities in the district

Verwaltungsgemeinschaft-free towns
1. Auma-Weidatal
2. Bad Köstritz
3. Berga-Wünschendorf
4. Greiz
5. Hohenleuben
6. Ronneburg
7. Weida
8. Zeulenroda-Triebes
and municipalities
1. Caaschwitz
2. Crimla
3. Harth-Pöllnitz
4. Kraftsdorf
5. Langenwetzendorf
6. Langenwolschendorf
7. Mohlsdorf-Teichwolframsdorf
8. Weißendorf

Verwaltungsgemeinschaften
| 1. Am Brahmetal; 1. Bethenhausen; 2. Brahmenau; 3. Großenstein^{1}; 4. Hirschfeld; 5. Korbußen; 6. Pölzig; 7. Reichstädt; 8. Schwaara | 2. Ländereck; 1. Braunichswalde; 2. Endschütz; 3. Gauern; 4. Hilbersdorf; 5. Kauern; 6. Linda bei Weida; 7. Paitzdorf; 8. Rückersdorf; 9. Seelingstädt^{1}; 10. Teichwitz | 3. Münchenbernsdorf; 1. Bocka; 2. Hundhaupten; 3. Lederhose; 4. Lindenkreuz; 5. Münchenbernsdorf^{1, 2}; 6. Saara; 7. Schwarzbach; 8. Zedlitz |
^{1}seat of the Verwaltungsgemeinschaft;^{2}town

== Sights ==
Sights in the district Greiz:

- The Upper Castle of Greiz
- The Lower Castle of Greiz
- The Summer Palace Greiz
- Weida Osterburg Castle
- Ronneburg Castle
- Reichenfels Castle Ruin
- Old Guardhouse "Alte Wache" in Greiz
- Zeulenroda Town Hall
- Widen Church Ruin in Weida
- St. Veit Parish Church
- Mildenfurth Monastery
- Cronschwitz Monastery Ruin
- Greiz Park
- Fairy Tale Forest in Wünschendorf

Museums in the district Greiz:

- Museum of Local History in Greiz
- Summer Palace in Greiz
- Zeulenroda City Museum in Zeulenroda
- Osterburg Castle Museum in Weida, Thuringia
- Heinrich Schütz House in Bad Köstritz
- Museum in Hohenleuben
