= Altenburger Land (Verwaltungsgemeinschaft) =

Coordinates: 50.967°N 12.317°E

Altenburger Land is a former Verwaltungsgemeinschaft ("collective municipality") in the district Altenburger Land, in Thuringia, Germany. The seat of the Verwaltungsgemeinschaft was in Mehna. It was disbanded in January 2019.

The Verwaltungsgemeinschaft Altenburger Land consisted of the following municipalities:

- Altkirchen
- Dobitschen
- Drogen
- Göhren
- Göllnitz
- Lumpzig
- Mehna
- Starkenberg
