= Sprotte =

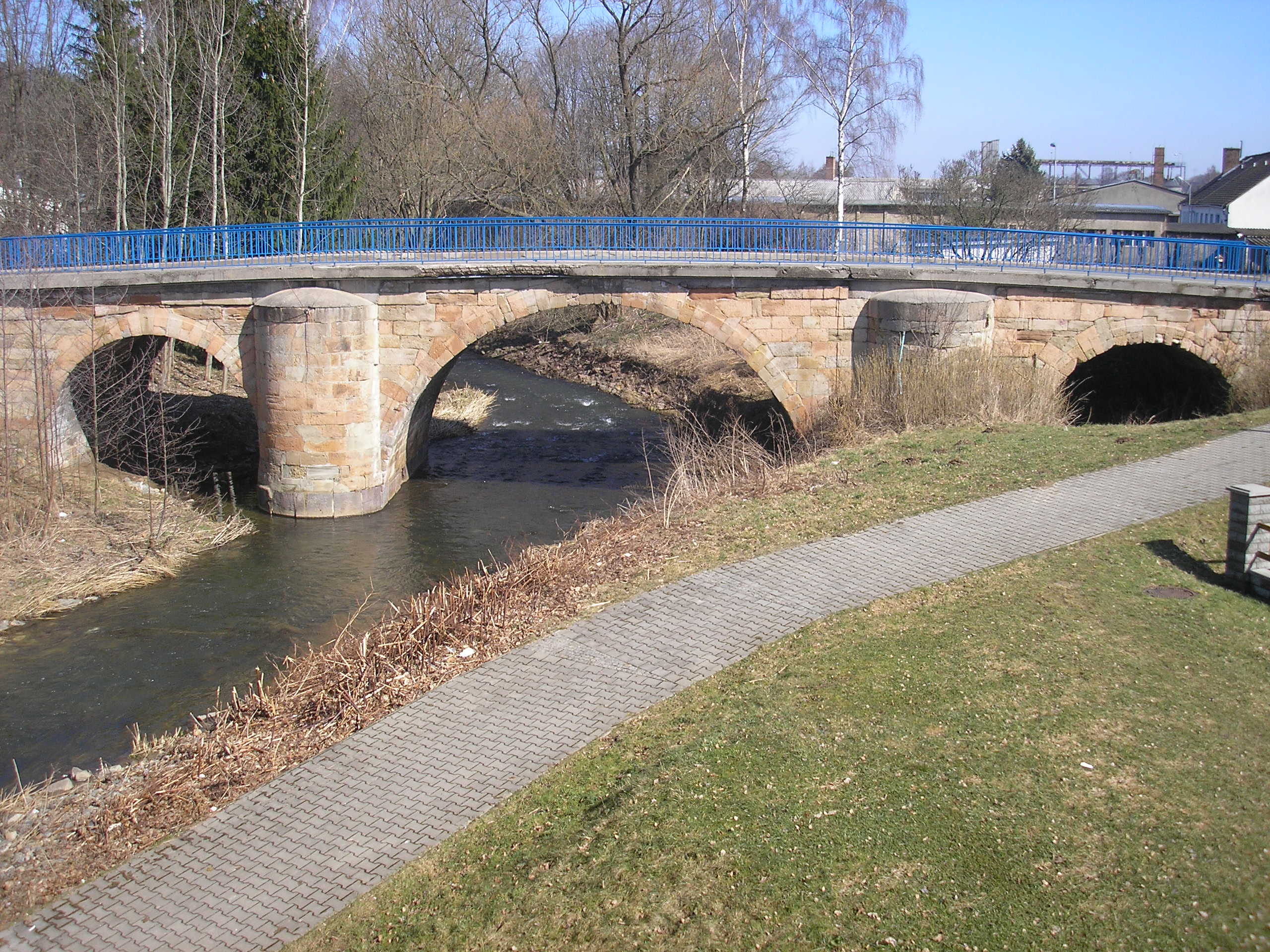
- The Old Bridge over the Sprotte in Schmölln

Location
- Country: Germany
- State: Thuringia
- Reference no.: DE: 56664

Physical characteristics
- Source
  - location: In four headstreams west of Crimmitschau, e.g. near Gera (parish in Leumnitz) as the Großensteiner Sprotte
  - coordinates: 50°52′55″N 12°08′44″E
  - elevation: about 309 m (Großensteiner Sprotte)
- Mouth
  - location: Near Saara into the Pleiße
  - coordinates: 50°56′17″N 12°25′15″E
  - elevation: about 187 m
- Length: 30 km
- Basin size: 165.7 km^{2}
- Discharge
  - location: at Großstöbnitz gauge
  - average: 620 L/s
  - minimum: Record low: 68 L/s (in 1991); Average low: 233 L/s
  - maximum: Average high: 7.43 m³/s Record high: 16.6 m³/s (in 30.11.2002)

Basin features
- Progression: Pleiße→ White Elster→ Saale→ Elbe→ North Sea
- Landmarks: Large towns: Schmölln

The Sprotte is a left tributary of the Pleiße in East Thuringia, Germany.

The headwaters of the river come from three source streams, which begin west of Crimmitschau and are as follows:

- The Western Sprotte, whose source is near Rückersdorf
- The Middle Heukewalder Sprotte, which begins near Nischwitz
- The Eastern Mannichswalder Sprotte

The western branch flows northwest and meets with the Heukewalder Sprotte near Vollmershain. Between Posterstein and Nöbdenitz these flow into the Eastern Sprotte. Then the Sprotte flows northeast through the municipality of Nöbdenitz, then further through the city of Schmölln to Saara, where it meets the Pleiße.

The river is 25 km long (Mannichswalder Sprotte). The Sprotte river valley partly follows the rail line from Gera to Altenburg as well as the Bundesstraße 7.

From its source to its mouth, the Sprotte travels 120 meters downhill (from 315 to 195 m above sea level).

== See also ==
- List of rivers of Thuringia

== Notes ==
- The information in this article is based on and/or translated from its German equivalent.
