= Schmölln =

- Town
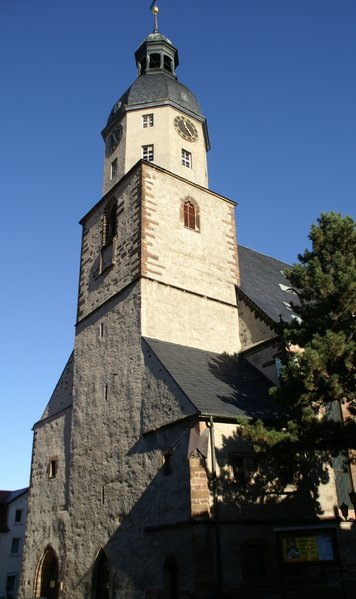

- Coat of arms

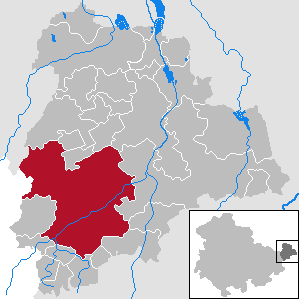
- Location of Schmölln within Altenburger Land district
- Interactive map of Schmölln
- Location within Germany Location within Thuringia
- Coordinates: 50°53′42″N 12°21′23″E
- Country: Germany
- State: Thuringia
- District: Altenburger Land
- Subdivisions: 14

Government
  - Mayor (2021–27): Sven Schrade (SPD)

Area
  - Total: 101.08 km^{2} (39.03 sq mi)
- Elevation: 220 m (720 ft)

Population (2025-12-31)
  - Total: 13,953
  - Density: 138.04/km^{2} (357.52/sq mi)
- Time zone: UTC+01:00 (CET)
  - Summer (DST): UTC+02:00 (CEST)
- Postal codes: 04626
- Dialling codes: 034491
- Vehicle registration: ABG, SLN
- Website: www.schmoelln.de

Schmölln (German pronunciation: [ʃmœln]) is a town in Thuringia, Germany, landkreis of Altenburger Land. It lies on the river Sprotte.

== Geography ==
=== Neighboring municipalities ===
Municipalities in the district of Altenburger Land neighboring Schmölln include: Starkenberg, Göllnitz, Göhren, Altenburg, Nobitz, the town of Gößnitz, Ponitz, Heyersdorf, Thonhausen, Vollmershain, Posterstein and Löbichau.

=== Subdivisions ===
Schmölln consists of the town Schmölln and 47 local subdivisions (Ortsteile):

- Altkirchen
- Bohra
- Brandrübel
- Braunshain
- Burkersdorf
- Dobitschen
- Dobra
- Drogen
- Gimmel
- Gödissa
- Göldschen
- Graicha
- Großbraunshain
- Großstöbnitz
- Großtauschwitz
- Hartha
- Hartroda
- Illsitz
- Jauern
- Kakau
- Kleinmückern
- Kleintauscha
- Kleintauschwitz
- Kratschütz
- Kummer
- Lohma
- Lumpzig
- Meucha
- Mohlis
- Nitzschka
- Nöbdenitz
- Nödenitzsch
- Papiermühle
- Platschütz
- Pontewitz
- Prehna
- Rolika
- Röthenitz
- Schloßig
- Selka
- Sommeritz
- Trebula
- Untschen
- Weißbach
- Wildenbörten
- Zagkwitz
- Zschernitzsch

== History ==
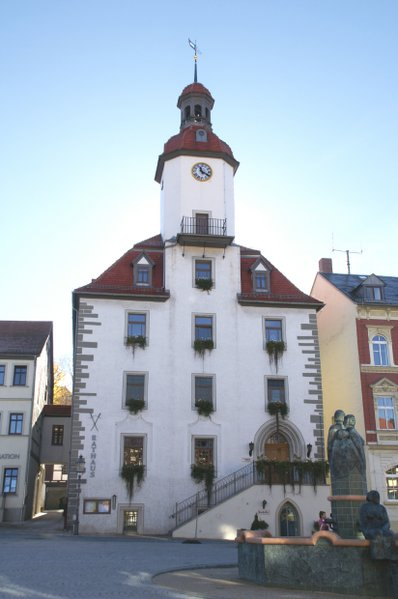
Schmölln city hall

Within the German Empire (1871–1918), Schmölln was part of the Duchy of Saxe-Altenburg. From 1952 to 1990, it was part of the Bezirk Leipzig of East Germany.

Important Dates:

1066 — Schmölln is first mentioned in writing as ABBATIA ZMULNA
1127 — Building of the cloister on the Pfefferberg
13th–16th centuries — Schmölln is a pilgrimage destination (Marienwallfahrtsort)
1525 — Destruction of the cloister on the Pfefferberg
2016 — An underage Somalian asylum seeker jumps to his death, allegedly encouraged by onlookers

=== Incorporation ===
On March 8, 1994, Weißbach was incorporated into Schmölln, and on January 1, 1996, Großstöbnitz followed. The former municipalities Altkirchen, Drogen, Lumpzig, Nöbdenitz and Wildenbörten were merged into Schmölln in January 2019. The former municipality Dobitschen was absorbed in January 2026.

== Business and transport ==
Schmölln is located at a connection of Bundesautobahn 4 (Connection 61 Schmölln) and has a train station on the Middle-Germany Link (Weimar–Glauchau).

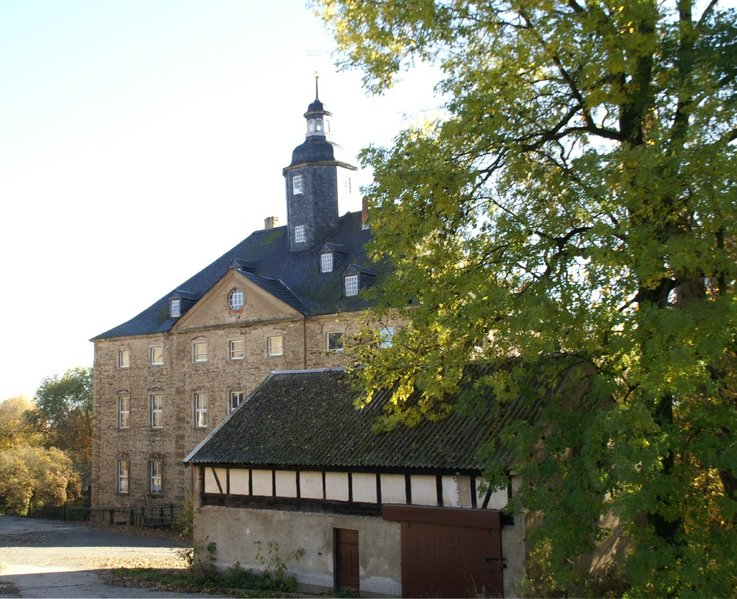
Dobitschen castle

== See also ==
- Grave Oak
