= Altkirchen =

- Ortsteil of Schmölln
- Coat of arms
- Interactive map of Altkirchen
- Location within Germany Location within Thuringia
- Coordinates: 50°56′31″N 12°21′2″E
- Country: Germany
- State: Thuringia
- District: Altenburger Land
- Town: Schmölln

Area
  - Total: 20.07 km^{2} (7.75 sq mi)
- Elevation: 228 m (748 ft)

Population (2017-12-31)
  - Total: 990
  - Density: 49/km^{2} (130/sq mi)
- Time zone: UTC+01:00 (CET)
  - Summer (DST): UTC+02:00 (CEST)
- Postal codes: 04626
- Dialling codes: 034491
- Vehicle registration: ABG

Altkirchen (German pronunciation: [altˈkɪʁçn̩]) is a village and a former municipality in the district Altenburger Land, in Thuringia, Germany. Since 1 January 2019, it is part of the town of Schmölln.

== Geography ==
=== Neighboring municipalities ===
Communities near Altkirchen are the city of Altenburg, Dobitschen, Drogen, Göhren, Göllnitz, Saara, and the city of Schmölln.

=== Municipal organization ===
The municipality of Altkirchen was divided into 13 districts:

- Altkirchen
- Gimmel
- Gödissa
- Göldschen
- Großtauschwitz
- Illsitz
- Jauern
- Kleintauschwitz
- Kratschütz
- Nöbden
- Platschütz
- Röthenitz
- Trebula

== History ==
Within the German Empire (1871–1918), Altkirchen was part of the Duchy of Saxe-Altenburg. From 1952 to 1990, it was part of the Bezirk Leipzig of East Germany.
