= Saara, Thuringia =

Saara is the name of two municipalities in Thuringia, Germany:

- Saara, Greiz
- Saara, Altenburger Land

== See also ==
- Saara (disambiguation)
