= Wildenbörten =

- Ortsteil of Schmölln
- Interactive map of Wildenbörten
- Location within Germany Location within Thuringia
- Coordinates: 50°54′45″N 12°17′11″E
- Country: Germany
- State: Thuringia
- District: Altenburger Land
- Town: Schmölln

Area
  - Total: 7.82 km^{2} (3.02 sq mi)
- Elevation: 240–295 m (787–968 ft)

Population (2017-12-31)
  - Total: 258
  - Density: 33.0/km^{2} (85.4/sq mi)
- Time zone: UTC+01:00 (CET)
  - Summer (DST): UTC+02:00 (CEST)
- Postal codes: 04626
- Dialling codes: 034491
- Vehicle registration: ABG
- Website: www.wildenboerten.de

Wildenbörten (German pronunciation: [ˈvɪldn̩bœʁtn̩]) is a village and a former municipality in the district Altenburger Land, in Thuringia, Germany. Since 1 January 2019, it is part of the town Schmölln.

== Geography ==
=== Neighboring municipalities ===
Municipalities near Wildenbörten are Drogen, Löbichau, Lumpzig, Mehna, and Nöbdenitz in the district of Altenburger Land; as well as Großenstein and Reichstädt in the district of Greiz.

=== Municipal organization ===
The municipality of Wildenbörten consisted of five subdivisions: Wildenbörten, Dobra, Graicha, Hartroda, and Kakau.

== History ==
Within the German Empire (1871–1918), Wildenbörten was part of the Duchy of Saxe-Altenburg.
