= Saara =

Saara may refer to:

== Places ==
- Saara, Estonia, a village in Lääne-Viru County, Estonia
- Saara, Greiz, a municipality in Thuringia, Germany
- Saara, Altenburger Land, a municipality in Thuringia, Germany

== Other ==
- Saara (lizard), a genus of lizard in the Uromastycinae subfamily
- Saara (name), a female given name
- Sara Forsberg, Finnish singer better known as SAARA
- Sociedade de Amigos das Adjacências da Rua da Alfândega (Saara), Rio de Janeiro, Brazil, a shopping district
