= Grave Oak =

Old oak tree containing a gravesite in Thuringia, Germany

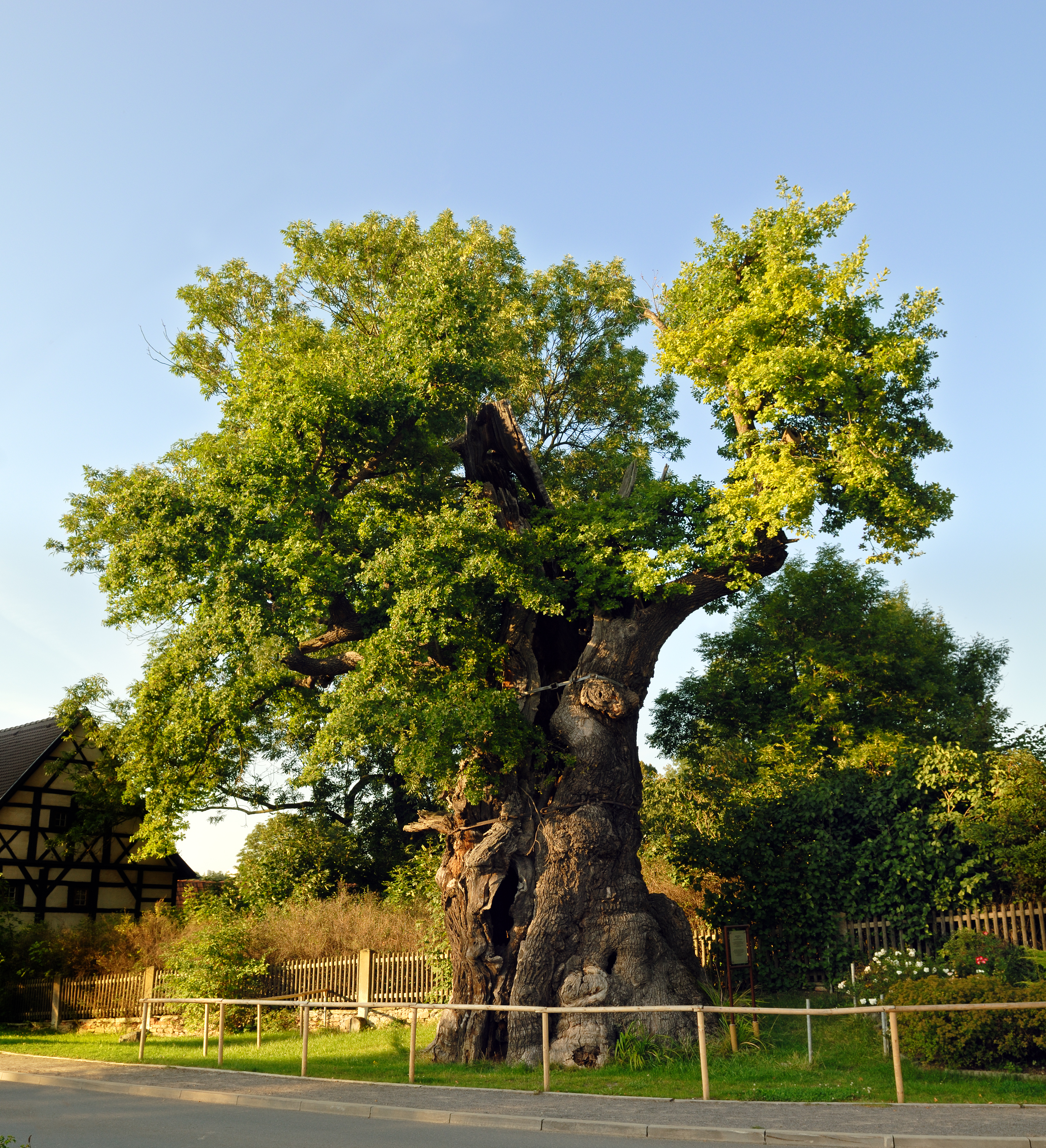
- Grave oak in September 2009

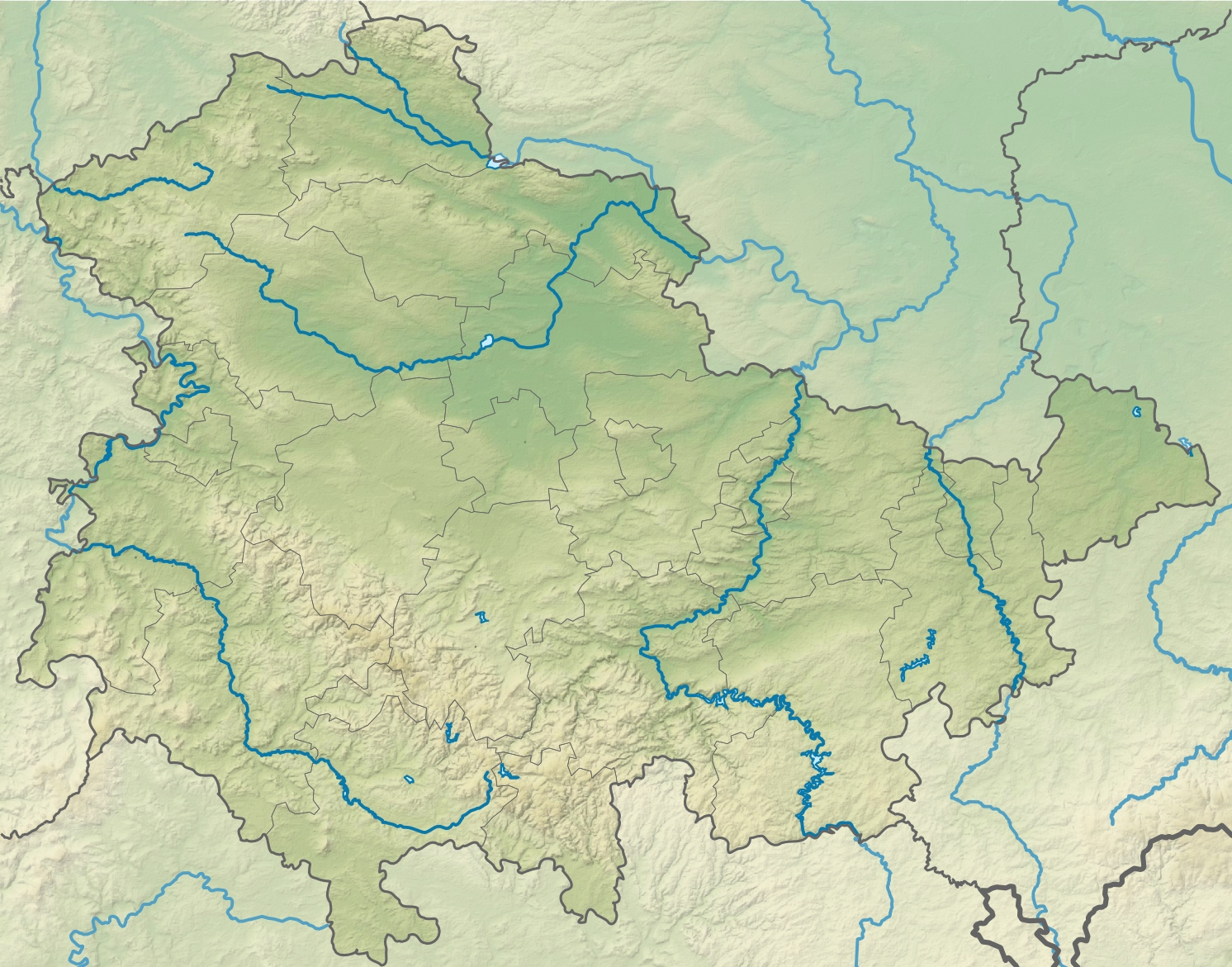
- Location within Thuringia Location within Germany
- Native name: Grabeiche (German)
- Species: Quercus robur
- Location: Nöbdenitz, Thuringia
- Coordinates: 50°52′25.3″N 12°16′53.8″E
- Height: 14 m (46 ft)

The Grave Oak (in German: Grabeiche, also known as the burial oak, Thümmel oak or "thousand-year-old oak") is a striking old specimen of the pedunculate oak (Quercus robur) in Nöbdenitz in Thuringia. There is a grave site in the tree's hollow trunk.

According to the Guinness Book of Records, it is the oldest pedunculate oak in Europe. However, the age of around 2000 years stated in the Guinness Book is contested. According to the latest literature, the oak is estimated to be between 700 and 800 years old. The oak is located in the centre of Nöbdenitz, about six kilometres southwest of Schmölln, in the Thuringian district of Altenburger Land. In its root zone, directly below the hollow trunk, there is a brick-built crypt containing the body of the manor owner Hans Wilhelm von Thümmel, who died in 1824. He was a writer, chronicler and cartographer of the Duchy of Altenburg and had acquired this unusual burial place from the parish before his death.

== Description ==
The grave oak stands at around 230 metres above standard zero in the centre of Nöbdenitz close to the church. Originally, a road passed directly to the southwest of the natural monument, which was relocated in the area of the tree in 2007. This created an open space around the base of the trunk, where a display board provides information about the oak.

The height of the oak is given as just under 14 metres. In 2002, the circumference of the trunk measured 12.7 metres above the ground. The trunk is completely hollow due to insect damage and the destructive work of the sulphur polypore (Laetiporus sulphureus). It is irregularly shaped and ends abruptly at the top in a sharp-edged fracture. The crown broke off in the early 19th century at a trunk height of about ten metres, a secondary crown below the break consists of two side branches with a width of 15 metres in a north-south direction and ten metres in a west-east direction. From the breaking point to just above the ground, the trunk is split vertically and is held together by three wide iron belts made of chain and band links. This is to prevent the trunk from finally breaking apart, which would mean the tree's death. It is not known when and by whom this safety device was installed.

An adventitious trunk, which formed several decades ago in the hollow trunk area on the south-west side and which is heavily barked in the lower area, is vital for the oak. This young trunk, which receives sufficient light and precipitation through the large opening in the secondary crown, provides the oak with sufficient nourishment. Nevertheless, it is not in good condition. The hollow trunk is already dead and rotten in many areas. The crown also shows a lot of damage. Some branches are poorly developed due to stunted growth. However, the stability of the oak is not yet in immediate danger.

There are various claims about the age of the oak. The Guinness Book of Records puts its age at 2000 years. This would make the burial oak not only the oldest oak in Germany, but in the whole of Europe. However, this is disputed. Hans Joachim Fröhlich gave an age of 1000 to 1200 years in 1994. However, this age is probably also too old, especially when the deterioration of the trunk caused by the sulphur mushroom and wood-decaying insects is taken into account.

Due to the hollow trunk, the annual rings cannot be counted. Due to the crown break in 1820, it is also not possible to determine the age using an old branch. The trunk of the oak has only grown slightly stronger over the past hundred years and a larger increase in circumference is not to be expected in the future, which is why the age cannot be determined based on the growth in thickness. There is also a lack of documented annual growth rates of the adventitious stem. In the latest literature, the age of the tree is given as 700 to 800 years. Even with this value, the grave oak is one of the oldest oaks in Germany. Other oaks that have at times been considered by experts to be the oldest in Germany include the Femeiche, the Gerichtseiche near the Gahrenberg and the Ivenacker Eichen.

== History ==
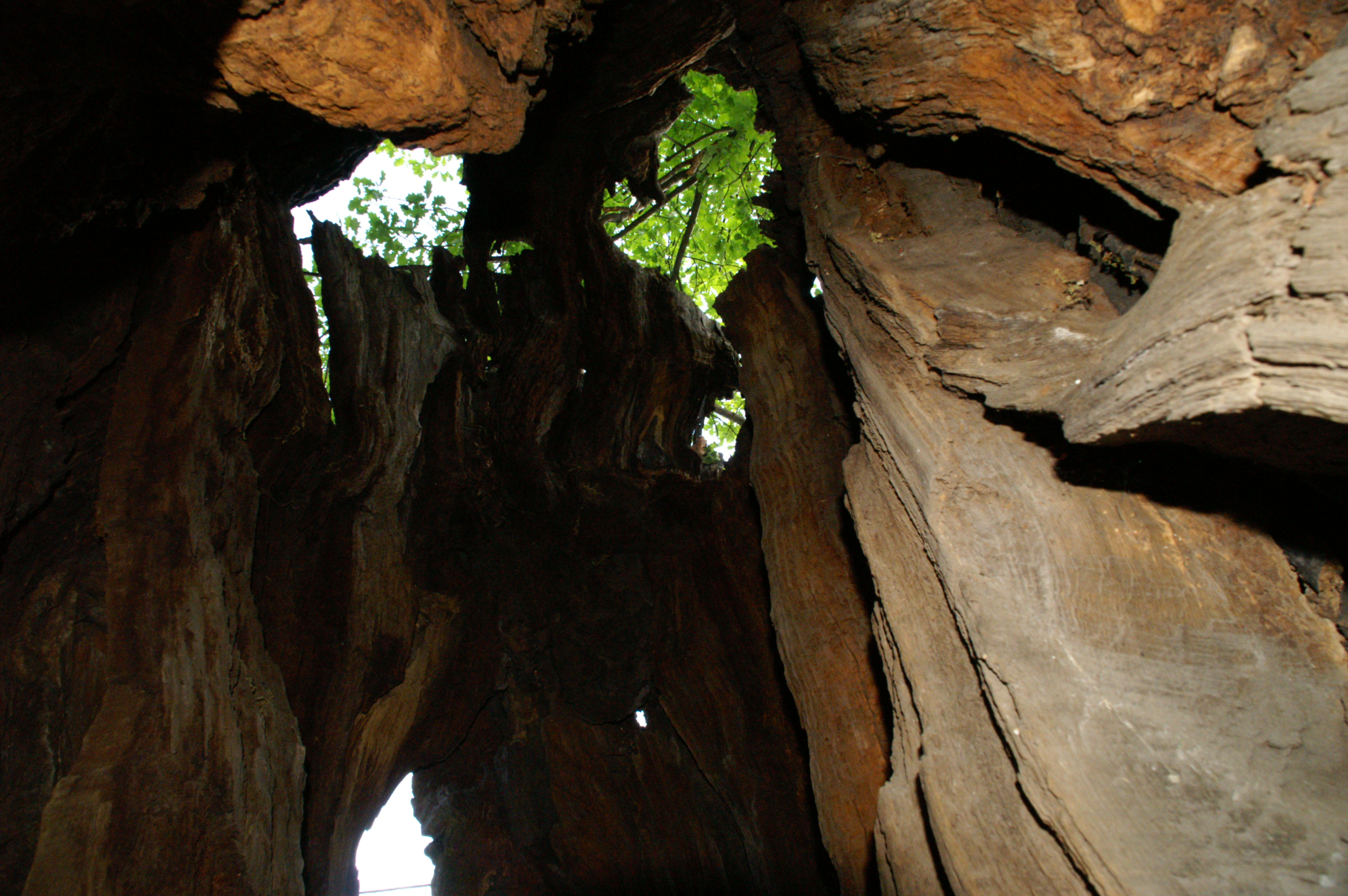
The hollow trunk from the inside in May 2007

The oak has been suffering from the sulphur mushroom infestation for centuries. The destruction of the trunk began when the oak was already weakened. In an entry in the parish register of the Nöbdenitz parish in 1598, the oak is described with the following words:

"A hollow oak tree dating back to pagan times."

In recent years, however, no new fruiting bodies of the sulphur fungus have been found on the oak.

The oak was struck by lightning in 1815. During a storm, most of which is dated to 1820, but some sources also date it to 1812 or 1819, the crown broke off at a height of around ten metres. Several strong branches also broke off. To this day, the oak has only slowly recovered from this event.

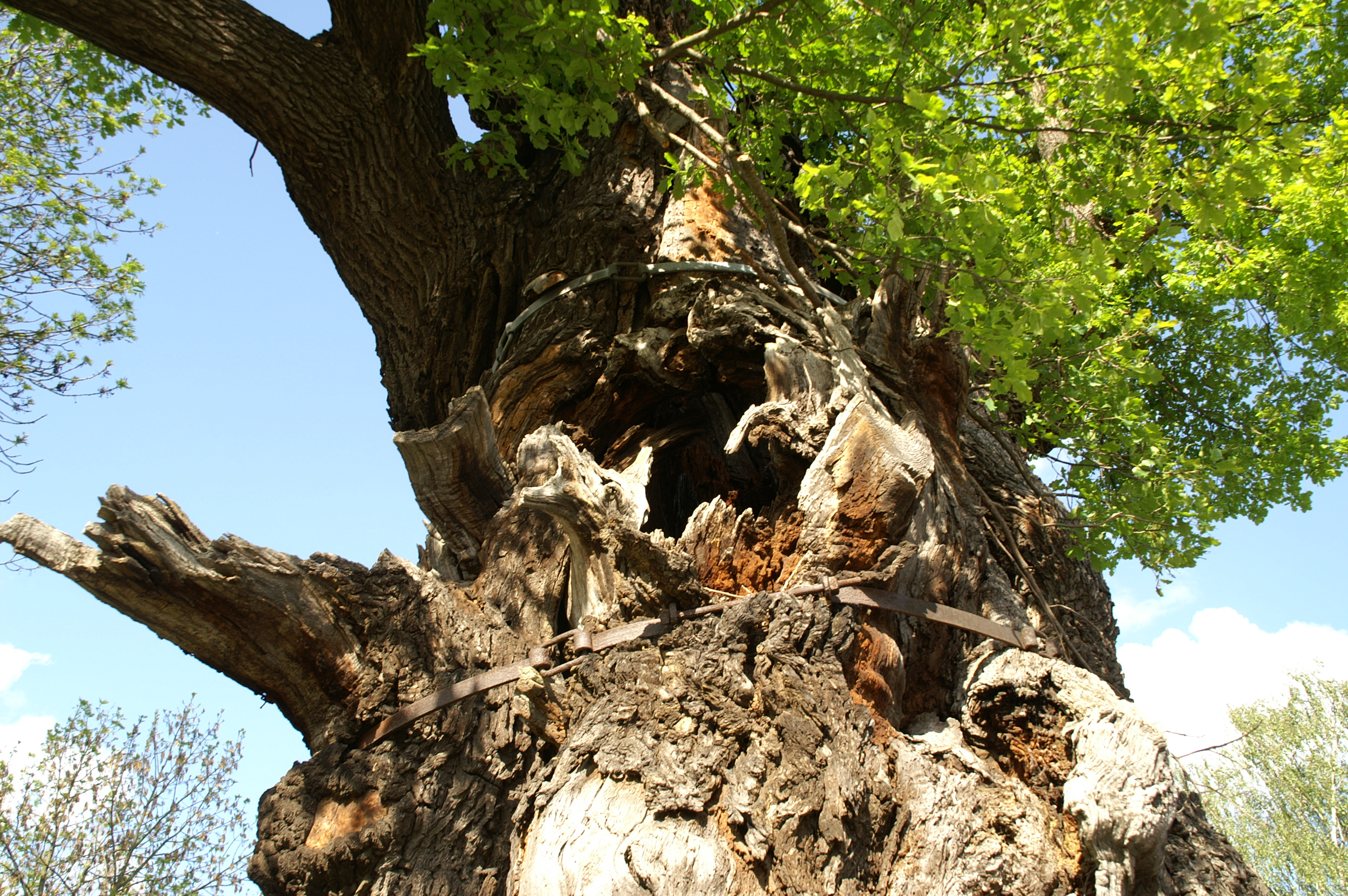
Trunk torso with two iron bands in May 2007

In 1826, Friedrich August Schmidt wrote about this oak tree:

"Long before, he had chosen an old oak tree - which rises in the centre of the village of Nöbdenitz and in whose cool shade he had often rested, even in convivial circles, on moss seats placed there and written down some of his witty, aphoristically depicted life experiences - as his burial place; he wanted to rest under its trunk without a coffin, like his princely friend Ernst II. His will was followed exactly. The corpse, brought from Altenburg to Nöbdenitz, was buried in a seated position close to the oak tree; and only the tree marks the place where his earthly body slumbers."

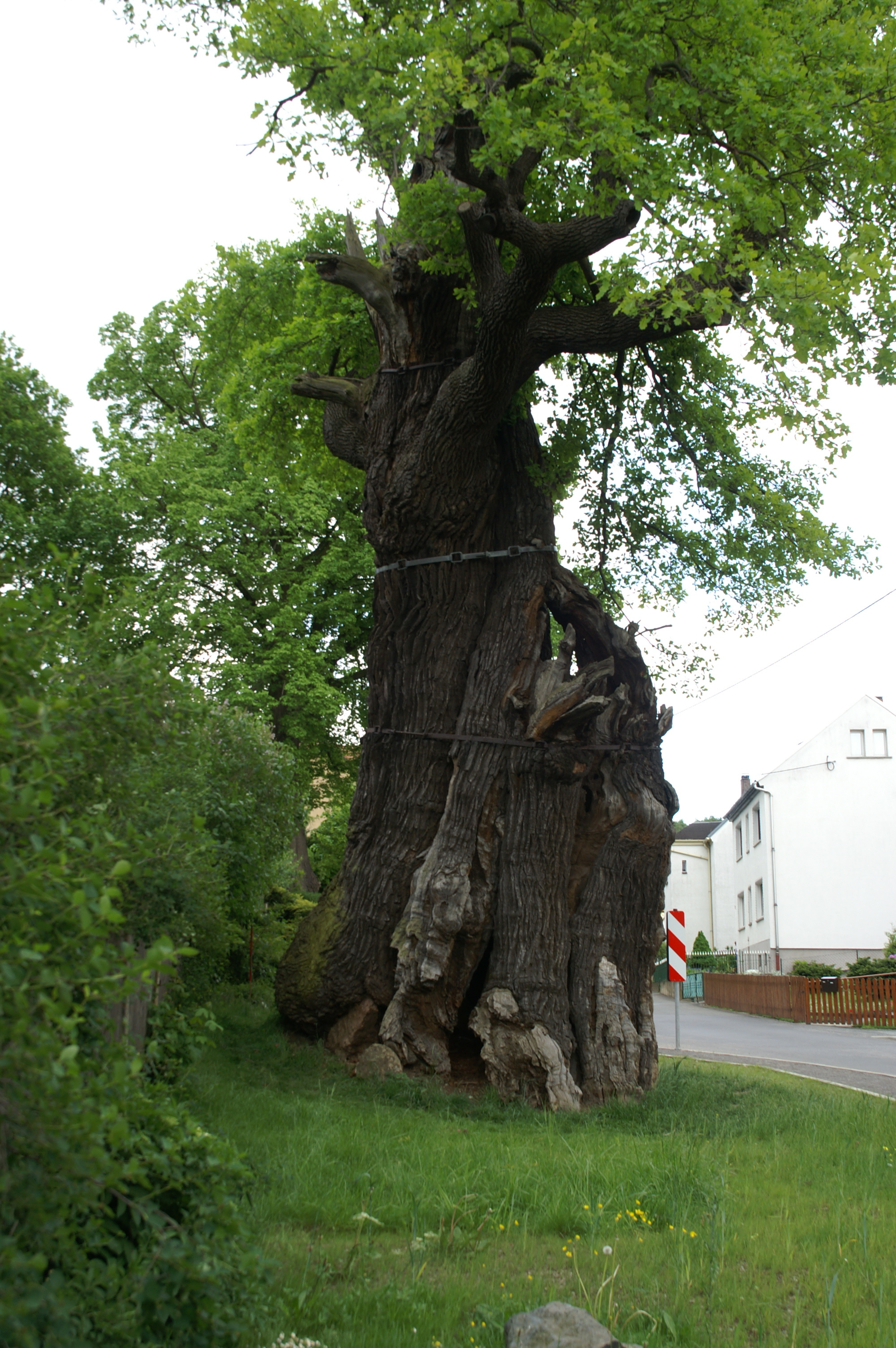
Grave oak in Nöbdenitz, May 2007

The Berlin antiquities researcher Gustav Parthey, who was visiting Duchess Anna Dorothea von Kurland in Löbichau, wrote about the oak in his diary:

"[...] We gazed in awe at a huge oak tree standing in the centre of the village. Popular belief made it a druid tree of the pagan Germanic tribes, and botanists estimated it to be 2000 years old. In the hollow of the trunk, 10 to 20 people could stand side by side. The minister had ordered that it should be buried under the oak so that its earthly remains could reach the open air not far away as sprouting branches and green leaves [...]"

In 1937, building official Berg described the condition of the oak tree:

"The age of the oak standing not far from the church and churchyard in the parish garden is estimated at 2000 years. Even if the accuracy of this estimate cannot be proven, it is nevertheless certain that the oak is by far the oldest tree in the area. [...] The centuries have also left their mark on the inside of the tree, as the almost completely rotten and hollow trunk shows. Inside it hides a rather spacious cave, the entrance to which is closed with a barred door [...] Despite the loss of its crown and core, the trunk, held together by strong iron bands, lives on, turns green again every year, bears abundant fruit and, with its gnarled, defiant form, is a venerable natural monument."

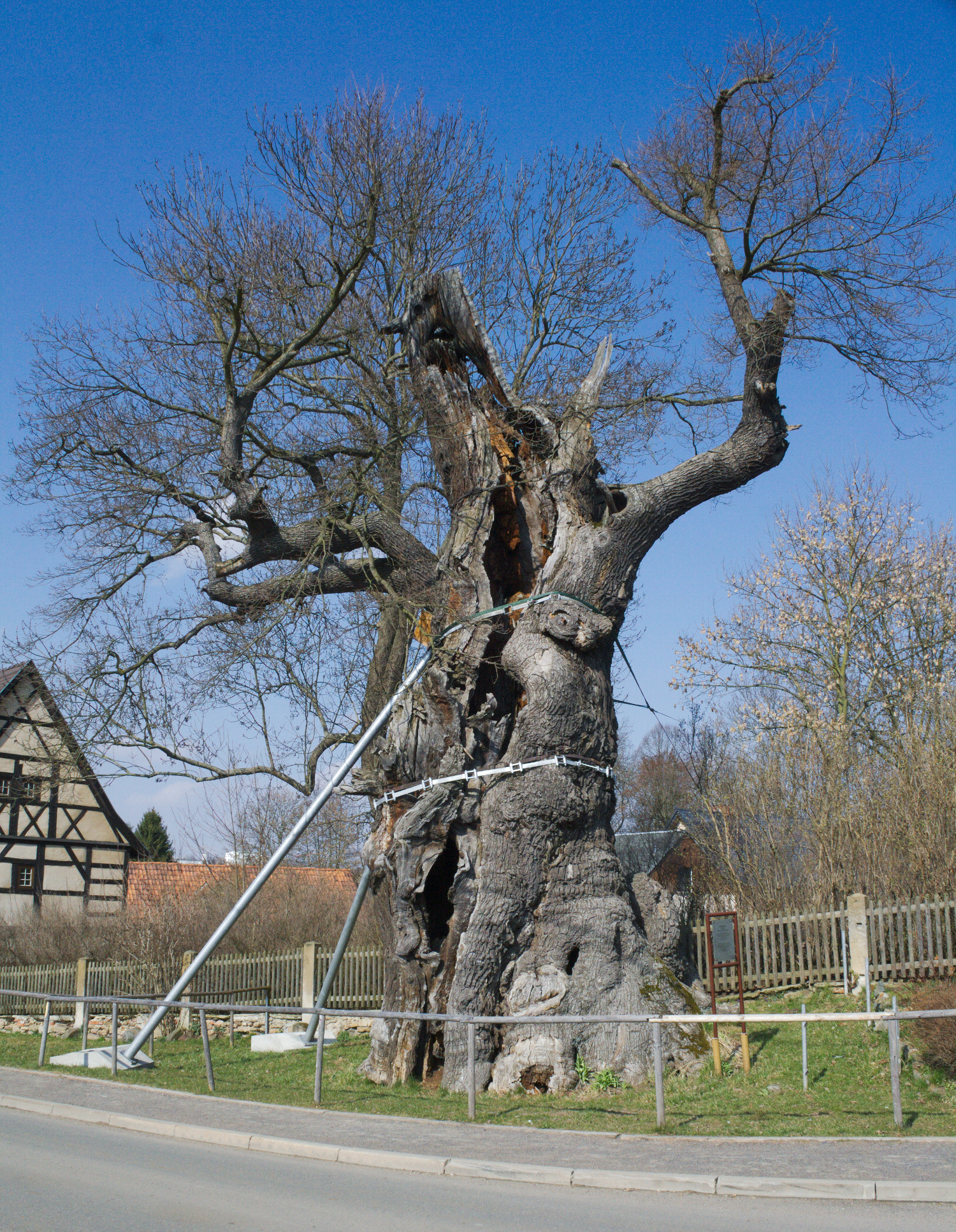
Grave oak in Nöbdenitz, March 2011

The oak has been listed as a natural monument since 1940. The village road passing by was widened and paved in the second half of the 20th century, bringing the tarmac surface right up to the western base of the trunk. In the course of widening the road, a sewer pipe and a natural gas pipeline were laid, which touched the root area. The asphalted road surface also affected the life of the oak, as the soil quality in the area of the roots below the asphalt surface no longer corresponded to the previous conditions. The oak had less precipitation at its disposal, most of which ran off above ground. When the road was removed, the lowest strong branch facing the road was presumably also removed.

Several branches were pruned in the past, and are now ten to 30 centimetres long. The central of the three iron bands holding the tree together was replaced. In August 2006, a crumbling house opposite the oak was demolished, and the road was moved there in 2007 in order to eliminate the damage to the tree caused by soil compaction. This gave the oak tree more moisture again and improved aeration of the roots in the loosened soil. The hope is that this will prolong its life. It was also proposed to provide support for the crown area.

In 2009, the oak was in danger of collapsing. The mighty crown of the tree was only held up by the outer edge of the trunk. According to an expert opinion, the tree was no longer stable; the centre support ring could no longer fulfil its task. An additional iron ring was therefore attached to the centre part of the trunk. A structural engineering firm carried out a structural design to calculate the exact load point of the tree and take the pressure off the trunk. Two steel pipes were embedded in a concrete foundation and now support the tree at the calculated point. To prevent the trunk from falling over onto the road and pavement in the event of buckling, two additional cables were stretched from the parish garden to the oak tree. The entire measure cost around 13,000 euros. The community of Nöbdenitz paid 5,000 euros, the rest was covered by the district.

In May 2014, there were plans to fell the oak tree because it posed a threat to road safety. However, nationwide public protests succeeded in saving the natural monument.

== Thümmel gravesite ==
The oak is considered to be the only tree in Germany with a grave. Hans Wilhelm von Thümmel, born in 1744 in a manor near Leipzig, rests in the hollow interior of the root area. He died on 1 March 1824 at the age of 80 and was buried following his will on 3 March 1824 in a walled crypt in the root area of the oak tree. This burial was authorised by the ducal government and is documented in the church register. After the funeral speech, the body was laid on a moss bench without a coffin. The top of the crypt was closed with three natural stones and an officially prescribed 30-centimetre-thick layer of slaked lime was applied to seal the crypt. The burial is described in the death register of the parish of Nöbdenitz in 1824:

"Died in Altenburg on 1 March 1824 at 1 o'clock in the morning. Buried under the parish realm purchased by the blessed Lord Privy Councillor with the permission of the ducal government in a walled crypt - walled against all fears of a dangerous evaporation of the dead body - with a speech."

So that the oak could be used as a place of worship, a bench made from a hollow willow trunk and a wooden console were placed inside the hollow trunk. The cracks in the trunk were sealed with moss, the place of worship was closed off from the street by an iron gate and sandstone pillars and a picket fence enclosed the oak. A rusty vertical iron rail on the trunk, to which the door was attached, is all what is left of the iron door.

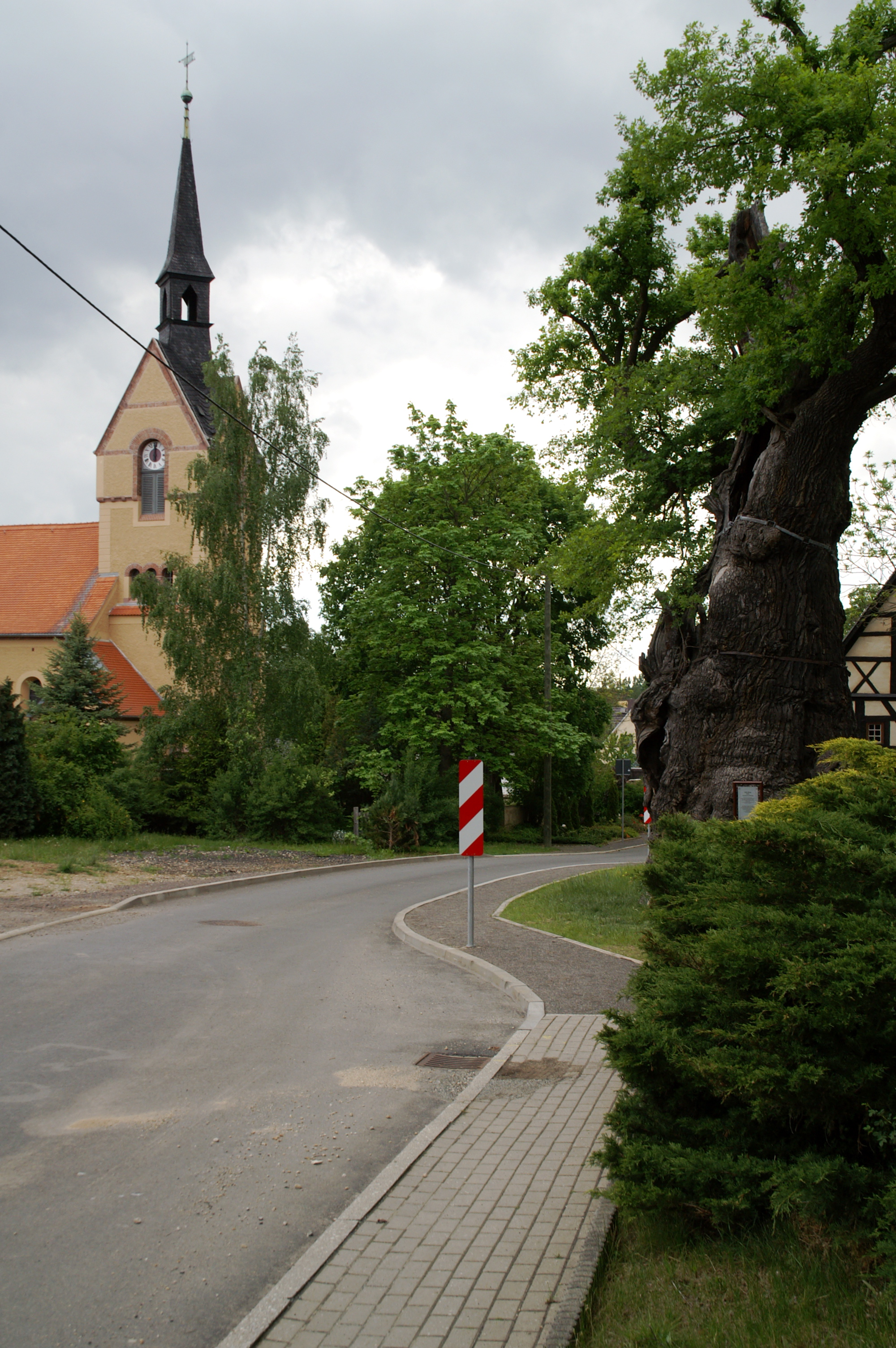
Grave oak and church in May 2007

=== Hans Wilhelm von Thümmel ===
Thümmel's connection with Nöbdenitz began in 1785, when he married the manor owner Charlotte von Rothkirch-Trach. She later inherited the manors of Nöbdenitz and Untschen. Thümmel held many different positions. He held various offices at the court of the Duchy of Saxe-Gotha-Altenburg and became a friend of Duke Ernest II. He progressed from page to Privy Councillor and later even to Minister. Between 1803 and 1808, he undertook several diplomatic missions to Berlin, Paris, Copenhagen and other cities. He also became famous for founding the Chamber Lending Bank and promoting the road system. He retired from the ducal service in 1817, where he had exerted great influence. Thümmel was also involved in land surveying and left behind an extensive topographical map series at the end of his service. This comprised the regions of Ronneburg and Altenburg and became known as the Thümmel maps, which were completed in 1813. After this, Thümmel often stayed in Nöbdenitz and also visited Duchess Anna Dorothea von Kurland, as he belonged to the circle of poets at the Musenhof until 1821. He was very romantically inclined and laid out various gardens and parks. After he retired, he also created a garden in Nöbdenitz. The construction of the gardens and parks cost the former minister a lot of money, so he eventually became penniless. This led to frequent disputes between him and his wife. During one such argument, she shouted at him: "Without marriage, you wouldn't even have enough land for your grave!"

The aggrieved husband then bought the oak tree from the parish, which was located in the parish garden at the time, to use it as a burial place after his death. A description of the gravesite was given by the building inspector Berg in 1937:

The entrance to this probably unique earth burial was walled up with boulders except for a small slip opening and closed with an iron grille door.

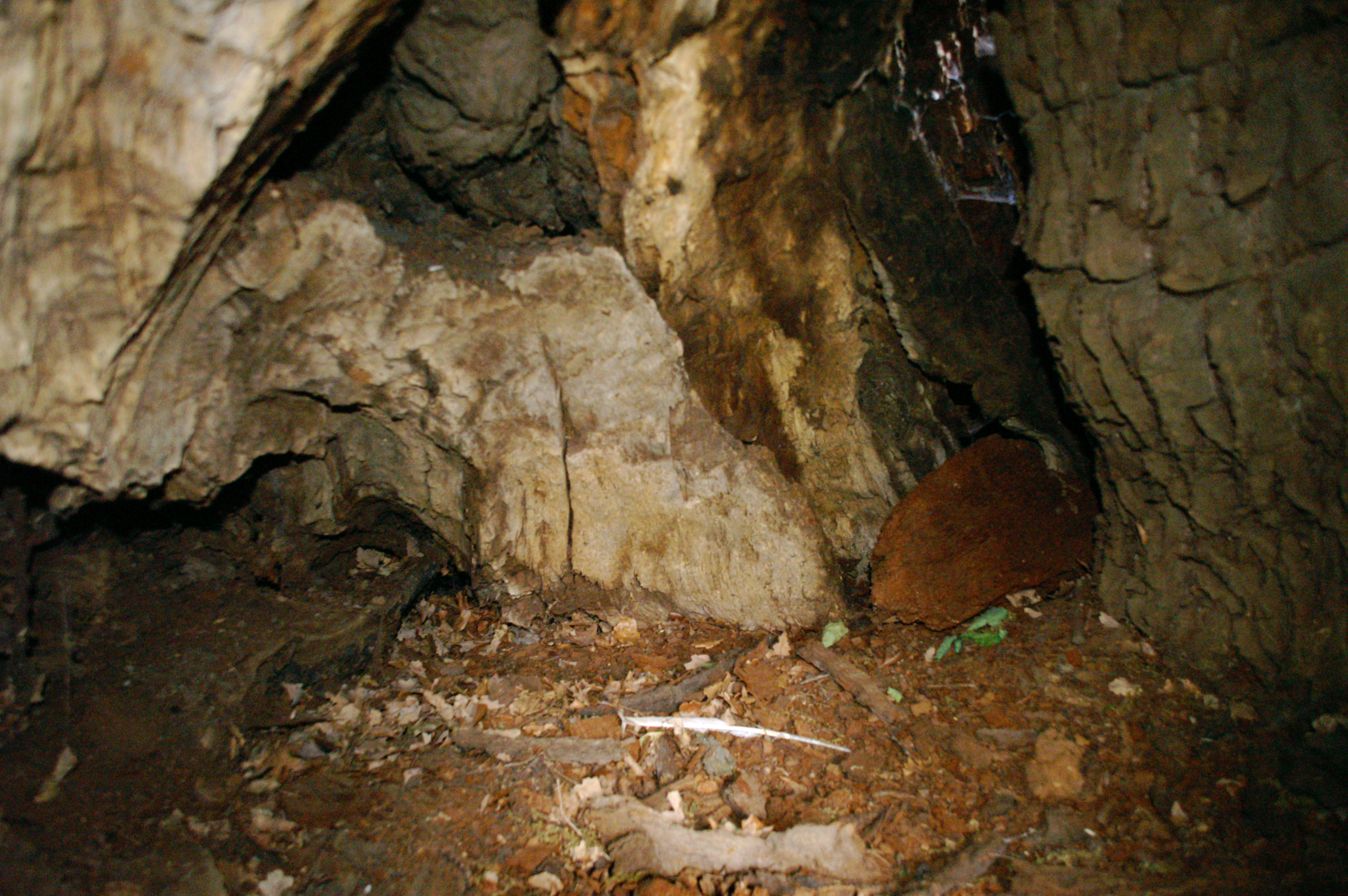
Interior of the trunk in May 2007

=== Examination of the grave ===
Many stories were told about the corpse under the oak tree. For several decades, it was reported that the dead man had been walled into the oak while sitting on a chair. Others doubted that there even was a dead body in the oak. In order to finally clarify the matter, local historian Ernst Bräunlich from Posterstein, who had been a teacher in Nöbdenitz for many years, tried to investigate the facts 135 years after Thümmel's death. On 8 April 1959, he and his pupils, whom he was able to recruit for this investigation, discovered a devotional room in the trunks cave. Inside were a broken vase, a rotten wooden console and the remains of metal wreath bows. They then dug a hole in the floor and, after removing soil and rotten wood, found the 20-centimetre-thick layer of scale lime and the three natural stone slabs. The cavity underneath could be illuminated through a gap with a torch, revealing a skeleton lying perpendicular to the former carriageway of the village road and with its head facing south. The two-metre-long grave was 1.3 metres deep and 85 centimetres wide. The discovery of the skeleton dispelled any doubts about the tree grave.
