= Zedlitz =

- Municipality
- Coat of arms

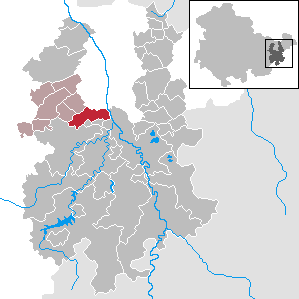
- Location of Zedlitz within Greiz district
- Interactive map of Zedlitz
- Location within Germany Location within Thuringia
- Coordinates: 50°48′51″N 12°1′49″E
- Country: Germany
- State: Thuringia
- District: Greiz
- Municipal assoc.: Münchenbernsdorf

Government
  - Mayor (2022–28): Lutz Schoßee

Area
  - Total: 13.05 km^{2} (5.04 sq mi)
- Elevation: 257 m (843 ft)

Population (2025-12-31)
  - Total: 709
  - Density: 54.3/km^{2} (141/sq mi)
- Time zone: UTC+01:00 (CET)
  - Summer (DST): UTC+02:00 (CEST)
- Postal codes: 07557
- Dialling codes: 036603
- Vehicle registration: GRZ
- Website: www.rathaus-muenchenbernsdorf.de

Zedlitz is a municipality in the district of Greiz, in Thuringia, Germany. The town has a municipal association with Münchenbernsdorf.
