= Schwarzbach, Thuringia =

Schwarzbach
- Municipality
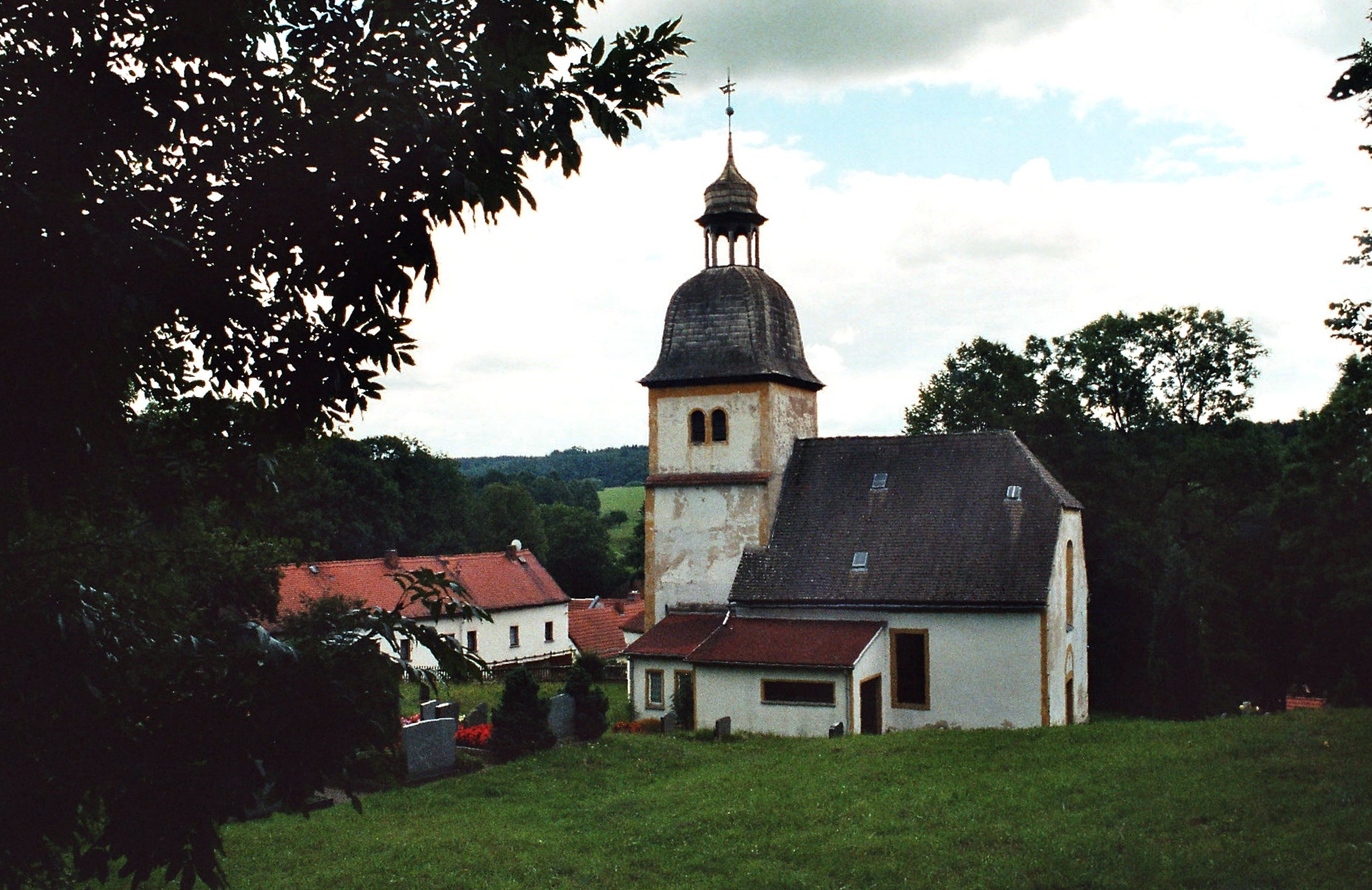
- Village church in Schwarzbach

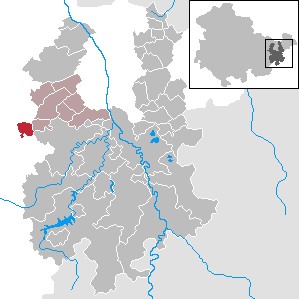
- Location of Schwarzbach within Greiz district
- Interactive map of Schwarzbach
- Location within Germany Location within Thuringia
- Coordinates: 50°48′N 11°53′E
- Country: Germany
- State: Thuringia
- District: Greiz
- Municipal assoc.: Münchenbernsdorf

Government
  - Mayor (2019–25): Steffen Gruber

Area
  - Total: 4.93 km^{2} (1.90 sq mi)
- Elevation: 309 m (1,014 ft)

Population (2025-12-31)
  - Total: 218
  - Density: 44.2/km^{2} (115/sq mi)
- Time zone: UTC+01:00 (CET)
  - Summer (DST): UTC+02:00 (CEST)
- Postal codes: 07589
- Dialling codes: 036604
- Vehicle registration: GRZ
- Website: www.rathaus-muenchenbernsdorf.de

Schwarzbach (German pronunciation: [ˈʃvaʁtsˌbax]) is a municipality in the district of Greiz, in Thuringia, Germany. The town has a municipal association with Münchenbernsdorf.
