= Zschöpel =

Village in Thuringia, Germany

- Village of Ponitz
- Interactive map of Zschöpel
- Location within Germany Location within Thuringia
- Coordinates: 50°52′7″N 12°24′44″E
- Country: Germany
- State: Thuringia
- District: Altenburger Land
- Town: Ponitz
- Elevation: 217–255 m (712–837 ft)

Population (2008-12-31)
  - Total: 129
- Time zone: UTC+01:00 (CET)
  - Summer (DST): UTC+02:00 (CEST)
- Postal codes: 04639
- Dialling codes: 034493

Zschöpel is a farming village in the Altenburger Land in Thuringia, Germany. It is part of the municipality Ponitz.

== History ==
The first mention of the settlement was 1140, under the name Tscheppelaw. It was called such as late as 1495.
