= Jrenäus Gersdorf =

German librarian and promoter of popular literature (1809–1860)

- Born: 1809; Monstab, near Altenburg, Thuringia
- Died: 1860 (aged 50–51); Altenburg, Duchy of Saxe-Altenburg
- Occupations: Librarian, promoter of popular literature
- Parents: Christoph Gotthelf Gersdorf (father); Concordia Wilhelmina Rüdel (mother)
- Relatives: Ernst Gotthelf Gersdorf (brother)

Jrenäus Gersdorf or Irenäus Gersdorf (1809–1860) was a German librarian and promoter of popular literature from the Duchy of Saxe-Altenburg. He was known for his efforts to improve and promote popular literature in northern Germany and his correspondence with Swiss writer Albert Bitzius (Jeremias Gotthelf).

== Early life and education ==
Jrenäus Gersdorf was born in 1809 in Monstab near Altenbourg in Thuringia. He was the son of Christoph Gotthelf Gersdorf, a pastor in Tautendorf in Thuringia, and Concordia Wilhelmina (or Wilhelmine) née Rüdel. His brother Ernst Gotthelf Gersdorf became director of the important university library of Leipzig.

Gersdorf studied theology in Leipzig from 1831 to 1834. In 1835, he became tutor to the daughters of the Duke of Saxe-Altenburg.

== Career ==
From 1844, Gersdorf served as librarian of the citizens' library of Altenbourg, and from 1849 until his death, he worked as sub-librarian of the ducal library.

In 1845, Gersdorf founded a society for the improvement and promotion of popular literature in northern Germany (Verein zur Hebung und Förderung der norddeutschen Volksliteratur) together with Otto Ruppius, Heinrich Wilhelm Löst, Ferdinand Schmidt, and Friedrich Adolph Wilhelm Diesterweg. However, this society only existed until 1848.

=== Correspondence with Jeremias Gotthelf ===
In September 1843, Gersdorf contacted by letter Albert Bitzius (alias Jeremias Gotthelf), whom he had recently described as an ideal popular writer in his study Das Volksschriftenwesen der Gegenwart (The Popular Literature Movement of the Present). In this same publication, he had also presented a concept for a magazine devoted to popular literature in German, for which he hoped to gain his correspondent as a collaborator. Bitzius refused to collaborate, but in his rare though lengthy letters, he expressed himself several times on the poetic aspects of his popular writing.

It was probably thanks to Gersdorf's book, published in 1843, that Gotthilf Ferdinand Döhner, a member of the synodal council and founder of a society for the distribution of good literature at low prices in Zwickau (Verein zur Verbreitung guter und wohlfeiler Volksschriften), became acquainted with Bitzius's works. In October 1843, Döhner asked Bitzius to write a novel for the society, which appeared in 1846 under the title Jacobs, des Handwerksgesellen, Wanderungen durch die Schweiz (Jacob the Journeyman's Travels through Switzerland).

In 1846, Gersdorf and Bitzius ended their relationship following disagreements. Otto Ruppius had worked, on behalf of the Verein zur Hebung und Förderung der norddeutschen Volksliteratur, on a German version of Wie Uli der Knecht glücklich wird (1841) without consulting Bitzius, who had already agreed to a similar project with Berlin publisher Julius Springer.

=== Later years and influence ===
Following the rapid decline of his literary society, Jrenäus Gersdorf played no further role in promoting popular literature after 1843. However, the Zwickau association, which according to its statutes published and distributed at low prices until the 1860s "popular readings" for "the lower and poor classes," became a model for the dissemination of popular literature in Switzerland. There were attempts to adopt its distribution system to also provide the Swiss rural population with instructional writings. However, the institutional structures necessary for this purpose were not established before 1890.

== Death ==
Gersdorf died in 1860 in Altenbourg.

== Works ==
- Das Volksschriftenwesen der Gegenwart. Mit besonderer Beziehung auf den Verein zur Verbreitung guter und wohlfeiler Volksschriften zu Zwickau (The Popular Literature Movement of the Present. With Special Reference to the Society for the Distribution of Good and Cheap Popular Writings in Zwickau), 1843
- Organ für das gesammte deutsche Volksschriftenwesen (Journal for the Entire German Popular Literature Movement), 1845-1846 (co-edited with Otto Ruppius)

== Bibliography ==
- Knoche, Michael: Volksliteratur und Volksschriftenvereine im Vormärz. Literaturtheoretische und institutionelle Aspekte einer literarischen Bewegung, 1986.
- Schütze, Sylvia: "Gersdorf, Irenäus", in: Diesterweg, Friedrich Adolph Wilhelm: Sämtliche Werke, section II, vol. 24: Briefe, amtliche Schreiben und Lebensdokumente aus den Jahren 1832 bis 1847, ed. by Heinemann, Manfred; Schütze, Sylvia, 2014, p. 789.
- Reiling, Jesko: ""mächtige Werkzeuge für bessere Gesittung und Bildung des Volkes". Schweizerische Vereine des 19. Jahrhunderts und ihre Bemühungen zur Förderung der Volksliteratur", in: Böning, Holger: Volksaufklärung ohne Ende? Vom Fortwirken der Aufklärung im 19. Jahrhundert, 2018, pp. 155–168.
