= Drogen =

- Ortsteil of Schmölln
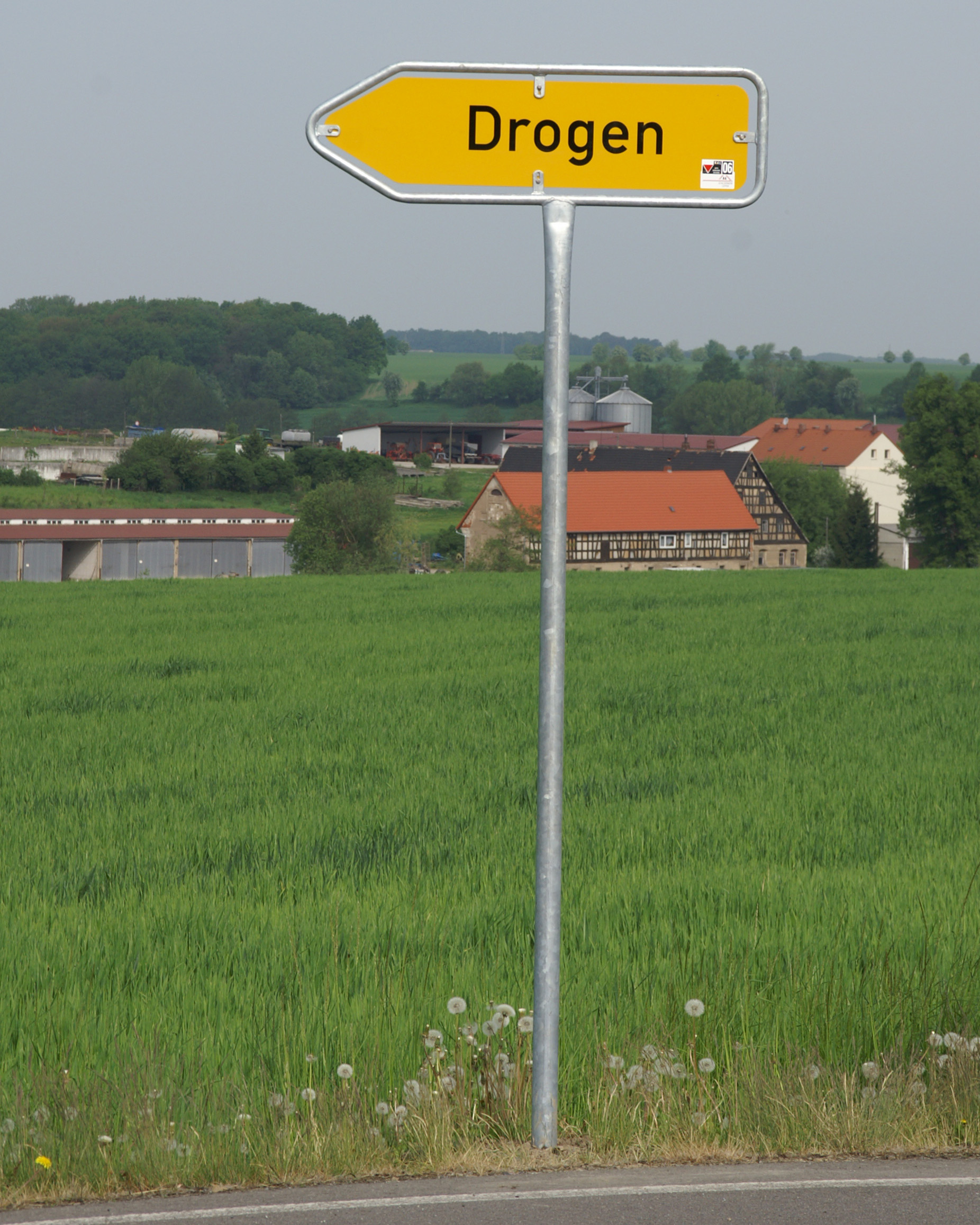
- Interactive map of Drogen
- Location within Germany Location within Thuringia
- Coordinates: 50°55′3″N 12°18′59″E
- Country: Germany
- State: Thuringia
- District: Altenburger Land
- Town: Schmölln

Area
  - Total: 4.28 km^{2} (1.65 sq mi)
- Elevation: 265 m (869 ft)

Population (2017-12-31)
  - Total: 123
  - Density: 28.7/km^{2} (74.4/sq mi)
- Time zone: UTC+01:00 (CET)
  - Summer (DST): UTC+02:00 (CEST)
- Postal codes: 04626
- Dialling codes: 034491
- Vehicle registration: ABG

Drogen (German pronunciation: [ˈdʁoːɡn̩]) is a village and a former municipality in the district Altenburger Land, in Thuringia, Germany. Since 1 January 2019, it is part of the town Schmölln.

== Geography ==
=== Neighboring municipalities ===
Municipalities near Drogen include Altkirchen, Dobitschen, Nöbdenitz, the city of Schmölln, and Wildenbörten.

=== Municipal organization ===
The municipality of Drogen consisted of two subdivisions: Drogen and Mohlis.

== Trivia ==
Drogen has an unusual name (It means Drugs in German), which has resulted in its street sign being frequently stolen.
