= Heyersdorf =

- Municipality
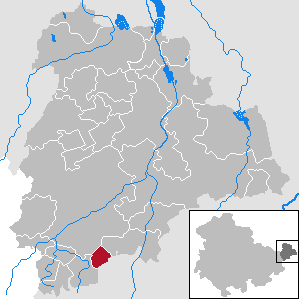
- Location of Heyersdorf within Altenburger Land district
- Interactive map of Heyersdorf
- Location within Germany Location within Thuringia
- Coordinates: 50°50′N 12°20′E
- Country: Germany
- State: Thuringia
- District: Altenburger Land

Government
  - Mayor (2021–27): Wilfried Koch

Area
  - Total: 3.78 km^{2} (1.46 sq mi)
- Elevation: 290 m (950 ft)

Population (2025-12-31)
  - Total: 111
  - Density: 29.4/km^{2} (76.1/sq mi)
- Time zone: UTC+01:00 (CET)
  - Summer (DST): UTC+02:00 (CEST)
- Postal codes: 04626
- Dialling codes: 03762
- Vehicle registration: ABG

Heyersdorf is a municipality in the Thuringian district of Altenburger Land.

== Geography ==
Heyersdorf is located near the municipalities of Ponitz, the city of Schmölln, and Thonhausen in the district of Altenburger Land; as well as near the city of Crimmitschau in the Saxon district of Zwickauer Land.

== History ==
Until 1920, Heyersdorf was part of the Kingdom of Saxony.

== Politics ==
Together with Ponitz, Heyersdorf is the assigning municipality for Gößnitz.

== Business and infrastructure ==
Heyersdorf is located on Bundesautobahn 4.

== Twin towns ==
Heyersdorf is twinned with:

- Kieselbronn, Germany, since 1993
- Bernin, France, since 1995
