= Göpfersdorf =

- Municipality
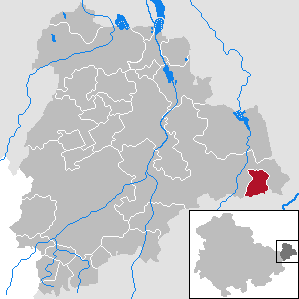
- Location of Göpfersdorf within Altenburger Land district
- Interactive map of Göpfersdorf
- Location within Germany Location within Thuringia
- Coordinates: 50°54′46″N 12°35′56″E
- Country: Germany
- State: Thuringia
- District: Altenburger Land
- Subdivisions: 2

Government
  - Mayor (2022–28): Jörg Schumann

Area
  - Total: 5.92 km^{2} (2.29 sq mi)
- Elevation: 260 m (850 ft)

Population (2025-12-31)
  - Total: 214
  - Density: 36.1/km^{2} (93.6/sq mi)
- Time zone: UTC+01:00 (CET)
  - Summer (DST): UTC+02:00 (CEST)
- Postal codes: 04618
- Dialling codes: 037608
- Vehicle registration: ABG

Göpfersdorf is a municipality in the district of Altenburger Land, in Thuringia, Germany. Göpfersdorf consists of two districts (Garbisdorf, Göpfersdorf).
