= Monstab =

- Municipality
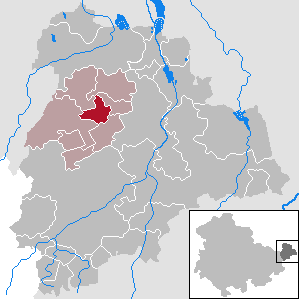
- Location of Monstab within Altenburger Land district
- Interactive map of Monstab
- Location within Germany Location within Thuringia
- Coordinates: 50°59′34″N 12°21′27″E
- Country: Germany
- State: Thuringia
- District: Altenburger Land
- Municipal assoc.: Rositz
- Subdivisions: 5

Government
  - Mayor (2022–28): Uwe Vogel

Area
  - Total: 5.66 km^{2} (2.19 sq mi)
- Elevation: 195 m (640 ft)

Population (2025-12-31)
  - Total: 366
  - Density: 64.7/km^{2} (167/sq mi)
- Time zone: UTC+01:00 (CET)
  - Summer (DST): UTC+02:00 (CEST)
- Postal codes: 04617
- Dialling codes: 034498
- Vehicle registration: ABG
- Website: www.monstab-web.de

Monstab is a municipality in the district Altenburger Land, in Thuringia, Germany. Monstab is located about 6 kilometers west from Altenburg.

== History ==
Within the German Empire (1871–1918), Monstab was part of the Duchy of Saxe-Altenburg.

== Notable people ==
- Jrenäus Gersdorf (1809–1860), librarian, born in Monstab
