= Münchenbernsdorf (Verwaltungsgemeinschaft) =

Municipal association in Thuringia, Germany

- Verwaltungsgemeinschaft
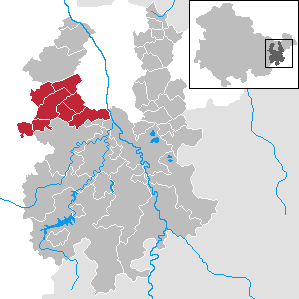
- Map of Greiz highlighting Münchenbernsdorf
- Interactive map of Münchenbernsdorf
- Location within Germany Location within Thuringia
- Coordinates: 50°49′N 11°56′E
- Country: Germany
- State: Thuringia
- District: Greiz
- Seat: Münchenbernsdorf
- Subdivisions: 8 municipalities

Area
  - Total: 69.9 km^{2} (27.0 sq mi)

Population (2025-12-31)
  - Total: 5,848
  - Density: 83.7/km^{2} (217/sq mi)
- Time zone: UTC+01:00 (CET)
  - Summer (DST): UTC+02:00 (CEST)
- Website: 69,9

Münchenbernsdorf is a Verwaltungsgemeinschaft ("administrative municipality community") in the district of Greiz, in Thuringia, Germany. The seat of the Verwaltungsgemeinschaft is in the town of Münchenbernsdorf. Its population is 5,848 as of December 2025.

== Subdivision ==
The Verwaltungsgemeinschaft Münchenbernsdorf consists of the following municipalities:

1. Bocka
2. Hundhaupten
3. Lederhose
4. Lindenkreuz
5. Münchenbernsdorf
6. Saara
7. Schwarzbach
8. Zedlitz
