= Rositz =

- Municipality
- Coat of arms

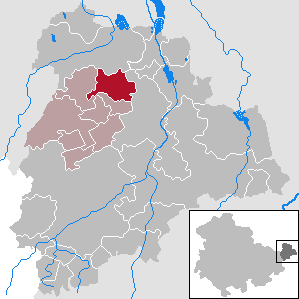
- Location of Rositz within Altenburger Land district
- Interactive map of Rositz
- Location within Germany Location within Thuringia
- Coordinates: 51°1′N 12°22′E
- Country: Germany
- State: Thuringia
- District: Altenburger Land
- Municipal assoc.: Rositz
- Subdivisions: 5

Government
  - Mayor (2024–30): Steffen Stange (Ind.)

Area
  - Total: 12.62 km^{2} (4.87 sq mi)
- Elevation: 185 m (607 ft)

Population (2025-12-31)
  - Total: 2,686
  - Density: 212.8/km^{2} (551.2/sq mi)
- Time zone: UTC+01:00 (CET)
  - Summer (DST): UTC+02:00 (CEST)
- Postal codes: 04617
- Dialling codes: 034498
- Vehicle registration: ABG

Rositz (German pronunciation: [ˈʁoːzɪts]) is a municipality in the district Altenburger Land, in Thuringia, Germany.

== History ==
Within the German Empire (1871-1918), Rositz was part of the Duchy of Saxe-Altenburg.

An RAF raid bombed the oil refinery in Rositz on February 14/15, 1945 as part of Operation Thunderclap.
