= Lederhose =

- Municipality
- Coat of arms

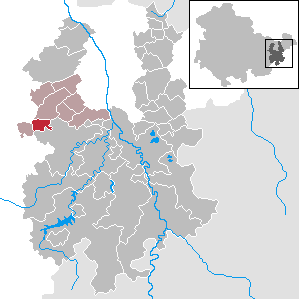
- Location of Lederhose within Greiz district
- Interactive map of Lederhose
- Location within Germany Location within Thuringia
- Coordinates: 50°48′N 11°55′E
- Country: Germany
- State: Thuringia
- District: Greiz
- Municipal assoc.: Münchenbernsdorf

Government
  - Mayor (2022–28): Andreas Weber

Area
  - Total: 4.84 km^{2} (1.87 sq mi)
- Elevation: 345 m (1,132 ft)

Population (2025-12-31)
  - Total: 261
  - Density: 53.9/km^{2} (140/sq mi)
- Time zone: UTC+01:00 (CET)
  - Summer (DST): UTC+02:00 (CEST)
- Postal codes: 07589
- Dialling codes: 036604
- Vehicle registration: GRZ

Lederhose is a municipality in the Greiz district of Thuringia, Germany. The town has a municipal association with Münchenbernsdorf. The name is a well-known example of an unusual place name as it is synonymous with the German term for Lederhosen, hence the coat of arms. The name of the village derives probably from the Slavic name Ludorad and has no historical link to the piece of clothes. The national A9 expressway has an interchange named after the rather small village which makes the name appearing regularly in traffic reporting via radio.
