= Rositz (Verwaltungsgemeinschaft) =

- Verwaltungsgemeinschaft
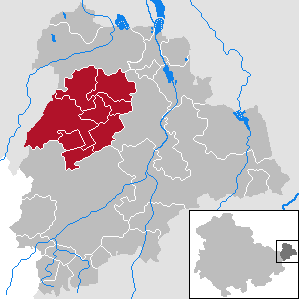
- Map of Altenburger Land highlighting Rositz
- Interactive map of Rositz
- Location within Germany Location within Thuringia
- Coordinates: 51°01′N 12°22′E
- Country: Germany
- State: Thuringia
- District: Altenburger Land
- Seat: Rositz
- Subdivisions: 8 municipalities

Area
  - Total: 80.7 km^{2} (31.2 sq mi)

Population (2025-12-31)
  - Total: 7,447
  - Density: 92.3/km^{2} (239/sq mi)
- Time zone: UTC+01:00 (CET)
  - Summer (DST): UTC+02:00 (CEST)
- Website: www.vg-rositz.de

Rositz is a Verwaltungsgemeinschaft ("collective municipality") in the district Altenburger Land, in Thuringia, Germany. The seat of the Verwaltungsgemeinschaft is in Rositz.

== Municipalities ==
The Verwaltungsgemeinschaft Rositz consists of the following municipalities:

1. Göhren
2. Göllnitz
3. Kriebitzsch
4. Lödla
5. Mehna
6. Monstab
7. Rositz
8. Starkenberg
