= Nöbdenitz =

- Ortsteil of Schmölln
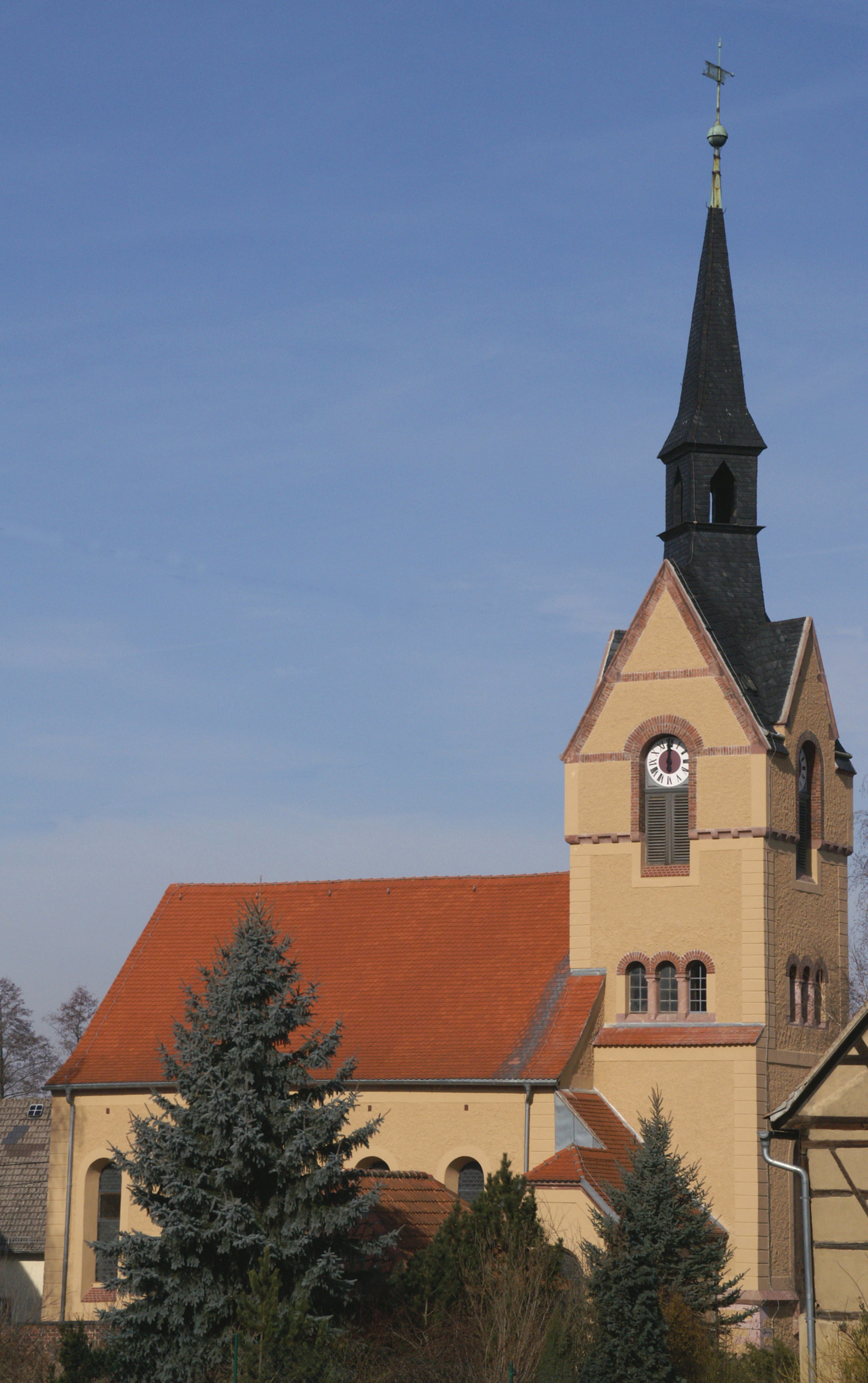
- Interactive map of Nöbdenitz
- Location within Germany Location within Thuringia
- Coordinates: 50°52′38″N 12°17′6″E
- Country: Germany
- State: Thuringia
- District: Altenburger Land
- Town: Schmölln

Area
  - Total: 10.02 km^{2} (3.87 sq mi)
- Elevation: 229 m (751 ft)

Population (2017-12-31)
  - Total: 857
  - Density: 85.5/km^{2} (222/sq mi)
- Time zone: UTC+01:00 (CET)
  - Summer (DST): UTC+02:00 (CEST)
- Postal codes: 04626
- Dialling codes: 034496
- Vehicle registration: ABG
- Website: www.noebdenitz.de

Nöbdenitz (German pronunciation: [ˈnœpdənɪts]) is a village and a former municipality in the district Altenburger Land, in Thuringia, Germany. Since 1 January 2019, it is part of the town Schmölln.

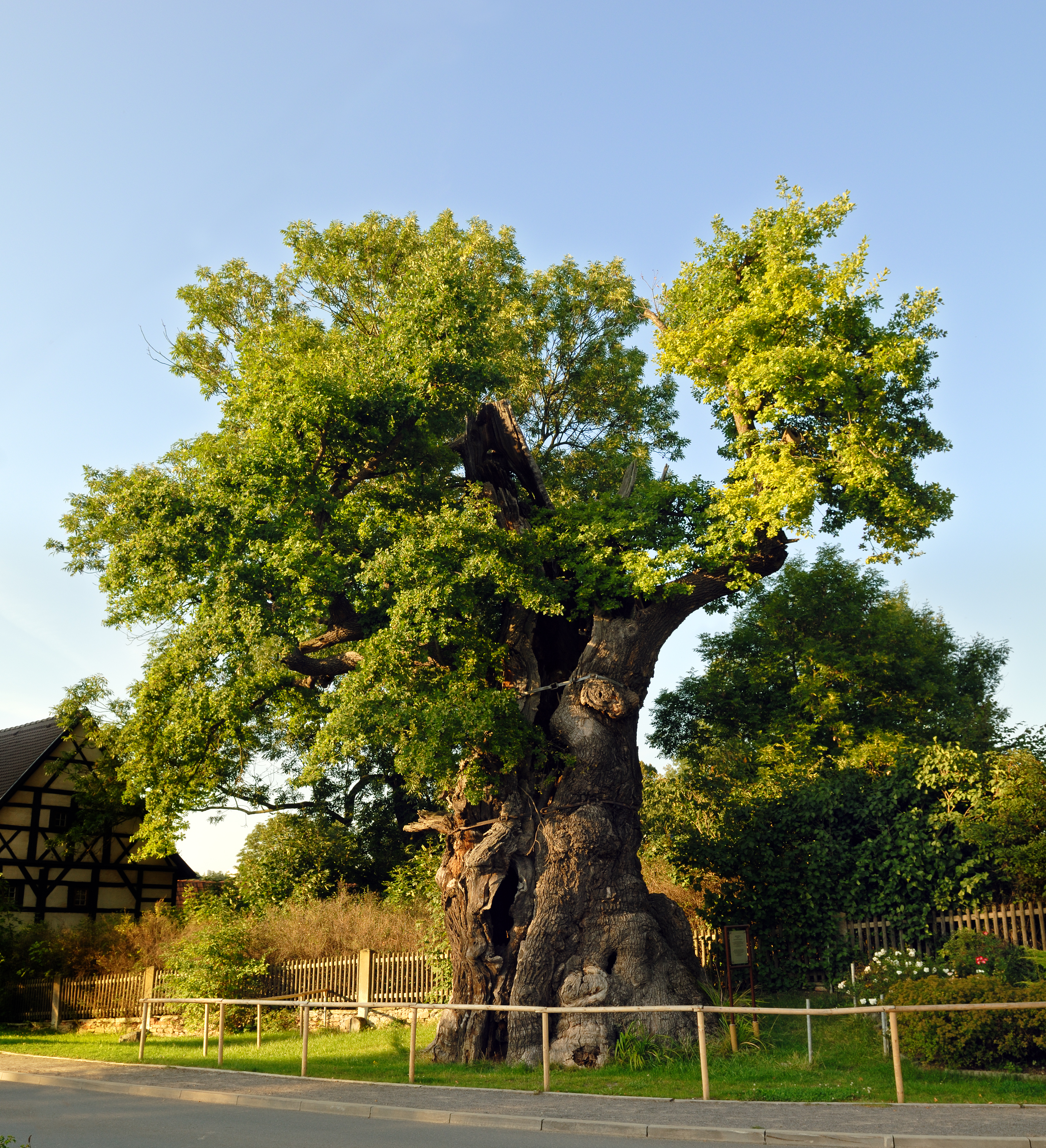
Nöbdenitz has an oak tree, which is known locally as the 1000-year-old oak, however the precise age is unknown.

== Geography ==
=== Neighboring municipalities ===
Municipalities near Nöbdenitz are Drogen, Löbichau, Posterstein, the city of Schmölln, Vollmershain, and Wildenbörten.

=== Municipal arrangement ===
The municipality of Nöbdenitz consists of 5 subdivisions: Nöbdenitz, Burkersdorf (in Schmölln), Lohma, Untschen, and Zagkwitz.

== Business and transportation ==
Nöbdenitz has a train station on the line that goes from Gera to Gößnitz as well as to Altenburg.

== History ==
Within the German Empire (1871–1918), Nöbdenitz was part of the Duchy of Saxe-Altenburg.

== See also ==
- Grave Oak
