= Oberes Sprottental =

Municipal association in Thuringia, Germany

- Verwaltungsgemeinschaft
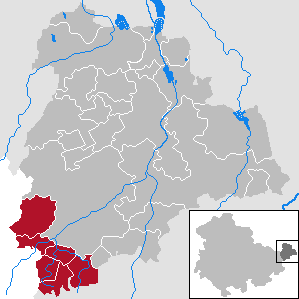
- Map of Altenburger Land highlighting Oberes Sprottental
- Interactive map of Oberes Sprottental
- Location within Germany Location within Thuringia
- Coordinates: 50°51′N 12°16′E
- Country: Germany
- State: Thuringia
- District: Altenburger Land
- Seat: Posterstein
- Subdivisions: 6 municipalities

Area
  - Total: 49.23 km^{2} (19.01 sq mi)

Population (2025-12-31)
  - Total: 2,680
  - Density: 54.4/km^{2} (141/sq mi)
- Time zone: UTC+01:00 (CET)
  - Summer (DST): UTC+02:00 (CEST)
- Website: www.vg-sprottental.de

Oberes Sprottental is a Verwaltungsgemeinschaft ("collective municipality") in the district Altenburger Land, in Thuringia, Germany. The seat of the Verwaltungsgemeinschaft is in Posterstein.

== Municipalities ==
The Verwaltungsgemeinschaft Oberes Sprottental consists of the following municipalities:

1. Heukewalde
2. Jonaswalde
3. Löbichau
4. Posterstein
5. Thonhausen
6. Vollmershain
