= Thonhausen =

- Municipality
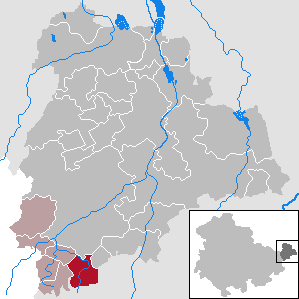
- Location of Thonhausen within Altenburger Land district
- Interactive map of Thonhausen
- Location within Germany Location within Thuringia
- Coordinates: 50°50′0″N 12°19′32″E
- Country: Germany
- State: Thuringia
- District: Altenburger Land
- Municipal assoc.: Oberes Sprottental

Government
  - Mayor (2022–28): Sandy Berschick

Area
  - Total: 9.40 km^{2} (3.63 sq mi)
- Elevation: 300 m (980 ft)

Population (2025-12-31)
  - Total: 507
  - Density: 53.9/km^{2} (140/sq mi)
- Time zone: UTC+01:00 (CET)
  - Summer (DST): UTC+02:00 (CEST)
- Postal codes: 04626
- Dialling codes: 034496
- Vehicle registration: ABG
- Website: www.thonhausen.de

Thonhausen is a municipality in the district of Altenburger Land in Thuringia, Germany. It belongs to the Verwaltungsgemeinschaft of Oberes Sprottental.

== Geography ==
=== Neighboring municipalities ===
Communities near Thonhausen are Jonaswalde, Heyersdorf, the City of Schmölln, and Vollmershain in the Landkreis Altenburger Land; as well as the City of Crimmitschau in the Saxon Landkreis of Zwickauer Land.

=== Municipal arrangement ===
Thonhausen has three districts: Thonhausen, Schönhaide, and Wettelswalde.

== Business and Infrastructure ==
Thonhausen is located at the Schmölln Interchange on Bundesautobahn 4.
