= Vollmershain =

- Municipality
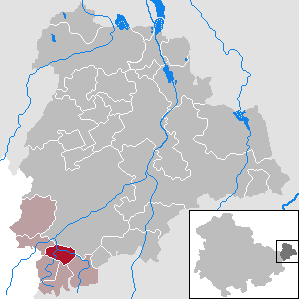
- Location of Vollmershain within Altenburger Land district
- Interactive map of Vollmershain
- Location within Germany Location within Thuringia
- Coordinates: 50°51′19″N 12°17′18″E
- Country: Germany
- State: Thuringia
- District: Altenburger Land
- Municipal assoc.: Oberes Sprottental

Government
  - Mayor (2022–28): Gerd Junghanns

Area
  - Total: 5.00 km^{2} (1.93 sq mi)
- Elevation: 250 m (820 ft)

Population (2025-12-31)
  - Total: 301
  - Density: 60.2/km^{2} (156/sq mi)
- Time zone: UTC+01:00 (CET)
  - Summer (DST): UTC+02:00 (CEST)
- Postal codes: 04626
- Dialling codes: 034496
- Vehicle registration: ABG
- Website: www.vollmershain.de

Vollmershain is a municipality in the Verwaltungsgemeinschaft of Oberes Sprottental in the Thuringian landkreis of Altenburger Land in Germany.

== Geography ==
=== The town's site ===
The village of Vollmershain is located along 4 km of the Sprotte. The highest part of the community is 306.2 m high on the side of the Mühlberg (308.1 m).

=== Neighbouring communities ===
Other municipalities near Vollmershain are Heukewalde, Jonaswalde, Posterstein, Nöbdenitz, Thonhausen, and the Weißbach district of Schmölln in the Landkreis of Altenburger Land.

== History ==
- The village was first mentioned in writing in 1181 in a tithe register of the Posau Cloister in Zeitz.
- During the Thirty Years' War, the Swedish General Wrangel had his headquarters in the area around Vollmershain in 1646.
- Within the German Empire (1871–1918), Vollmershein was part of the Duchy of Saxe-Altenburg.
