= Lödla =

- Municipality
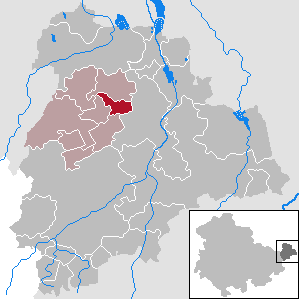
- Location of Lödla within Altenburger Land district
- Interactive map of Lödla
- Location within Germany Location within Thuringia
- Coordinates: 50°59′51″N 12°23′21″E
- Country: Germany
- State: Thuringia
- District: Altenburger Land
- Municipal assoc.: Rositz
- Subdivisions: 4

Government
  - Mayor (2022–28): Torsten Weiß

Area
  - Total: 4.30 km^{2} (1.66 sq mi)
- Elevation: 200 m (660 ft)

Population (2025-12-31)
  - Total: 723
  - Density: 168/km^{2} (435/sq mi)
- Time zone: UTC+01:00 (CET)
  - Summer (DST): UTC+02:00 (CEST)
- Postal codes: 04617
- Dialling codes: 03447, 034498
- Vehicle registration: ABG
- Website: www.rositz.de

Lödla is a municipality in the district Altenburger Land, in Thuringia, Germany.
