= Hundhaupten =

- Municipality
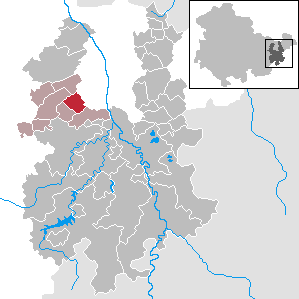
- Location of Hundhaupten within Greiz district
- Interactive map of Hundhaupten
- Location within Germany Location within Thuringia
- Coordinates: 50°49′49″N 11°59′24″E
- Country: Germany
- State: Thuringia
- District: Greiz
- Municipal assoc.: Münchenbernsdorf

Government
  - Mayor (2022–28): Gerlinde Pätzold-Häselbarth

Area
  - Total: 7.89 km^{2} (3.05 sq mi)
- Elevation: 325 m (1,066 ft)

Population (2025-12-31)
  - Total: 329
  - Density: 41.7/km^{2} (108/sq mi)
- Time zone: UTC+01:00 (CET)
  - Summer (DST): UTC+02:00 (CEST)
- Postal codes: 07557
- Dialling codes: 0365
- Vehicle registration: GRZ
- Website: www.hundhaupten.de

Hundhaupten (German pronunciation: [ˈhʊntˌhaʊptn̩]) is a municipality in the district of Greiz, in Thuringia, Germany. The town has a municipal association with Münchenbernsdorf.
