= Lindenkreuz =

Place in Thuringia, Germany

- Municipality
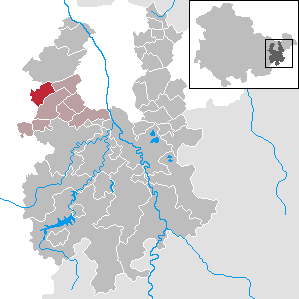
- Location of Lindenkreuz within Greiz district
- Interactive map of Lindenkreuz
- Location within Germany Location within Thuringia
- Coordinates: 50°51′N 11°55′E
- Country: Germany
- State: Thuringia
- District: Greiz
- Municipal assoc.: Münchenbernsdorf

Government
  - Mayor (2022–28): Dirk Eigler

Area
  - Total: 8.97 km^{2} (3.46 sq mi)
- Elevation: 300 m (980 ft)

Population (2025-12-31)
  - Total: 431
  - Density: 48.0/km^{2} (124/sq mi)
- Time zone: UTC+01:00 (CET)
  - Summer (DST): UTC+02:00 (CEST)
- Postal codes: 07589
- Dialling codes: 036604
- Vehicle registration: GRZ

Lindenkreuz is a municipality in the district of Greiz, Thuringia, Germany. The town has a municipal association with Münchenbernsdorf.
