= Kriebitzsch =

- Municipality
- Coat of arms

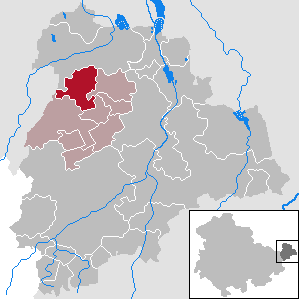
- Location of Kriebitzsch within Altenburger Land district
- Interactive map of Kriebitzsch
- Location within Germany Location within Thuringia
- Coordinates: 51°1′27″N 12°20′23″E
- Country: Germany
- State: Thuringia
- District: Altenburger Land
- Municipal assoc.: Rositz
- Subdivisions: 3

Government
  - Mayor (2022–28): Sven Verch

Area
  - Total: 13.29 km^{2} (5.13 sq mi)
- Elevation: 200 m (660 ft)

Population (2025-12-31)
  - Total: 992
  - Density: 74.6/km^{2} (193/sq mi)
- Time zone: UTC+01:00 (CET)
  - Summer (DST): UTC+02:00 (CEST)
- Postal codes: 04617
- Dialling codes: 03448
- Vehicle registration: ABG
- Website: www.rositz.de

Kriebitzsch (German pronunciation: [ˈkʁiːbɪtʃ]) is a municipality in the district Altenburger Land, in Thuringia, Germany.
