= Bocka =

- Municipality
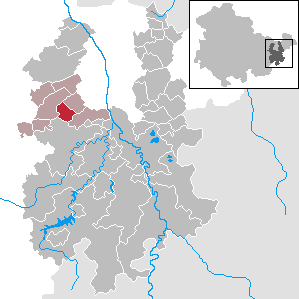
- Location of Bocka within Greiz district
- Interactive map of Bocka
- Location within Germany Location within Thuringia
- Coordinates: 50°49′N 11°58′E
- Country: Germany
- State: Thuringia
- District: Greiz
- Municipal assoc.: Münchenbernsdorf
- Subdivisions: 2

Government
  - Mayor (2022–28): Ingo Kaiser

Area
  - Total: 6.05 km^{2} (2.34 sq mi)
- Elevation: 330 m (1,080 ft)

Population (2025-12-31)
  - Total: 481
  - Density: 79.5/km^{2} (206/sq mi)
- Time zone: UTC+01:00 (CET)
  - Summer (DST): UTC+02:00 (CEST)
- Postal codes: 07589
- Dialling codes: 036604
- Vehicle registration: GRZ
- Website: rathaus-muenchenbernsdorf.de

Bocka (German pronunciation: [ˈbɔka]) is a municipality in the district of Greiz, in Thuringia, Germany. The town has a municipal association with Münchenbernsdorf.
