= Langenleuba-Niederhain =

- Municipality
- Coat of arms

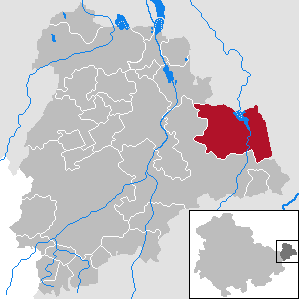
- Location of Langenleuba-Niederhain within Altenburger Land district
- Interactive map of Langenleuba-Niederhain
- Location within Germany Location within Thuringia
- Coordinates: 50°57′33″N 12°35′45″E
- Country: Germany
- State: Thuringia
- District: Altenburger Land
- Subdivisions: 8

Government
  - Mayor (2022–28): Carsten Helbig (SPD)

Area
  - Total: 39.65 km^{2} (15.31 sq mi)
- Elevation: 205 m (673 ft)

Population (2025-12-31)
  - Total: 1,675
  - Density: 42.24/km^{2} (109.4/sq mi)
- Time zone: UTC+01:00 (CET)
  - Summer (DST): UTC+02:00 (CEST)
- Postal codes: 04618
- Dialling codes: 034497 u.a.
- Vehicle registration: ABG
- Website: gemeinde-langenleuba-niederhain.de

Langenleuba-Niederhain is a municipality in the district Altenburger Land, in Thuringia, Germany.

== History ==
Within the German Empire (1871–1918), Langenleuba-Niederhain was part of the Duchy of Saxe-Altenburg.
