= Münchenbernsdorf =

- Town
- Coat of arms

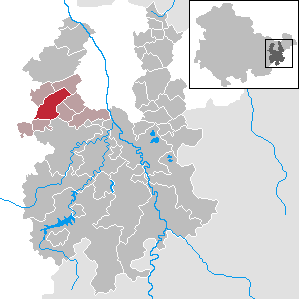
- Location of Münchenbernsdorf within Greiz district
- Interactive map of Münchenbernsdorf
- Location within Germany Location within Thuringia
- Coordinates: 50°49′N 11°56′E
- Country: Germany
- State: Thuringia
- District: Greiz
- Municipal assoc.: Münchenbernsdorf
- Subdivisions: 3

Government
  - Mayor (2024–30): Andreas Stehfest

Area
  - Total: 15.45 km^{2} (5.97 sq mi)
- Elevation: 325 m (1,066 ft)

Population (2025-12-31)
  - Total: 2,842
  - Density: 183.9/km^{2} (476.4/sq mi)
- Time zone: UTC+01:00 (CET)
  - Summer (DST): UTC+02:00 (CEST)
- Postal codes: 07589
- Dialling codes: 036604
- Vehicle registration: GRZ
- Website: muenchenbernsdorf.de

Münchenbernsdorf (German pronunciation: [ˌmʏnçn̩ˈbɛʁnsdɔʁf]) is a town in the district of Greiz, in Thuringia, Germany. It is situated approximately 16 km southwest of Gera. The town is seat of a municipal association with eight members.

== Geography ==
Münchenbernsdorf is located 16 kilometers (9.9 mi) southwest of Gera, the third-largest city in Thuringia. The town is nestled on the gentle slopes of a hilly basin from where the creek named Görlitzbach originates. This stream flows northeastwards past Münchenbernsdorf's municipal neighborhoods, or villages, of Kleinbernsdorf, Kananda, and Schöna on its way to its mouth that opens into the White Elster river, just north of Gera. The basin represents the more western part of the White Elster watershed in this area. Within 2 kilometers west of Münchenbernsdorf, one finds the eastern watershed for the Saale river near the village of Tautendorf. A small branch of the Görlitzbach starts north of the town but is dammed to form several ponds. The larger pond (in German: Mahlteich) is used as an outdoor natural swimming pond in the summer. The run off from these ponds eventually flows into the Görlitzbach at Kleinbernsdorf.

=== Neighboring Municipalities ===
Surrounding Münchenbernsdorf are the following towns (clockwise from the north): Lindenkreuz, Saara, Hundhaupten, Bocka, Harth-Pöllnitz and Lederhose, all located in the administrative district of Greiz, as well as Renthendorf and Tautendorf in the Saale-Holzland district.

=== Municipal Subdivisions ===
Other than Münchenbernsdorf proper, there are the following municipal subdivisions, in order of their location downstream from Münchenbernsdorf along the Görlitzbach:

- Kleinbernsdorf
- Kanada
- Schöna

== History ==
The community was likely founded in the second half of the 12th century. A document dated August 17, 1251 from the lord protector (Vogt) of Weida (Weida, Thuringia) first mentions Münchenbernsdorf as a locality. The Partition of Leipzig of 1485 ceded the settlement to the Ernestiner nobility line. Then in 1571, it became part of Saxony. To punish the Kingdom of Saxony for its allegiance to Napoleon and France, the Vienna Congress of 1815 granted certain tracts that included Münchenberndorf to the Grand Duchy of Saxe-Weimar-Eisenach, then ruled by Grand Duke Charles Augustus (in German: Carl August). In the late 1800s and early 1900s, the community prospered economically through the introduction and growth of carpet factories, permitting the acquisition of town privileges (in German: Stadtrecht) in 1904. The town of Münchenbernsdorf itself is a member and seat of the Münchenbernsdorf (Verwaltungsgemeinschaft) (administrative municipality community) since March 9, 1992.
