= Lumpzig =

- Ortsteil of Schmölln
- Interactive map of Lumpzig
- Location within Germany Location within Thuringia
- Coordinates: 50°56′43″N 12°15′39″E
- Country: Germany
- State: Thuringia
- District: Altenburger Land
- Town: Schmölln

Area
  - Total: 10.74 km^{2} (4.15 sq mi)
- Elevation: 225–301 m (738–988 ft)

Population (2017-12-31)
  - Total: 493
  - Density: 45.9/km^{2} (119/sq mi)
- Time zone: UTC+01:00 (CET)
  - Summer (DST): UTC+02:00 (CEST)
- Postal codes: 04626
- Dialling codes: 034495
- Vehicle registration: ABG
- Website: gemeinde-lumpzig.jimdoweb.com

Lumpzig (German pronunciation: [ˈlʊmptsɪç]) is a village and a former municipality in the district Altenburger Land, in Thuringia, Germany. Since 1 January 2019, it is part of the town of Schmölln.
