= Heukewalde =

- Municipality
- Coat of arms

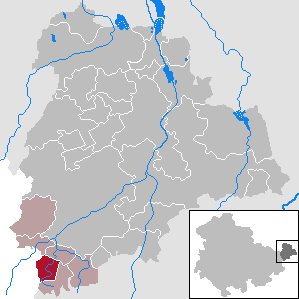
- Location of Heukewalde within Altenburger Land district
- Interactive map of Heukewalde
- Location within Germany Location within Thuringia
- Coordinates: 50°50′10″N 12°16′3″E
- Country: Germany
- State: Thuringia
- District: Altenburger Land
- Municipal assoc.: Oberes Sprottental

Government
  - Mayor (2022–28): Maik Piewak

Area
  - Total: 5.89 km^{2} (2.27 sq mi)
- Elevation: 275 m (902 ft)

Population (2025-12-31)
  - Total: 188
  - Density: 31.9/km^{2} (82.7/sq mi)
- Time zone: UTC+01:00 (CET)
  - Summer (DST): UTC+02:00 (CEST)
- Postal codes: 04626
- Dialling codes: 034496
- Vehicle registration: ABG
- Website: www.heukewalde.de

Heukewalde is a German municipality in the Thuringian Landkreis of Altenburger Land. It belongs to the Verwaltungsgemeinschaft of Oberes Sprottental.

== Geography ==
=== Neighboring Municipalities ===
Communities near Heukewalde include: Jonaswalde, Posterstein, and Vollmershain in the Landkreis of Altenburger Land; as well as Rückersdorf und Paitzdorf in the Landkreis of Greiz.

== History ==
Heukewalde was first mentioned in writing on December 9, 1152. From 1826 to 1920, it belonged to Saxe-Altenburg.

== Mayors ==
Bernhard Göpel, mayor from 1892 to 1917.
