= Jonaswalde =

- Municipality
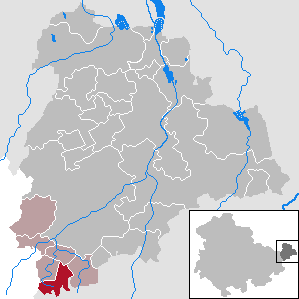
- Location of Jonaswalde within Altenburger Land district
- Interactive map of Jonaswalde
- Location within Germany Location within Thuringia
- Coordinates: 50°50′21″N 12°17′16″E
- Country: Germany
- State: Thuringia
- District: Altenburger Land
- Municipal assoc.: Oberes Sprottental
- Subdivisions: 2

Government
  - Mayor (2024–30): André Vohs

Area
  - Total: 6.65 km^{2} (2.57 sq mi)
- Elevation: 190 m (620 ft)

Population (2025-12-31)
  - Total: 312
  - Density: 46.9/km^{2} (122/sq mi)
- Time zone: UTC+01:00 (CET)
  - Summer (DST): UTC+02:00 (CEST)
- Postal codes: 04626
- Dialling codes: 034496
- Vehicle registration: ABG
- Website: www.jonaswalde.de

Jonaswalde is a municipality in the Thuringian district of Altenburger Land. It belongs to the Verwaltungsgemeinschaft of Oberes Sprottental.

== Geography ==
=== Neighboring municipalities ===
Nearby municipalities are Heukewalde, Thonhausen, and Vollmershain in the district of Altenburger Land; Rückersdorf in the district of Greiz; as well as the city of Crimmitschau in the Saxon district of Zwickauer Land.

=== Municipal arrangement ===
The community is divided into two subdivisions: Jonaswalde and Nischwitz.

== History ==
From 1826 to 1920, Jonaswalde was part of Saxe-Altenburg.
