= Saara (name) =

Female given name

Saara is a female given name in Finland and Estonia, derived from the biblical name Sarah. Its nameday is celebrated on the 19th of July. As of 2012, almost 20,000 people in Finland have this name. It was most popular in the 1980s and the 1990s.

== Notable people ==
- Saara Aalto (born 1987), Finnish singer
- Saara Chaudry (born 2004), Canadian actress
- Saara Deva (born 1994), Indian actress
- Saara Forsberg (born 1994), Finnish singer-songwriter
- Saara Kuugongelwa (born 1967), Prime Minister of Namibia
- Saara Lamberg, Finnish actress
- Sara Mustonen (born 1981), Swedish racing cyclist
- Saara Orav (born 2001), Estonian tennis player
- Saara Pius (born 1990), Estonian actress and singer
- Saara Ranin (1898–1992), Finnish actress and director
- Saara Tuominen (born 1986), Finnish ice hockey player
- Saara Hopea (1925–1982), Finnish designer
