= Mehna =

- Municipality
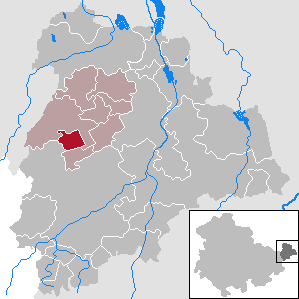
- Location of Mehna within Altenburger Land district
- Interactive map of Mehna
- Location within Germany Location within Thuringia
- Coordinates: 50°57′53″N 12°19′18″E
- Country: Germany
- State: Thuringia
- District: Altenburger Land
- Municipal assoc.: Rositz
- Subdivisions: 3

Government
  - Mayor (2022–28): Jens Stallmann

Area
  - Total: 4.69 km^{2} (1.81 sq mi)
- Elevation: 240 m (790 ft)

Population (2025-12-31)
  - Total: 260
  - Density: 55/km^{2} (140/sq mi)
- Time zone: UTC+01:00 (CET)
  - Summer (DST): UTC+02:00 (CEST)
- Postal codes: 04626
- Dialling codes: 034495
- Vehicle registration: ABG

Mehna is a municipality in the district Altenburger Land, in Thuringia, Germany.

== History ==
Within the German Empire (1871–1918), Mehna was part of the Duchy of Saxe-Altenburg.
