= Ponitz =

- Municipality
- Coat of arms

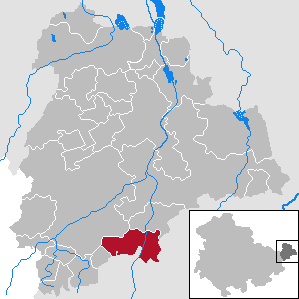
- Location of Ponitz within Altenburger Land district
- Interactive map of Ponitz
- Location within Germany Location within Thuringia
- Coordinates: 50°50′0″N 12°25′20″E
- Country: Germany
- State: Thuringia
- District: Altenburger Land
- Subdivisions: 5

Government
  - Mayor (2024–30): Marcel Greunke (CDU)

Area
  - Total: 17.13 km^{2} (6.61 sq mi)
- Elevation: 223 m (732 ft)

Population (2025-12-31)
  - Total: 1,407
  - Density: 82.14/km^{2} (212.7/sq mi)
- Time zone: UTC+01:00 (CET)
  - Summer (DST): UTC+02:00 (CEST)
- Postal codes: 04639
- Dialling codes: 034493 and 03764
- Vehicle registration: ABG

Ponitz (German pronunciation: [ˈpoːnɪts]) is a municipality in the district Altenburger Land, in Thuringia, Germany.

It is particularly famous for its Baroque organ by Gottfried Silbermann and for its spectacularly-eccentric Renaissance manor house. Districts of Ponitz are Zschöpel, Merlach, Guteborn and Grünberg.
