= Tautendorf =

- Municipality
- Location of Tautendorf within Saale-Holzland-Kreis district
- Interactive map of Tautendorf
- Location within Germany Location within Thuringia
- Coordinates: 50°49′N 11°54′E
- Country: Germany
- State: Thuringia
- District: Saale-Holzland-Kreis
- Municipal assoc.: Hügelland/Täler

Government
  - Mayor (2022–28): Volker Bauer

Area
  - Total: 5.29 km^{2} (2.04 sq mi)
- Elevation: 328 m (1,076 ft)

Population (2025-12-31)
  - Total: 140
  - Density: 26/km^{2} (69/sq mi)
- Time zone: UTC+01:00 (CET)
  - Summer (DST): UTC+02:00 (CEST)
- Postal codes: 07646
- Dialling codes: 036426
- Vehicle registration: SHK, EIS, SRO
- Website: www.huegelland-taeler.de

Tautendorf is a municipality in the district Saale-Holzland, in Thuringia, Germany.
