= Dobitschen =

- Ortsteil of Schmölln
- Interactive map of Dobitschen
- Location within Germany Location within Thuringia
- Coordinates: 50°57′22″N 12°16′54″E
- Country: Germany
- State: Thuringia
- District: Altenburger Land
- Town: Schmölln

Area
  - Total: 6.55 km^{2} (2.53 sq mi)
- Elevation: 255 m (837 ft)

Population (2024-12-31)
  - Total: 411
  - Density: 62.7/km^{2} (163/sq mi)
- Time zone: UTC+01:00 (CET)
  - Summer (DST): UTC+02:00 (CEST)
- Postal codes: 04626
- Dialling codes: 034495
- Vehicle registration: ABG

Dobitschen (German pronunciation: [ˈdoːbɪtʃn̩]) is a village and a former municipality in the Altenburger Land district, in the far eastern part of Thuringia, Germany. Since 1 January 2026, it is part of the town Schmölln. It was subdivided into the Ortsteile Dobitschen, Meucha, Pontewitz and Rolika, which are since 2026 Ortsteile of Schmölln.

== History ==
Within the German Empire (1871–1918), Dobitschen was part of the Duchy of Saxe-Altenburg. From 1952 to 1990, it was part of the Bezirk Leipzig of East Germany.

== Historical population ==
Population (31 December)
1994 - 664; 1995 - 660; 1996 - 644; 1997 - 641	1998 - 650; 1999 - 646; 2000 - 633; 2001 - 624	2002 - 599; 2003 - 589; 2011 - 505

== Persons ==
- Johann Friedrich Agricola
