= Göllnitz =

- Municipality
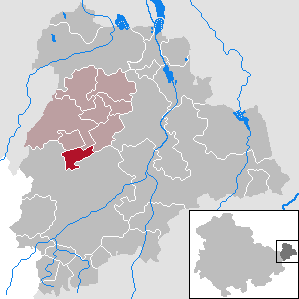
- Location of Göllnitz within Altenburger Land district
- Interactive map of Göllnitz
- Location within Germany Location within Thuringia
- Coordinates: 50°56′50″N 12°19′27″E
- Country: Germany
- State: Thuringia
- District: Altenburger Land
- Municipal assoc.: Rositz
- Subdivisions: 4

Government
  - Mayor (2022–28): Hans-Jürgen Heitsch

Area
  - Total: 5.08 km^{2} (1.96 sq mi)
- Elevation: 245 m (804 ft)

Population (2025-12-31)
  - Total: 300
  - Density: 59/km^{2} (150/sq mi)
- Time zone: UTC+01:00 (CET)
  - Summer (DST): UTC+02:00 (CEST)
- Postal codes: 04626
- Dialling codes: 034495
- Vehicle registration: ABG

Göllnitz (German pronunciation: [ˈɡœlnɪts]) is a municipality in the district Altenburger Land, in Thuringia, Germany.
