= Göhren, Thuringia =

Göhren
- Municipality
- Coat of arms

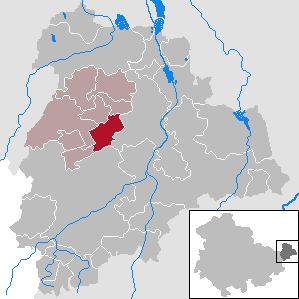
- Location of Göhren within Altenburger Land district
- Interactive map of Göhren
- Location within Germany Location within Thuringia
- Coordinates: 50°58′3″N 12°22′10″E
- Country: Germany
- State: Thuringia
- District: Altenburger Land
- Municipal assoc.: Rositz
- Subdivisions: 5

Government
  - Mayor (2022–28): Frank Eichhorn

Area
  - Total: 8.61 km^{2} (3.32 sq mi)
- Elevation: 225 m (738 ft)

Population (2025-12-31)
  - Total: 428
  - Density: 49.7/km^{2} (129/sq mi)
- Time zone: UTC+01:00 (CET)
  - Summer (DST): UTC+02:00 (CEST)
- Postal codes: 04603
- Dialling codes: 03447
- Vehicle registration: ABG

Göhren (German pronunciation: [ˈɡøːʁən]) is a municipality in the district of Altenburger Land, in Thuringia, Germany.
