= Saara, Altenburger Land =

Saara
- Ortsteil of Nobitz
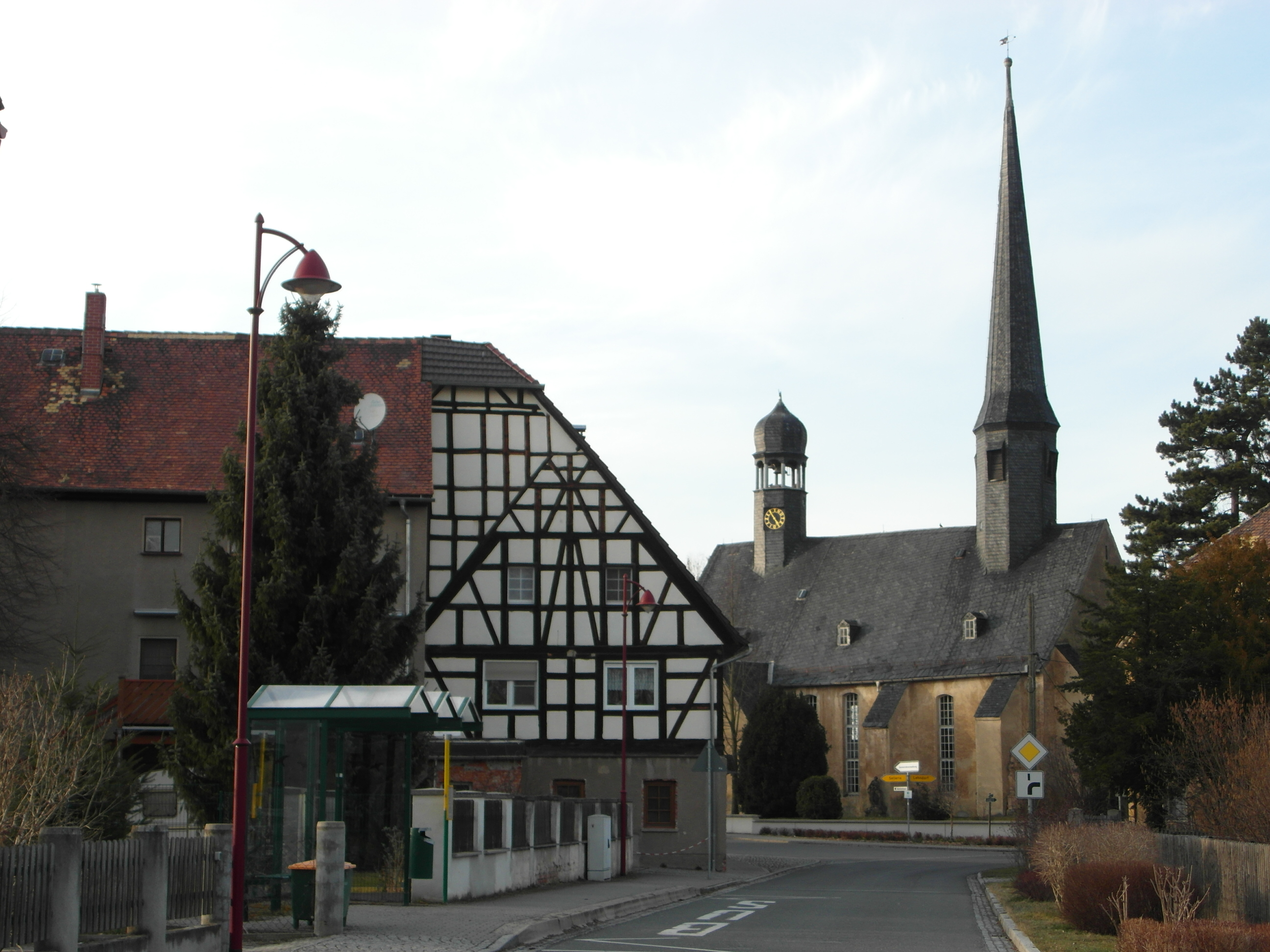
- Interactive map of Saara
- Location within Germany Location within Thuringia
- Coordinates: 50°56′1″N 12°25′19″E
- Country: Germany
- State: Thuringia
- District: Altenburger Land
- Municipality: Nobitz

Area
  - Total: 42.73 km^{2} (16.50 sq mi)
- Elevation: 189 m (620 ft)

Population (2011-12-31)
  - Total: 2,942
  - Density: 68.85/km^{2} (178.3/sq mi)
- Time zone: UTC+01:00 (CET)
  - Summer (DST): UTC+02:00 (CEST)
- Postal codes: 04603
- Dialling codes: 03447, 034493
- Vehicle registration: ABG

Saara is a village and a former municipality in the district of Altenburger Land, Thuringia, Germany.

== History ==
The municipality of Saara was established on January 1, 1996, through the consolidation of the former municipalities Lehndorf (containing the village Saara), Mockern, Podelwitz, Taupadel, and Zehma.

Since 31 December 2012, it is part of the municipality Nobitz.
