= Posterstein =

- Municipality
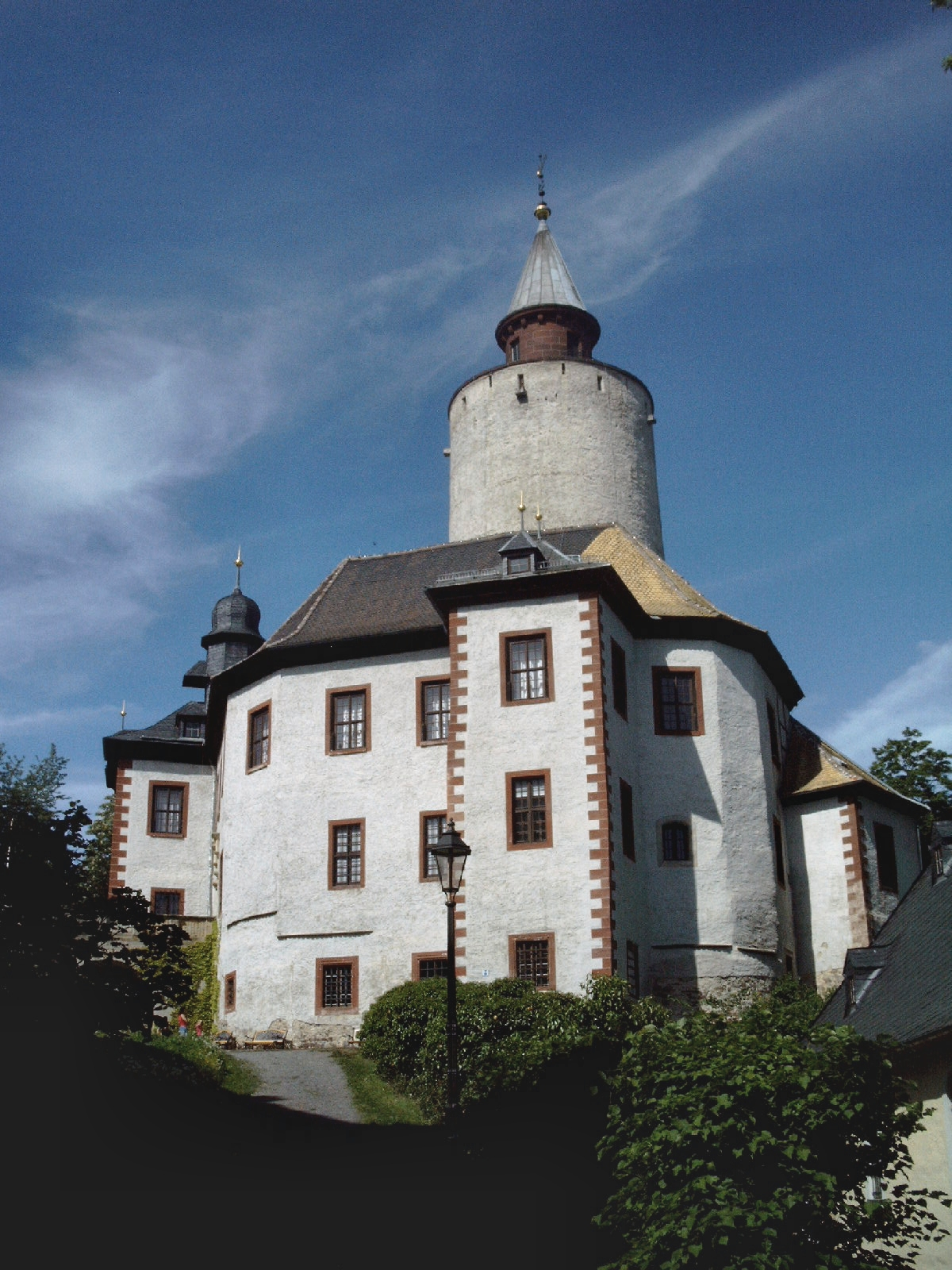

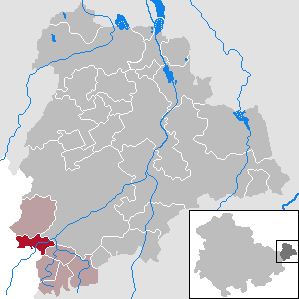
- Location of Posterstein within Altenburger Land district
- Interactive map of Posterstein
- Location within Germany Location within Thuringia
- Coordinates: 50°51′50″N 12°15′27″E
- Country: Germany
- State: Thuringia
- District: Altenburger Land
- Municipal assoc.: Oberes Sprottental
- Subdivisions: 2

Government
  - Mayor (2022–28): Stefan Jakubek

Area
  - Total: 5.53 km^{2} (2.14 sq mi)
- Elevation: 244–314 m (801–1,030 ft)

Population (2025-12-31)
  - Total: 441
  - Density: 79.7/km^{2} (207/sq mi)
- Time zone: UTC+01:00 (CET)
  - Summer (DST): UTC+02:00 (CEST)
- Postal codes: 04626
- Dialling codes: 034496
- Vehicle registration: ABG
- Website: www.posterstein.de

Posterstein is a German municipality in the Thuringian Landkreis of Altenburger Land.

== Geography ==
=== Neighboring municipalities ===
Municipalities near Posterstein are Heukewalde, Löbichau, Nöbdenitz, and Vollmershain in the district of Altenburger Land; as well as Paitzdorf and the city of Ronneburg in the district of Greiz.

=== Municipal arrangement ===
Stolzenberg is Posterstein's only subdivision.

== History ==
Within the German Empire (1871–1918), Posterstein was part of the Duchy of Saxe-Altenburg.

== Culture and landmarks ==
The Postersteiner Burg, which is lit up at night, is the most important building in the town. It is also visible north of the community from the Bundesautobahn 4.

== Business and transportation ==
The next train station on the rail line from Posterstein is in Nöbdenitz.
