= Altenburger Land =

Coordinates: 51°0′N 12°25′E

- District
- Flag Coat of arms
- Country: Germany
- State: Thuringia
- Capital: Altenburg

Government
  - District admin.: Uwe Melzer (CDU)

Area
  - Total: 569.41 km^{2} (219.85 sq mi)

Population (31 December 2025)
  - Total: 87,508
  - Density: 153.68/km^{2} (398.03/sq mi)
- Time zone: UTC+01:00 (CET)
  - Summer (DST): UTC+02:00 (CEST)
- Vehicle registration: ABG, SLN
- Website: altenburgerland.de

Altenburger Land is a district in Thuringia, Germany. It is bounded by (from the west and clockwise) the district of Greiz, the Burgenlandkreis (Saxony-Anhalt), and the districts Leipzig, Mittelsachsen and Zwickau in Saxony. The district is a member of the Central German Metropolitan Region.

== Geography ==
Altenburger Land is the easternmost district of Thuringia. It is largely agricultural with three quarters of the total area being used for agriculture. In contrast, forests make up only around 10% of the area, especially in the south of the district there are only few forests. This can be explained by a high soil fertility with a Loess-layer of up to 3.5 meters.

The main river is the Pleiße, a tributary of the White Elster, crossing the district from south to north. The hilly Osterland constituting the northernmost foothills of the Ore Mountains slopes gently away to the plains of eastern Saxony-Anhalt.

== History ==
The region on the Pleiße River was part of a huge forest, where the Thuringii formed the Thuringian Kingdom. After this, the Kingdom was in 531 taken over by the Franks, Slavic people were also moving in. Thuringians reestablished independent rule. The castle of Altenburg already existed in the 10th century, it became an imperial seat. In the following centuries German settlers from other parts moved in. It was part of the Margravate of Meissen in the 14th century. At this time most of the forests were cleared.

The town of Altenburg and the surrounding lands were the tiny Duchy of Saxe-Altenburg from 1826 to 1918; afterwards it was a state within the Weimar Republic for a short time, before it was dissolved in 1922 in order to join the Free State of Thuringia.

The district in its present borders was established in 1922 under the name "Altenburg". In 1952 there was an administrative reform splitting the districts into two smaller units, called "Altenburg" and "Schmölln". They were merged again in 1994 under the name Altenburger Land.

=== Historical Population ===
Year	Population
1994	121,559
1995	120,655
1996	119,359
1997	118,487
1998	117,143
1999	115,689
2000	114,200
2001	112,421

Year	Population
2002	110,887
2003	109,304
2004	107,893
2005	106,365
2006	104,721
2007	103,313
2008	101,705
2009	100,215

Year	Population
2010	98,810
2011	97,443
2012	94,749
2013	93,605
2014	92,705
2015	92,344
2016	91,607
2017	90,650

Year	Population
2018	90,118
2019	89,393
2020	88,356
2021	87,807
2022	88,787
2023	88,692

Source: from 1994 Thüringer Landesamt für Statistik – values from 31 December

== Politics ==
=== District Council ===
The 46 seats in the district council are distributed between the parties as follows since the Regional Elections in Thüringia 26 May 2024:

Parties	Seats	Total 46 seats: Left: 5; Greens: 1; SPD: 5; Freie Wähler: 3; Free Democratic Party (Germany): 1; Christian Democratic Union of Germany: 13; Heimat: 4; AfD: 14
AfD	14 (+4)	Total 46 seats: Left: 5; Greens: 1; SPD: 5; Freie Wähler: 3; Free Democratic Party (Germany): 1; Christian Democratic Union of Germany: 13; Heimat: 4; AfD: 14
CDU	13 (±0)	Total 46 seats: Left: 5; Greens: 1; SPD: 5; Freie Wähler: 3; Free Democratic Party (Germany): 1; Christian Democratic Union of Germany: 13; Heimat: 4; AfD: 14
SPD	5 (−2)	Total 46 seats: Left: 5; Greens: 1; SPD: 5; Freie Wähler: 3; Free Democratic Party (Germany): 1; Christian Democratic Union of Germany: 13; Heimat: 4; AfD: 14
Die Linke	5 (−2)	Total 46 seats: Left: 5; Greens: 1; SPD: 5; Freie Wähler: 3; Free Democratic Party (Germany): 1; Christian Democratic Union of Germany: 13; Heimat: 4; AfD: 14
Starke Heimat	4 (+4)	Total 46 seats: Left: 5; Greens: 1; SPD: 5; Freie Wähler: 3; Free Democratic Party (Germany): 1; Christian Democratic Union of Germany: 13; Heimat: 4; AfD: 14
Bundesverband Freie Wähler	3 (−2)	Total 46 seats: Left: 5; Greens: 1; SPD: 5; Freie Wähler: 3; Free Democratic Party (Germany): 1; Christian Democratic Union of Germany: 13; Heimat: 4; AfD: 14
FDP	1 (−1)	Total 46 seats: Left: 5; Greens: 1; SPD: 5; Freie Wähler: 3; Free Democratic Party (Germany): 1; Christian Democratic Union of Germany: 13; Heimat: 4; AfD: 14
Grüne	1 (−1)	

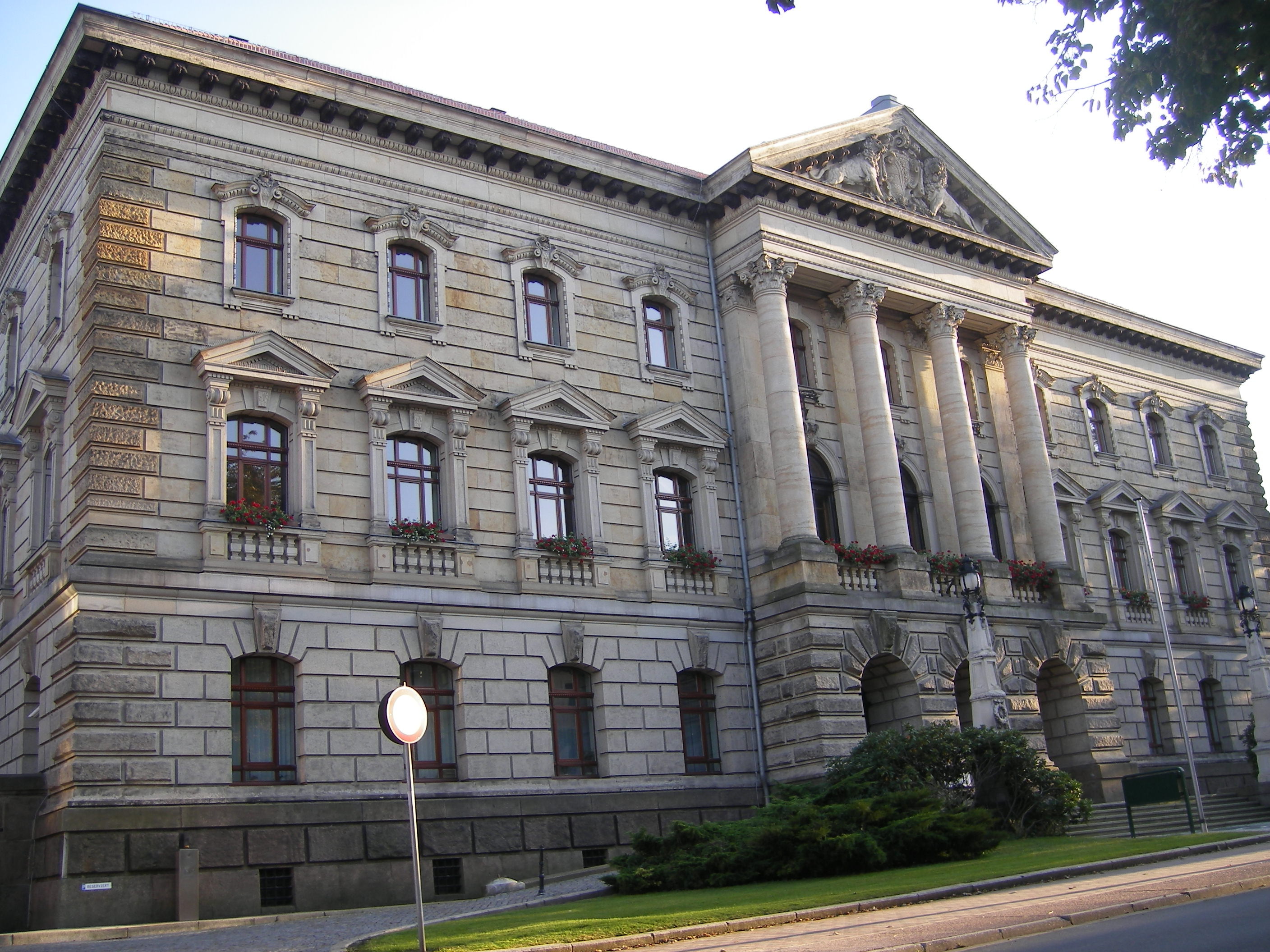
Landratsamt Altenburger Land in der Lindenaustraße in Altenburg

== Coat of arms ==
District banner of Altenburger Land

The coat of arms displays:

- The red rose stands for the Burgraviate of Altenburg and is also part of the coat of arms of the city of Altenburg
- The lion, which was the symbol of the reeves of Plauen; they had great power in the region during the 14th and 15th centuries
- The black and gold stripes with the green ring was the coat of arms of the Saxon Wettin dynasty
- The red acorn symbolises the skat game, which was invented in Altenburg in 1813

=== Partnerschaften ===
- Enzkreis (since 1991)
- Hickory, North Carolina, (USA, since 1997)

== Towns and municipalities ==
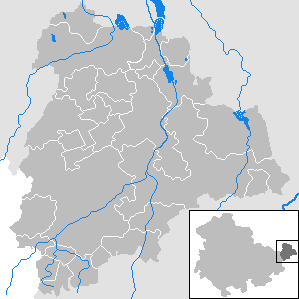
Clickable map of towns and municipalities in the district

Verwaltungsgemeinschaft-free towns
1. Altenburg
2. Gößnitz
3. Lucka
4. Meuselwitz
5. Schmölln
and municipalities
1. Göpfersdorf
2. Heyersdorf
3. Langenleuba-Niederhain
4. Nobitz
5. Ponitz

Verwaltungsgemeinschaften
1. Oberes Sprottental; 1. Heukewalde; 2. Jonaswalde; 3. Löbichau; 4. Posterstein^{1}; 5. Thonhausen; 6. Vollmershain	2. Pleißenaue; 1. Fockendorf; 2. Gerstenberg; 3. Haselbach; 4. Treben^{1}; 5. Windischleuba	3. Rositz; 1. Göhren; 2. Göllnitz; 3. Kriebitzsch; 4. Lödla; 5. Mehna; 6. Monstab; 7. Rositz^{1}; 8. Starkenberg
^{1}seat of the Verwaltungsgemeinschaft
